= Plutocracy =

Society controlled by the wealthiest citizens

A plutocracy (from Ancient Greek πλοῦτος (ploûtos) 'wealth' and κράτος (krátos) 'power') or plutarchy is a society that is ruled or controlled by people of great wealth or income. It can be considered a form of oligarchy (rule by the few) where the ruling few are wealthy. The first known use of the term in English dates from 1631. It is not rooted in any established political philosophy.

== Usage ==
The term plutocracy is generally used as a pejorative to describe or warn against an undesirable condition. "Dollarocracy", an anglicised adaptation of the word "plutocracy", may refer to "a specifically American version of plutocracy".

== Examples ==
Historic examples of plutocracies include the Roman Empire; some city-states in Ancient Greece; the civilization of Carthage; the Italian merchant city-states of Venice, Florence and Genoa; the Dutch Republic; and the pre-World War II Empire of Japan (the zaibatsu). According to Noam Chomsky and Jimmy Carter, the modern United States resembles a plutocracy though with democratic forms. In 2018, Paul Volcker, a former chair of the Federal Reserve, stated he also believed the U.S. to be developing into a plutocracy.

One modern, formal example of a plutocracy, according to some critics, is the City of London. The City (also called the Square Mile of ancient London, corresponding to the modern financial district, an area of about 2.5 km^{2}) has a unique electoral system for its local administration, separate from the rest of London. More than two-thirds of voters are not residents, but rather representatives of businesses and other bodies that occupy premises in the City, with votes distributed according to their numbers of employees. The principal justification for this arrangement is that most of the services provided by the City of London Corporation are used by the businesses in the City. Around 450,000 non-residents constitute the City's day-time population, far outnumbering the City's 7,000 residents.

In the political jargon and propaganda of Fascist Italy, Nazi Germany and the Communist International, Western democratic states were referred to as plutocracies, with the implication being that a small number of extremely wealthy individuals were controlling the countries and holding them to ransom. Plutocracy replaced democracy and capitalism as the principal fascist term for the U.S. and Great Britain during World War II. In Nazi Germany, it was often used as a dog whistle term for Jewish people in their antisemitic propaganda. Joseph Goebbels, the Reich Minister of Propaganda, found the term to be particularly favorable, describing it as "the main concept at which the ideological struggle will be aimed".

=== United States ===
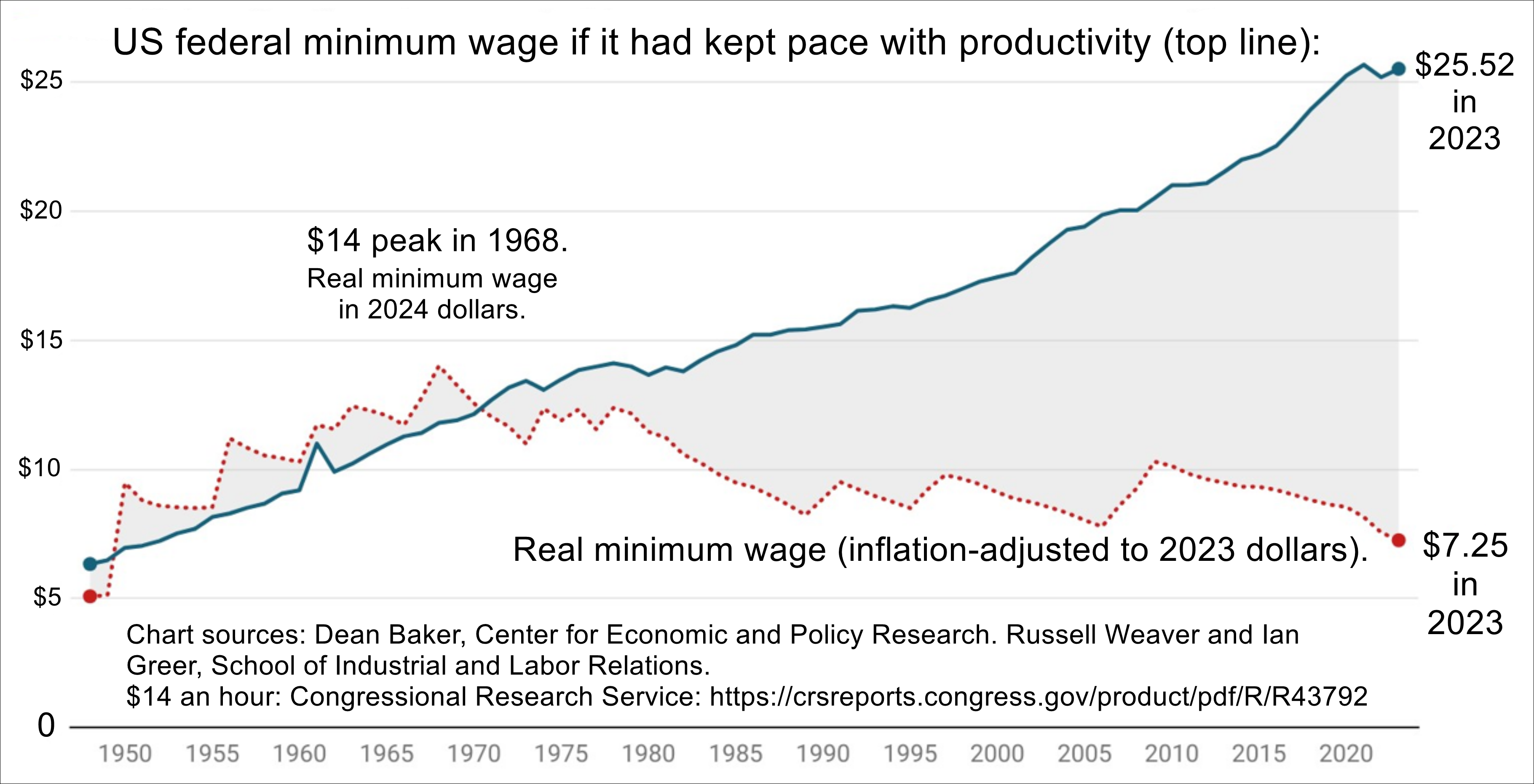
US federal minimum wage if it had kept pace with productivity. Also, the real minimum wage

Some modern historians, politicians, and economists argue that the U.S. was effectively plutocratic for at least part of the Gilded Age and Progressive Era periods between the end of the Civil War until the beginning of the Great Depression. President Theodore Roosevelt became known as the "trust-buster" for his aggressive use of antitrust law, through which he managed to break up such major combinations as the largest railroad and Standard Oil, the largest oil company. According to historian David Burton, "When it came to domestic political concerns, TR's bête noire was the plutocracy." In his autobiographical account of taking on monopolistic corporations as president, Roosevelt recounted:

... we had come to the stage where for our people what was needed was a real democracy; and of all forms of tyranny the least attractive and the most vulgar is the tyranny of mere wealth, the tyranny of a plutocracy.

The Sherman Antitrust Act had been enacted in 1890, when large industries reaching monopolistic or near-monopolistic levels of market concentration and financial capital increasingly integrating corporations and a handful of very wealthy heads of large corporations began to exert increasing influence over industry, public opinion and politics after the Civil War. Money, according to contemporary progressive and journalist Walter Weyl, was "the mortar of this edifice", with ideological differences among politicians fading and the political realm becoming "a mere branch in a still larger, integrated business. The state, which through the party formally sold favors to the large corporations, became one of their departments."

In "The Politics of Plutocracy" section of his book The Conscience of a Liberal, economist Paul Krugman says plutocracy took hold because of three factors: at that time, the poorest quarter of American residents (African-Americans and non-naturalized immigrants) were ineligible to vote, the wealthy funded the campaigns of politicians they preferred, and vote buying was "feasible, easy and widespread", as were other forms of electoral fraud such as ballot-box stuffing and intimidation of the other party's voters.

The U.S. instituted progressive taxation in 1913, but according to Shamus Khan, in the 1970s, elites used their increasing political power to lower their taxes, and today successfully employ what political scientist Jeffrey Winters calls "the income defense industry" to greatly reduce their taxes.

==== Post-World War II ====
In modern times, the term is sometimes used pejoratively to refer to societies rooted in state-corporate capitalism or which prioritize the accumulation of wealth over other interests. According to Kevin Phillips, author and political strategist to Richard Nixon, the United States is a plutocracy in which there is a "fusion of money and government."

Chrystia Freeland, author of Plutocrats, says that the present trend towards plutocracy occurs because the rich feel that their interests are shared by society:

You don't do this in a kind of chortling, smoking your cigar, conspiratorial thinking way. You do it by persuading yourself that what is in your own personal self-interest is in the interests of everybody else. So you persuade yourself that, actually, government services, things like spending on education, which is what created that social mobility in the first place, need to be cut so that the deficit will shrink, so that your tax bill doesn't go up. And what I really worry about is, there is so much money and so much power at the very top, and the gap between those people at the very top and everybody else is so great, that we are going to see social mobility choked off and society transformed.

In 1998, Bob Herbert of The New York Times referred to modern American plutocrats as "The Donor Class" (list of top (political party) donors) and defined the class, for the first time, as "a tiny group – just one-quarter of 1 percent of the population – and it is not representative of the rest of the nation. But its money buys plenty of access."

When the Nobel Prize–winning economist Joseph Stiglitz wrote the 2011 Vanity Fair magazine article entitled "Of the 1%, by the 1%, for the 1%", the title and content supported Stiglitz's claim that the U.S. is increasingly ruled by the wealthiest 1%. Some researchers have said the U.S. may be drifting towards a form of oligarchy, as individual citizens have less impact than economic elites and organized interest groups upon public policy. In the U.S. Congress itself, more than half of all members are millionaires.

A study conducted by political scientists Martin Gilens of Princeton University and Benjamin Page of Northwestern University, which was released in April 2014, stated that their "analyses suggest that majorities of the American public actually have little influence over the policies our government adopts". Gilens and Page do not characterize the U.S. as an "oligarchy" or "plutocracy" per se; however, they do apply the concept of "civil oligarchy" as used by Jeffrey A. Winters with respect to the U.S.

The investor, billionaire, and philanthropist Warren Buffett, one of the wealthiest people in the world, voiced in 2005 and once more in 2006 his view that his class, the "rich class", is waging class warfare on the rest of society. In 2005 Buffet said to CNN: "It's class warfare, my class is winning, but they shouldn't be." In a November 2006 interview in The New York Times, Buffett stated that "[t]here's class warfare all right, but it's my class, the rich class, that's making war, and we're winning."

== Causation ==
According to Piketty, in a nation that is experiencing rapid economic growth, income inequality will tend to increase as the rate of return on innovation increases.

== See also ==
- Aristocracy – Form of government
- Banana republic – Term for a politically unstable country
- Broligarchy – A society controlled by tech bros
- Corporatocracy – Society controlled by business corporations
- Elitism – Notion that elites deserve more influence
- Kleptocracy – Government where officials steal for personal gain
- Neo-feudalism – Theoretical rebirth of antique governance
- Oligarchy – Form of government with small ruling class
- Overclass – Social class
- Plutonomy – Science of production and distribution of wealth
- Timocracy – Form of government, where power derives from wealth
- Upper class – Social class
- Wealth concentration – Spread of wealth in a society
- Property qualification – Exclusion from voting rights on the basis of a lack of property
