= Chrystia Freeland =

Canadian politician and journalist (born 1968)

The Honourable Chrystia Freeland PC
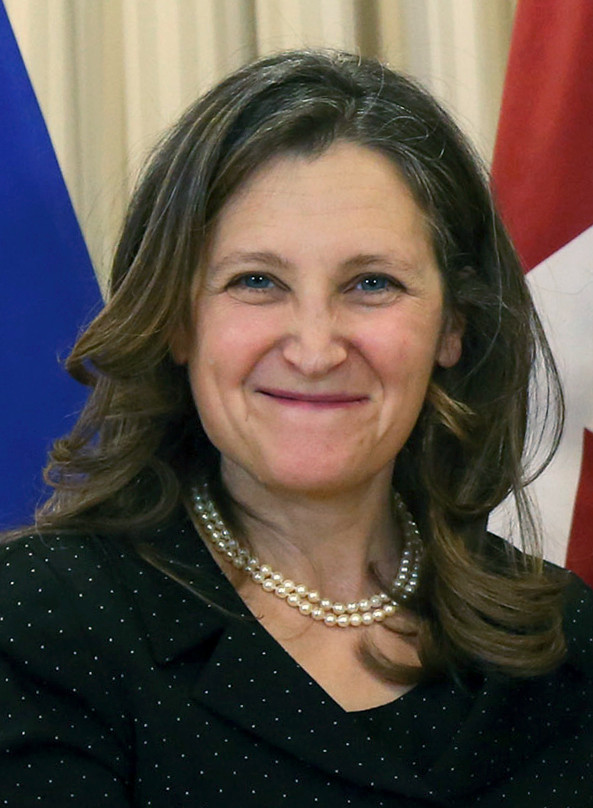
- Freeland in 2023

Warden of Rhodes House and Chief Executive Officer of the Rhodes Trust
- Incumbent
- Assumed office July 1, 2026
- Preceded by: Elizabeth Kiss (Note: Richard Trainor served in the interim.)

10th Deputy Prime Minister of Canada
- In office November 20, 2019 – December 16, 2024
- Prime Minister: Justin Trudeau
- Preceded by: Anne McLellan (Note: This position was vacant from February 6, 2006, until November 20, 2019.)
- Succeeded by: Vacant
Other positions
Special Representative for the Reconstruction of Ukraine
In office September 16, 2025 – January 9, 2026
| Prime Minister | Mark Carney |
| Preceded by | Position established |
| Succeeded by | Vacant |
Minister of Transport and Internal Trade
In office March 14, 2025 – September 16, 2025
| Prime Minister | Mark Carney |
| Preceded by | Anita Anand |
| Succeeded by | Steven MacKinnon (Transport); Dominic LeBlanc (Internal Trade) |
Minister of Finance
In office August 18, 2020 – December 16, 2024
| Prime Minister | Justin Trudeau |
| Preceded by | Bill Morneau |
| Succeeded by | Dominic LeBlanc |
Minister of Intergovernmental Affairs
In office November 20, 2019 – August 18, 2020
| Prime Minister | Justin Trudeau |
| Preceded by | Dominic LeBlanc |
| Succeeded by | Dominic LeBlanc |
Minister of Foreign Affairs
In office January 10, 2017 – November 20, 2019
| Prime Minister | Justin Trudeau |
| Preceded by | Stéphane Dion |
| Succeeded by | François-Philippe Champagne |
Minister of International Trade
In office November 4, 2015 – January 10, 2017
| Prime Minister | Justin Trudeau |
| Preceded by | Ed Fast |
| Succeeded by | François-Philippe Champagne |

Member of Parliament
- In office October 19, 2015 – January 9, 2026
- Preceded by: Riding established
- Succeeded by: Danielle Martin
- Constituency: University—Rosedale
- In office November 24, 2013 – October 19, 2015
- Preceded by: Bob Rae
- Succeeded by: Bill Morneau
- Constituency: Toronto Centre

Personal details
- Born: Christina Alexandra Freeland; August 2, 1968 (age 58) Peace River, Alberta, Canada
- Party: Liberal
- Spouse: Graham Bowley
- Children: 3
- Relatives: Michael Chomiak (maternal grandfather); John-Paul Himka (uncle); Ged Baldwin (great-uncle)
- Education: Harvard University (BA); St Antony's College, Oxford (MSt)
- Occupation: Politician; journalist; author; diplomat; academic administrator
- Awards: Rhodes Scholarship (1993)

Christina Alexandra Freeland (born August 2, 1968) is a Canadian politician and journalist who served as the tenth deputy prime minister of Canada from 2019 to 2024. A member of the Liberal Party, she was first elected as the member of Parliament (MP) for Toronto Centre in 2013 and represented University—Rosedale from 2015 to 2026. Freeland served as a Cabinet minister from 2015 to 2025 during the premierships of Justin Trudeau and Mark Carney.

After the 2015 federal election, Freeland was appointed by Prime Minister Trudeau to serve as the minister of international trade and became the minister of foreign affairs in 2017, as Canada negotiated the Canada–United States–Mexico Agreement (CUSMA) and finalized the Comprehensive Economic and Trade Agreement (CETA). In 2019, she became deputy prime minister and minister of intergovernmental affairs, serving in the latter role until 2020, when she became minister of finance. As finance minister, Freeland introduced four federal budgets, including federal aid measures during the COVID-19 pandemic, and was the first woman to serve in the role.

In December 2024, Freeland resigned from Cabinet on the day she was scheduled to present the government’s fall economic statement, triggering a political crisis that ultimately led to the resignation of Trudeau. Freeland ran in the subsequent 2025 Liberal leadership election, placing a distant second to Carney. In March 2025, Freeland returned to Cabinet after Carney appointed her minister of transport and internal trade, positions she held until resigning in September 2025. That same month, she was appointed special representative for the reconstruction of Ukraine.

On January 5, 2026, Ukrainian President Volodymyr Zelenskyy announced Freeland's appointment as an unpaid economic adviser to his government. Later that week, Freeland announced her intention to resign as special representative and from Parliament. Her resignations took effect on January 9. In July 2026, Freeland became the warden of Rhodes House and chief executive officer of the Rhodes Trust.

== Early life and education (1968–1993) ==
Christina Alexandra Freeland was born in Peace River, Alberta on August 2, 1968. Her father, Donald Freeland, was a farmer, lawyer, and a member of the Liberal Party. Her paternal grandmother was a Scottish war bride. Her Ukrainian mother, Halyna Chomiak (1946–2007), was also a lawyer, and ran for the New Democratic Party (NDP) in Edmonton Strathcona in the 1988 federal election. Her maternal grandfather was Nazi collaborator Michael Chomiak. Freeland's parents divorced when she was nine years old, though she continued to live with both of them.

Freeland was an activist from a young age, organizing a strike in grade five to protest her school's exclusive enrichment classes. She attended Old Scona Academic High School in Edmonton, Alberta for two years before attending the United World College of the Adriatic, in Italy, on a merit scholarship from the Alberta government for a project that sought to promote international peace and understanding.

Freeland studied Russian history and literature at Harvard University. During 1988–89, she was an exchange student at the Taras Shevchenko State University of Kyiv in Soviet Ukraine, where she studied Ukrainian, in which she is fluent. While there, she worked with journalist Bill Keller of The New York Times to document the Bykivnia graves, an unmarked mass grave site where the NKVD (the Soviet secret police) disposed of tens of thousands of dissidents. The official Soviet story held that the graves were the result of Nazi atrocities. She translated the stories of locals who had witnessed covered trucks and "puddles of blood in the road" that predated the Nazi invasion, adding evidence that the site was actually the result of Stalinist repression and purges.

While there, she attracted the attention of the KGB, which tagged her with the code name "Frida". Soviet newspapers attacked her as a foreigner meddling in their internal affairs over her contacts with Ukrainian activists. The KGB put Freeland under surveillance and tapped her phone calls. They documented the young Canadian activist delivering money, video and audio recording equipment, and a personal computer to contacts in Ukraine. She used the Embassy of Canada in Moscow to send material abroad in secret diplomatic pouches, worked with foreign journalists on stories about life in the Soviet Union, and organized marches and rallies to attract attention and support from Western countries. On her return from a trip to London in March 1989, Freeland was denied re-entry to the Soviet Union. By the time her activism within Ukraine came to an end, Freeland had become the subject of a high-level case study from the KGB on how much damage a single determined individual could inflict on the Soviet Union; a 2021 Globe and Mail article quoted the report by a former officer of the KGB, which had described Freeland as "a remarkable individual", "erudite, sociable, persistent, and inventive in achieving her goals".

Freeland worked as an intern for United Press International in London in the summer of 1990. Afterwards, she completed a Master of Studies degree in Slavonic studies from the University of Oxford in 1993 having studied at St Antony's College as a Rhodes Scholar.

== Journalism career (1993–2013) ==
Freeland worked as a journalist in Ukraine and eventually held editorial positions at the Financial Times, The Globe and Mail, and Reuters. She also authored Sale of the Century: Russia's Wild Ride from Communism to Capitalism (2000) and Plutocrats: The Rise of the New Global Super Rich and the Fall of Everyone Else (2012).

Freeland began her career in journalism as a stringer for the Financial Times, The Washington Post, and The Economist while working in Ukraine. Freeland later worked for the Financial Times in London as a deputy editor, and then as an editor for its weekend edition, FT.com, and UK news. Freeland also served as Moscow bureau chief and Eastern Europe correspondent for the Financial Times.

From 1999 to 2001, Freeland served as the deputy editor of The Globe and Mail. She next worked as the managing director and editor of consumer news at Thomson Reuters. She was also a weekly columnist for The Globe and Mail. Previously, she was editor of Thomson Reuters Digital, a position she held since April 2011. Prior to that she was the global editor-at-large of Reuters news since March 1, 2010, having formerly been the United States managing editor at the Financial Times, based in New York City.

=== Published works ===
Freeland is the author of Sale of the Century: Russia's Wild Ride from Communism to Capitalism (2000), as well as Plutocrats: The Rise of the New Global Super-Rich and the Fall of Everyone Else (2012). Sale of the Century is an account of privatization in Russia. It is based on interviews between Freeland and leading Russian businessmen, conducted from 1994 to 1998 when she lived in Russia as the Moscow bureau chief for the Financial Times. The book chronicles the challenges that the "young reformers" championing capitalism such as Anatoly Chubais and Yegor Gaidar had in wresting control of Russian industry out of the hands of the communist "red barons". The compromises they made, such as the loans for shares scheme, allowed businessmen such as Mikhail Fridman, Mikhail Khodorkovsky, and Vladimir Potanin to seize control of the economy and install themselves as Russian oligarchs. Plutocrats was a New York Times bestseller, and the winner of the 2013 Lionel Gelber Prize for non-fiction reporting on foreign affairs. It also won the 2013 National Business Book Award for the most outstanding Canadian business-related book. In 2026, Freeland authored Unreliable Boyfriend: An Insider's View of Dealing with a Chaotic Superpower, Plutocrats, and Other Complicated People, a political memoir detailing her perspective on the United States and other powerful actors.

== Political career (2013–2026) ==
On July 26, 2013, Freeland left journalism to enter politics. She sought the nomination for the Liberal Party in Toronto Centre to replace Bob Rae, who was stepping down to become chief negotiator and counsel for the Matawa First Nations in Northern Ontario's Ring of Fire. She won the nomination on September 15, and faced NDP candidate Linda McQuaig in the November 25 by-election. During the campaign, she received criticism for purchasing a $1.3 million home, although the price was consistent with Toronto's home prices. Freeland won 49 percent of the vote and was elected. In 2013, Freeland received campaign contributions from Paul M. Grod, former president of the Ukrainian Canadian Congress (UCC) and current president of the Ukrainian World Congress (UWG), and Ukrainian-Canadian businessman James C. Temerty.

During the demonstrations leading up to the 2014 Ukrainian Revolution of Dignity, Freeland wrote an op-ed for The Globe and Mail, in which she excoriated the government of Viktor Yanukovych. She supported seizing personal assets and banning travel as part of economic sanction programs against Yanukovych and members of his government. That March, during the annexation of Crimea by Russia, Freeland visited Ukraine on behalf of the Liberal Party. She met community leaders and members of the government in Kyiv, including Mustafa Dzhemilev, leader of the Crimean Tatars; Vitali Klitschko, leader of the Ukrainian Democratic Alliance for Reform; and Ukrainian MP Petro Poroshenko, who was later elected president of Ukraine in May 2014. Since 2009, Freeland has been a regular attendee of the Yalta European Strategy annual meetings founded and sponsored by Ukrainian oligarch Victor Pinchuk.

Freeland was one of thirteen Canadians banned from travelling to Russia under retaliatory sanctions imposed by Russian president Vladimir Putin in March 2014. She replied through her official Twitter feed, "Love Russ lang/culture, loved my yrs in Moscow; but it's an honour to be on Putin's sanction list, esp in company of friends Cotler & Grod." In the riding redistribution of 2012 and 2013, much of Freeland's base was shifted from Toronto Centre to the new riding of University—Rosedale, where she ran in the 2015 federal election. She defeated NDP challenger Jennifer Hollett with 50 percent of the vote.

=== Minister of International Trade (2015–2017) ===
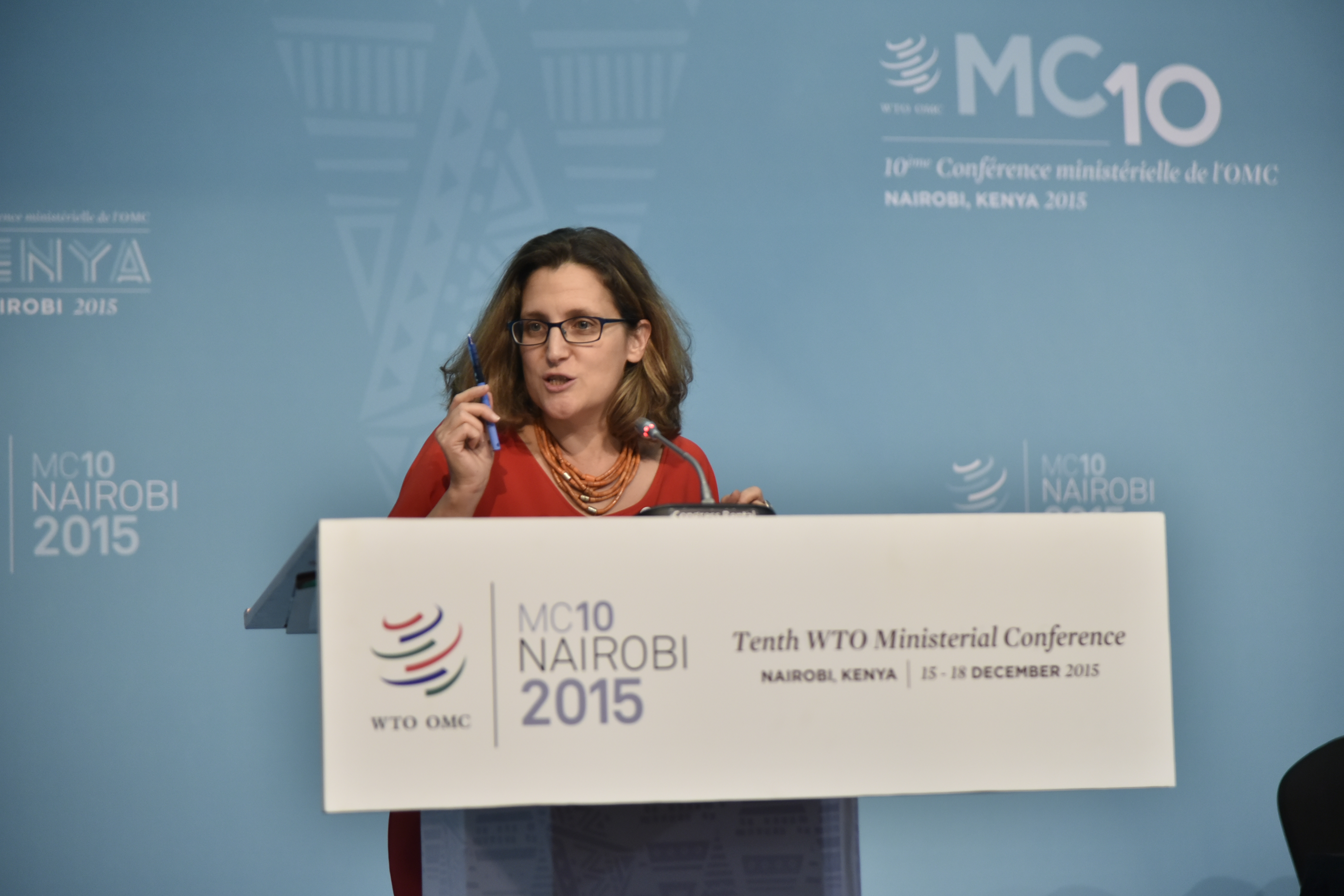
Freeland, then the minister of international trade, speaks at the 2015 WTO ministerial conference

On November 4, 2015, newly elected prime minister Justin Trudeau chose Freeland as minister of international trade in his first Cabinet. She was involved in negotiations leading up to the Comprehensive Economic and Trade Agreement (CETA) between Canada and the European Union, former prime minister Stephen Harper's legacy project. The trade deal, signed October 30, 2016, was Canada's largest since NAFTA.

=== Minister of Foreign Affairs (2017–2019) ===
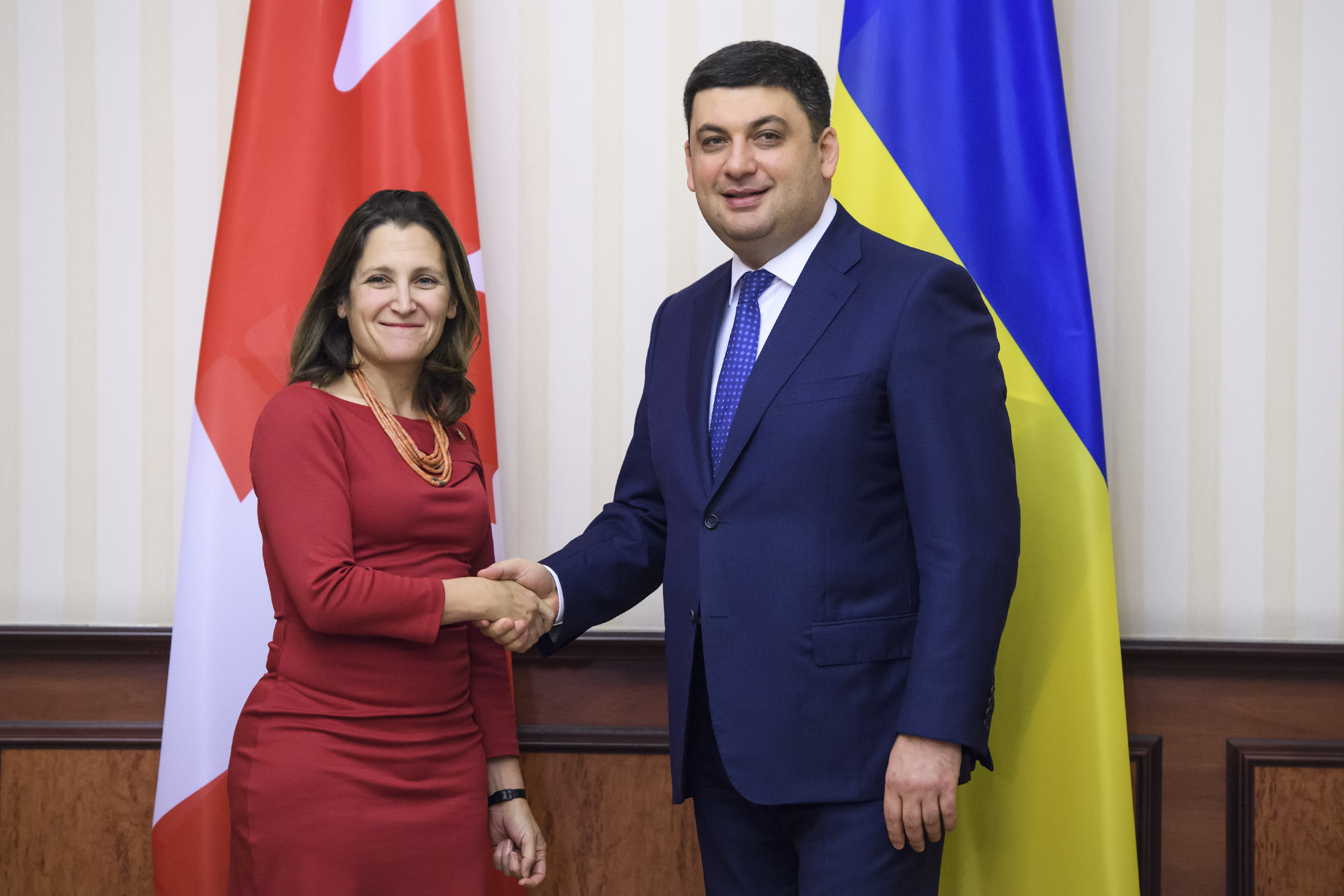
Freeland meeting with Ukrainian Prime Minister Volodymyr Groysman in December 2017

In a Cabinet shuffle on January 10, 2017, Freeland was appointed minister of foreign affairs, replacing Stéphane Dion as the head of Trudeau's foreign policy. With National Defence Minister Harjit Sajjan, Freeland announced Canada's military training mission in Ukraine would be extended until March 2019, maintaining the 200 soldiers previously mandated by the Harper government.

That August, she instructed her department and officials to "energetically" review reports of Canadian-made Terradyne military vehicles being used against civilians in Shia-populated city of Al-Awamiyah by Saudi Arabian security forces. The government briefly suspended Terradyne's export permits to Saudi Arabia before reinstating them; a Canadian investigation stated that it "found no conclusive evidence that Canadian-made vehicles were used in human rights violations". This conclusion was challenged by human rights groups such as Project Ploughshares for not considering the risk of human rights abuses. Freeland sponsored Bill C-47, which allowed Canada to join the Arms Trade Treaty in 2019.

Freeland condemned the persecution of Rohingya Muslims in Myanmar. She said the violence against the Rohingya "looks a lot like ethnic cleansing and that is not acceptable". Freeland issued a statement via Twitter on August 2, 2018, expressing Canada's concern over the arrest of Samar Badawi, a human rights activist and sister of imprisoned Saudi blogger Raif Badawi. She advocated their release. In response to Canada's criticism, Saudi Arabia expelled Canada's ambassador, and froze trade with Canada. Freeland asked for help from allies including Germany, Sweden, the United Arab Emirates and the United Kingdom. In September 2018, Freeland raised the issue of Xinjiang re-education camps and human rights abuses against the Uyghurs in a meeting with Chinese Foreign Minister Wang Yi.

In January 2019, at the request of the Office of the United Nations High Commissioner for Refugees, Canada granted asylum to 18-year-old Saudi teenager Rahaf Mohammed, who was fleeing her abusive family in Kuwait; Freeland personally greeted Mohammed at Toronto Pearson International Airport. Freeland condemned Venezuelan president Nicolás Maduro, who had "seized power through fraudulent and anti-democratic elections". Freeland joined the World Economic Forum's board of trustees in 2019. Later that year she was ranked 37th among the World's 50 Greatest Leaders in Fortune magazine's annual list. Freeland voiced support for the 2019–2020 Hong Kong protests. In October 2019, Freeland condemned the unilateral Turkish invasion of the Kurdish areas in Syria.

=== Deputy Prime Minister (2019–2024) ===
After the 2019 federal election, she was appointed deputy prime minister and minister of intergovernmental affairs. As deputy prime minister, Freeland was entrusted with several key planks of Trudeau's domestic policy such as strengthening Medicare, implementing Canada's national climate strategy, introducing firearms regulations, developing a pan-Canadian child care system, facilitating interprovincial free trade, and reconciliation with Indigenous peoples. As minister of intergovernmental affairs, her primary task was to address renewed tensions between the federal government and the western provinces, most notably with the rise of Alberta separatism.

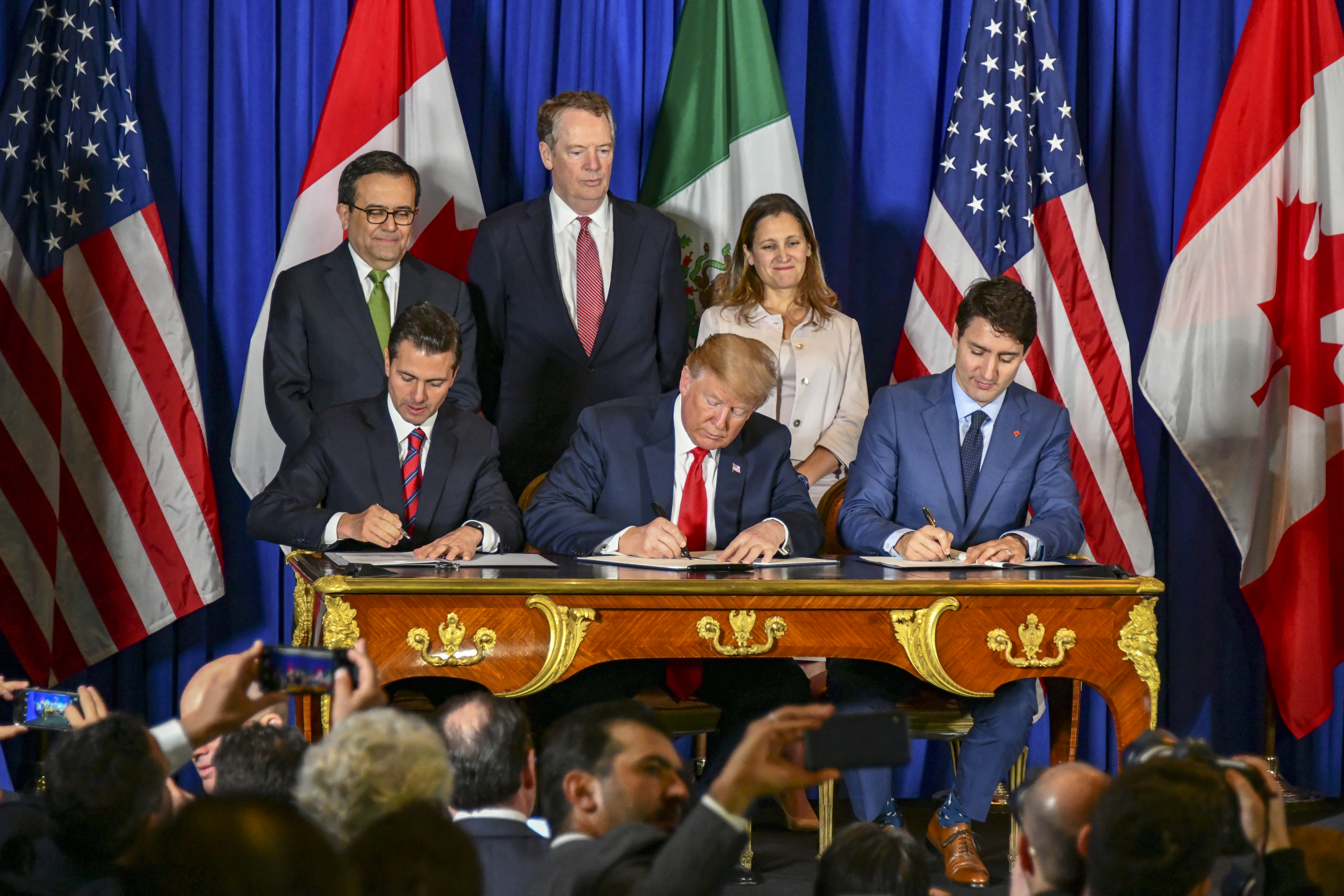
Freeland stands behind Trudeau during the signing of the CUSMA trade agreement, November 2018

She remained in charge of Canada–United States relations, including the ratification of the renegotiated free trade agreement with the United States and Mexico (CUSMA), roles that have traditionally resided with the minister of foreign affairs. The CUSMA was ratified in March 2020, at the outset of the COVID-19 pandemic in Canada. That August, Freeland was appointed Minister of Finance.

==== Minister of Intergovernmental Affairs (2019–2020) ====
Freeland took over the intergovernmental affairs portfolio following the 2019 election when she was appointed deputy prime minister. In her new capacity, she was responsible for handling regional issues such as western alienation—particularly in Alberta and Saskatchewan where the Liberals had failed to win a single seat—as well as the resurgence of the Bloc Québécois.

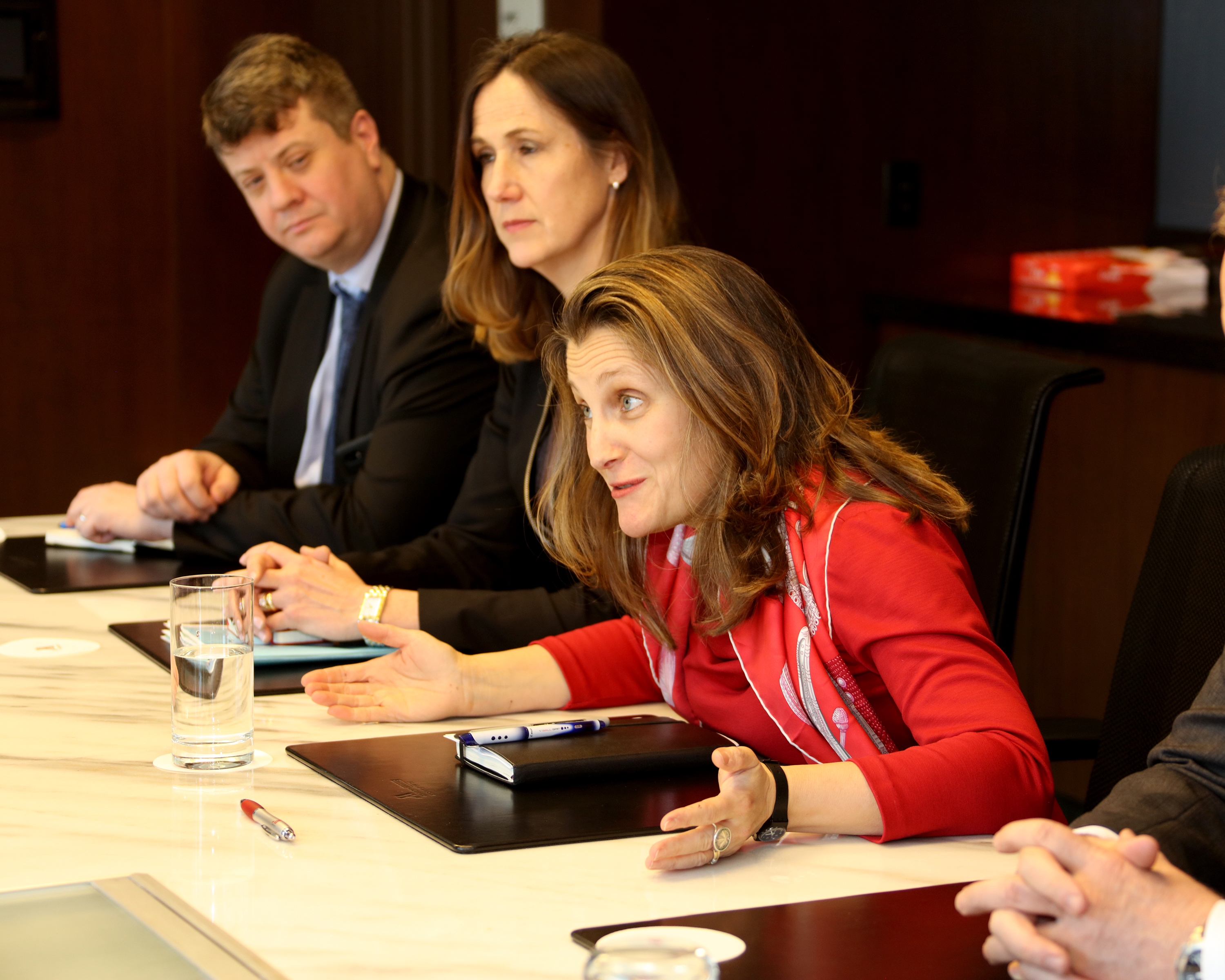
Freeland attending an intergovernmental meeting with provincial premiers, February 2020

In March 2020, she was chosen as the chair for the Cabinet committee on the federal response to COVID-19. During the pandemic, Freeland developed a close working relationship with the premier of Ontario, Doug Ford—a Progressive Conservative—despite the Liberals having used the Ford government's track record to campaign against the federal Conservatives during previous fall's election campaign.

==== Minister of Finance (2020–2024) ====
After Bill Morneau resigned on August 17, 2020, as a result of the WE Charity scandal, Trudeau announced a cabinet shuffle with Freeland being appointed as minister of finance and Dominic LeBlanc, president of the Privy Council, replacing her as minister of intergovernmental affairs. It was the first appointment of a woman to the position. She presented her first federal budget to the House of Commons on April 19, 2021. It announced the creation of a national child care program in Canada. The federal government proposed it would cover half the costs of the child care program, with the provinces responsible for the other half.

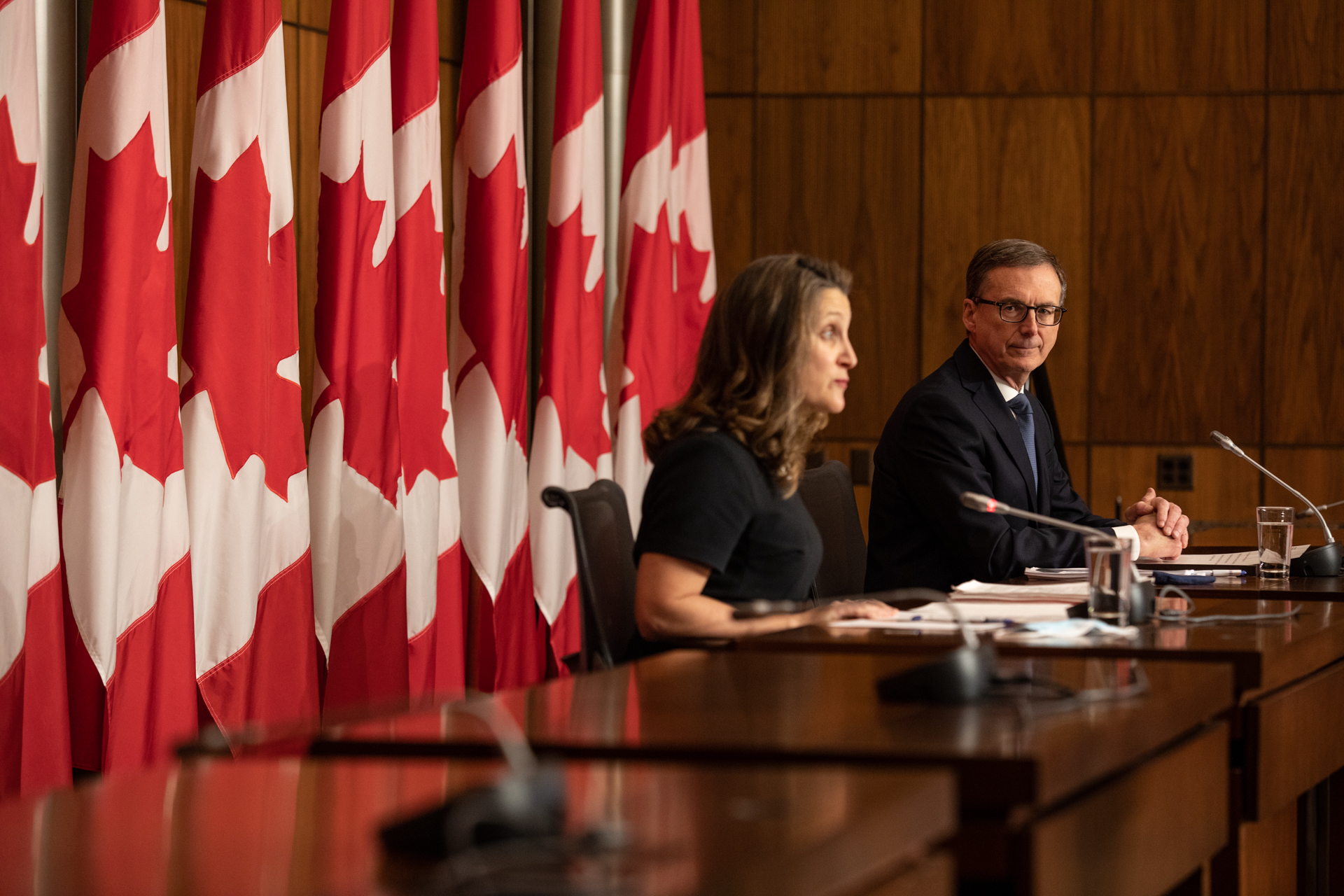
Freeland at the National Press Building, announcing the Bank of Canada monetary policy framework, December 2021

On February 14, 2022, Trudeau invoked the Emergencies Act to end blockades and the occupation from the convoy protest in Ottawa, although the blockade at the Ambassador Bridge had been cleared by police the day before and RCMP Commissioner, Brenda Lucki, would later testify the extraordinary powers granted by the Emergencies Act were not needed at the borders. As Minister of Finance, Freeland worked with RCMP and financial institutions to block financial services to participants. Although banks were granted immunity against civil suits from customers, Freeland insisted, during a press conference, that Charter rights remained in place.

In June 2022, Freeland testified before a special parliamentary committee to answer questions about the decision. She described her appearance as "adversarial", and several committee members stated that she was evasive and did not offer new information. Though she did not say which cabinet member put forward the suggestion to invoke the Act, she stated, "I would like to take the personal responsibility for that decision, it was my opinion it was the correct decision".

As Finance Minister, Freeland promoted programs such as the First Home Savings Account and Homebuyers' Plan, intended to make housing more affordable amidst the Canadian property bubble. She implemented a digital services tax on Canadian-source revenue of global digital corporations, saying a robust tax base requires "those who do business in Canada paying their fair share of tax." In response to a question about the 2021–2023 inflation surge from the Parliamentary Press Gallery, Freeland encouraged Canadians to “cut that Disney+ subscription” to deal with the resulting cost-of-living crisis. She later apologized for the remark.

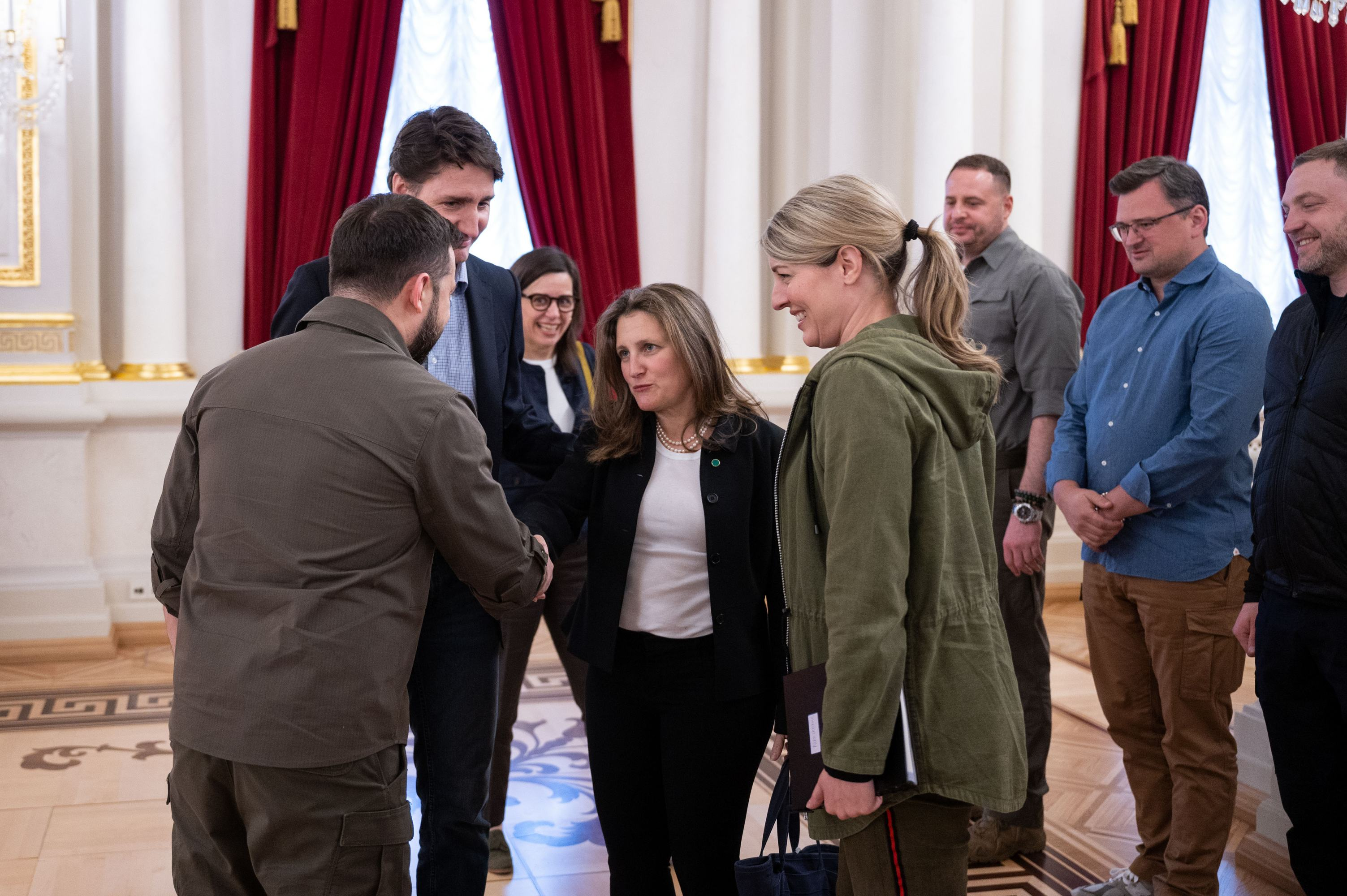
Freeland meets with Ukrainian President Volodymyr Zelenskyy in Kyiv, May 2022

Freeland was at the forefront of the Canadian government's response to the Russian invasion of Ukraine in late February 2022. She knows some Ukrainian and when the invasion began, she said in Ukrainian, "now is the time to be strong". She was the first to call for sanctions on the Central Bank of Russia, which were eventually imposed, and she spoke nearly daily with Ukrainian Prime Minister Denys Shmyhal.

=== Resignation from the Trudeau government ===
On December 16, 2024, Freeland unexpectedly resigned from the Trudeau cabinet hours before she was to deliver the fall economic statement, citing policy disagreements with Trudeau on tax breaks, disbursements, and tariffs proposed by US President-elect Donald Trump on Canadian goods. When asked on December 13 about reports that Trudeau wanted to replace her and about his unwillingness to publicly support her, Freeland stated her focus was on serving Canadians and not "Ottawa gossip". Following her resignation, opposition party leaders Pierre Poilievre and Jagmeet Singh announced their support for a vote of no confidence, which would trigger a general election. Freeland's resignation "sent shockwaves" through the Canadian political establishment, with Trudeau announcing his resignation as prime minister on January 6.

==== 2025 leadership campaign ====
On January 17, 2025, Freeland announced her candidacy in the 2025 Liberal Party of Canada leadership election. In February 2025, a Canadian government task force reported that a coordinated social media campaign linked to the government of the People's Republic of China targeted Freeland. During the campaign, Freeland received 27 endorsements from Liberal caucus members, and proposed asking fellow leadership contestant Mark Carney to serve as finance minister in her prospective ministry. Freeland received 11,134 votes (8%) in the election, placing in a distant second behind winner Mark Carney who received 131,674 (86%) of the vote, falling short of general expectations.

=== Minister of Transport and Internal Trade (2025) ===
Freeland was appointed minister of transport and internal trade in Mark Carney's cabinet on March 14, 2025. She resigned from cabinet on September 16, 2025, and announced that she will not be running for re-election in the next federal election.

=== Backbench MP (2025–2026) ===
Freeland resigned from Cabinet on September 16, 2025. She was subsequently appointed to be the Canadian special representative for the reconstruction of Ukraine, as parliamentary secretary to the prime minister. Freeland's role as special representative for the reconstruction of Ukraine was not a formal diplomatic position. A Global Affairs Canada official explained to a Senate committee that the function of Freeland's role would be to "detect opportunities" for the Canadian private sector in areas such as re-developing infrastructure.

On January 5, 2026, Ukrainian president Volodymyr Zelenskyy appointed Freeland as an economic development adviser to the Office of the President of Ukraine but did not announce her immediate resignation from Parliament. The appointment was criticized by Opposition MPs, with Conservative Michael Chong saying that she could not take on the dual roles of serving as a "Canadian MP and an adviser to a foreign government" and urging her to relinquish either of her positions. That day, Freeland announced she would be resigning as special representative, as well as her seat in Parliament. Her resignation from the House of Commons took effect on January 9, 2026.

== Post-political career (2026–present) ==
On November 19, 2025, Freeland was announced as the next warden of Rhodes House and chief executive officer of the Rhodes Trust, starting July 1, 2026. In February 2026, the Commissioner of Canada Elections found that she "unknowingly" violated Elections Canada rules when she praised Liberal candidate Leslie Church at a government announcement in the midst of the 2024 Toronto—St. Paul's federal by-election. The Commissioner fined Freeland $900, which was paid by the University—Rosedale Liberal electoral district association.

Since February 2026, Freeland has been a contributor to Bloomberg News as a regular panelist on Wall Street Week and other Bloomberg Television programming, as well as an essayist for Bloomberg Weekend. Her political memoir, Unreliable Boyfriend, was released on October 19, 2026.

== Views ==
Freeland has described her political philosophy as being "simply Canadian", as well as feminist. She holds economically and fiscally centrist policy positions aligned with the aims of public economics while being a proponent of a liberal internationalist foreign policy.

=== Economics ===
During her Liberal leadership campaign in 2025, Freeland proposed replacing the carbon tax with a system collaboratively developed with the provinces and territories, scrapping the increase to inclusion rate on capital gains tax, capping profit margins on essential goods, and making shrinkflation illegal.

==== "New plutocracy" ====
In January/February 2011 issue of The Atlantic, Freeland argues that the public perception that Canada and the United States are becoming increasingly plutocratic since the Great Recession is not unfounded, explaining that those of first- and second-generation wealth in an increasingly globalized economy live lives fundamentally different from those of the middle and working class. She explains that they are a "hard working, highly educated, jet-setting meritocratic who feel they are the deserving winners of a tough worldwide economic competition—and many of them, as a result, have an ambivalent attitude toward those of us who didn't succeed so spectacularly." She further adds that they are "becoming a transglobal community of peers who have more in common with one another than with their countrymen back home…today's super-rich are increasingly a nation unto themselves."

===== Globalization =====
Freeland argues that the rise of plutocracy is due to advances in information technology and expansion of free trade. She explains that, within a global perspective, free trade has been overwhelmingly positive within the developing countries, citing per capita income growth in China and India between 1973 and 2002, but that income inequality has also worsened in developed and developing economies. She attributes this to developments in associated technologies allowing the growth of corporations to increase international competition and disruptive technological innovation even faster, thus allowing increases in shareholder values and executive pay increases for CEOs. She further explains that corporations have benefitted financially from economic upheaval, with expanded access to labour, customers, and capital lowering traditional barriers to market entry, where she goes on to cite the growth and success of Facebook under Mark Zuckerberg in challenging Google's share of the market. In her arguments, she cites the work of economists Peter Lindert, Emmanuel Saez, and Thomas Piketty.

===== Philanthropy and capitalism =====
Freeland has argued that the financially affluent "have long recognized that philanthropy, in addition to its moral rewards, can also serve as a pathway to social acceptance and even immortality", citing examples such as George Soros's efforts through his Open Society Foundations and Pete Peterson's utilization of a US$1 billion windfall from Blackstone Inc. to fund political efforts to limiting entitlement spending, among others. She argues that a measure of the importance of public engagement for those who are financially affluent is the pace in which they are developing private foundations and think tanks.

===== Plutocrats as a global community =====
Freeland contends that the "new plutocracy" is "forming a global community, and their ties to one another are increasingly closer than their ties to hoi polloi back home". She explains that the American commercial elite engaged in this trend later than their contemporaries internationally, but that they are catching up, with a younger generation of CEOs having significantly more international business experience. Elaborating on the trend, she explains "there is a growing sense that American businesses that don't internationalize aggressively risk being left behind."

==== American agriculture and family farming ====
In the July/August 2012 issue of The Atlantic, Freeland argues that the 2010s growth in family farming within the United States "holds lessons for America's economic future". She cites technological innovation and global integration as factors for the industry's growth in the United States amidst disruptive technological advancement and change. Further elaborating on the technological factors for this growth, she explains: "Continuous technological improvements have resulted in a system of crop farming that someone who left the countryside 20 years ago would be hard-pressed to recognize and certainly couldn't operate." She also adds that the "biggest reason rural bank accounts are swelling today isn't technology ... It is, rather, the growing global middle class", with the growth of prices in surging prices for feed grains like corn, soybeans, wheat, and canola due to the changing diets of emerging markets, in which she cites Chris Erickson. Because of these trends, she argues that "the agricultural boom shows that globalization really is a two-way street, and not just for the geniuses at Apple and Goldman Sachs" but also as a means of helping sustain and grow the middle class.

==== Central banking's role in the Great Recession ====
Freeland has praised the efforts of Federal Reserve chair Ben Bernanke and European Central Bank president Mario Draghi for respectively growing the American economy and strengthening the eurozone after the Great Recession. At the same time, she warns that, if "the ability to pump money into the economy is central bankers' superpower, then weaning their economies off this nearly free money is their kryptonite", with the likelihood of recession again growing without the former. On the other hand, she explains: "A lot of major investors harbour a different fear: that easy money is muffling ordinary market signals and thus creating dangerous—and dangerously invisible—bubbles."

=== Energy policy ===
In 2012, Freeland wrote for The Atlantic that due to new discoveries and technological developments, the end of the fossil fuel industry is not imminent. She explains that this trend will lead to new winners in the global economy such as Brazil, while it could complicate domestic policies in other major oil producers and exporters such as Canada. She added that this trend will intensify political debate around environmental issues, such as the controversy over Keystone XL.

=== Foreign policy ===
In 2025, she proposed that Canada spend 2% of its GDP on defence (the NATO target) by 2027 by enlarging the military and increasing troop wages.

==== Social media, protests, and revolutions ====
In another article for the July/August 2012 issue of The Atlantic, Freeland argued that platforms like Twitter are able to quickly mobilize revolutions, especially in authoritarian states, but that such movements end up losing out to more radical elements, citing the growing popularity of the Islamist movements during the Arab Spring. She instead argues that traditional revolutionary movements, such as the Bolsheviks, Solidarity, and the African National Congress, were centralized with a core of devoted members with the ability to act as a government-in-waiting.

== Family and personal life ==
Freeland is married to Graham Bowley, a British writer and reporter for The New York Times. The couple has three children. She has lived in Toronto since the summer of 2013 when she returned from abroad to run for election. She speaks Ukrainian at home with her children. She is also proficient in English, Russian, Italian, and French. In 2014, John Geddes reported that Freeland and her sister co-owned an apartment overlooking the central square of Kyiv, Maidan Nezalezhnosti. Freeland also owns properties in London in the United Kingdom.

Mark Carney, who ran against her in the 2025 Liberal Party leadership election, is the godfather of her son.

=== Ancestry ===
Freeland's paternal grandfather, Wilbur Freeland, was a farmer and lawyer who rode in the annual Calgary Stampede; his sister, Beulah, was the wife of a federal member of Parliament, Ged Baldwin. Her paternal grandmother, Helen Caulfield, was a World War II war bride from Glasgow. Freeland's mother, Halyna Chomiak, was born at a hospital administered by the US Army; her parents were staying at the displaced persons camp at the spa resort in Bad Wörishofen in Bavaria, Germany. Halyna's Ukrainian Catholic parents were Mykhailo Khomiak (Ukrainian: Михайло Хомяк, anglicized as Michael Chomiak), born in Stroniatyn, Galicia, and Alexandra Loban, originally of Rudniki, near Stanislaviv (now Ivano-Frankivsk).

Freeland's maternal grandfather, Michael Chomiak, had been a journalist before World War II. During the war in Nazi-occupied Poland and later in Nazi-occupied Austria, he was chief editor of the Ukrainian daily newspaper Krakivs'ki Visti (Kraków News) for the Nazi regime. After Chomiak's death in 1984, John-Paul Himka, a professor of history at the University of Alberta, who was Chomiak's son-in-law (and also Freeland's uncle by marriage), used Chomiak's records, including old issues of the newspaper, as the basis of several scholarly papers focused on the coverage of Soviet mass murders of Ukrainian civilians. These papers also examined the use of these massacres as Nazi propaganda against Jews. In 2017, when Russian-affiliated websites, such as Russia Insider and New Cold War, further publicized Chomiak's connection to Nazism, Freeland and her spokespeople responded by claiming that this was a Russian disinformation campaign during her appointment to the position of minister of foreign affairs. Her office later denied Chomiak ever collaborated with Nazi Germany; however, reporting by The Globe and Mail showed that Freeland had known of her grandfather's Nazi ties since at least 1996, when she helped edit a scholarly article by Himka for the Journal of Ukrainian Studies.

== Electoral history ==
2025 Canadian federal election: University—Rosedale
| Party | Candidate | Votes | % | ±% |
|---|---|---|---|---|
| Liberal | Chrystia Freeland | 39,847 | 64.00 | +17.51 |
| Conservative | Liz Grade | 14,624 | 23.49 | +5.54 |
| New Democratic | Serena Purdy | 6,168 | 9.91 | –18.17 |
| Green | Ignacio Mongrell | 1,066 | 1.71 | –2.73 |
| Communist | Drew Garvie | 304 | 0.49 | +0.03 |
| Marxist–Leninist | Barbara Biley | 138 | 0.22 | N/A |
| Independent | Adam Golding | 118 | 0.19 | N/A |
| Total valid votes | | 62,265 | 99.26 | |
| Total rejected ballots | | 466 | 0.74 | -0.14 |
| Turnout | | 62,731 | 65.45 | +6.33 |
| Eligible voters | | 95,844 | | |
| Liberal notional hold | | Swing | | +5.98 |
Source: Elections Canada

2025 Liberal Party of Canada leadership election
| Candidate | First ballot | | | |
| Candidate | Votes | % | Points | % |
|---|---|---|---|---|
| Mark Carney | 131,674 | 86.84 | 29,456.91 | 85.88 |
| Chrystia Freeland | 11,134 | 7.34 | 2,728.57 | 7.96 |
| Karina Gould | 4,785 | 3.16 | 1,100.34 | 3.21 |
| Frank Baylis | 4,038 | 2.66 | 1,014.18 | 2.96 |
| Total valid votes | 151,899 | 100.00 | 34,300.00 | 100.00 |
| Turnout | 151,899 | 92.71 | | |
| Eligible voters | 163,836 | | | |
Source: Liberal Party

2021 Canadian federal election: University—Rosedale
| Party | Candidate | Votes | % | ±% | Expenditures |
|---|---|---|---|---|---|
| Liberal | Chrystia Freeland | 21,716 | 47.53 | −4.14 | $85,780.47 |
| New Democratic | Nicole Robicheau | 11,921 | 25.24 | +3.33 | $32,287.56 |
| Conservative | Steven Taylor | 9,473 | 20.06 | +3.78 | $97,838.32 |
| Green | Tim Grant | 1,974 | 4.18 | −4.29 | $23,475.69 |
| People's | David Kent | 1,172 | 2.48 | +1.59 | $5,169.67 |
| Communist | Drew Garvie | 244 | 0.52 | +0.27 | $0.00 |
| Total valid votes/expense limit | | 47,235 | 99.12 | – | $109,583.59 |
| Total rejected ballots | | 420 | 0.88 | +0.39 | |
| Turnout | | 47,655 | 60.41 | -8.67 | |
| Eligible voters | | 78,886 | | | |
| Liberal hold | | Swing | | –3.73 | |
Source: Elections Canada

2019 Canadian federal election: University—Rosedale
| Party | Candidate | Votes | % | ±% | Expenditures |
|---|---|---|---|---|---|
| Liberal | Chrystia Freeland | 29,652 | 51.67 | +1.87 | $83,556.09 |
| New Democratic | Melissa Jean-Baptiste Vajda | 12,573 | 21.91 | −6.68 | $28,390.50 |
| Conservative | Helen-Claire Tingling | 9,342 | 16.28 | −1.23 | $38,588.65 |
| Green | Tim Grant | 4,861 | 8.47 | +5.54 | $33,386.65 |
| People's | Aran Lockwood | 510 | 0.89 | – | none listed |
| Animal Protection | Liz White | 159 | 0.28 | +0.05 | none listed |
| Communist | Drew Garvie | 143 | 0.25 | +0.03 | none listed |
| Stop Climate Change | Karin Brothers | 124 | 0.22 | – | none listed |
| Marxist–Leninist | Steve Rutschinski | 27 | 0.05 | −0.04 | none listed |
| Total valid votes/expense limit | | 57,391 | 99.51 | | |
| Total rejected ballots | | 281 | 0.49 | -0.05 | |
| Turnout | | 57,672 | 69.08 | -3.74 | |
| Eligible voters | | 83,485 | | | |
| Liberal hold | | Swing | | +4.28 | |
Source: Elections Canada

2015 Canadian federal election: University—Rosedale
| Party | Candidate | Votes | % | ±% | Expenditures |
|---|---|---|---|---|---|
| Liberal | Chrystia Freeland | 27,849 | 49.80 | +19.23 | $185,406.36 |
| New Democratic | Jennifer Hollett | 15,988 | 28.59 | −15.24 | $142,562.73 |
| Conservative | Karim Jivraj | 9,790 | 17.51 | −2.62 | $83,600.78 |
| Green | Nick Wright | 1,641 | 2.93 | −1.73 | $19,152.70 |
| Libertarian | Jesse Waslowski | 233 | 0.42 | – | $393.64 |
| Animal Alliance | Simon Luisi | 126 | 0.23 | – | $153.10 |
| Communist | Drew Garvie | 125 | 0.22 | – | – |
| Bridge | David Berlin | 122 | 0.22 | – | – |
| Marxist–Leninist | Steve Rutchinski | 51 | 0.09 | – | – |
| Total valid votes/expense limit | | 55,925 | 99.47 | | $206,261.82 |
| Total rejected ballots | | 300 | 0.53 | – | |
| Turnout | | 56,225 | 72.83 | – | |
| Eligible voters | | 77,205 | | | |
| Liberal notional gain from New Democratic | | Swing | | +17.23 | |
Source: Elections Canada

Canadian federal by-election, November 25, 2013: Toronto Centre (federal electoral district) Resignation of Bob Rae (July 31, 2013)
| Party | Candidate | Votes | % | ±% | Expenditures |
|---|---|---|---|---|---|
| Liberal | Chrystia Freeland | 17,194 | 49.38 | +8.37 | $ 97,609.64 |
| New Democratic | Linda McQuaig | 12,640 | 36.30 | +6.09 | 99,230.30 |
| Conservative | Geoff Pollock | 3,004 | 8.63 | −14.01 | 75,557.39 |
| Green | John Deverell | 1,034 | 2.97 | −2.05 | 21,521.10 |
| Progressive Canadian | Dorian Baxter | 453 | 1.30 | | – |
| Libertarian | Judi Falardeau | 236 | 0.68 | +0.18 | – |
| Independent | Kevin Clarke | 84 | 0.24 | | 560.00 |
| Independent | John "The Engineer" Turmel | 56 | 0.16 | | – |
| Independent | Leslie Bory | 51 | 0.15 | | 633.30 |
| Online | Michael Nicula | 43 | 0.12 | | 200.00 |
| Independent | Bahman Yazdanfar | 26 | 0.07 | −0.12 | 1,134.60 |
| Total valid votes/expense limit | | 34,821 | 99.49 | – | $ 101,793.06 |
| Total rejected ballots | | 177 | 0.51 | +0.12 | |
| Turnout | | 34,998 | 37.72 | −25.21 | |
| Eligible voters | | 92,780 | | | |
| Liberal hold | | Swing | | +1.14 | |
Source(s) "November 25, 2013 By-elections Poll-by-poll results". Elections Canada. "November 25, 2013 By-election – Financial Reports".

== Bibliography ==
- Freeland, Chrystia (2000). Sale of the Century: Russia's Wild Ride from Communism to Capitalism. Crown Business. ISBN 0-8129-3215-3.
- Freeland, Chrystia (2012). Plutocrats: The Rise of the New Global Super-Rich and the Fall of Everyone Else. Penguin Books. ISBN 978-1-84614-252-9.
- Tsalikis, Catherine (2025). Chrystia: From Peace River to Parliament Hill. ISBN 978-1-4870-1121-5.
- Freeland, Chrystia (2026). Unreliable Boyfriend. ISBN 9781668245903.

== See also ==
- List of female finance ministers
- List of female foreign ministers

== Notes ==
30th Canadian Ministry (2025–present) – Cabinet of Mark Carney
Cabinet post (1)
| Predecessor | Office | Successor |
|---|---|---|
| Anita Anand | Minister of Transport and Internal Trade; 2025 | Steven MacKinnon (Transport); Dominic LeBlanc (Internal Trade) |
29th Canadian Ministry (2015–2025) – Cabinet of Justin Trudeau
Cabinet posts (5)
| Predecessor | Office | Successor |
| Ed Fast | Minister of International Trade; 2015–2017 | François-Philippe Champagne |
| Stéphane Dion | Minister of Foreign Affairs; 2017–2019 | François-Philippe Champagne |
| Dominic LeBlanc | Minister of Intergovernmental Affairs; 2019–2020 | Dominic LeBlanc |
| Anne McLellan | Deputy Prime Minister of Canada; 2019–2024 | Vacant |
| Bill Morneau | Minister of Finance; 2020–2024 | Dominic LeBlanc |
