= Domestic policy of the Justin Trudeau government =

Several policies regarding interior and domestic issues in Canada were planned and adopted by the Canadian Cabinet, chaired by Prime Minister Justin Trudeau, following the October 19, 2015, election of the Liberal Party to a majority of seats in the House of Commons, such as social and environmental policies.

The government's economic policy relied on increased tax revenues to pay for increased government spending. While the government did not balance the budget in its first term, it purported being fiscally responsible by reducing the country's debt-to-GDP ratio every year until 2020, when the COVID-19 pandemic hit. Trudeau's progressive social policy included strong advocacy for feminism and abortion rights, and introduced the right to voluntary euthanasia.

Government environmental policy included introducing new commitments to reducing greenhouse gas emissions by 40% to 45% before 2030, and to achieve net-zero emissions by 2050. The main tool for reaching this target is a federal carbon pricing policy. Parliament also adopted legislation for marine conservation, banning six common single-use plastic products, and strengthening environmental impact assessments. However, the government continued to support oil and gas pipelines to bring Canadian fossil fuel resources to foreign markets.

The government set targets to welcome an increased number of immigrants and refugees. Canada also legalized cannabis for recreational use in 2018. In 2021, Trudeau announced the creation of a national child care plan with the intention of reducing day care fees for parents down to CA$10 per day per child within five years. Trudeau also revised the Safe Third Country Agreement in 2023, which led to the closing of the unofficial border crossing on Roxham Road.

== Economic policy ==
=== Infrastructure ===
During the 2015 election campaign, Trudeau said that if made prime minister, he would implement an infrastructure plan worth CA$60 billion (US$42 billion) in spending over ten years. Following his electoral win, in 2016, the Trudeau announced a 12-year, CA$180 billion (US$143 billion) infrastructure plan, with a focus on public transport, infrastructure in rural communities and Canada's northern regions, green infrastructure and affordable housing. The Trudeau government also set up the Canada Infrastructure Bank to fund projects.

Shortly before his resignation, Trudeau announced the Alto high speed rail project between Toronto and Quebec City.

=== Trans-Pacific Partnership ===
During the 2015 election campaign, Trudeau pledged to study the Trans-Pacific Partnership (TPP) before making a final decision on ratification. Trudeau said that Canadians should know what effects TPP would have on different industries, adding that he would hold an open and serious discussion with Canadians.

After the United States withdrew from the TPP, Canada joined the Comprehensive and Progressive Agreement for Trans-Pacific Partnership, which incorporates most of the provisions of the TPP and which entered into force on December 30, 2018.

=== Bombardier ===
Trudeau's government provided a CA$372.5 million bailout to Bombardier in February 2017. It was later revealed that Bombardier executives received US$32 million of these funds in bonuses, while laying off 14,500 workers around the world that year. Patrick Pichette, a director of Bombardier Inc., sits as a board member of the Trudeau Foundation.

=== Taxes ===
Upon entering office, Trudeau's government made some changes to the tax code. A new tax bracket on the top one percent of income earners was created in 2016. Incomes over $200,000 became taxed at 33%. They increased taxes on companies' passive income when it is paid out as dividend. They also limited "the practice of "income sprinkling", which involves paying income to family members, even if they don't work for the business, so that business owners can avoid paying higher taxes".

In the 2017 Canadian federal budget, excise duties on alcohol were increased by 2%, Uber became subject to the same taxes as taxis; and tax benefits for public transit users, the tourism sector and employers who create childcare spaces were eliminated.

The 2021 Canadian federal budget included a host of new targeted taxes, including taxes on luxury cars, jets or boats, a 1% tax on vacant homes owned by non-Canadian citizens, and a tax on digital services (dubbed the "Netflix tax"). The budget also created a tax on vaping products, and increased the tax on cigarettes.

=== Social programs ===
==== Canada Child Benefit ====
Canada Child Tax Benefit was eliminated in 2016 and replaced by the Canada Child Benefit (CCB), a tax-free payment targeting low- and middle-income families; those with incomes higher than $150,000 will receive less than the previous system. In 2018-19 benefit year, the CCB payments are up to $6,496 per year per child under the age of 6, and up to $5,481 per year per child aged 6 to 17 in benefit year 2018–19. The CCB is income-dependent; the first income threshold for families to receive Canada Child Benefit is $30,450 and the second threshold is $65,975 in 2018–19. Since its inception, the Canada Child Benefit has lifted about 300,000 of children out of poverty, and has helped reduce child poverty by 40% from 2013 to 2017. The budget for Canada Child Benefit has been increased in 2019, increasing the annual benefit to a maximum of $6,639 for children under 6 and $5,602 for ages 6 through 17, allowing parents to provide more due to the increased cost of living.

==== Canada Pension Plan reforms ====
In 2017, Trudeau's government moved to enhance the Canada Pension Plan to provide working Canadians with more income in retirement. These changes were principally motivated by the declining share of the workforce that was covered by an employer defined-benefit pension plan, which had fallen from 48 per cent of men in 1971 to 25 per cent by 2011. They were given additional impetus by moves on the part of the government of Ontario to launch the Ontario Retirement Pension Plan, a supplementary provincial pension plan intended to begin in 2018.

Unlike the existing, or base, CPP, the enhancement to the Canada Pension Plan will be fully funded, meaning that benefits under the enhancement will slowly accrue each year as individuals work and make contributions. Additionally, the enhancement of the Canada Pension Plan will be phased-in over a period of seven years, starting in 2019. When fully mature, the enhanced CPP will provide a replacement rate of one third (33.33 per cent) of covered earnings, up from the quarter (25 per cent) provided prior to the enhancement. Additionally, the maximum amount of income covered by the CPP will increase by 14 per cent by 2025 (projected by the Chief Actuary of Canada to be $79,400 in 2025, compared to the projected normal limit of $69,700 in the same year in the 28th Actuarial Report on the CPP). The combination of the increased replacement rate and increased earnings limit will result in individuals receiving retirement pensions 33 per cent to 50 per cent higher, depending on their earnings across their working years. (The maximum retirement pension will increase by 50 per cent, but will require 40 years of contributions on earnings at the new maximum). Workers earning the 2016 maximum covered wage of $54,900 a year would receive an additional $4,390 annually (approximately $365.83 monthly).

To finance the expanded pensions and maintain the soundness of the plan, contributions to the CPP from workers and their employers will each rise 1 per cent from current levels, to 5.95 per cent over the existing band of covered earnings. This increase will be phased in over 5 years, starting in 2019. The increase to the earnings threshold will be phased in over 2 years, starting in 2024. Workers and their employers will contribute 4 per cent on earnings in this range (which is to say earnings above the normal earnings limit and below the new increased one). To ease the impact of the increased contribution on near-term disposable income, worker contributions will become tax-deductible.

==== Canadian Dental Care Plan ====
In the 2022 federal budget, the Trudeau government introduced the Canada Dental Benefit. With this program, the government provides $650 per year in dental coverage until late 2024 for each child under 12 in families with incomes of less than $70,000 a year. The program also allows the government to provide $390 per child per year and $260 per child per year for families with incomes between $70,000 and $79,000 and $80,000 and $89,000 respectively.

==== $10-a-day child care ====
The 2021 federal budget tabled by Finance Minister Chrystia Freeland marked a new era in child care policy, though it built on the earlier Multilateral Early Learning and Child Care Framework agreements. The budget included approximately CA$30 billion over 5 years for a "Canada-wide early learning and child care plan". The funds will "offset the cost of early learning and child care services" towards the creation a national child-care system. The stated goal of the child care plan was to reduce the average cost of child care by 50% by 2022 and to make $10-a-day child care universally available by 2025–26. As child care falls under provincial jurisdiction, his national program required all provinces and territories to sign onto the program. British Columbia was the first province to sign onto the plan in the summer of 2021, but all provinces and territories have now signed onto the plan.

On March 6, 2025, Trudeau announced that a $37 billion, five-year deal had been reached with all provinces and territories except Alberta and Saskatchewan to extend the child care program until 2031, with annual 3% funding increases after new deal's first year in 2026–27. Organizational and logistic issues with starting the program, inflation, and labour shortages meant that at the time of the announcement, only 150,000 of the originally announced 250,000 spots had been created, with the remaining spaces planned to be created within the first year of the new deal.

=== Budgets ===
==== 2016 Canadian federal budget ====
Finance Minister Bill Morneau presented the Canadian federal budget to the House of Commons of Canada on March 22, 2016, reporting a projected deficit of $29.4 billion for the fiscal year 2016-2017 and a reduction in the deficit of $14.3 billion by FY2020. According to the Annual Financial Report of the Government of Canada 2016-2017 the revised deficit was $17.8 billion as of the end of March 2017.

==== 2017 Canadian federal budget ====
Minister Morneau presented his second budget "Building a Strong Middle Class" on March 22, 2017, in which he projected a deficit of $28.5 billion which risk adjustment of $3 billion. It was adjusted again following the 2017-2018 Annual Financial Report of the Government of Canada to $19.0 billion. A "retroactive change" was made to the accounting "methodology for the determination of the discount rate for unfunded pension obligations". As a result of this change in auditing, revisions were recommended by the Auditor General for budget numbers from 2006 through 2016. What had been reported as a small surplus in FY 2014–15, was audited as a small deficit with these retroactive changes.

==== 2018 Canadian federal budget ====
Minister Morneau presented the FY 2018–2019 budget which projected a deficit of $18.1 billion. The 2018-2019 Annual Financial Report of the Government of Canada revised the deficit to $14.0 billion. The government also announced the Canada Summer Jobs program in 2018.

==== 2019 Canadian federal budget ====
Minister Morneau's FY2019-2020 federal budget presented on March 19, 2019, projected a deficit of $19.8 billion. The budget included new spending of $22.8 billion for the period covering 2019 through 2026. Among the new expenditures is the six-month grace period for students in which interest charges on Canada Student Loans will be eliminated. The Employment Insurance job training program accounts for an additional $586.5-million a year in expenses. There were no changes in bracketing for either corporations or individuals in terms of income tax.

==== 2021 Canadian federal budget ====
Canada's 2021–2022 budget was presented by Finance Minister Chrystia Freeland on April 19, 2021. It was Canada's first budget after the 2019 elections and the start of the COVID-19 pandemic. It included, among other things, the creation of a national $10 per day childcare plan.

==== 2022 Canadian federal budget ====
The 2022 federal budget increased Canada's military expenditures. It also introduced a limited dental care program, as promised in the Liberal-NDP deal.

==== 2023 Canadian federal budget ====
The 2023 budget introduced cuts to the vast majority of federal departments and agencies. It also included investments in renewable energy and green technologies.

== Social policy ==
=== Abortion ===
Trudeau has stated that he wishes to form a party that is "resolutely pro-choice" and that potential Liberal candidates in the 2015 election who are anti-abortion would not be greenlighted for the nomination if they did not agree to vote pro-choice on abortion bills. This stance was in line with a resolution passed by a majority of Liberal party members at its 2012 policy convention. Trudeau's stance was criticized by conservative Catholics, with former MP Jim Karygiannis saying it will "definitely hurt the party", and Toronto cardinal Thomas Collins writing to Trudeau urging him to reverse his ruling, leading Trudeau to defend the position.

=== Religious freedom ===
Trudeau has expressed opposition towards the proposed Quebec Charter of Values, a controversial charter in that province and elsewhere that among other things prohibited public sector employees from wearing or displaying "conspicuous" religious symbols, justifying that it would make the people of Quebec "choose between their freedom of religion and freedom of expression, freedom of conscience and their economic well-being and their acceptance in the workplace. That for me is a real concern." Trudeau has remained on the sidelines of the debate regarding Quebec's Bill 21.

=== Women's rights ===
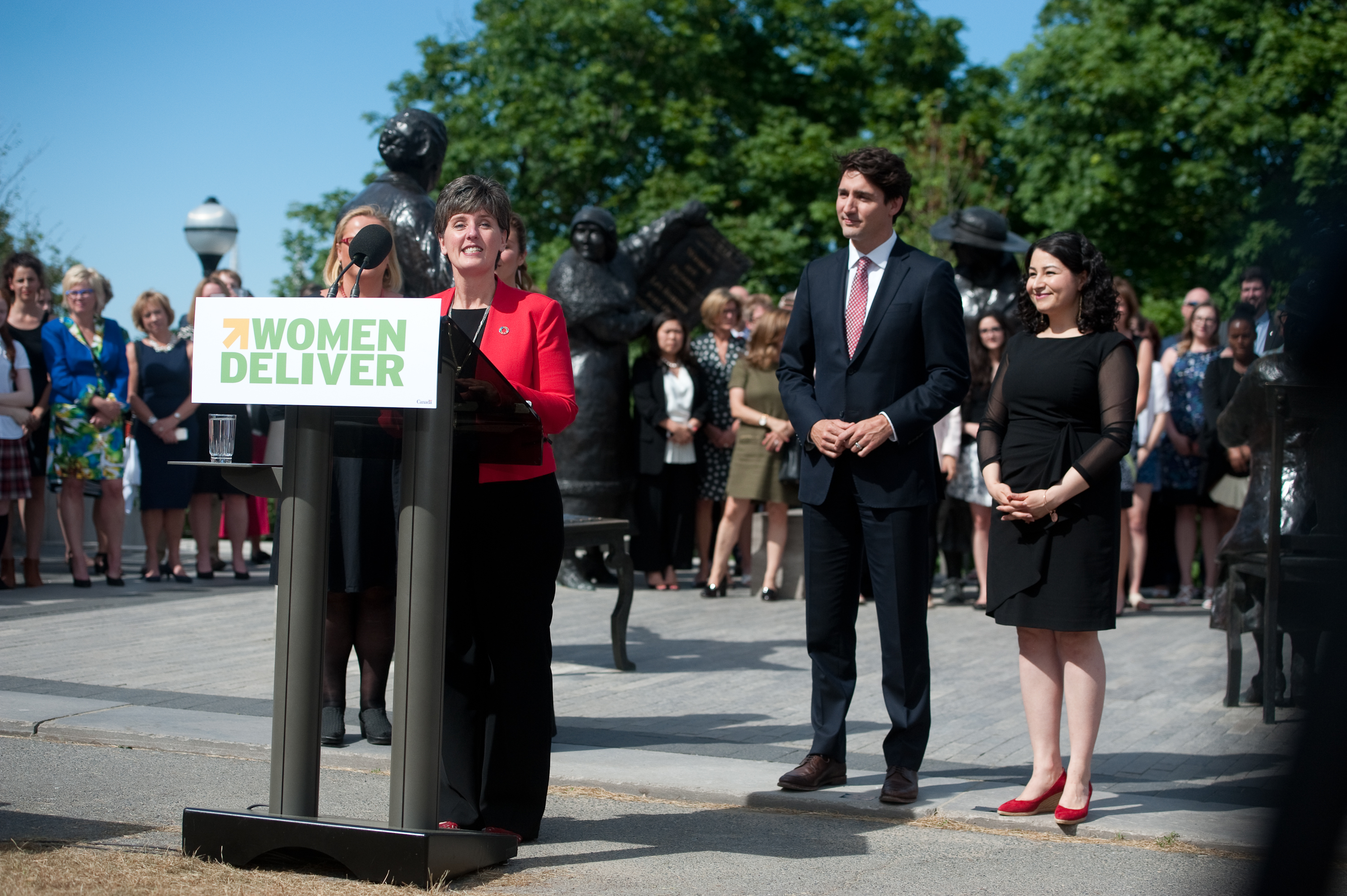
Trudeau with Maryam Monsef and Marie-Claude Bibeau at a Women Deliver event

Trudeau identifies as a feminist, having stated, "I am a feminist. I'm proud to be a feminist," although his claim of being a feminist has been disputed. Trudeau has also stated that "the Liberal Party is unequivocal in its defence of women's rights. We are the party of the Charter." After being sworn in as Prime Minister, when asked by a reporter why he felt gender parity was important when naming his cabinet, he replied, "Because it's 2015." More recently, he has similarly answered to feminist organizations on social media that "On behalf of the Government of Canada, I am writing back to let you know that I wholeheartedly agree: Poverty is Sexist". Then-Minister of Justice Jody Wilson-Raybould was mandated in the November 12 letter to introduce "government legislation to add gender identity as a prohibited ground for discrimination under Canadian law", which was implemented in Bill C-16.

In January 2018, in a speech at the World Economic Forum, Trudeau called for critical discussion on issues brought up by the Me Too movement. Trudeau has also advocated a high standard and holds a "zero tolerance for sexual assault, harassment or other forms of misconduct by his employees or caucus colleagues". As the leader of the Liberal Party, Trudeau initiated investigations on several Members of Parliament resulting in the dismissal of cabinet minister Kent Hehr, the resignation of MP Darshan Kang, and the suspension and later expulsion of MPs Scott Andrews and Massimo Pacetti. In an interview, Trudeau explained that the zero tolerance standard applied to himself as well and stated, "I've been very, very careful all my life to be thoughtful, to be respectful of people's space and people's headspace as well."

However, in 2018, after it was revealed by a woman that a 'groping' incident occurred in 2000, Trudeau said there was no need to conduct an investigation into the allegation. In March 2019, Liberal MP Celina Caesar-Chavannes resigned as a member of the Liberal caucus, citing that Trudeau shouted at her on the phone when she told him she would not like to run in the 2019 federal election. Caesar-Chavannes told The Globe and Mail that Trudeau shouted that she didn't appreciate him. As a result of this resignation, and the resignation of other prominent female liberal members of parliament Jody Wilson-Raybould and Jane Philpott (who resigned from cabinet, but not from caucus following the SNC-Lavalin affair), opposition MPs, such as Candice Bergen, have accused Trudeau of being a "fake feminist". In the April 2019 Daughters of the Vote event organized by Equal Voice Canada in the House of Commons, many of its delegates turned their backs when Trudeau spoke as a protest for his actions in the SNC-Lavalin affair.

Justin Trudeau's entourage knew of complaints of a likely sexual nature against the chief of the Defence Staff of the Canadian Armed Forces. Jonathan Vance, in 2018, and yet did nothing about it. Canadian pundits noted that this incident dealt a severe blow to the Trudeau government's feminist bonafides.

=== LGBT rights ===
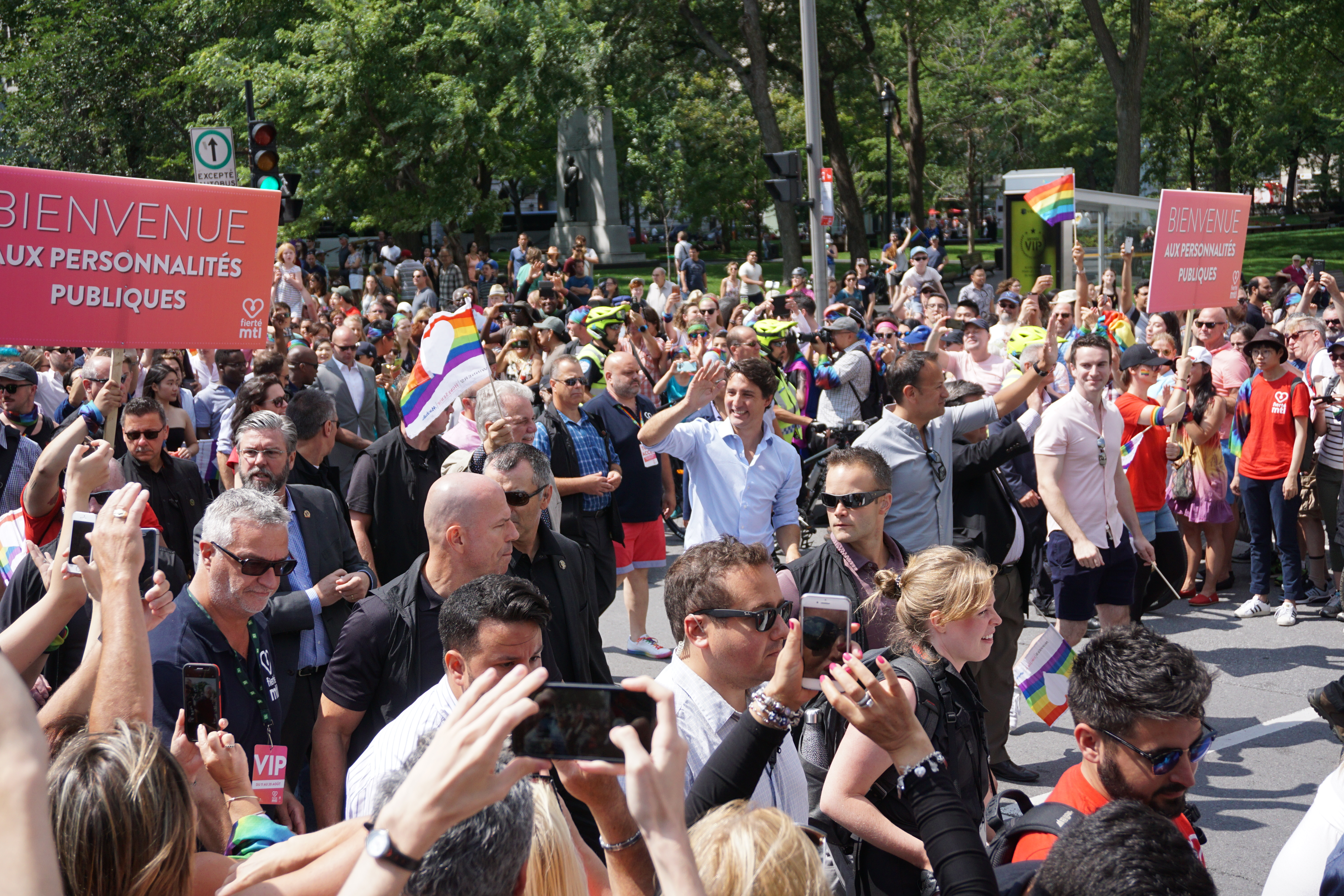
Justin Trudeau at the Fierté Montréal Pride parade of 2017

After the 2019 election, Trudeau directed his Minister of Justice and Attorney General, David Lametti, to prioritize banning conversion therapy under the criminal code. On March 9, 2020, Lemetti formally introduced a bill, though it would expire before being enacted due to Parliament being prorogued in August. On October 1, 2020, Lemetti re-introduced the bill, designed to create criminal offences for performing conversion therapy on a child (under 18), forcing an adult to undergo it, removing a child from Canada to undergo conversion therapy, while also prohibiting advertising or profiting of conversion therapy for both adult and children.

The bill passed the House of Commons by a vote of 263 to 63 on June 22, 2021. However the Senate adjourned for its summer break before the bill could come up for a vote, and the bill died on the order paper when Parliament was dissolved for the 2021 Canadian federal election. On November 29, Lemetti introduced a new version of the bill for the 44th Parliament, which broadened the ban's coverage to include adults, identifying it as one of the priority bills the government hoped to pass before the end of the year. The bill passed the House of Commons on December 1 without a recorded vote after all parties unanimously agreed to expedite it, and likewise passed the Senate on December 7. The bill received royal assent on December 8 and came into force on January 7, 2022.

On July 3, 2016, Trudeau became the first sitting Canadian Prime Minister to march in a pride parade.

=== Medically-assisted dying ===
In the November 12, 2015, mandate letter, Prime Minister Trudeau tasked Jody Wilson-Raybould—who was Minister of Justice and Attorney General from 2015 to January 2019—to work with Jane Philpott, then-Minister of Health, to "respond to the Supreme Court of Canada decision regarding physician-assisted death". She tabled Bill C-14 (2016), which amended the Criminal Code to allow medical assistance in dying. It received royal assent on June 17, 2016.

=== Cannabis ===
Trudeau first publicly expressed an interest in the legalization of cannabis while speaking at a rally in Kelowna, B.C. on June 24, 2013. He told a crowd, "I'm actually not in favour of decriminalizing cannabis. I'm in favour of legalizing it. Tax it, regulate. It's one of the only ways to keep it out of the hands of our kids because the current war on drugs, the current model is not working. We have to use evidence and science to make sure we're moving forward on that."

In an interview in August 2013, Trudeau said that the last time he had used cannabis was in 2010, after he had become a member of parliament: "We had a few good friends over for a dinner party, our kids were at their grandmother's for the night, and one of our friends lit a joint and passed it around. I had a puff." After analysing the results of the legalization of cannabis in Colorado, Trudeau reiterated his position in favour of the legalization in Canada, saying that Canadians would benefit from analysing the experiences of both Colorado and the state of Washington.

After the Liberal party formed the government in November 2015, with Trudeau as prime minister, he announced that a federal-provincial-territorial process was being created to discuss a jointly suitable process for the legalization of cannabis possession for recreational purposes. The plan is to remove cannabis consumption and incidental possession from the Criminal Code; however, new laws will be enacted for greater punishment of those convicted of supplying pot to minors and for impairment while driving a motor vehicle. By late November 2015, Justice Minister Jody Wilson-Raybould said that she and the ministers of Health and Public Safety were working on specifics as to the legislation. In April 2016, the Trudeau government announced that it would aim to introduce legislation to legalize cannabis in spring 2017.

The legislation to legalize cannabis for recreational use (Cannabis Act, Bill C-45) was passed by the House of Commons in late November 2017; it passed second reading in the Senate on March 22, 2018. On June 18, 2018, the House passed the bill with most, but not all, of the Senate's amendments. The Senate accepted this version of the Act the following day. Prime Minister Justin Trudeau announced the next day that recreational use of cannabis would no longer violate criminal law as of October 17, 2018. As of October 17, 2018, cannabis is legal in Canada for both recreational and medicinal use.

On October 17, the first day of legalization, the Government of Canada announced that it intends to grant pardons to Canadians convicted of simple cannabis possession charges.

=== Gun policy ===
Prime Minister Justin Trudeau's remarks announcing a ban on assault-style firearms in Canada

On June 21, 2019, Trudeau's Bill C-71, An Act to Amend certain Acts and Regulations in relation to firearms, received Royal Assent. The New legislation included: extended backgrounds check to a lifetime instead of 5 years, implemented a point-of-sale registration by business, Require authorization to transport restricted and prohibited firearms to locations other than the range (e.g. gunsmith, gun show, etc.) through strengthened transportation requirements; and, Safeguard the impartial classification of firearms by putting the responsibility in the hands of technical experts, who make these determinations based on the Criminal Code, among others.

In the wake of the 2020 Nova Scotia attacks, Trudeau announced on May 1, 2020, that 1,500 models of "assault-style" weapons, largely semi-automatic guns, would be classified as prohibited effective immediately. However, the term "assault-style" is not defined in Canadian law. The law grants a three-year amnesty period to allow current owners to dispose, export, register, or sell them (under a buy-back scheme), and for special uses.

== Environment policy ==
=== Climate change ===
During the 2015 campaign, Trudeau campaigned on increasing regulations for industries and increased action to respond to climate change.

Trudeau's first Minister of Foreign Affairs was Stéphane Dion. Dion is known as being very supportive of climate change policies. Catherine McKenna has been appointed Minister to the newly named Environment and Climate Change. McKenna is known for her legal work surrounding social justice. Trudeau and McKenna garnered the attention of the global media when they attended the COP21 summit in Paris. Canada has committed to: arrest global temperature increase at 1.5 °C, phase out fossil fuels, financially support of clean energy, and assist developing countries to meet their targets.

Pan-Canadian Framework on Clean Growth and Climate Change, Trudeau's national climate strategy, was released in August 2017. Provincial premiers (except Saskatchewan and Manitoba) adopted the proposal on December 9, 2016.

Trudeau initially worked with the previous government's commitment to reducing greenhouse gas emissions by 30% before 2030. In 2019, Trudeau set the most ambitious secondary target of achieving net-zero emissions by 2050. In 2021, Trudeau increased its 2030 target, pledging to reduce Canada's emissions by 40% to 45% within nine years. However, none of these changes were accompanied by policies that would allow Canada to reach the new targets, let alone the old target.

While the Liberal government has fulfilled many of its program commitments relating to climate change, environment commissioner Julie Gelfand described the country's lack of progress in reducing emissions as "disturbing" and noted that it was on track to miss its climate change targets.

A promised Just Transition Act has been repeatedly pushed back. This proposal was meant to assist the transformation of the Canadian economy and its workforce as the country moves to become carbon-neutral.

In July 2023, the Trudeau government outlined its plan to have net-zero electricity grids across Canada. The federal government conditionnent federal clean energy tax credits to provinces based on whether the provinces planned to create a net-zero electricity grid, something neither Alberta or Saskatchewan planned to do.

=== Carbon pricing ===
The Parliament of Canada passed the Greenhouse Gas Pollution Pricing Act (GHGPPA) in the fall of 2018 under Bill C-74. The GHGPPA refers to charge or pricing instead of taxation. The charge rose to $50 per tonne of CO_{2} in 2022, beginning at $20 in 2019 and increasing by $10 per year until 2022. Later that framework was updated to increase by $15 per year until 2030, reaching $170 per tonne of CO_{2}.

Through the GHGPPA, provinces have the flexibility to create their own solutions to deal with GHG emissions in their own jurisdictions. Through the GHGPPA all provinces are required to place a minimum price of $20 a tonne of GHG emissions by January 1, 2019. If their proposed system does not meet federal requirements or if the province or territory decides to not create their own system, the GHGPPA implements a regulatory fee. In provinces where a GHGPPA fee is levied, 90% of the revenues will be returned to tax-payers. The carbon price is part of the Federal government's commitments to the Paris Agreement.

=== Environmental impact assessment ===
Bill C-69 repealed and replaced the Canadian Environmental Assessment Act with the Impact Assessment Act. Bill C-69 also replaced the National Energy Board with the Canadian Energy Regulator (CER). This law required that major infrastructure projects, such as highways, mines, and pipelines, go through a more rigorous regulatory process which includes more public consultations, better consultations with First Nations, and taking into account other broad considerations such as climate change in the decision to go forward with a project or not.

The bill was heavily criticized by Conservatives and the Canadian Association of Petroleum Producers, who feared that the new regulations would stifle investments to natural resources extraction in Canada. Alberta Premier Jason Kenney dubbed it the "No pipeline bill". However, university professors Martin Olszynski and Mark S. Winfield believe these criticisms are overblown. Winfred points out that the pre-2019 regulatory framework is much weaker than the one that existed for 40 years in Canada before it was axed in 2012. C-69 brought back some of the consultation requirements from that period, but according to Winfield, "the legislation is a relatively minor adjustment to what already existed". In fact, Olszynski believes that this bill would make it easier for projects to go forward, as project critics would be included in the decision-making process, and thus less likely to resort to litigation to make their voices heard.

In May 2022, the Alberta Court of Appeal found that the Impact Assessment Act was unconstitutional on the ground that it overreached into matters of provincial and territorial jurisdiction. The federal government immediately appealed the decision.

=== Pipelines ===
The Trudeau government supports the construction of new oil and gas pipelines. The Trans Mountain expansion is under construction since 2018 and it is expected to be in service by 2024. The Canadian section of Line 3 and the northern section of Keystone XL were completed, despite the fact that the construction of the American section of Line 3 is in limbo, and that the Keystone XL Pipeline is cancelled.

In a 2017 opinion piece in The Guardian, Bill McKibben wrote that Trudeau was "hard at work pushing for new pipelines through Canada and the US to carry yet more oil out of Alberta’s tar sands, which is one of the greatest climate disasters on the planet." The provinces of Quebec and British Columbia have strongly opposed pipelines.

On August 31, 2018, the Government of Canada purchased the "entities that control the existing Trans Mountain Pipeline, its Expansion Project and related assets for $4.4 billion" which was financed through a loan to CDEV, "an enterprise Crown corporation." The Government of Canada does not intend "to be a long-term owner of the Trans Mountain entities." By May 29 when the purchase was announced it was met with a "storm of criticism" from environmental groups, Indigenous leaders and opposition politicians. The Green Party's Elizabeth May said it was an "historic blunder"; the president of the Union of B.C. Indian Chiefs was "shocked and appalled."

=== Marine protection ===
Bill C-55, a marine protection bill amended requirements under the Oceans Act regarding what constituted marine protected areas. The Liberals, the Green Party and the NDP approved the bill and the Conservative Party was opposed. Bill C-68 restored provisions in the Fisheries Act, which protects more thoroughly fish habitat that Stephen Harper's government had removed in the 2012 Bill C-38—Jobs, Growth and Long-term Prosperity Act. The new Canadian Navigable Waters Act changed what constitutes 'navigable water'.

=== Single use plastic ===
In October 2020, Trudeau's government announced it would ban six common single-use plastic items in Canada by the end of 2021. The list includes plastic grocery bags, straws, stir sticks, six-pack rings, cutlery and food containers made from hard-to-recycle plastics. Industry replaced the bags with reusable bags, paper straws, bamboo cutlery and modified containers, although other single-use plastics have not been addressed.

=== Home retrofit ===
In 2021, the Trudeau government launched the Canada Greener Homes Grant. The grant is destined for homeowners aiming to replace their fossil fuel burning mechanical systems with high efficiency electric based systems. This includes heat pumps (geothermal or air source), solar, heat pump water heaters, insulation, windows, air tightness, resiliency measures, and smart thermostats. Up to $5,600 per household can be claimed through this program.

== Immigration ==
In 2017, the Liberal government announced Canada would welcome nearly one million immigrants over the next three years. And indeed, Canada steadily increased the amount international migrants it took in every year of Trudeau's first term. After a steep drop during the COVID-19 pandemic, Canada welcomed a record of 657,883 immigrants in 2021–22. This record breaking immigration has been criticized for worsening Canada's housing crisis.

=== Refugees ===
The headlines made by the body of Alan Kurdi on a beach of Turkey in September 2015 made a significant turnover during the 2015 campaign. Then-candidate Trudeau made a plea that under his premiership, Canada would accept 25,000 refugees in Canada. One month after taking office, the first plane of refugees was landing at Pearson airport in Toronto. Trudeau and Ontario Premier Kathleen Wynne were there to welcome arriving refugees.

Trudeau has also advocated and supported open border immigration that starkly contrasts President Trump, publicly announcing "To those fleeing persecution, terror & war, Canadians will welcome you, regardless of your faith. Diversity is our strength #WelcomeToCanada", one day after Trump's executive order banning refugees and visitors from Muslim-majority countries Iran, Iraq, Libya, Somalia, Sudan, Syria and Yemen. In winter 2017, soon after President Trump took office in Washington, many Haitians who were in the United States due to the 2010 earthquake in Haiti decided to pass through the border in upstate New York to cross into Quebec. Afraid of being deported to Haiti, many decided to come illegally to Canada in hope of a better life. The RCMP, the Custom Agency and the Army set up a temporary camp in Lacolle, Quebec, in order to regulate the influx of people trying to come into Canada. As the Canadian government recognized the United States as a safe country for immigrants, they would not be taken as refugees if they arrived at a custom border from the United States. As a result, they needed to pass through illegally to be able to request refugee status. Both the Conservatives and NDP oppositions asked the government, both for different reasons, to stop the influx of Refugee claimants from Roxham Road in Lacolle.

Trudeau's government has also objected to the term "illegal border crossers". There has been an influx of overland illegal border crossings, and conflict between the federal government and the Ontario government over how to provide housing for the incoming migrants.

On March 24, 2023, Trudeau and U.S. President Joe Biden announced tougher deportation policies and an update to the Safe Third Country Agreement. Trudeau also announced the new policy would go into effect that midnight. Under the new agreement, Canada will be allowed to send migrants who cross at unofficial ports of entry at America's northern border back to the U.S., while the U.S. will also be able to turn back asylum seekers who travel across the border from Canada. In return, Trudeau agreed to allow only 15,000 more people from the Western Hemisphere to migrate to Canada legally. Despite this pledge to welcome more migrants, advocates criticized the deal, noting that it also limits the movement of asylum-seekers.

=== Quebec provincial powers ===
In 2022, Quebec Premier François Legault raised the idea of holding a referendum on the transfer of immigration powers from the federal government to the provincial government.

On March 15, 2024, Legault met with Trudeau to ask for total control over immigration powers, which Trudeau rejected. In response, the Parti Québécois leader, Paul St-Pierre Plamondon, reiterated his request for a referendum on the issue. A month later, Legault voiced similar views, threatening a referendum on the issue if Trudeau did not acquiesce.

== Relationship with Indigenous peoples ==
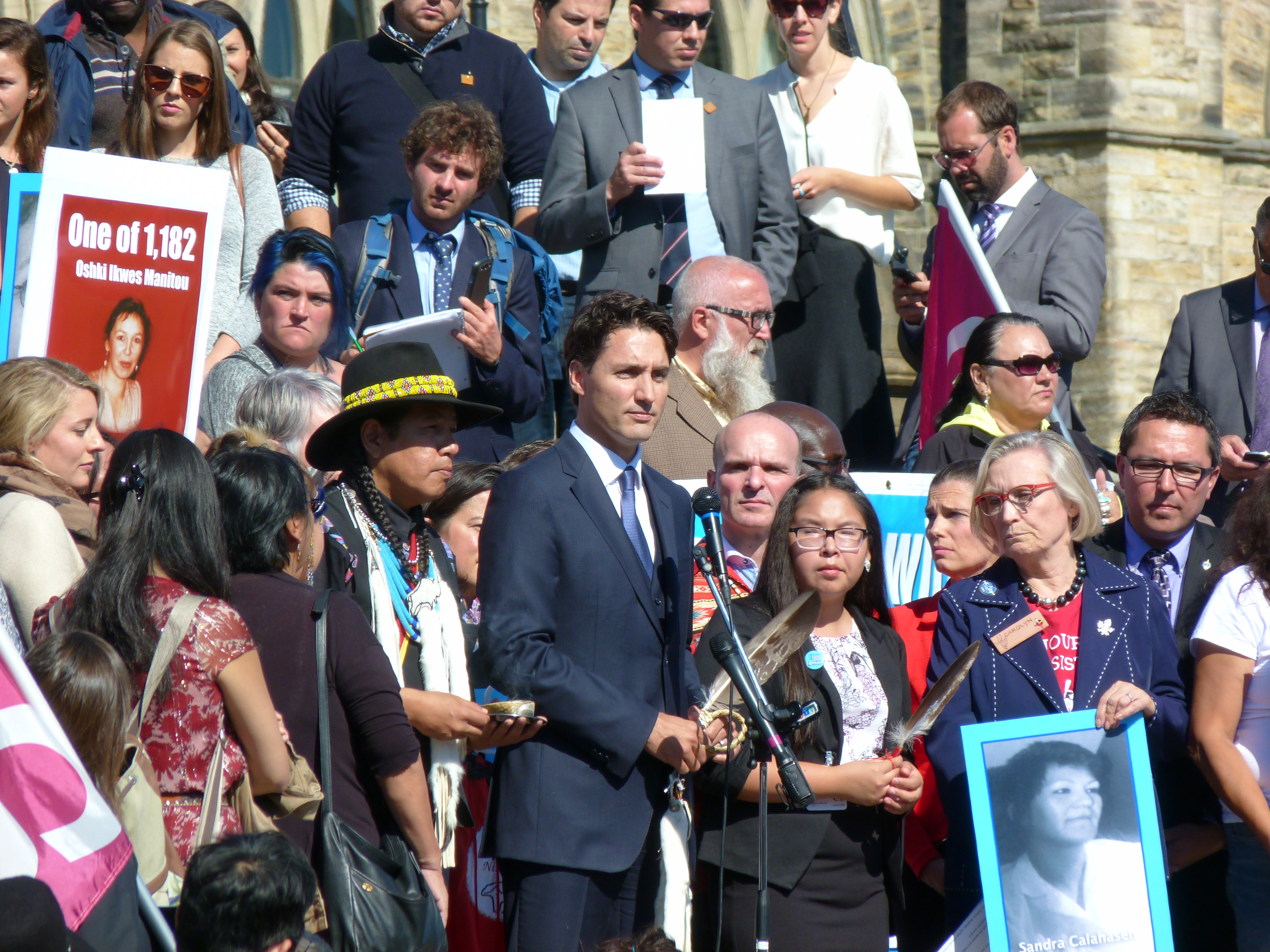
Trudeau giving a speech on the issue of missing and murdered Indigenous women, October 2016

Trudeau met with hundreds of chiefs at the Assembly of First Nations on December 7, 2015, and laid out his philosophy and commitments to Indigenous peoples in Canada, to assure their "constitutionally guaranteed rights ... a sacred obligation". In brief, he promised to rescind government policies that are in conflict with their rights, make a significant investment in education programs, increase general funding, and launch an enquiry into missing and murdered indigenous women. Trudeau also indicated that the new government would implement all of the recommendations made by the Truth and Reconciliation Commission.

Trudeau has previously said that he would respect a First Nations community's wishes regarding pipeline construction on their territory. Some First Nations leaders, including a councillor for the Squamish First Nation and prominent Mi’kmaw lawyer Pam Palmater have stated that they believe Trudeau's purchase of the Trans Mountain Pipeline violates this promise.

On January 18, 2024, the federal and territorial governments signed the Nunavut Lands and Resources Devolution Agreement; it gives the government of Nunavut control over the territory's land and resources. It is the largest land transfer in Canada's history.

=== Court struggles ===
While Trudeau has been prime minister, Crown–Indigenous Relations and Northern Affairs Canada (CIRNA) has settled and paid out CA$3.1 billion in claims against the Crown. Trudeau's government spent nearly CA$100 million fighting the First Nations in court during its first five years in power. As of December 2020, CIRNA was engaged in 366 active court cases against indigenous nations, and an additional 764 cases that were "essentially dormant". These cases represent CA$6.6 billion in contingent legal liabilities for the government. The figure rises to CA$22.4 billion when Indigenous land claims and specific claims are considered. This represents 85 percent of all the contingent liability of the whole Government.

One of the most publicized of such cases was Trudeau's push to invalidate two Canadian Human Rights Tribunal (CHRT) decisions in 2016. The CHRT had ruled that Canada's child welfare system was discriminatory to indigenous people. It forced the government to award CA$40,000 to some 50,000 children that were separated from their families. In June 2021, the House of Commons unanimously adopted a non-binding resolution urging the government to abandon this suit, but the Trudeau cabinet and a few backbench liberal MPs abstained from voting. On September 29, 2021, the Federal Court of Canada dismissed the government's suit and upheld the CHRT's 2016 rulings.

=== Issue of residential schools ===
Up until 1970, Canada removed 150,000 Canadian indigenous children from their parents and put them in residential schools run by the government or Christian churches with the goal of cultural assimilation. In June 2021, Pope Francis expressed sorrow at the news of mass graves that were found near residential schools and urged that this is a "strong call for all of us to turn away from the colonial model". Trudeau acknowledged that Canada committed cultural genocide against Indigenous people, but some of his political decisions have been seen as antagonistic to First Nations Canadians.

=== National Day for Truth and Reconciliation ===
In June 2021, the House of Commons elevated the Orange Shirt Day to a statutory holiday called the National Day for Truth and Reconciliation, first observed on September 21, 2021. Justin Trudeau had been invited to spend the day with the Tk’emlúps te Secwépemc nation, near the place the first Indian residential school unmarked graves were discovered earlier that year. Trudeau ignored the invitation, and his schedule showed him having meetings in Ottawa that day. However, Trudeau instead took an unannounced private holiday in Tofino, British Columbia.

=== Long-term drinking water advisories in First Nation communities ===
The Trudeau government promised to end all boil water advisories by March 2021, in May 2021 the federal government confirmed it would not meet its goal of ending all long-term drinking water advisories in First Nation reservations by March 2021. An action plan prepared by Indigenous Services Canada (ISC) in response to an auditor general report on access to safe drinking water in First Nation communities. Estimated that the federal government would not be able to eliminate all long-term drinking water advisories in First Nation communities until 2023-24 and that it would take until 2025–26 to ensure long-term solutions for a stable drinking water supply in some of the affected communities. The ISC will work with First Nations to implement projects that address the long-term water needs of all communities affected by long-term drinking water advisories since 2015 with an expected completion date of March 2026. As of March 21, 2022, the government has lifted 131 long-term drinking water advisories with 34 long-term drinking water advisories left in 29 communities.

== Event responses ==
=== COVID-19 pandemic response ===
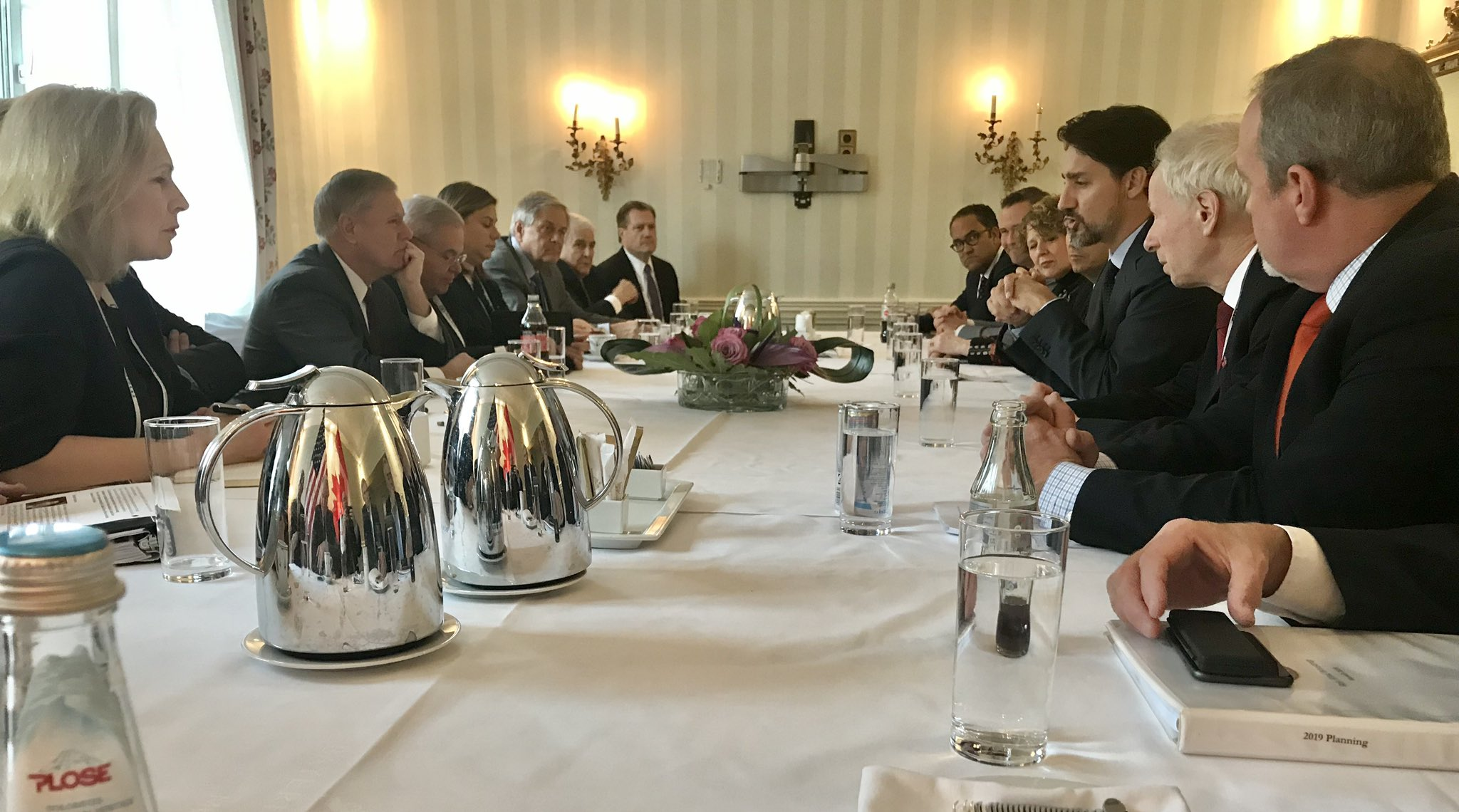
Trudeau at the 56th Munich Security Conference on February 17, 2020

Justin Trudeau was Prime Minister during the worldwide COVID-19 pandemic. His government's response to the pandemic included funds for provinces and territories to adapt to the new situation, funds for coronavirus research, travel restrictions, screening of international flights, self-isolation orders under the Quarantine Act, an industrial strategy, and a public health awareness campaign. Initially, Canada faced a shortage of personal protective equipment, as the Trudeau government had cut PPE stockpile funding in the previous years.

To deal with the economic impact of the pandemic in 2020, Trudeau waived student loan payments, increased the Canada Child Benefit, doubled the annual Goods and Services Tax payment, and introduced the Canada Emergency Response Benefit (CERB) as part of a first package in March. In April 2020, Trudeau introduced the Canada Emergency Wage Subsidy, the Canada Emergency Business Account, and the Canada Emergency Student Benefit. Trudeau also deployed the Canadian Forces in long-term care homes in Quebec and Ontario as part of Operation LASER.

Throughout the pandemic, the federal government was also responsible for the procurement of COVID-19 vaccines. On May 12, 2020, the Trudeau government announced it had reached an exclusive deal with CanSino Biologics. However, due to deteriorating Canadian-Chinese relations, the Cansino deal fell through. On August 5, 2020, the Trudeau government created a plan to secure doses of the Pfizer and Moderna vaccines. Starting in December 2020, Justin trudeau oversaw the implementation of Canada's mass-vaccination program.

Canada's mass COVID-19 vaccination campaign started on December 14, 2020. Canada had ordered more vaccines per capita than any country in the world; around 4 vaccine per Canadians. However, the various companies producing them did not follow through, and by April 2021, only 2% of the country was inoculated. Canada doesn't have a domestic vaccine production facility since the privatization of the Connaught Laboratories in the 1980s, and the Trudeau government did not invest in building back this production capacity until 2021. As such, Canada's vaccines rollout was slowed down by companies not delivering the planned amount of vaccines, and countries such as India blocking vaccine exports. Vaccination had to be paused in many parts of Canada due to vaccine shortages.

The spread of COVID-19 in Canada continued beyond the initial outbreak, with a strong second wave in the fall of 2020 and an even more serious third wave in the spring of 2021. Throughout the crisis, Trudeau periodically extended the scope and duration of the federal aid programs. The 2021 Canadian federal budget planned to phase them out by the end of September 2021, and projected a $354.2-billion deficit in the 2020–21 fiscal year. While CERB was indeed phased out on September 26, the Canada Recovery Benefit (CBR) continued to provide support until October 23. The Canada Worker Lockdown Benefit was introduced that month to replace the CBR, and expanded during the spread of the Omicron variant in December 2021.

=== Quebec City mosque attack ===
On the night of January 29, 2017, Alexandre Bissonnette, a young Quebec City citizen, opened fire in a mosque in the Sainte-Foy neighbourhood of Quebec City. Six people were killed and 19 others were seriously injured. The Prime Minister said in the House of Commons, "This was a group of innocents targeted for practicing their faith. Make no mistake, this was a terrorist act". Following the massacre Trudeau attended and gave a speech at religious ceremonies with Premier of Québec Philippe Couillard. Trudeau has also criticized the far-right group La Meute, condemning them as "racists" and "...'nonos' who wear dog paws on their T-shirts".

=== 2020 gas pipeline and railway protests ===
There was a series of civil disobedience protests held in Canada in protest of the construction of the Coastal GasLink Pipeline (CGL) through 190 kilometres (120 mi) of Wetʼsuwetʼen First Nation territory in British Columbia (BC), land that is unceded. Other concerns of the protesters were indigenous land rights, the actions of police, land conservation, and the environmental impact of energy projects. Access to the Coastal GasLink Pipeline construction camps in Wetʼsuwetʼen territory was blocked by protesters and the Coastal GasLink project was granted an injunction in 2018 to remove the land defenders. In January 2019, the Royal Canadian Mounted Police (RCMP) of British Columbia removed the blockades and CGL pre-construction work in the territory was completed. Subsequently, the blockades were rebuilt and Coastal GasLink was granted a second injunction by the Supreme Court of British Columbia in December 2019 to allow construction.

In February 2020, after the RCMP enforced the second court injunction, removing the Wetʼsuwetʼen blockades and arresting Wetʼsuwetʼen land defenders, solidarity protests sprang up across Canada. Many were rail blockades, including one blockade near Tyendinaga Mohawk Territory which halted traffic along a major Canadian National Railway line between Toronto and Montreal and led to a shutdown of passenger rail service and rail freight operations in much of Canada. The Eastern Ontario blockade was itself removed by the Ontario Provincial Police. Blockades and protests continued through March in BC, Ontario and Quebec. Discussions between representatives of the Wetʼsuwetʼen and the governments of Canada and British Columbia has led to a provisional agreement on the Wetʼsuwetʼen land rights in the area.

==== Federal government response ====
Prime Minister Justin Trudeau said politicians should not be telling the police how to deal with protesters and that resolution should come through dialogue. The Canadian government does not tell the police what to do operationally. In any case, the police services are under provincial or municipal control.

On February 12, Canada's Indigenous Services Minister Marc Miller began a dialogue with several indigenous leaders from different parts of Canada. On February 15, Miller met the Mohawks in a ceremonial encounter on the CNR train tracks to renew a 17th-century treaty between the Iroquois and the British Crown known as the Silver Covenant Chain. Miller then discussed the blockade with the leaders of Mohawks of the Bay of Quinte First Nation, along with Kanenhariyo, one of the primary organizers of the protest near Tyendinaga. Miller asked for a temporary drawback of the protest but his request was refused after Wetʼsuwetʼen hereditary Chief Woos, who was on the phone, stated that the RCMP was still on his territory and "they are out there with guns, threatening us". Leaked audio of the meetings included a Mohawk resident in the meeting telling the minister to "Get the red coats out first, get the blue coats out ... then we can maybe have some common discussions". Miller returned to Ottawa and met with Prime Minister Trudeau and other members of the Cabinet called the "Incident Response Group". Trudeau had returned from a foreign relations trip to deal with the issue.

On February 18, the House of Commons of Canada resumed after the winter break. Trudeau addressed the Commons asking Canadians for patience as the government sought a negotiated end. "On all sides, people are upset and frustrated. I get it. It's understandable because this is about things that matter—rights and livelihoods, the rule of law and our democracy." Opposition leader Andrew Scheer condemned the government's refusal to use the police to stop the illegal blockades, calling it "the weakest response to a national crisis in Canadian history. Will our country be one of the rule of the law, or will our country be one of the rule of the mob?" Trudeau held a private meeting with the other opposition parties' leaders, barring Scheer after his comments.

On February 18, the Assembly of First Nations (AFN) held a press conference in Ottawa. AFN National Chief Perry Bellegarde called for all parties to engage in dialogue. "It's on everybody. It's not on any one individual. I'm just calling on all the parties to come together, get this dialogue started in a constructive way."

On February 20, according to a statement from Canadian Public Safety Minister Bill Blair, the RCMP agreed to move its personnel from Wetʼsuwetʼen territory to nearby Houston. The next day, Prime Minister Trudeau held a press conference to state "Canadians have been patient. Our government has been patient, but it has been two weeks and the barricades need to come down now. The government had made repeated overtures to the hereditary chiefs to hold meetings but had been ignored. You can't have dialogue when only one party is coming to the table. Our hand remains extended should someone want to reach for it. We have come to a moment where the onus is now on Indigenous leadership."

Shortly after Trudeau's statement on February 21, the Wetʼsuwetʼen hereditary chiefs released a statement reaffirming that discussions would continue once all RCMP and CGL personnel vacate the Wetʼsuwetʼen territory. At the same time, the Mohawk of Tyendinaga asserted that their rail blockade would be removed as soon as Wetʼsuwetʼen legal observers confirm that the RCMP is off their land. On February 24, the day of the Mohawk blockade removal by the OPP, Indigenous Services Minister Miller repeated that the Liberal government was "still open for dialogue" and willing to negotiate.

On February 24, in a statement signed and supported by over 200 Canadian lawyers and legal scholars, Beverly Jacobs and Sylvia McAdam of the University of Windsor, Alex Neve of Amnesty International, and Harsha Walia of the BC Civil Liberties Association responded to the calls for the "rule of law". In their opinion, it is the Canadian federal and provincial governments that are breaking international law, not the Wetʼsuwetʼen hereditary chiefs. They also pointed out that the requirements laid out in the UN Declaration on the Rights of Indigenous Peoples have continued to be ignored by Canadian courts, although Canadian governments have expressed a willingness to follow the UN resolution. They called for an end to the violation of indigenous persons' right to free, prior and informed consent.

In early May, the elected chiefs of several Wetʼsuwetʼen band councils (primarily Nee-Tahi-Buhn, Skin Tyee, Tsʼil Kaz Koh, and Wetʼsuwetʼen First Nations) called on Minister Bennett to resign, as the Canadian and BC governments, along with the hereditary chiefs, pressed forward with the memorandum of understanding. In a statement on May 11, before the signing of the memorandum, the elected chiefs called on Minister Bennett to resign due to her "disregard for [their] special relationship". They repeated this demand in a statement on May 14, after the signing of the MOU, and added a call for Minister Marc Miller to speak up about his "intention to protect the programs and services the Wetʼsuwetʼen people depend on".

On October 2, CBC News reported that information related to protests in February that they had requested from the Canadian Security Intelligence Service (CSIS) under the Access to Information Act had been withheld. CSIS cited section 15 of the act in withholding the information, which defines "subversive or hostile activities" as including sabotage, terrorism, actions directed at a "government change", activities that "threaten" Canadians or federal employees, and espionage.

Documents obtained by CBC News in 2019 found that in the two years of their near constant presence on the Morice Forest Service Road, the RCMP had spent over $13 million on policing. Chief Naʼmoks compared that very high level of spending with the perceived inaction by the RCMP over violent attacks and harassment of Mi'kmaw fishers in Nova Scotia.

=== Afghanistan evacuation efforts ===
After the 2021 Taliban offensive in Afghanistan and the Fall of Kabul, Trudeau received criticism for not acting fast enough to evacuate Afghans who supported Canada's military and diplomatic efforts. Beginning on August 4, Operation AEGIS the CAF was directed by the Government of Canada to start transporting evacuees out of Afghanistan. The Trudeau government advised Canadian citizens, interpreters who worked with the Canadian Armed Forces, and refugee claimants, to wear red and shout "Canada" in order to get through checkpoints. However, as these checkpoints were being manned by United States Armed Forces and British Armed Forces troops, and not Canadian troops, many evacuees were unable to get by. Global News reported that Royal Canadian Air Force crews were limited in the numbers they could transport by available seatbelts on the C-17s Hercules, with seating up to 188 people. By late August 2021, Canada began sending special forces outside of the airport security zone to shepherd evacuees. Canada identified 6,000 Afghans for evacuation. In the end, 3,700 people, including both Canadian nationals and Afghans, were airlifted out.

== Electoral reform proposal ==
During the campaign prior to the 2015 federal election, Trudeau promised to eliminate the current voting system by the next federal election. Called "first-past-the-post" or "single-member plurality", this system awards the House of Commons seat in any electoral district to the candidate who received the most votes in that electoral riding, and the party with the most seats forms the government. Consequently, it is possible for a political party to form a majority government with around 40 per cent of the popular vote across Canada.

Trudeau has said that he advocates a system where the distribution of seats is more in line with the popular vote on a Canada-wide basis, to be achieved by a new type of ballot that allows voters to rank the candidates in order of preference. However, Trudeau has said that he is open to proportional representation, which is more likely to produce coalition governments.

In December 2015, the government announced that an all-party parliamentary committee would be formed in early 2016 to consider other options. During a discussion of the plan, Minister of Democratic Institutions Maryam Monsef referred to it as "an open and robust process of consultation". However, she refused to commit to the Conservative Party's demand for a public referendum that would allow Canadians to vote on their preferred electoral system, indicating that she does not want to "prejudice the outcome of that consultation process".

There was some controversy regarding the government's initial plans for the Special Committee on Electoral Reform, as the Liberals announced that they would have a majority of the committee's ten seats. Trudeau and Monsef subsequently altered their plans, ceding a majority of the seats to the opposition. Trudeau acknowledged the opposition's concerns that "we were perhaps behaving in a way that was resembling more the previous government than the kind of approach and tone that we promised throughout the electoral campaign", and stated they changed course to show otherwise.

On February 1, 2017, the newly appointed Minister of Democratic Institutions Karina Gould announced that the government had abandoned the electoral reform project and it was no longer a priority in her mandate letter from Trudeau. In the letter, Trudeau wrote that "a clear preference for a new electoral system, let alone a consensus, has not emerged" and that "without a clear preference or a clear question, a referendum would not be in Canada's interest".

On February 10, 2017, at a townhall in Yellowknife, Trudeau admitted he had "turned his back" on the promise to reform the electoral system.

== Senate nominations reform ==
Trudeau has long advocated changes that would make the Senate of Canada a less partisan house. In January 2014, he announced a step that began reducing Senate partisanship by removing Liberal senators from the Liberal caucus.

On December 5, 2015, after his appointment as prime minister, the new government's democratic institutions minister, Maryam Monsef, with House leader Dominic LeBlanc, announced a major overhaul of the appointment process, as Trudeau had promised during the election campaign. The new system consists of five board members—three federal appointees and two from the relevant province—who will pick independent candidates, not officially affiliated with any political party, based on merit, a similar concept to the Advisory Committee on Vice-Regal Appointments.

The stated goal of the December 2015 reform, was to improve the effectiveness of the Senate which had been, according to Monsef, "hampered by its reputation as a partisan institution". She indicated that this reform would not require an amendment to the constitution. The advisory board was expected to have been appointed by the end of December 2015. The criteria for appointment to the Senate would be "outstanding personal qualities that include integrity and ethics and experience in public life, community service or leadership in their field of expertise". At the time of the announcement, there were 17 Senate vacancies and these were expected to be filled by the end of 2016.

== Phoenix pay system ==
The Office of the Auditor General (OAG) conducted two reports, one if 2017 and another in 2018 reviewing the Phoenix Pay System—a payroll processing system for Canadian federal government employees that is run by Public Services and Procurement Canada (PSPC) which has been controversial for a number of years— The 2018 report said that the Phoenix system was an "'incomprehensible failure' of project management and oversight." Then-Prime Minister Stephen Harper had introduced the system as part of his 2009 Transformation of Pay Administration Initiative, to replace Canada's 40-year old system with a new improved, cost-saving "automated, off-the-shelf commercial system." By 2018, Phoenix had caused pay problems to over 50 per cent of the federal government's 290,000 public servants through underpayments, over-payments, and non-payments. In the same year, the Senator Percy Mockler's Standing Senate Committee on National Finance report on Phoenix Pay Problem called Phoenix an "international embarrassment" and that fixing Phoenix's problems could be up to CA$2.2 billion by 2023 instead of saving $70 million a year as originally planned by the Harper government. In May 2019, the Parliamentary Budget Officer (PBO) predicted that the Phoenix replacement—which will save millions—will not be operational until 2023.
