= National Business Book Award =

Canadian non-fiction literary award

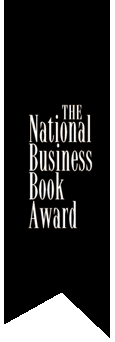
- Date: 1985–present
- Location: Toronto, Ontario
- Country: Canada
- Presented by: Bennett Jones; The Globe and Mail; The Walrus
- Reward: 30,000 C$
- Currently held by: Chris Clearfield and András Tilcsik
- Website: www.nbbaward.com

The National Business Book Award is an award presented to Canadian business authors. The award, presented every year since 1985, is sponsored by Presenting Partner Smith Financial Corporation, Supported by BMO Canada, RBC Royal Bank, Media Partners The Globe and Mail, and The Walrus, with prize management by Freedman & Associates.

Among the jury members is jury chair and business journalist Deirdre McMurdy. Also on the jury are author and publisher Anna Porter; professor and management consultant Bobby Siu; CEO of the Black North Initiative Dahabo Ahmed-Omer; former Governor of the Bank of Canada Stephen Poloz; and Pamela Wallin, a Conservative sitting in the Senate of Canada.

== Winners ==
- 2025: Posadzki, Alexandra. Rogers v. Rogers: The Battle for Control of Canada's Telecom Empire. McClelland & Stewart
- 2024: Poloz, Stephen. The Next Age of Uncertanity: How The World Can Adapt to a Riskier Future. Penguin Canada
- 2022: Miron, Adam; St-Louis, Sébastien; Beun, Julie. Billion Dollar Start-Up: The True Story of How a Couple of 29-Year-Olds Turned $35,000 into a $1,000,000 Cannabis Company. Toronto: ECW Press. ISBN 978-1-77041-586-7.
- 2021: shared award, Steven R. Bown, "The Company: The Rise and Fall of the Hudson's Bay Empire," and Mark Carney, "Values"
- 2019: Chris Clearfield and András Tilcsik, Meltdown: Why Our Systems Fail and What We Can Do About It (Allen Lane, imprint of Penguin Random House, 2018)
- 2018: Chris Turner, The Patch: The People, Pipelines and Politics of the Oil Sands (Simon & Schuster, 2017)
- 2017: Daniel J. Levitin, A Field Guide to Lies: Critical Thinking in the Information Age (Allen Lane, imprint of Penguin Random House, 2016, ISBN 06700-6994-9)
- 2016: Jacquie McNish and Sean Silcoff, Losing the Signal: The Spectacular Rise and Fall of Blackberry (HarperCollins Publishers, 2015, ISBN 14434-3618-6)
- 2015: Alfred Hermida, Tell Everyone: Why We Share and Why it Matters (Doubleday Canada, imprint of Penguin Random House, 2014, ISBN 03856-7956-4)
- 2014: Jim Leech and Jacquie McNish, The Third Rail: Confronting Our Pension Failures (Signal, imprint of McLelland & Stewart, 2013, ISBN 07710-4735-5)
- 2013: Chrystia Freeland, Plutocrats: The Rise of the New Global Super-Rich and the Fall of Everyone Else (Doubleday Canada, 2012, ISBN 1-5942-0409-8)
- 2012 : Bruce Philp, Consumer Republic: Using Brands to Get What You Want, Make Corporations Behave, and Maybe Even Save the World (McLelland & Stewart, 2011, ISBN 0-7710-7002-0)
- 2011 : Ezra Levant, Ethical Oil: The Case for Canada's Oil Sands (McLelland & Stewart, 2010, ISBN 0-7710-4641-3)
- 2010 : Jeff Rubin, Why Your World Is About to Get a Whole Lot Smaller: Oil and the End of Globalization (Random House, 2009, ISBN 1-4000-6850-9)
- 2009 : Gordon Pitts, Stampede! The Rise of the West and Canada's New Power Elite (Key Porter Books, 2008, ISBN 1-55470-120-1)
- 2008 : William Marsden, Stupid to the Last Drop: How Alberta Is Bringing Environmental Armageddon to Canada (And Doesn't Seem to Care) (Knopf Canada, 2007, ISBN 0-676-97913-0)
- 2007 : Thomas Homer-Dixon, The Upside of Down: Catastrophe, Creativity, and the Renewal of Civilization (Island Press, 2006, ISBN 1-59726-064-9)
- 2006 : Matt Bellamy, Profiting the Crown: Canada's Polymer Corporation, 1942-1990 (McGill-Queen's University Press, 2004, ISBN 0-7735-2815-6)
- 2005 : Jacquie McNish and Sinclair Stewart, Wrong Way: The Fall of Conrad Black (Overlook Hardcover, 2004, ISBN 1-58567-636-5)
- 2004 : Kim Vicente, The Human Factor: Revolutionizing the Way People Live With Technology (Routledge, 2004, ISBN 0-415-97891-2)
- 2003 : Douglas Hunter, The Bubble and The Bear: How Nortel Burst the Canadian Dream (Doubleday Canada, 2002, ISBN 0-385-65918-0)
- 2002 : John Lawrence Reynolds, Free Rider (McArthur & Company Publishing, 2001, ISBN 1-55278-235-2)
- 2001 : Naomi Klein, No Logo: Taking Aim at the Brand Bullies (Knopf Canada, 2000, ISBN 0-312-20343-8)
- 2000 : Ingeborg Boyens, Unnatural Harvest: How Genetic Engineering is Altering Our Food (Doubleday Canada, 2000, ISBN 0-385-25789-9)
- 1999 : Jennifer Wells, Fever: The Dark Mystery of the Bre-X Gold Rush (Viking, 1998, ISBN 0-670-87815-4)
- 1998 : Anthony Bianco, The Reichmanns - Family, Faith, Fortune, and the Empire of Olympia and York (Random House, 1998, ISBN 0-8129-3063-0)
- 1997 : Rod McQueen, Who Killed Confederation Life?: The Inside Story (McClelland & Stewart, 1996, ISBN 0-7710-5631-1)
- 1996 : Heather Robertson, Driving Force: The McLaughlin Family and the Age of the Car (McClelland & Stewart, 1995, ISBN 0-7710-7556-1)
- 1995 : Anne Kingston, The Edible Man: Dave Nichol, President's Choice and the Making of Popular Taste (Macfarlane Walter & Ross, 1995, ISBN 0-921912-94-3)
- 1994 : Duncan McDowall, Quick to the Frontier: Canada's Royal Bank (McClelland & Stewart, 1993, ISBN 0-7710-5504-8)
- 1993 : Peter Foster, Self-Serve: How Petro-Canada Pumped Canadians Dry (Macfarlane Walter & Ross, 1992, ISBN 0-921912-38-2)
- 1992 : G. Bruce Doern and Brian W. Tomlin, Faith and Fear: The Free Trade Story (Stoddart, 1991, ISBN 0-7737-2534-2)
- 1991 : Ann Gibbon and Peter Hadekel, Steinberg: The Breakup of a Family Empire (Macmillan of Canada, 1990, ISBN 0-7715-9102-0)
- 1990 : Ian Brown, Freewheeling: the Feuds, Broods, and Outrageous Fortunes of the Billes Family and Canada's Favorite Company (HarperCollins Canada, 1989, ISBN 0-00-215977-5)
- 1989 : Greig Steward, Shutting Down the National Dream (McGraw-Hill Ryerson, 1988, ISBN 0-07-549675-5
- 1988 : Michael Bliss, Northern Enterprise: Five Centuries of Canadian Business (McClelland & Stewart, 1990, ISBN 0-7710-1569-0)
- 1987 : Philip Smith, Harvest from the Rock: A History of Mining in Ontario (Macmillan of Canada, 1986, ISBN 0-7715-9705-3)
- 1986 : Ann Shortell and Patricia Best, A Matter of Trust (Penguin Books, 1986, ISBN 0-14-007721-9)
