= Plutonomy =

Science of production and distribution of wealth

Plutonomy (from Ancient Greek πλοῦτος (ploûtos) 'wealth' and νόμος (nómos) 'law'; a portmanteau of plutocracy and economy) is the science of production and distribution of wealth.

== Origins ==
Plutonomy entered the language as late as the 1850s in the work of John Malcolm Forbes Ludlow. John Ruskin is quoted as having referred to plutonomy as a "base or bastard science".

Citigroup analysts have also used the word plutonomy to describe economies "where economic growth is powered by and largely consumed by the wealthy few." In three reports for super-rich Citigroup clients published in 2005 and 2006, a team of Citigroup analysts elaborated on their thesis that the share of the very rich in national income of plutonomies had become so large that what is going on in these economies and in their relation with other economies cannot be properly understood any more with reference to the average consumer: "The rich are so rich that their behavior – be it negative savings, or just very low consumption of oil as a % of their income – overwhelms that of the 'average' consumer."

The authors of these studies predicted that the global trend toward plutonomies would continue, for various reasons, including "capitalist-friendly governments and tax regimes". They do, however, also warn of the risk that, since "political enfranchisement remains as was – one person, one vote, at some point it is likely that labor will fight back against the rising profit share of the rich and there will be a political backlash against the rising wealth of the rich."

In their study "Piketty and Plutonomy: The Revenge of Inequality" they state that in the long term the drivers of the further concentration of wealth are intact, including globalization and capitalism-friendly governments. However, they warn that in the short-term there is potential for a backlash. One reason is that the US central bank Federal Reserve is reducing their asset purchases. According to Kapur and team, "the balance sheets of the plutonomists have been an important transmission channel of monetary policy." They further see the luxury industry catering to plutonomists threatened by anti-corruption initiatives of China and India. Firms like Rémy Cointreau are already suffering from this, they write.
