= Peter Lindert =

Peter Lindert is a well known American economic historian. He is an emeritus professor at the University of California, Davis and is well known for his work on trends in inequality trends, social spending, redistribution and the welfare state.

== Academic service ==
- Has served as President of the Economic History Association

== Selected publications ==
- Milanovic, B., Lindert, P. H., & Williamson, J. G. (2011). Pre‐industrial inequality. The economic journal, 121(551), 255-272.
- Lindert, P. H. (2004). Growing public: Volume 1, the story: Social spending and economic growth since the eighteenth century (Vol. 1). Cambridge University Press.
- Lindert, P. H., & Williamson, J. G. (2016). Unequal gains: American growth and Inequality since 1700.
- Lindert, P. H. (2021). Making social spending work. Cambridge University Press.

== Homepage ==
https://phlindert.faculty.ucdavis.edu/
