= 2021 Canadian federal budget =

2021 budget of the Canadian federal government
- Presented: 19 April 2021
- Country: Canada
- Parliament: 43rd
- Party: Liberal
- Finance minister: Chrystia Freeland
- Total revenue: $296.2 billion (projected for 2020), $355.1 billion (projected for 2021) $316.4 billion (Actual for 2020), $413.3 billion (Actual for 2021)
- Total expenditures: $650.3 billion (projected for 2020, including net actuarial losses), $509.8 billion (projected for 2021, including net actuarial losses) $644.2 billion (Actual for 2020), $503.5 billion (Actual for 2021)
- Deficit: $354.2 billion (projected for 2020), $154.7 billion (projected for 2021) $327.7 billion (Actual for 2020), $90.2 billion (Actual for 2021)
- Website: https://www.budget.gc.ca/2021/pdf/budget-2021-en.pdf

The Canadian federal budget for the fiscal years of 2020–21 and 2021–22 was presented to the House of Commons by finance minister Chrystia Freeland on 19 April 2021. The Canadian government did not produce a budget in 2020 due to the COVID-19 pandemic. Instead, the government produced a series of economic updates and stimulus plans throughout the year.

== Background ==
A Canadian federal budget for fiscal year 2020–21 was initially supposed to be presented to the House of Commons by Finance Minister Bill Morneau on 30 March 2020. However, this was delayed due to the COVID-19 outbreak in Canada.

On 17 June 2020, Justin Trudeau announced that the finance minister would table a fiscal and economic snapshot on 8 July 2020. This document was shorter than a budget or even a regular Fall Economic Statement as it did not incorporate medium or long-term projections. Conservative and Bloc oppositions criticized the government for lack of transparency and asked for a more comprehensive document to be tabled.

On 30 November 2020, newly appointed finance minister Chrystia Freeland presented a federal fiscal update to the House of Commons. The document called for increased spending to child benefits and to the wage subsidy. The update extended multiple federal COVID response aid programs to March or June 2021. The update also included industry-specific aid packages for economic sectors hard-hit by the pandemic, notably for the airline industry.

On 23 March 2021, Freeland announced during question period that the budget for 2021 would be tabled on 19 April.

== Measures ==
The budget announced the creation of a national child care plan. The $30 billion proposal plans to reduce kindergarten prices by 50 percent in 2022, and to reduce their prices to $10 per day by 2026.

The budget included a host of new targeted taxes, including taxes on luxury cars, jets or boats, a 1% tax on vacant homes owned by non-citizens, and a tax on digital services (dubbed the "Netflix tax"). The budget also created a tax on vaping products, and increased the tax on cigarettes.

Canada's federal deficit for the fiscal year 2020–21 is expected to be $354.2 billion.

== Legislative history ==
The first implementation bill of the 2021 budget was definitely adopted on 23 June 2021 with support from the Liberals, New Democrats (except Scott Duvall, MP for Hamilton Mountain who voted against), Bloc Québécois and Green MPs. All Conservative MPs present in the House voted against the bill.

House of Commons vote on the Budget Implementation Act, 2021, No. 1
| Party | Yea | Nay | Abstention | Absent |
|---|---|---|---|---|
| Liberals | 152 | 0 | 0 | 3 |
| Conservatives | 0 | 118 | 0 | 1 |
| Bloc Québécois | 32 | 0 | 0 | 0 |
| New Democratic | 22 | 1 | 0 | 1 |
| Green | 2 | 0 | 0 | 0 |
| Independents | 3 | 2 | 0 | 0 |
| Total | 211 | 121 | 0 | 5 |
