= Plutocrats (book) =

2012 non-fiction book by Chrystia Freeland

Plutocrats: The Rise of the New Global Super Rich and the Fall of Everyone Else
- First edition (UK)
- Author: Chrystia Freeland
- Language: English
- Publisher: Allen Lane (UK); Penguin Books (US)
- Publication date: October 1, 2012
- Awards: Lionel Gelber Prize (2013); National Business Book Award (2013)
- ISBN: 9781846142529
- OCLC: 780480424
- Dewey Decimal: 305.5/234
- LC Class: HB251 .F74 2012

Plutocrats: The Rise of the New Global Super Rich and the Fall of Everyone Else is a book about economic inequality by Chrystia Freeland, first published in 2012. In 2013, it won the Lionel Gelber Prize and the National Business Book Award.

== Content ==
Plutocrats discusses the lives of ultra high net-worth individuals. The book divides the very wealthy into three main groups—Russian oligarchs, Wall Street financial professionals, and American business executives—and devotes considerable attention to how the third group got so rich. It argues that the very rich are often products of fortuitous circumstances, but nonetheless take themselves to deserve their wealth because contemporary plutocrats tend to earn money by working; however, the book does not reach a position one way or another about whether contemporary wealth is meritocratic, nor does it investigate inherited wealth.

== Reception ==
A review in The Guardian, while generally praising Plutocrats, noted that it was "short of solutions" to the problems it identifies. According to Anthony Gould, Plutocrats argues that the American Dream is "apparently over", because American society no longer rewards entrepreneurs who produce useful or valuable goods and instead favours financial chicanery as a way to get rich.

Justin Trudeau reportedly met Freeland for the first time at a book signing for Plutocrats in Toronto. The book convinced Trudeau to ask Freeland to join the Liberal Party as a candidate. Trudeau subsequently became Prime Minister and appointed Freeland to his cabinet, initially as Minister of International Trade and eventually Deputy Prime Minister and Minister of Finance.
