= Ruby K. Payne =

American educator and author

Ruby K. Payne is an American educator and author best known for her 1995 book A Framework for Understanding Poverty and her work on the culture of poverty and its relation to education. Payne received an undergraduate degree from Goshen College in 1972. She holds a Ph.D. in educational leadership and policy studies from Loyola University in Illinois, and is the founder of aha! Process, Inc., a company that informs schools, companies and other organizations about poverty.

== A Framework for Understanding Poverty ==
Payne's book, which has sold over one million copies, deals heavily with the concept of "hidden rules," characteristics that a member of one of the three main social classes (upper, middle and lower) supposedly possesses which makes communicating and relating to members of the other classes difficult. Payne supports the standardized testing methods of the 2001 No Child Left Behind Act.

== Criticism ==
Payne's work is controversial, particularly among academics, who take issue with what has been characterized as her lack of data and reliance on anecdotal evidence for her claims, her stereotyping of poor people, her failure to recognize the role of the societal and structural systems in perpetuating the cycle of poverty, and with the almost complete lack of discussion concerning race and racial discrimination in her books.

Paul Gorski, assistant professor at New Century College at George Mason University, is openly critical of Payne's work, and has stated that her premises are based on stereotypes and her of classism and racism.

In a 2005 essay titled "Savage Unrealities: Uncovering Classism in Ruby Payne’s Framework", Gorski wrote that Payne fails to provide any analysis of the structural or institutional causes of poverty, and that her work is characterized by "a reliance on the deficit perspective, which problematizes people in poverty instead of problematizing the ways in which classism is cycled in schools and the larger society." He also notes that Payne argues that poverty is a "choice", putting the blame on poor people for their own situation, while identifying the symptoms of poverty as its causes: "This, interestingly, is the same sort of cause-and-effect reversal evident throughout President Bush's No Child Left Behind (NCLB) act. This federal legislation seems to blame schools—particularly those with high-poverty populations—for underachievement while failing to name or address the inequitable access that underlies the achievement gap. [...] This conservative reframing allows Payne to build a framework for understanding poverty that cleverly, appallingly, avoids larger questions about class privilege (of which Payne is a beneficiary) and the current wave of regressive education policy (like NCLB) that cycles it. [...] And it allows her to avoid the classist reality that this is happening, not in a society that lacks the resources to change these conditions, but one in which we can but continually fail to do so."

Gorski also believed the educational field accepted Payne's ideas too readily, without the proper critical analysis, noting that Payne's work was self-published and had not undergone the rigorous peer-review process usually required of professional academics. He wrote that the reason for this acceptance could potentially be attributed to the "temptation of the path of least resistance", as Payne's work reinforces common classist biases and does not force the reader to confront their own privileges.

These criticisms from Gorski, in combination with a similarly critical 2006 article by Jennifer C. Ng and John L. Rury, etwo ducation professors at the University of Kansas, entitled "Poverty and Education: A Critical Analysis of the Ruby Payne Phenomenon", began a heated debate between Payne and her supporters, and her critics in the mainstream academic community. Payne threatened a copyright lawsuit against Gorski. A more extensive article critical of Payne's work was published by Randy Bomer, Joel E. Dworin, Laura May, and Peggy Semingson of the University of Texas in 2008, also in Teachers College Record, with a response from Payne and a rejoinder from the authors. Ng and Rury also published a critical article in the online Journal of Educational Controversy in 2009.

== Books ==
- A Framework for Understanding Poverty. Baytown, TX: RFT, 1995
- A Framework for Understanding Poverty Workbook. Baytown, TX: RFT, 1998
- Learning Structures. Baytown, TX: RFT, 1998
- Think Rather of Zebra: Dealing with Aspects of Poverty Through Story, with Jay Stailey. Baytown, TX: RFT, 1998
- Bridges out of Poverty: Strategies for Professionals and Communities, with Philip DeVol and Terie Dreussi-Smith. Baytown, TX: RFT, 1999
- Removing the Mask: Giftedness in Poverty, with Paul Slocumb. Baytown, TX: RFT, 1999
- What Every Church Member Should Know About Poverty, with Bill Ehlig. Baytown, TX: RFT, 1999
- Boys in Poverty: A Framework for Understanding Dropout, with Paul Slocumb. Bloomington, IN: Solution Tree, 2010
- Achievement for All: Keys to Educating Middle Grades Students in Poverty. Westerville, OH: Association for Middle Level Educators (2013)

== See also ==
- Attributions for poverty
- Culture of poverty
- Cycle of poverty
- Theories of poverty
