= Cycle of poverty =

Vicious cycle that reinforces poverty

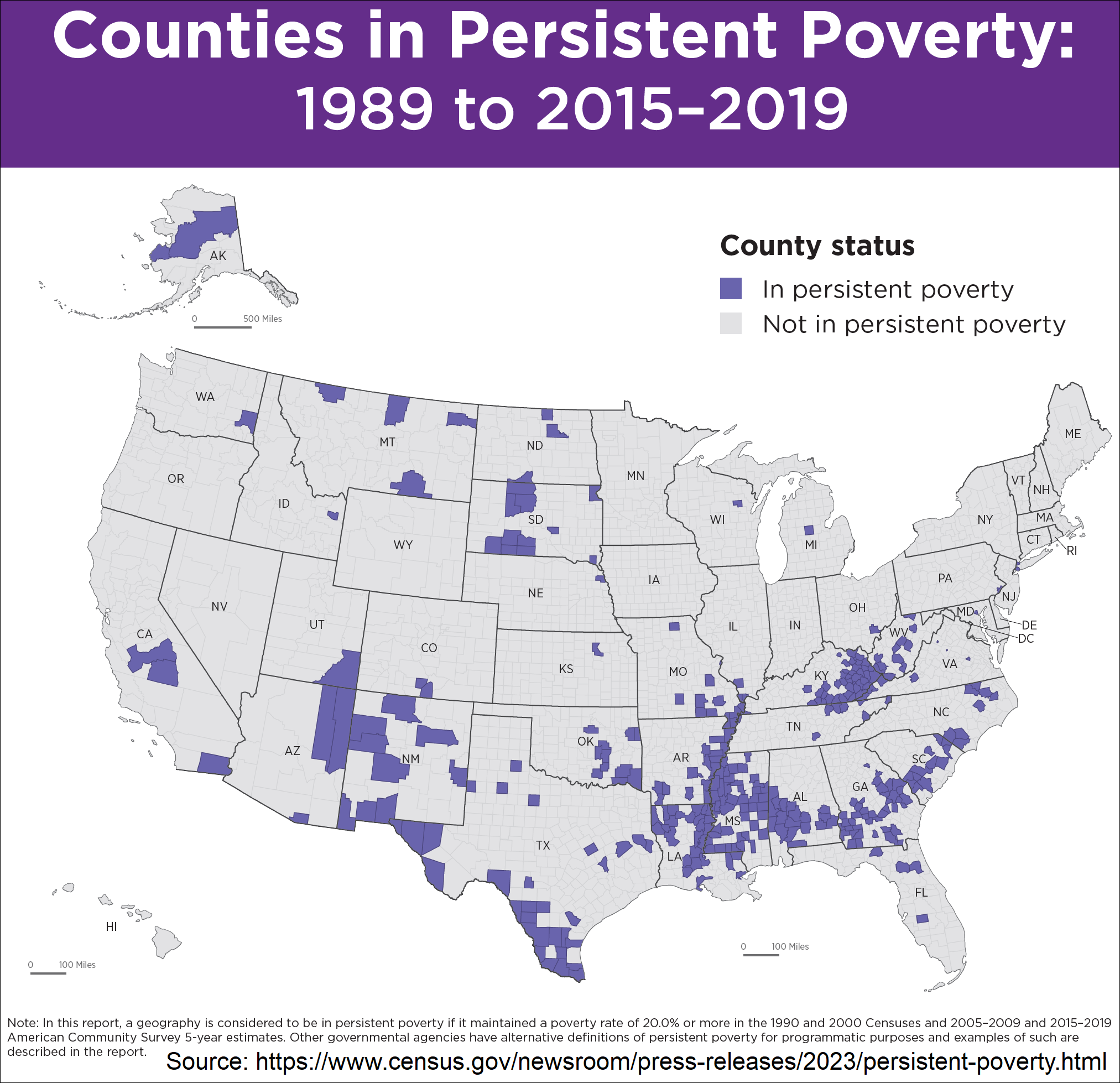
United States. Map highlighting counties defined as "persistent poverty counties".

In economics, a cycle of poverty, poverty trap or generational poverty is when poverty seems to be inherited, preventing subsequent generations from escaping it. This is known as the cycle of poverty. It is caused by self-reinforcing mechanisms that cause poverty, once it exists, to persist unless there is outside intervention. It can persist across generations, and when applied to developing countries, is also known as a development trap.

Families trapped in the cycle of poverty have few to no resources. There are many self-reinforcing disadvantages that make it virtually impossible for individuals to break the cycle. Lack of financial capital, education, and social connections all play a role in keeping the impoverished within the cycle of poverty. Those who are born into poverty have been shown to consistently remain poor throughout their lives.

Educational psychologist Ruby K. Payne, author of A Framework for Understanding Poverty, distinguishes between situational poverty, which can generally be traced to a specific incident within the lifetimes of the person or family members in poverty, and generational poverty, which is a cycle that passes from generation to generation, and goes on to argue that generational poverty has its own distinct culture and belief patterns.

Measures of social mobility examine how frequently poor people become wealthier, and how often children are wealthier or achieve higher income than their parents.

== Causes of the cycle ==
=== Economic factors ===
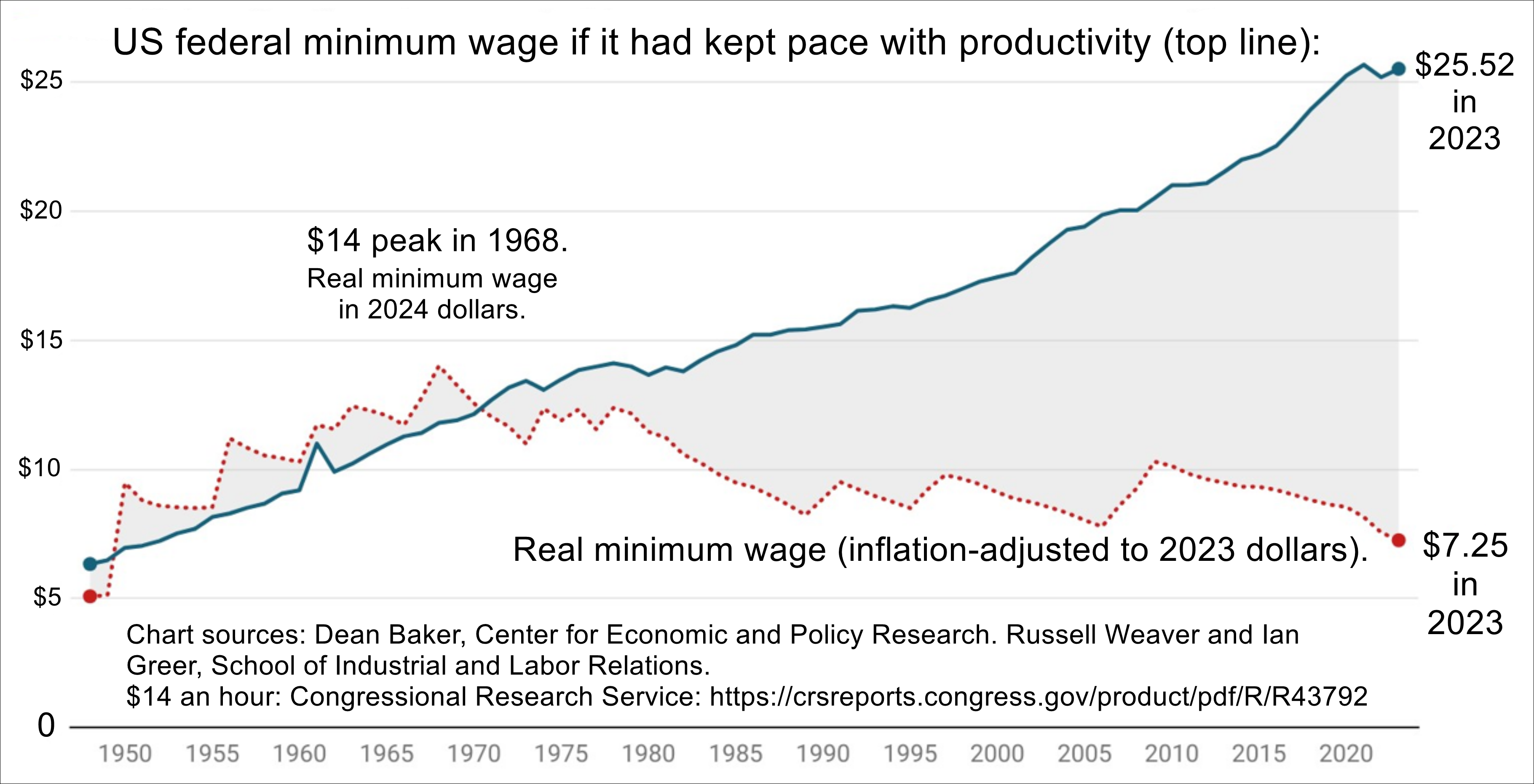
US federal minimum wage if it had kept pace with productivity. Also, the real minimum wage in inflation-adjusted dollars. It peaked in 1968.

Percent of Americans living below the poverty line in each U.S. state, and the District of Columbia. U.S. Census Bureau.

US map of hourly minimum wages by state and District of Columbia (D.C.), in US dollars. Date at top.

The US federal minimum wage has not kept up with inflation. It peaked in 1968 at $14 an hour in inflation-adjusted dollars. It has been at $7.25 an hour since 2009. Some, such as the Center for Law and Social Policy, the Center for American Progress, and Oxfam say that poverty is caused and maintained, to a significant degree, by low wages that some people in poverty earn. A low minimum wage also lowers wages above it too. It is more and more difficult for those households to get out of poverty, especially in states that haven't raised the minimum wage very much, or at all, since 2009. The Washington Center for Equitable Growth and The Review of Economic Studies noted studies that found that higher minimum wages in some places increased employment. One reason was that they lowered the rate of people leaving their jobs, thus increasing the number of filled jobs. The Robert Wood Johnson Foundation reported that researchers have determined that regardless of possible job losses (in some places) a federal minimum wage increase would bring great financial relief to many people.

However, some labor economists say that little poverty has been reduced following minimum wage increases. Others, such as the National Bureau of Economic Research, say their studies demonstrate that the negative consequences had on some low-wage earners due to minimum wage increases, such as minimum-wage earners in competitive markets having their work hours reduced or even losing employment after the minimum wage is increased, may not always be outweighed by the positive effects, depending on the unique circumstances of each labor market.

Some poor households, with or without full-time working members, have people that can not work very much, if at all. According to the United States Census, in 2012 people aged 18–64 living in poverty in the country gave the reason they did not work, by category:

- 31% – Ill or disabled
- 26% – Home or family reasons
- 21% – School or other
- 13% – Cannot find work
- 8% – Retired early

Some activities can also cost poor people more than wealthier people. For example, if unable to afford the first month's rent and security deposit for a typical apartment lease, people sometimes must live in a hotel or motel at a higher daily rate. If unable to afford an apartment with a refrigerator, kitchen, and stove, people may need to spend more on prepared meals than if they could cook for themselves and store leftovers.

According to the U.S. Government Accountability Office (GAO), about 20 percent of American families that include a worker earning up $7.25 per hour (the federal minimum wage), 13 percent of families with a worker earning from $7.25 to $12.00 per hour, and 5 percent of families with a worker earning from $12.01 to $16 per hour were in poverty over a period from 1995 to 2016.

In the case of banking, people who cannot maintain a minimum daily balance in a savings account are often charged fees by the bank, whereas people with larger amounts of wealth can earn interest on savings and substantial returns from investments. Unbanked people must use higher-cost alternative financial services, such as check-cashing services for payroll and money orders for transferring to other people. People who have had previous credit problems, such as overdrafting an account, may not be eligible to open a checking or savings account. Major reasons for not opening a bank account include not trusting banks, being concerned about not making a payment due to a bank error or delay, not understanding how banks work, and not having enough money to qualify for a free account.

Though most industrialized countries have free universal health care, in the United States and many developing countries, people with little savings often postpone expensive medical treatment as long as possible. This can cause a relatively small medical condition to become a serious condition that costs more to treat, and may cause lost wages due to missed hourly work. Poor people may have lower overall personal medical expenses simply because illnesses and medical conditions go untreated, but on average life span is shorter. Higher-income workers usually have medical insurance, which shields them from excessive costs and often encourages preventive care. In addition to available personal savings, higher-income workers are more likely to be salaried with specified personal time and sick days that prevents them from losing wages while seeking treatment.

Because no skills or experience are required, some people in poverty make money by volunteering for medical studies or donating blood plasma.

=== Internal and external factors sustaining poverty ===
Amongst the most popular characterizations of the ongoing experience of poverty are that:

1. It is systemic or institutionalized or
2. A person is misguided by emotional challenges driven by historical experiences or
3. A person is affected by a mental disability,

or a combination of all three reasons.

==== Systemic factors ====
Donald Curtis (2006), a researcher at the School of Public Policy in the United Kingdom, identified that governments regard the welfare system as an enabling task. Curtis (2006) maintained, however, that the system lacks cohesiveness, and is not designed to be an empowerment tool.

For example, outside parties are funded to manage the effort without much oversight, creating a disconnected system, for which no one leads (Curtis, 2006). The result is mismanagement of budget without forwarding progress, and those that remain in the poverty loophole are accused of draining the system (Curtis, 2006).

==== Bias ====
Jill Suttie (2018), wrote that implicit bias can be transferred nonverbally to children with no more than a look or a gesture, and as such is a learned behavior. Critical thinking skills can ward off implicit bias, but without education and practice, habitual thoughts can cloud judgment and poorly affect future decisions.

==== Decision-making ====
A Dartmouth College (2016) study reported that probabilistic decision-making follows prior-based knowledge of failure in similar situations. Rather than choose success, people respond as if the failure has already taken place. Those who have experienced intergenerational poverty are most susceptible to this kind of learned behavior (Wagmiller & Adelman, 2009).

==== Intergenerational ====
Professors of Sociology Wagmiller and Adelman (2009) asserted that roughly 35–46% of people who have experienced hardship in young and middle adulthood also experienced moderate to severe poverty in childhood. As of 2018, 7.5 million people experienced poverty in California alone (Downs, 2018).

==== Mental illness ====
In a qualitative study, Rudnick et al., (2014), studied people living in poverty with mental illness and determined that participants felt that wellness care, nutrition, housing, and jobs were severely lacking. Respondents asserted that the most significant problem was access to quality services; bureaucratic systems appear to be devoid of logic and treatment by providers were often unaccommodating and uncooperative (Rudnick et al., 2014).

==== Lowered productivity ====
The stress of worrying about one's personal finances can cause lower productivity. One study on factory workers in India found payment earlier in the work period increased average worker output by 6.2%.

=== Choices and culture ===
According to a 2009 and 2011 study made by the Brookings Institution, people who finish high school, get a full-time job, and wait until age 21 to marry and have children end up with a poverty rate of only 2%, whereas people who follow none of the steps end up with a poverty rate of 76%.

=== Early childhood adversity and basic needs stressors contributing to the cycle of generational poverty ===
The stress of early childhood adversities, including basic need stressors, abuse, and neglect, are major causes of generational poverty. Studies have shown that the trauma of child abuse manifests negatively in adult life in overall health and even in employment status. Abuse and neglect are potential adversities facing those in poverty, the adversity that is shared among all below the poverty line is the daily stress over basic needs. "The stress of meeting basic needs takes all precedent in the family, and children learn that the only way to survive is to focus on getting basic needs met". Every member of a household in poverty is impacted by basic need stressors. The ability to secure and pay for childcare is another contributing factor to the problems those in poverty have with finding and keeping a job.

These stressors are not just unpleasant, they are catastrophic to a body's health and development. Exposure to chronic stress can induce changes in the architecture of different regions of the developing brain (e.g., amygdala, hippocampus), which can impact a range of important functions, such as regulating the stress response, attention, memory, planning, and learning new skills, and also contribute to dysregulation of inflammatory response systems that can lead to a chronic "wear and tear" effect on multiple organ systems. Chronic stress is detrimental to our health and has even been proven to harm memory and organs, including the brain. Working memory, defined as a human's capacity to store information in the brain for immediate use, is known to be shorter for children raised in poverty versus those raised in a middle-class environment. Children suffering through basic needs stressors from the earliest of years have to work harder than their peers to learn and absorb information.

== Family background ==
A 2002 research paper titled "The Changing Effect of Family Background on the Incomes of American Adults" analyzed changes in the determinants of family income between 1961 and 1999, focusing on the effect of parental education, occupational rank, income, marital status, family size, region of residence, race, and ethnicity. The paper (1) outlines a simple framework for thinking about how family background affects children's family and income, (2) summarizes previous research on trends in intergenerational inheritance in the United States, (3) describes the data used as a basis for the research which it describes, (4) discusses trends in inequality among parents, (5) describes how the effects of parental inequality changed between 1961 and 1999, (6) contrasts effects at the top and bottom of the distribution, and (7) discusses whether intergenerational correlations of zero would be desirable. The paper concludes by posing the question of whether reducing the intergenerational correlation is an efficient strategy for reducing poverty or inequality.

Because improving the skills of disadvantaged children seems relatively easy, it is an attractive strategy. However, judging by American experience since the 1960s, improving the skills of disadvantaged children has proved difficult. As a result, the paper suggests, there are probably cheaper and easier ways to reduce poverty and inequality, such as supplementing the wages of the poor or changing immigration policy so that it drives down the relative wages of skilled rather than unskilled workers. These alternative strategies would not reduce intergenerational correlations, but they would reduce the economic gap between children who started life with all the disadvantages instead of all the advantages.

Another paper, titled Do poor children become poor adults?, which was originally presented at a 2004 symposium on the future of children from disadvantaged families in France, and was later included in a 2006 collection of papers related to the theme of the dynamics of inequality and poverty, discusses generational income mobility in North America and Europe. The paper opens by observing that in the United States almost one half of children born to low income parents become low income adults, four in ten in the United Kingdom, and one-third in Canada. The paper goes on to observe that rich children also tend to become rich adults—four in ten in the U.S. and the U.K., and as many as one-third in Canada. The paper argues, however, that money is not the only or even the most important factor influencing intergenerational income mobility. The rewards to higher skilled and/or higher educated individuals in the labor market and the opportunities for children to obtain the required skills and credentials are two important factors. Conclusions that income transfers to lower income individuals may be important to children but they should not be counted on to strongly promote generational mobility. The paper recommends that governments focus on investments in children to ensure that they have the skills and opportunities to succeed in the labor market, and observes that though this has historically meant promoting access to higher and higher levels of education, it is becoming increasingly important that attention be paid to preschool and early childhood education.

=== Lack of jobs due to deindustrialization ===
Sociologist William Julius Wilson has said that the economic restructuring of changes from manufacturing to a service-based economy has led to a high percentage of joblessness in the inner-cities and with it a loss of skills and an inability to find jobs. This "mismatch" of skills to jobs available is said to be the main driver of poverty.

=== Effects of modern education ===
Research shows that schools with students who perform lower than the norm are also those hiring least-qualified teachers as a result of new teachers generally working in the area that they grew up in. This leads to certain schools not producing many students who enter tertiary education. Graduates who previously attended these schools are not as skilled as they would be if they had gone to a school with higher-qualified instructors. This leads to education perpetuating a cycle of poverty. People who choose to work in the schools close to them do not adequately supply the school with enough teachers. The schools must then outsource their teachers from other areas. Susanna Loeb from the School of Education at Stanford conducted a study and found that teachers who are brought in from the suburbs are 10 times more likely to transfer out of the school after their initial year. The fact that the teachers from the suburbs leave appears to be an influential factor for schools hiring more teachers from that area. The lack of adequate education for children is part of what allows for the cycle of poverty to continue. The problem undergoing this is the lack of updating the knowledge of the staff. Schools have continued to conduct professional development the same way they have for decades.

=== Culture of poverty ===
Another theory for the perpetual cycle of poverty is that poor people have their own culture with a different set of values and beliefs that keep them trapped within that cycle from generation to generation. This theory has been explored by Ruby K. Payne in her book A Framework for Understanding Poverty. In this book she explains how a social class system in the United States exists, where there is a wealthy upper class, a middle class, and the working poor class. These classes each have their own set of rules and values, which differ from each other. To understand the culture of poverty, Payne describes how these rules affect the poor and tend to keep them trapped in this continual cycle. Time is treated differently by the poor; they generally do not plan ahead but simply live in the moment, which keeps them from saving money that could help their children escape poverty.

Payne emphasizes how important it is when working with the poor to understand their unique cultural differences so that one does not get frustrated but instead tries to work with them on their ideologies and help them to understand how they can help themselves and their children escape the cycle. One aspect of generational poverty is a learned helplessness that is passed from parents to children; a mentality that there is no way for one to get out of poverty and so in order to make the best of the situation one must enjoy what one can when one can. This leads to such habits as spending money immediately, often on unnecessary goods such as alcohol and cigarettes, thus teaching their children to do the same and trapping them in poverty. Payne states that leaving poverty is not as simple as acquiring money and moving into a higher class but also includes giving up certain relationships in exchange for achievement. A student's peers can have an influence on the child's level of achievement. Coming from a low-income household a child could be teased or expected to fall short academically. This can cause a student to feel discouraged and hold back when it comes to getting involved more with their education because they are scared to be teased if they fail. This helps to explain why the culture of poverty tends to endure from generation to generation as most of the relationships the poor have are within that class.

The "culture of poverty" theory has been debated and critiqued by many people, including Eleanor Burke Leacock (and others) in her book The Culture of Poverty: A Critique. Leacock claims that people who use the term, "culture of poverty" only "contribute to the distorted characterizations of the poor". In addition, Michael Hannan in an essay argues that the "culture of poverty" is "essentially untestable". This is due to many things including the highly subjective nature of poverty and issues concerning the universal act of classifying only some impoverished people as trapped in the culture.

=== Life shocks ===
2004 research in New Zealand produced a report that showed that "life shocks" can be endured only to a limited extent, after which people are much more likely to be tipped into hardship. The researchers found very little differences in living standards for people who have endured up to 7 negative events in their lifetime. People who had 8 or more life shocks were dramatically more likely to live in poverty than those who had 0 to 7 life shocks. A few of the life shocks studied were:

- Marital
  - Marriage (or similar) break-ups (divorce)
  - Becoming a single parent
  - Unplanned pregnancy and birth of a child
- Lost of income (or increase in debt):
  - Bankruptcy
  - Substantial financial loss
  - Redundancy (being laid off from a job)
  - 3 months or more unemployed
  - Unexpected and substantial drop in income
  - A non-custodial sentence (community service, or fines, but not imprisonment)
- Forced sale of house
- Eviction
- Major damage to home
- House burgled
- Victim of violence
- Incarceration
- Illness lasting three weeks or more
- Major injury or health problem

The study focused on just a few possible life shocks, but many others are likely as traumatic or more so. Chronic PTSD, complex PTSD, and depression sufferers could have innumerable causes for their mental illness, including those studied above. The study is subject to some criticism.

=== Tracking in education ===
History in the United States has shown that Americans saw education as the way to end the perpetual cycle of poverty. In the present, children from low to middle income households are at a disadvantage. They are twice as likely to be held back and more likely not to graduate from high school. Recent studies have shown that the cause for the disparity among academic achievement results from the school's structure where some students succeed from an added advantage and others fail as a result of lacking that advantage. Educational institutions with a learning disparity are causing education to be a sustaining factor for the cycle of poverty. One prominent example of this type of school structures is tracking, which is predominantly used to help organize a classroom so the variability of academic ability in classes is decreased. Students are tracked based on their ability level, generally based on a standardized test after which they are given different course requirements. Some people believe that tracking "enhances academic achievement and improves the self-concept of students by permitting them to progress at their own pace".

The negative side is that studies have shown that tracking decreases students' opportunity to learn. Tracking also has a disproportionate number of Latinos and African Americans that have low socioeconomic status in the lower learning tracks. Tracking separates social classes putting the poor and minority children in lower tracks where they receive second-rate education, and the students who are better off are placed in upper tracks where they have many opportunities for success. Studies have found that in addition to the higher tracks having more extensive curriculum, there is also a disparity among the teachers and instructional resources provided. There appears to be a race/class bias which results in intelligent children not receiving the skills or opportunities needed for success or social/economic mobility, thus continuing the cycle of poverty. There is an overall perception that American education is failing and research has done nothing to counter this statement, but instead has revealed the reality and severity of the issue of the existence of tracking and other structures that cause the cycle of poverty to continue.

== Theories and strategies for breaking the cycle ==
Shiva Kumar – the importance of MDGs in redefining what are the poverty drivers

=== General approaches ===
While many governmental officials are still trying to solve poverty, many states and localities are making an effort to break the cycle. Mayor Bloomberg of New York City has been advocating a plan where parents are paid up to $5,000 a year for meeting certain goals that will better their lives. This policy was modeled after a Mexican initiative that aims to help poor families make better decisions that will help them in the long-term and break cycle of poverty and dependence that have been known to last for generations. In addition, many states also have been making an attempt to help break the cycle. For example, a bill has been proposed in the California Assembly that "would establish an advisory Childhood Poverty Council to develop a plan to reduce child poverty in the state by half by 2017 and eliminate it by 2027". Even when the plan has poverty reduction as the goal, a rise in child poverty might be the reality for many states as it was in Connecticut. States are attempting to not only decrease the number of people in the cycle of poverty, but to also adjust the stringent work requirements that resulted from Congress's welfare reform. The tougher work restrictions have upset many poverty advocates who believe the new regulations prevent individuals who are vulnerable or who lack skills from preparing for work. California Democratic Representative McDermott believes as a result of this and other effects of the new limitations, it has been harder for individuals to escape a life of poverty.

Relatively modest increases in benefit levels for programs that assist nonworking individuals and low-income workers might well be sufficient to bring the United States into line with...other affluent nations in its degree of poverty reduction.

— Lane Kenworthy

In his book Children in Jeopardy: Can We Break the Cycle, Irving B. Harris discusses ways in which children can be helped to begin breaking the cycle of poverty. He stresses the importance of starting early and teaching children the importance of education from a very young age as well as making sure these children get the same educational opportunities as students who are richer. Family values such as nurturing children and encouraging them to do well in school need to be promoted as well as a non-authoritarian approach to parenting. Harris also discusses the importance of discouraging teenage pregnancy and finding ways in which to decrease this phenomenon so that when children are born they are planned and wanted and thus have a better chance at breaking the cycle of poverty.

It has been suggested by researchers like Lane Kenworthy that increasing welfare benefits and extending them to non-working families can help reduce poverty as nations that have done so have had better results.

The Harlem Children's Zone is working to end generational poverty within a 100-block section of Harlem using an approach that provides educational support and services for children and their families from birth through college. This approach has been recognized as a model by the Obama administration's anti-poverty program.

=== Two-generation poverty alleviation approach ===
A two-generation poverty alleviation approach focuses on the education, health and social services, and opportunities that parents and children desperately need to lift their families from the depths of the bondage of poverty to a stable and healthy state mentally, physically, and financially. A two-generation approach is a holistic plan for poverty alleviation and "is needed to help low-income parents and children improve their situation". Using a two-generation approach, parents are taught additional career skills, provided leadership training, and given access to job opportunities with higher wages. Children are given access to better educational programs, free preschool, free childcare, and the supplies they'll need to be successful in school. The family unit receives counseling for the current stressors of poverty as well as childhood trauma. All members of the household are given access to full healthcare benefits, food services at home and in school, and financial relief for their bills, clothing, and transportation in the short-term to relieve the basic needs stressors that prevent the family from taking the time to learn and grow. The preschool program Head Start believes that the only system that works for a preschool is one where the child as a whole is considered, which includes their health and their parents' ability to succeed. The two-generation poverty alleviation approach sees each member relieved of the basic needs stressors that plague their minds, ensures that they are physically and mentally healthy, provides them the opportunities to learn the skills needed for higher wage jobs, and gives them access to higher wage jobs without discrimination.

=== Austerity ===
In his 2014 book, Mark Blyth claims that austerity not only fails to stimulate growth, but effectively passes that debt down to the working classes. As such, many academics such as Andrew Gamble view Austerity in Britain less as an economic necessity, and more as a tool of statecraft, driven by ideology and not economic requirements. A study published in The BMJ in November 2017 found the Conservative government austerity programme had been linked to approximately 120,000 deaths since 2010; however, this was disputed, for example on the grounds that it was an observational study which did not show cause and effect. More studies claim adverse effects of austerity on population health, which include an increase in the mortality rate among pensioners which has been linked to unprecedented reductions in income support, an increase in suicides and the prescription of antidepressants for patients with mental health issues, and an increase in violence, self-harm, and suicide in prisons.

=== Mass incarceration ===
Several scholars have linked mass incarceration of the poor in the United States with the rise of neoliberalism. Sociologist Loïc Wacquant and Marxist economic geographer David Harvey have argued that the criminalization of poverty and mass incarceration is a neoliberal policy for dealing with social instability among economically marginalized populations. According to Wacquant, this situation follows the implementation of other neoliberal policies, which have allowed for the retrenchment of the social welfare state and the rise of punitive workfare, whilst increasing gentrification of urban areas, privatization of public functions, the shrinking of collective protections for the working class via economic deregulation and the rise of underpaid, precarious wage labor. By contrast, it is extremely lenient in dealing with those in the upper echelons of society, in particular when it comes to economic crimes of the upper class and corporations such as fraud, embezzlement, insider trading, credit and insurance fraud, money laundering and violation of commerce and labor codes. According to Wacquant, neoliberalism does not shrink government, but instead sets up a "centaur state" with little governmental oversight for those at the top and strict control of those at the bottom.

== Effects on children ==
Children are most vulnerable to the cycle of poverty. Because a child is dependent on their guardian(s), if a child's guardian is in poverty, then they will be also. It is almost impossible for a child to pull themself out of the cycle due to age, lack of experience, lack of a job, etc. Because children are at such a young and impressionable age, the scars they gain from experiencing poverty early in life inevitably carry on into their adult life. "Childhood lays the foundations for adult abilities, interests, and motivation." Therefore, if they learn certain poverty-related behaviors in childhood, the behaviors are more likely to perpetuate.

Studies have shown that household structure sometimes has a connection to childhood poverty. Most studies on the subject also show that the children who are in poverty tend to come from single-parent households (most often matriarchal). In 1997, nearly 8.5 million (57%) poor children in the US came from single-parent households. With the rate of divorce increasing and the number of children born out of wedlock increasing, the number of children who are born into or fall into single-parent households is also increasing. However, this does not mean that the child/children will be impoverished because of it.

According to Ashworth, Hill, & Walker (2004), both urban and rural poor children are more likely to be isolated from the nonpoor in schools, neighborhoods, and their communities. Human nature is to have relationships with others but when a child is isolated due to their socioeconomic status, it is hard to overcome that when the status does not improve. Therefore, poor children also have more tense relationships which sometimes results in abnormal, non-constructive, or other unexplained behaviors.

There have been programs developed to specifically address the needs of poor children. Francis Marion University's Center of Excellence to Prepare Teachers of Children of Poverty has a number of initiatives devoted to equipping teachers to be more effective in raising the achievement of children of poverty. It is located in South Carolina and provides direct teacher training as well as facilitates research in the area of poverty and scholastic achievement. Head Start is a program for low income families who provides early childhood education as well as parent involvement. Results show that attending these programs increases children's academic outcomes. The problem is that in high poverty areas this is supposed to be a helpful resource, but they start to hold lower quality due to lack of funds to keep places updated.

Often the communities in which impoverished children grow up in are crime ridden areas; examples of these areas in America are Harlem and the Bronx. Crime and maltreatment at a young age may reduce a child's ability to learn by up to 5%. Adopting a criminal lifestyle only worsens the effects of the cycle as they are often incarcerated or killed in many types of gang violence.

== Developing world ==
In the developing world, many factors can contribute to a poverty trap, including: limited access to credit and capital markets, extreme environmental degradation (which depletes agricultural production potential), corrupt governance, capital flight, poor education systems, disease ecology, lack of public health care, war and poor infrastructure.

Jeffrey Sachs, in his book The End of Poverty, discusses the poverty trap and prescribes a set of policy initiatives intended to end the trap. He recommends that aid agencies behave as venture capitalists funding start-up companies. Venture capitalists, once they choose to invest in a venture, do not give only half or a third of the amount they feel the venture needs in order to become profitable; if they did, their money would be wasted. If all goes as planned, the venture will eventually become profitable and the venture capitalist will experience an adequate rate of return on investment. Likewise, Sachs proposes, developed countries cannot give only a fraction of what is needed in aid and expect to reverse the poverty trap in Africa. Just like any other start-up, developing nations absolutely must receive the amount of aid necessary (and promised at the G-8 Summit in 2005) for them to begin to reverse the poverty trap. The problem is that unlike start-ups, which simply go bankrupt if they fail to receive funding, in Africa people continue to die at a high rate due in large part to lack of sufficient aid.

Sachs points out that the extreme poor lack six major kinds of capital: human capital, business capital, infrastructure, natural capital, public institutional capital, and knowledge capital. He then details the poverty trap:

The poor start with a very low level of capital per person, and then find themselves trapped in poverty because the ratio of capital per person actually falls from generation to generation. The amount of capital per person declines when the population is growing faster than capital is being accumulated ... The question for growth in per capita income is whether the net capital accumulation is large enough to keep up with population growth.

Sachs argues that sufficient foreign aid can make up for the lack of capital in poor countries, maintaining that, "If the foreign assistance is substantial enough, and lasts long enough, the capital stock rises sufficiently to lift households above subsistence."

Sachs believes the public sector should focus mainly on investments in human capital (health, education, nutrition), infrastructure (roads, power, water and sanitation, environmental conservation), natural capital (conservation of biodiversity and ecosystems), public institutional capital (a well-run public administration, judicial system, police force), and parts of knowledge capital (scientific research for health, energy, agriculture, climate, ecology). Sachs leaves business capital investments to the private sector, which he claims would more efficiently use funding to develop the profitable enterprises necessary to sustain growth. In this sense, Sachs views public institutions as useful in providing the public goods necessary to begin the Rostovian take-off model, but maintains that private goods are more efficiently produced and distributed by private enterprise. This is a widespread view in neoclassical economics.

Several other forms of poverty traps are discussed in the literature, including nations being landlocked with bad neighbors; a vicious cycle of violent conflict; subsistence traps in which farmers wait for middlemen before they specialize but middlemen wait for a region to specialize first; working capital traps in which petty sellers have inventories too sparse to earn enough money to get a bigger inventory; low skill traps in which workers wait for jobs using special skill but firms wait for workers to get such skills; nutritional traps in which individuals are too malnourished to work, yet too poor to afford sustainable food; and behavioral traps in which individuals cannot differentiate between temptation and non-temptation goods, and therefore cannot invest in the non-temptation goods which could help them begin to escape poverty.

== See also ==
- Boots theory
- Circular cumulative causation
- Collateral consequences of criminal conviction
- Cost of poverty
- Culture of poverty
- Deprivation index
- Debtors' prison
- Diseases of poverty
- Economic inequality
- Feminization of poverty
- Financial intelligence
- Financial social work
- Glass ceiling
- Horatio Alger myth
- Kill line
- List of countries by percentage of population living in poverty
- Make Poverty History
- Poverty
- Poverty reduction
- Poverty threshold
- Rural ghetto
- Social mobility
- Theories of poverty
- Virtuous circle and vicious circle
- Welfare state
- Welfare trap
- Welfare's effect on poverty
- Working poor
