= Desert (philosophy) =

Condition of being deserving of something, whether good or bad

Desert (/dɪˈzɜːrt/) in philosophy is the condition of being deserving of something, whether good or bad. One type of this is moral desert. It is a concept often associated with justice and morality: that good deeds should be rewarded and evil deeds punished.

== Nomenclature ==
The word desert (in this sense) derives from the Old French deserte, meaning "merit" or "recompense", a noun form of the Old French verb deservir, meaning "to deserve". It is therefore unrelated, or has only tenuous partial relation, to similar words such as desert (biome), desert (abandon), and dessert (dining).

The term desert in this sense is the source of the expression "just deserts" (e.g., "Although she was not at first arrested for the crime, she later on received her just deserts.").

In ordinary usage, to deserve is to earn or merit a reward or penalty. In moral philosophy, it is generally argued that any reward or penalty that is deserved must be morally relevant in some way. For example, a low moral relevance example might be a person purchasing a lottery ticket and winning the grand prize; they may be entitled to the money, and they did pay for the ticket, but the moral connection is loose. A similar example might be finding valuable resources such as oil or gold on inherited land. Moderate examples might be that after working at a job, the employee is paid, or after a well-done concert, the musician receives a round of applause. Failing to pay for items or services (or paying then not receiving them) would be considered a breach of contract and expectations and has at least some moral heft. High moral relevance examples can be more abstract and less related directly to the actor's expectation, and often come up with punishments. For the job example, perhaps a very valuable employee is paid their "true" worth rather than their agreed upon salary: a bonus for someone single-handedly providing the employer exceptional value, or their salary is clawed back if the employee is an active negative for the company (perhaps they are committing embezzlement). Evildoers have bad things happen to them, even if not directly intended by a human justice system; a freak accident that wounds or kills a criminal would be considered by some to be some sort of deserved karmic justice.

== Formulation ==
Desert claims may be generally expressed as: Thing X deserves Y in virtue of Z. For example, I (X) deserve a good grade on my test (Y) because I studied hard (Z); Cincinnati (X) deserves to be praised (Y) because it is a pretty city (Z). Some authors have added a further criterion, qualifying Z. That is, Agent X deserves Y in virtue of Z if X is responsible for Z (or, alternatively, if X is also deserving of Z). Considering this stipulation, one does not deserve respect simply because one is a human being, because one is not responsible for being a human being (Z). Arguments such as this are contentious as they suggest an untenability of intrinsic desert claims—that is, claims wherein Z means simply to be X. Less controversially, if one (X) uses steroids to win in a footrace, one is said not to deserve to win (Y) because one is not responsible for, and so does not deserve, one's enhanced physical abilities (Z).

== Critique by John Rawls ==
One of the most controversial rejections of the concept of desert was made by the political philosopher John Rawls. Rawls, writing in the mid to late twentieth century, claimed that a person cannot claim credit for being born with greater natural endowments (such as superior intelligence or athletic abilities), as it is purely the result of the "natural lottery". Therefore, that person does not morally deserve the fruits of his or her talents and/or efforts, such as a good job or a high salary. However, Rawls was careful to explain that, even though he dismissed the concept of moral Desert, people can still legitimately expect to receive the benefits of their efforts and/or talents. The distinction here lies between Desert and, in Rawls' own words, "Legitimate Expectations".

Rawls' remarks about natural endowments provoked an often-referred response by Robert Nozick. Nozick claimed that to treat peoples' natural talents as collective assets is to contradict the very basis of the deontological liberalism Rawls wishes to defend, i.e., respect for the individual and the distinction between persons. Nozick argued that Rawls' suggestion that not only natural talents but also virtues of character are undeserved aspects of ourselves for which we cannot take credit, "...can succeed in blocking the introduction of a person's autonomous choices and actions (and their results) only by attributing everything noteworthy about the person completely to certain sorts of 'external' factors. So denigrating a person's autonomy and prime responsibility for his actions is a risky line to take for a theory that otherwise wishes to buttress the dignity and self-respect of autonomous beings."

Nozick's critique has been interpreted in different ways. The conventional understanding of it is as a libertarian assessment of procedural justice, which maintains that while it might be true that people's actions are wholly or partly determined by factors that are morally arbitrary, this is irrelevant to assignments of distributive shares. Individuals are self-owners with inviolable rights in their bodies and talents, and they have the freedom to take advantage of these regardless of whether the self-owned properties are theirs for reasons that are morally arbitrary or not.

Michael Zuckert has suggested that Rawls has entirely mistaken the very logic of desert. If justice is getting what one is due, then the basis of desert must ultimately be undeserved. However, desert is a relational concept that expresses a relationship between a deserved and a basis of desert. It simply destroys the character of desert to demand, as Rawls does, that the basis of desert be itself deserved. For example, if we say a man deserves some primary good because of some quality or action "Y", we can always ask, as Rawls does, "but does he deserve 'Y'?" and so on. We then either have an infinite regress of bases of desert or arrive at some basis, some beginning point, which the individual cannot claim to have deserved or to be responsible for, but only to have or have been given by nature. After all, no human being exists causa sui; even to reduce the basis of claims to the very narrow one of life itself reveals Rawls' difficulty: surely no one can "deserve" or "claim credit for" their own existence. To demand, as Rawls does, that no just claim rest on an undeserved base simply means that we must cease speaking about justice, for on the basis of that demand there can never be any just claims - not even for equality. Rawls' analysis of justice rests on a notion of desert which violates the concept of desert and therefore does not provide a more precise notion of the bases of desert, but rather dissolves entirely the concept of desert and with it justice. The many debates over justice in political life and in philosophy concern the actual substantive question of what are the proper bases of desert. That is, underlying every conception of justice must be a claim of right, a positive claim of desert. The great failing of Rawls' argument is that he provides no substantive basis for a claim right or desert; but this failing is, paradoxically, also the source of the great appeal or excitement about Rawls' theory. His approach seems to avoid the difficulties of the traditional debates and the value questions they necessarily raise and yet seems to enable him to discuss normative questions such as justice.

== Jean Hampton ==
Another, more unconventional interpretation of Nozick's critique is proposed by Jean Hampton. She points out that there seems to be a subterranean assumption in Nozick's rejection of Rawls' account of natural endowments as collective assets. This assumption is the idea that the choices individuals make regarding how they will use their labor and their property are ones for which they should be held responsible. People who do not work hard and invest imprudently should be held responsible for those choices and not receive assistance from an egalitarian welfare state. If they do work hard and invest well however, they should also be held responsible for those choices and allowed to reap the benefits from their strivings. Hampton asks the question "whether the ground of Nozick's conception of absolute rights is not only a conception of liberty but also a conception of moral responsibility that is [...] closely associated to our notion of liberty."

There are other political philosophers who endorse the position Hampton outlines. Their main observation is that sometimes people who are badly off might be so because of their own irresponsible conduct, and the charge is that theories favoring policies of redistribution of wealth from the rich to the poor ignore this crucial point, i.e. that people might be unequally deserving because of their actions.

== Consequences ==
Sometimes the claim is that the redistributive systems often favored by egalitarian political theorists might have disastrous consequences in that they promote sloth and allow free riding on the productive by the lazy. These arguments are instrumental in their appeal to undeservingness. They refer to the allegedly bad consequences of a redistributive social system and do not necessarily involve any reference to the moral worthiness of those who make greater efforts, wiser investments, and so on.

At other times however, the argument invokes a moral ideal holding desert valuable for its own sake. On this view, helping the undeserving and failing to help the deserving is deemed intrinsically unfair regardless of further consequences. For example, the charge against Rawls is that people actually might deserve the gains flowing from their natural endowments, or at least those they achieve by striving conscientiously.

== Converse ==
Deserving something generally builds from some action and what should ideally result from it. Many people invert this process, consciously or unconsciously. A trivial example might be "lawbreakers deserve to go to jail", with the logical converse being "people in jail must have been lawbreakers." This may often be true but ignores the possibility of a miscarriage of justice where an entirely innocent person might be suffering. At its extremes, the converse can lead to victim blaming, where when a terrible event happens to someone, an observer concludes that it is merely just retribution for some misdeed in the past. The just-world fallacy is the worldview that "everything happens for a reason", and that seemingly random events are actually morally fitting, if perhaps on a delayed timescale.

== Political issues ==
Across the board, a number of industries are stratified across the genders. This is the result of a variety of factors. These include differences in education choices, preferred job and industry, work experience, number of hours worked, and breaks in employment (such as for bearing and raising children). Men also typically go into higher paid and higher risk jobs when compared to women. These factors result in 60% to 75% difference between men's and women's average aggregate wages or salaries, depending on the source. Various explanations for the remaining 25% to 40% have been suggested, including women's lower willingness and ability to negotiate salary and sexual discrimination. According to the European Commission direct discrimination only explains a small part of gender wage differences.

Larry Summers estimated in 2007 that the lower 80% of families were receiving $664 billion less income than they would be with a 1979 income distribution, or approximately $7,000 per family. Not receiving this income may have led many families to increase their debt burden, a significant factor in the 2007–2009 subprime mortgage crisis, as highly leveraged homeowners suffered a much larger reduction in their net worth during the crisis. Further, since lower income families tend to spend relatively more of their income than higher income families, shifting more of the income to wealthier families may slow economic growth.

According to a 2020 study, global earnings inequality has decreased substantially since 1970. During the 2000s and 2010s, the share of earnings by the world's poorest half doubled. Two researchers claim that global income inequality is decreasing due to strong economic growth in developing countries. According to a January 2020 report by the United Nations Department of Economic and Social Affairs, economic inequality between states had declined, but intrastate inequality has increased for 70% of the world population over the period 1990–2015. In 2015, the OECD reported in 2015 that income inequality is higher than it has ever been within OECD member nations and is at increased levels in many emerging economies. According to a June 2015 report by the International Monetary Fund (IMF):

Widening income inequality is the defining challenge of our time. In advanced economies, the gap between the rich and poor is at its highest level in decades. Inequality trends have been more mixed in emerging markets and developing countries (EMDCs), with some countries experiencing declining inequality, but pervasive inequities in access to education, health care, and finance remain.

A study by the Brandeis University Institute on Assets and Social Policy which followed the same sets of families for 25 years found that there are vast differences in wealth across racial groups in the United States. The wealth gap between Caucasian and African-American families studied nearly tripled, from $85,000 in 1984 to $236,500 in 2009. The study concluded that factors contributing to the inequality included years of home ownership (27%), household income (20%), education (5%), and familial financial support and/or inheritance (5%). In an analysis of the American Opportunity Accounts Act, a bill to introduce Baby Bonds, Morningstar reported that by 2019 white families had more than seven times the wealth of the average Black family, according to the Survey of Consumer Finances.

A 2020 report by Oxfam and the Stockholm Environment Institute says that the wealthiest 10% of the global population were responsible for more than half of global carbon dioxide emissions from 1990 to 2015, which increased by 60%. According to a 2020 report by the UNEP, overconsumption by the rich is a significant driver of the climate crisis, and the wealthiest 1% of the world's population are responsible for more than double the greenhouse gas emissions of the poorest 50% combined. Inger Andersen, in the foreword to the report, said "this elite will need to reduce their footprint by a factor of 30 to stay in line with the Paris Agreement targets." A 2022 report by Oxfam found that the business investments of the wealthiest 125 billionaires emit 393 million metric tonnes of greenhouse gas emissions annually.

== See also ==
- Economic inequality
- Gender inequality
- Discrimination
- Justice
- Income distribution
- Distribution of wealth
- Poverty
- Racism
- Social mobility
- Economic mobility
- Effort heuristic
- Social inequality
- Social stigma
- Meritocracy
- Causes of poverty
- Theories of poverty
- Welfare
- Criticism of welfare
- Socioeconomic status
- Guaranteed minimum income
- List of basic income models
