= Zunafish =

Zunafish.com was a US-based website for the trading of idle media materials. The site facilitated the exchange of these items among members, with the community governed by a user-rating system. Trading was conducted in six categories: books, CDs, DVDs, video games, and VHS tapes. Audiobooks on either tape or CD formed a separate category.

== Organization and origins ==
Zunafish was owned by Zunafish Ventures, a New York State corporation. The company was privately financed and headquartered in New York City. The site was conceived and developed by Billy Bloom and Dan Elias. Development began in January 2003, and the site was launched in January 2006.

== Growth and initial press coverage ==
Four months after launch Zunafish became the subject of substantial press attention, leading to the initial growth of the trading community. On April 13, 2006, The New York Times devoted the front page of the "Circuits" section to Zunafish and its founders. Versions of the article were later featured in The International Herald Tribune, CNET.com, The Toronto Globe and Mail, other publications, and the site became a discussion topic in hundreds of "blogs". In August 2006 Zunafish was named by TIME Online as one of the "50 Coolest Websites" of the year. In the same month TIME Magazine featured Zunafish as "One of 7 Cool Sites You'll Want to Bookmark." In September PC Magazine named Zunafish one of the "Top Websites" of 2006.

== Trading protocol ==
Trading on Zunafish was a one-on-one transaction between two individuals. There was no membership fee and no minimum trading required. The cost to the member is 1 dollar when a trade is successfully completed. Members were provided with print-out shipping labels, with pre-calculated postage requirements, with which to send items to their new owners. Users were asked to rate their trading partners after the items have been exchanged.

== Sudden Disappearance of Zunafish ==
In January 2009, the website announced that Zunafish has gone off-line to implement enhancements to the site, and during this downtime, there will be no trading or site access. The Zunafish URL is now up for sale per the landing page.
