= Decriminalization =

Reduced or absence of a criminal penalty for certain acts, illegal or legal

Decriminalization or decriminalisation is the legislative process which removes prosecutions against an action so that the action remains illegal but has no criminal penalties or at most some civil fine. This reform is sometimes applied retroactively but otherwise comes into force from either the enactment of the law or from a specified date. In some cases regulated permits or fines may still apply (for contrast, see: legalization), and associated aspects of the original criminalized act may remain or become specifically classified as crimes. The term was coined by anthropologist Jennifer James to express sex workers' movements' "goals of removing laws used to target prostitutes", although it is now commonly applied to drug policies. The reverse process is criminalization.

Decriminalization reflects changing social and moral views. A society may come to the view that an act is not harmful, should no longer be criminalized, or is otherwise not a matter to be addressed by the criminal justice system. Examples of subject matter which have been the subject of changing views on criminality over time in various societies and countries include:

- Abortion (see: abortion law and abortion-rights movements)
- Assisted suicide
- Breastfeeding in public
- Clothing laws (including cross-dressing, see: legal issues)
- Drug possession and recreational drug use (see: drug liberalization)
- Euthanasia (see: legality of euthanasia)
- Gambling (see: gambling age)
- Homosexuality (see: decriminalization of homosexuality and LGBT rights by country or territory)
- Incest (see: legality of incest)
- Polygamy (see: legality of polygamy)
- Poverty (see: criminalization of poverty)
- Prostitution and sex work (see: decriminalization of sex work)
- Public nudity
- Steroid use in sport
- Suicide (see: suicide legislation)

In a federal country, acts may be decriminalized by one level of government while still subject to penalties levied by another; for example, possession of a decriminalized drug may still be subject to criminal charges by one level of government, but another may yet impose a monetary fine. This should be contrasted with legalization, which removes all or most legal detriments from a previously illegal act.

Many countries have the practice of not imposing prison sentences for that are considered as illegal but a less serious crime under that country's law, such as personal use of cannabis or personal use of certain other drugs without a prescription from a doctor.

== Drug-use decriminalization topics ==
- Colorado Amendment 64
- Law Enforcement Against Prohibition
- Legal history of cannabis in the United States
- Legality of cannabis
- Marijuana Policy Project
- Psilocybin decriminalization in the United States
- Responsible drug use
- Timeline of cannabis law
- War on drugs

== See also ==
- Alcohol prohibition
- Decriminalization of sex work
- Drug liberalization
- Drug policy of the Soviet Union
- Freedom of speech
- Internet freedom
- Legal issues of anabolic steroids
- Legalization
- Liberalization
- Prostitution in Belgium
- Prostitution in New Zealand
- Public-order crime
- Sex worker
- Social libertarianism
- Sodomy law
- Timeline of LGBT history
- Unenforced law
- Victimless crime
