= Attributions for poverty =

Attributions for poverty are the beliefs people hold about the causes of poverty. These beliefs are defined in terms of attribution theory, which is a social psychological perspective on how people make causal explanations about events in the world. In forming attributions, people rely on the information that is available to them in the moment, and their heuristics, or mental shortcuts. When considering the causes of poverty, people form attributions using the same tools: the information they have and mental shortcuts that are based on their experiences. Consistent with the literature on heuristics, people often rely on shortcuts to make sense of the causes of their own behavior and that of others, which often results in biased attributions. This information leads to perceptions about the causes of poverty, and in turn, ideas about how to eradicate poverty.

== Context/history of concept ==
=== Key themes from attribution theory ===
One finding in attribution theory is the actor-observer bias, where actors (someone taking an action) tend to attribute their own actions to situational cues, while observers (those observing the actor take action) may attribute the same action to stable, dispositional factors. Due to the actor-observer bias, an observer may understand the intentions and drivers to a person's behavior to be very different from the intentions or drivers perceived by the actor. There is an asymmetry in information that is available and salient between the actor and the observer. This bias has been cited in social psychology as the Fundamental Attribution Error. An observer's impression of the dispositional causes of behavior is linked to the uniqueness of the behavior in the situation. If an action seems unique to the person in a specific situation, where others act differently in the same situation, an observer is more likely to attribute the action to the person's individual characteristics.

Another relevant tendency in forming attributions of behaviors is the augmentation principle: when external factors suppresses the likelihood of an action, the presence of these external factors heighten the perceived individual internal drivers of behavior. In this situation, high risks or costs of taking an action introduced by external factors translates to greater dispositional attributions of the action to the actor. One example is the quintessential view of the American Dream: a person who successfully immigrated to the United States and created a prosperous life for herself and her family. This person's actions in creating success were made in a high-risk environment, in which an observer might attribute this person's actions to heightened levels internal resolve, determination, and ability.

Related attribution tendencies are depicted by the covariation and configuration concepts. The covariation concept posits that when an observer has information about an effect at two points in time, the observer will draw covariation attributions, in which one factor is associated in a certain direction with the other factor. The potential causes of the effect involve the person, the entity, and the time of the event. The phenomenology of attribution validity is born from this idea, in which responses to a particular stimulus are categorized by the distinctiveness of the effect in relation to the way other people and entities interact over time. The configuration concept builds on this phenomenon, where an observer uses a single observation to depict a causal inference between two factors, if there are no other plausible causes for the effect salient to the observer.

The correspondence bias shows that people tend to assume that behavior is attributed to internal characteristics in the absence of other information. In sum, people tend to believe that behavior reveals internal dispositions.

== Theory and/or experimental evidence ==
=== Individual differences in attributions for poverty ===
In the 1970s and 1980s, researchers found consistent preference among Americans for an individualistic view to explain poverty, which focuses the personal ability and effort-related factors. This individualistic view aligns with tendencies to blame the poor for their condition, since the causes of poverty are perceived to be from personal deficiencies. This stems from the American societal influence of meritocratic values. However, a study in 1996 in southern California found that structuralist views were more popular in explaining the causes of poverty, which displays more recently the influence of systemic and external drivers of poverty.

==== Identity and attributions for poverty ====
The "underdog perspective" indicates that society's most disadvantaged groups, or underdogs, will support views that challenge the merit of the dominant group's privileged status. Studies in England and the United States found support for this perspective by demonstrating that participants who favored egalitarian policy views were more likely to be in minority racial groups (nonwhite), have occupations with relatively lower prestige, be part of families with lower income, and identify as lower and working class. This perspective was reinforced in a study in southern California that assessed beliefs about the causes of poverty as being either individualistic - driven by ability and effort - or situational - caused by external and systemic forces. Black and Latino participants, who are the minority in both southern California and in the U.S. at large, were more likely to favor the external determinants for poverty than white participants. Consistent with the underdog perspective, women were more likely to favor the structural determinants of poverty than men. Having lower income increased the likelihood of favoring the structural perspective on causes to poverty than individualistic determinants as well.

In a study of Australian adults in 1989, attributions for poverty were associated with respondents' own explanations about their personal background. Individuals who felt that their experiences in life were driven by internal factors, such as their own disposition, efforts, and abilities, were more likely to attribute causes of poverty to internal factors. Individuals who felt that their life experiences were driven by chance or by other external factors outside one's control were associated with the sense that poverty was the result of societal or structural causes.

==== Political ideology and attributions for poverty ====
There is evidence for associations between political ideology and attributions for poverty. Support for welfare policies, which is associated with more progressive political ideology, was positively associated with situational attributions for poverty and negatively associated with individualistic views. On the other hand, conservative ideology was linked to less favorable opinions, less empathy, and more dislike of the welfare client than people with more liberal views. Individuals with more societal determinations of poverty were less favorable towards politically conservative approaches to addressing poverty. In sociological studies, researchers have identified strong relationships between assigning blame on individuals who are poor for their disadvantage and the belief that welfare programs are overfunded. Participants' self reported ratings of conservatism were associated with support for an individualistic perspective on the causes of poverty, as well as the controllability of poverty, the amount of blame associated towards those who were in conditions of poverty, and anger felt towards individuals in poverty. The same investigation revealed that conservatism was negatively correlated with a sense of pity towards people in poverty and a lower tendency to have prosocial intentions to help those in poverty.

=== Motivations in attributions for poverty ===
People are motivated to form attributions that are consistent with perceptions of the world. One consistency is based in the just world fallacy, in which people have a need to believe that the world is an orderly place, where people always get what they deserve eventually. This belief affects a person's reaction to the suffering of others, where people tend to devalue those that appear to be suffering, primarily to fulfill this belief that people ultimately get the outcome in life that they deserve. Additional research contributes to these motivated attributions for poverty, identifying that just world beliefs are associated with negative attitudes towards people in poverty. American societal values, and the belief in the American Dream, are based in meritocracy, or the belief that people are rewarded for their merit. Evidence from this area of work highlights attributions for poverty among individuals who face poverty or are otherwise marginalized in society. In controlled studies, individuals from disadvantaged groups that considered meritocratic values justified the disadvantage that they faced both in their personal lives and for their groups by noting a decreased perception of discrimination and increase in self and own-group stereotyping.

=== Experimental evidence ===
There is evidence that attributions for poverty are malleable. There have been experimental manipulations aimed at shifting attributions from dispositional to situational when considering the drivers of poverty. Some successful manipulations include writing exercises where individuals listed reasons why someone may be in poverty but does not deserve to be. Another experimental manipulation that shifted attributions from individual to situational involved simulations of poverty using the online game called SPENT, where participants must make a series of decisions on a very tight budget. In these experiments, participants with greater situational attributions for poverty were more likely to support egalitarian policy and wealth redistribution policy in the United States than participants with more dispositional attributions for poverty.

== Implications ==
Attributions for poverty are associated with tendencies to help those in poverty and to support policies related to addressing poverty. The perception that the cause of a person's need is due to controllable factors leads to neglect, while the perception of uncontrollable causes of need leads to feelings of pity and an increased tendency to offer help. Relatedly, people who were randomly assigned to a condition that induced situational attributions for poverty were more supportive of egalitarian policy positions and of wealth redistribution in the U.S. when compared with people who were assigned to a condition that induced individual attributions for poverty. There are individual, societal, and situational factors that inform perceptions about poverty, and these perceptions affect behaviors.

== See also ==
- Theories of poverty
