= Causes of poverty =

The causes of poverty may vary with respect to nation, region, and in comparison with other countries at the global level. Philosophical perspectives and especially historical perspectives, including some factors at a micro and macro level can be considered in understanding these causes.

== Background ==
Poverty is a multifaceted issue that is caused by a combination of economic, environmental, social, and political factors. Behavioral, structural, and political theories help explain poverty's persistence, while philosophical and historical perspectives, including both micro and macro-level factors, provide additional insights. Moreover, poverty can be understood in terms of absolute and relative measures.

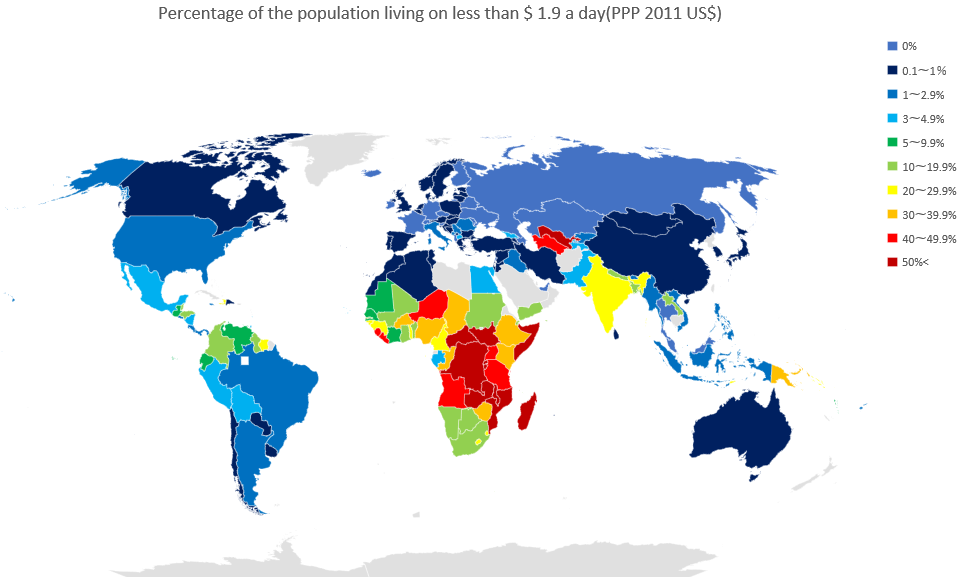
Percentage of the population living on less than US$1.90 a day (PPP 2011)

== Theories on the causes of poverty ==
There are three main theories on the causes of poverty:

- Behavioral Theories: Focus on individual behaviors driven by incentives and culture.
- Structural Theories: Emphasize demographic and labor market contexts, which influence both behavior and poverty.
- Political Theories: Argue that power and institutions shape policy, which in turn causes poverty and influences the relationship between behavior and poverty.

== Absolute and relative poverty ==
Absolute poverty is defined as a lack of basic necessities based on a set income level. According to World Bank guidelines, people living on less than $2.15 a day are considered to be living in extreme poverty. This generally applies to low-income countries. For lower-middle-income countries, the threshold is $3.20 a day, and for upper-middle-income countries, it is $5.50 a day. These standards account for economic differences, as a poor household in a wealthy region is more privileged than one in a deprived area. Therefore, discussions about poverty in advanced economies must consider that absolute poverty might not be directly applicable to people in that economy.

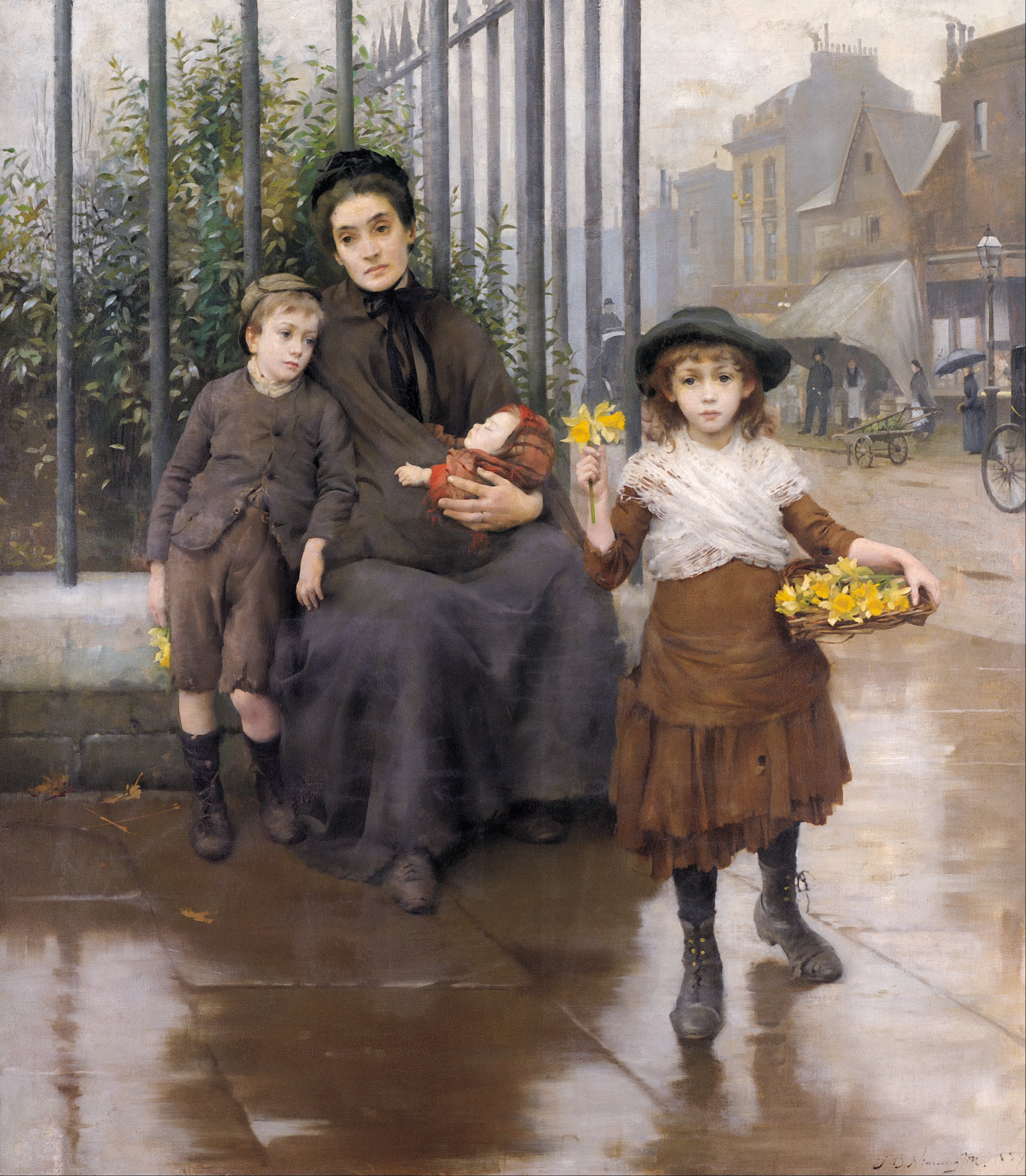
Thomas B. Kennington – The pinch of poverty

Relative poverty refers to individuals or entities that do not meet minimum standards compared to others in the same area, place, and time. Poorer economies can experience both absolute and relative poverty, while relative poverty is more common in advanced economies.

== Economic causes ==
High unemployment, low wages, and economic inequality are key economic drivers of poverty. Unemployment and low wages create financial instability, while economic inequality hinders access to essential services and limits social mobility.

== Social causes ==
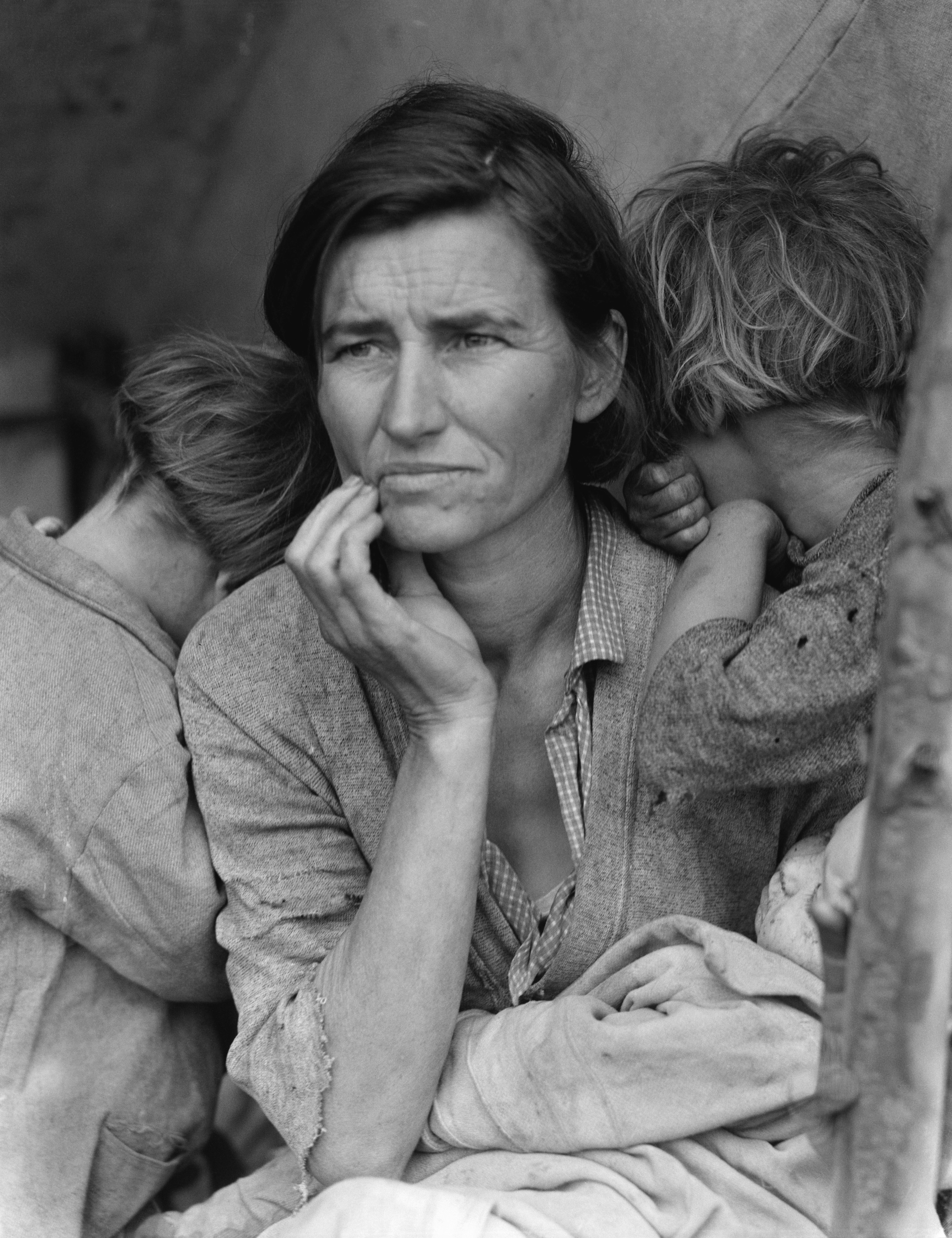
Woman during the Great Depression in the United States

Limited access to quality education, systemic discrimination, and single-parent households contribute to poverty. Education disparities and discrimination restrict opportunities, and single-parent households often struggle with economic challenges.

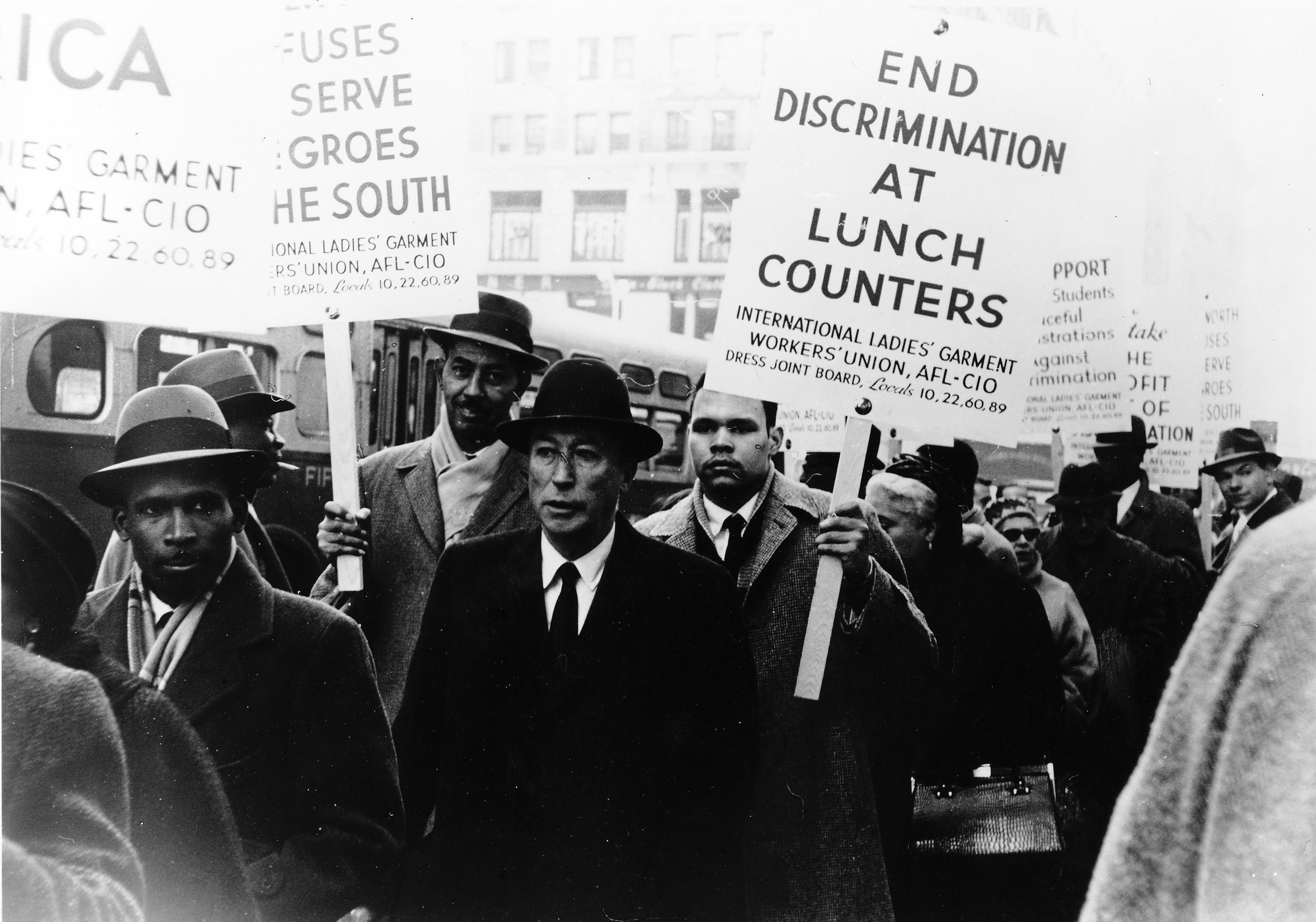
Picketers, including Charles Zimmerman, carry signs such as "End Discrimination at Lunch Counters"

== Political causes ==
Ineffective government policies, corruption, and armed conflicts exacerbate poverty. Poor social welfare policies and corruption hinder economic development, while wars disrupt economies and displace populations.

== Environmental causes ==
Natural disasters and climate change have long-term impacts on communities, leading to displacement and food insecurity. These environmental challenges contribute significantly to poverty.

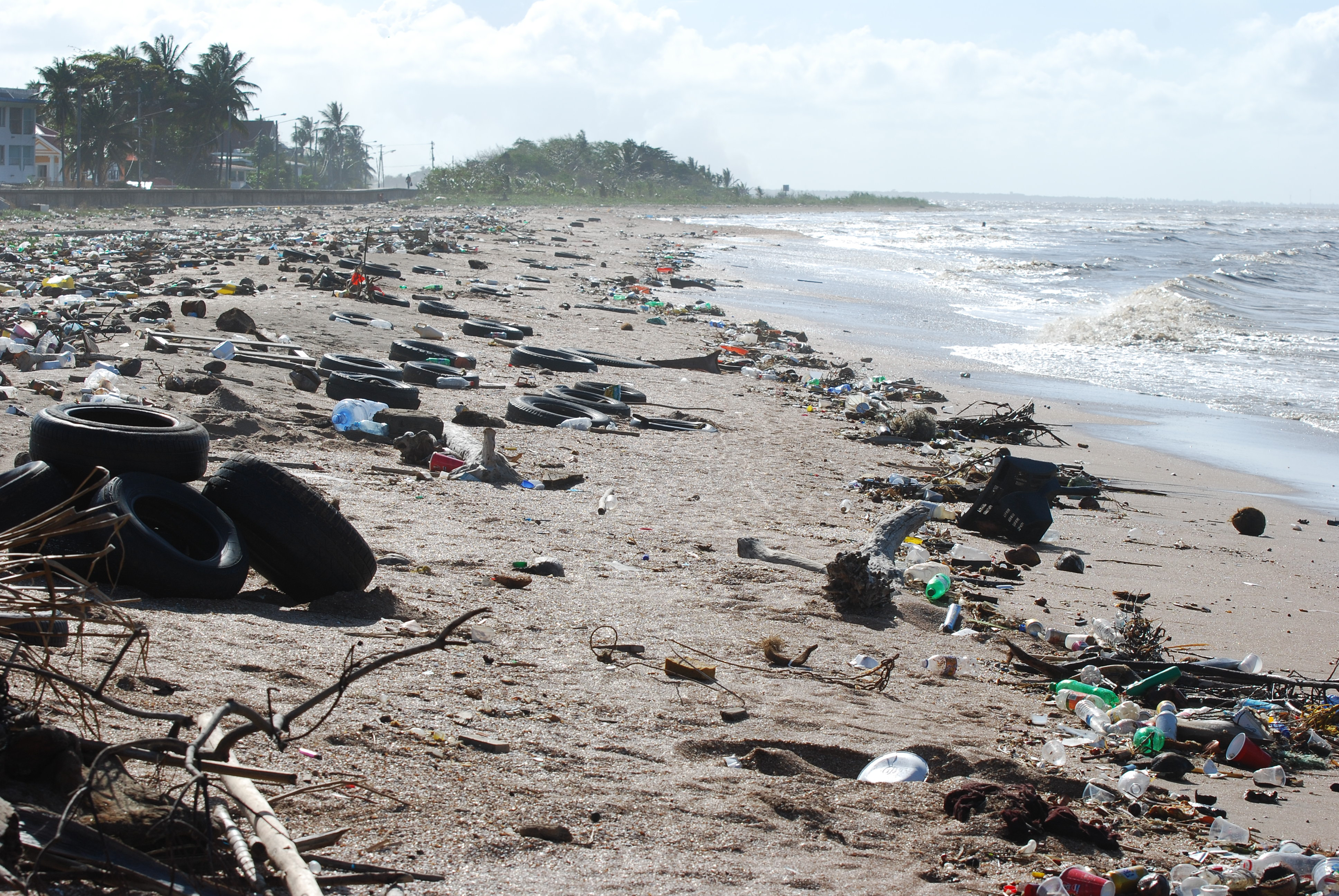
Litter

== Philosophical perspectives ==
- Socialist perspective: the socialist perspective attributes poverty to the ill-distribution of capital, wealth and resources that favor the interests of the "wealthy elite" or the "financial aristocracy" versus the community at large. The socialist tradition calls for the re-distribution of wealth as the solution to poverty. In essence, the "major levers of the economy" must be de-privatized and allocated to the working community-class that will adequately represent "the interests of ordinary people, rather than [those of] the wealthy elite." Marxists believe the structural nature of society (which is the cause of poverty) has to be changed to remedy poverty in society. Conversely, critics to this perspective, like Milton Friedman postulated that under the socialist perspective, the suppression of individual rights and that of a free-market economy can result in political absolutism and authoritarianism.
- Neoliberal perspective: the neoliberal perspective attributes poverty to centralization of free markets, sole government ownership of business enterprise, and de-capitalization – a system in which capital, wealth, and resources are at the sole discretion of government versus the individual. In the context of neoliberalism, a delicate balance between government and the economy is achieved. The private sector plays a key role in driving profit generation, leading to objective changes, more perceived efficiency, and innovation. Simultaneously, the government ensures a competitive and responsible marketplace wherein economic activity can thrive. From this perspective, private investments in infrastructure can combat poverty both in the present and the future. However, only $6 billion of private infrastructure investment was directed toward the world's poorest economies between 2010 and 2019, representing about 1% of the total $1.1 trillion invested during that period. This occurred during a historic era of erratic monetary policy, with central banks injecting liquidity into global markets. Since 2021, there have been concerted efforts to promote private investment in infrastructure projects in low-income economies.

See other considerations below

== Micro and macro-level causes ==
- Micro level: Some major causes of poverty, at this level, include the inability of poor households to invest in property, increased cost of living, fewer job or work opportunities, and limited access to credit.

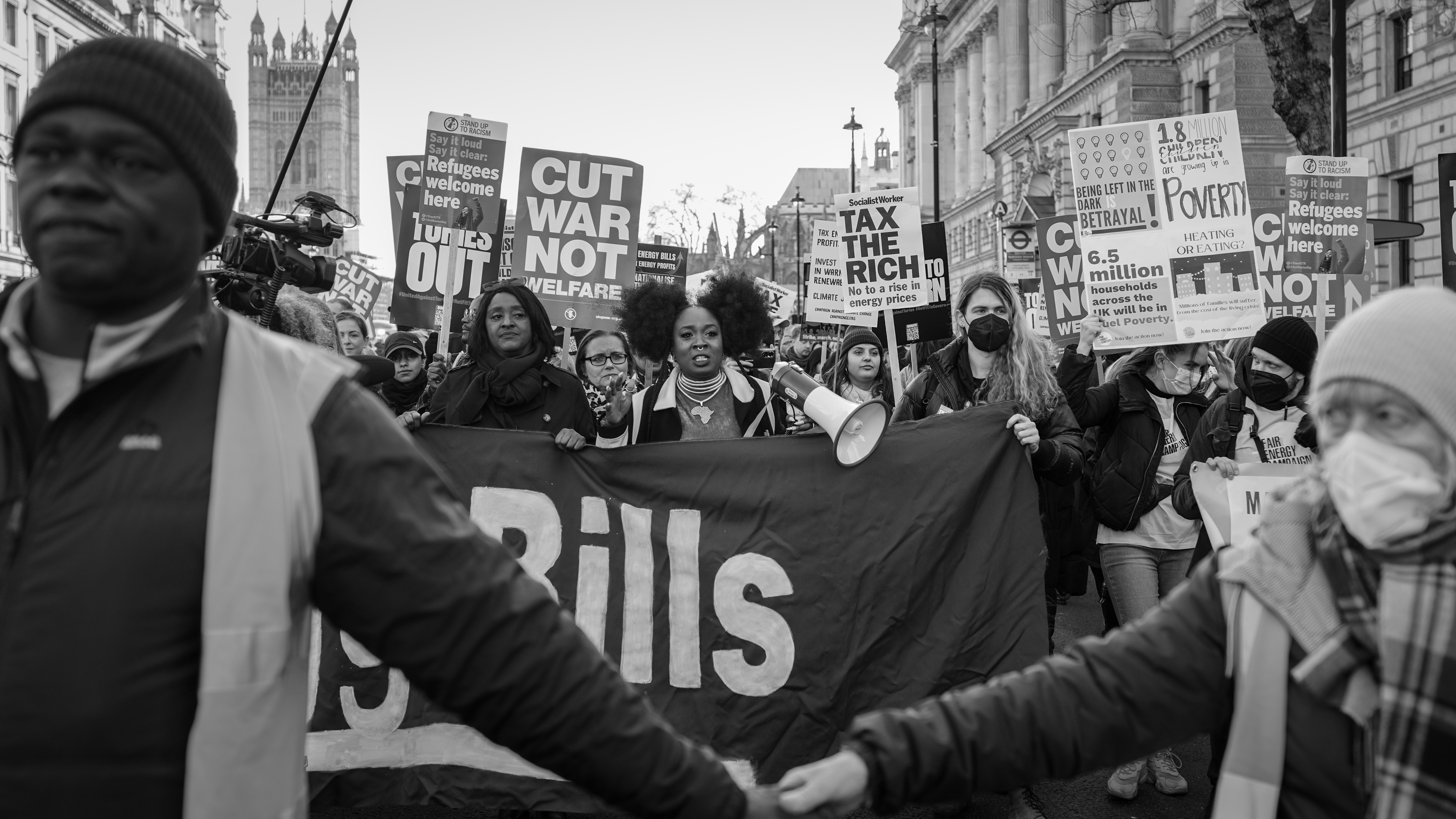
Cost of living protest in London – 12 February 2022

- Macro level: Factors such as colonialism and its after-effects contribute to poverty. Economists Daron Acemoglu and James A. Robinson maintain that poverty is associated with colonialism. Likewise, economic anthropologist Jason Hickel and Dylan Sullivan posit that it was the expansion of colonialism and the bulldozing of regions into the emerging capitalist world system starting in the late 15th and early 16th centuries that created "periods of severe social and economic dislocation" which resulted in wages crashing to subsistence levels, rising mortality rates and the proliferation of famines. The effects of colonialism left behind institutions that were new, alien and unsustainable. The lack of continuity in these foreign institutions, left entirely in the untrained hands of the prior colonized populace, tended to generate poverty in the communities.

== Additional causes of poverty ==
- Excessive debt: On a micro level, excessive individual debt can cause poverty as people without resources borrow more to live within or outside their financial means. On a macro or national level, unfavorable terms of debt repayment can burden poorer economies.
- Overpopulation: Can strain limited resources and lead to environmental degradation.
- Inadequate food and water access: Limited access to food and clean water can drain resources and exacerbate poverty.
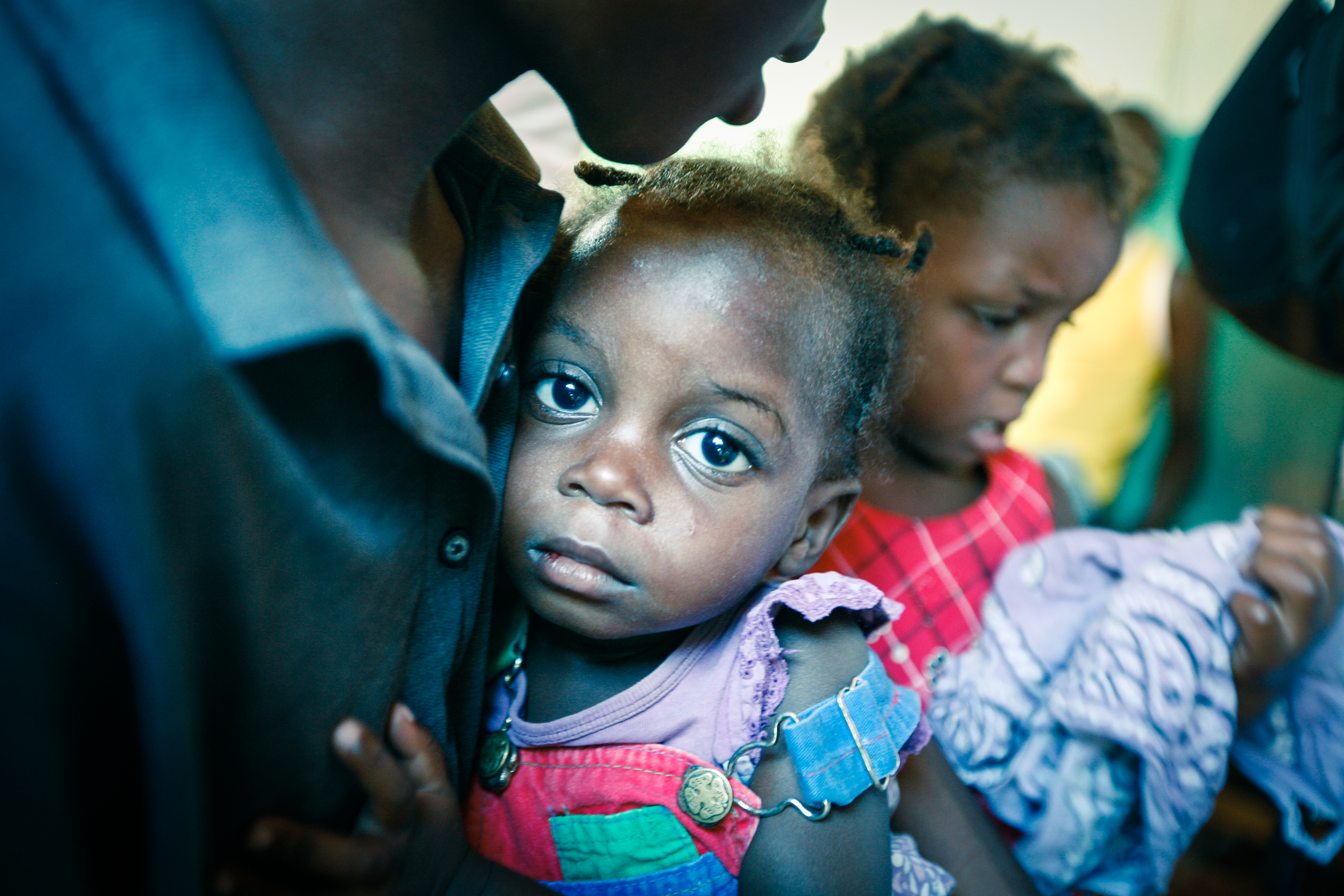
  Eyes of Hunger (8512780714)
- Healthcare access: poor or limited access to healthcare leads to decreased productivity and greater poverty.

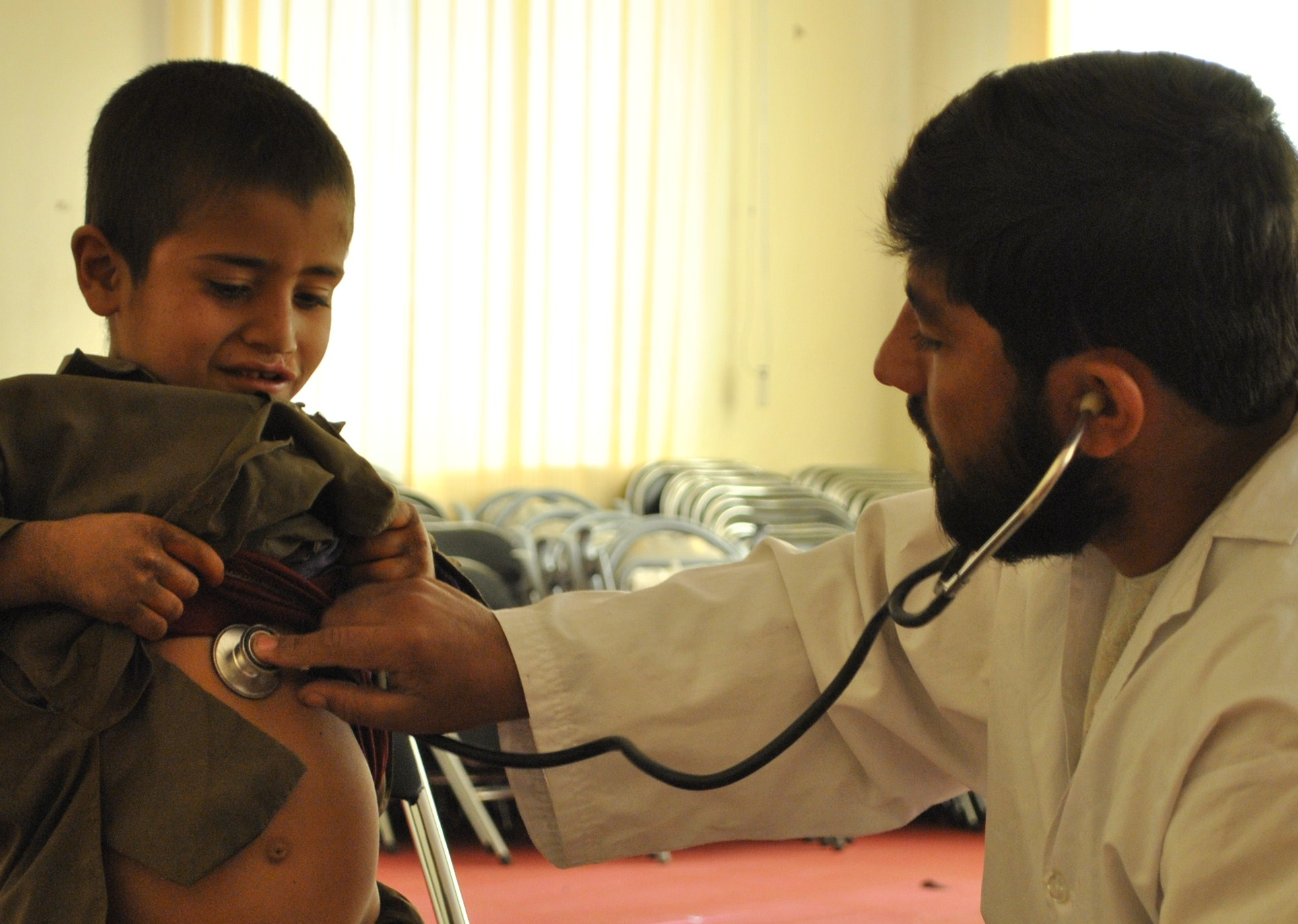
Medical care in Afghanistan

- Unequal distribution of resources – disparities in the distribution of resources causes systemic poverty while those with more resources get wealthier and better access to services.

== Other considerations ==
Several scholars have linked mass incarceration of the poor in the United States with the rise of neoliberalism. Sociologist Loïc Wacquant and Marxist economic geographer David Harvey have argued that the criminalization of poverty and mass incarceration is a neoliberal policy for dealing with social instability among economically marginalized populations. According to Wacquant, this situation follows the implementation of other neoliberal policies, which have allowed for the retrenchment of the social welfare state and the rise of punitive workfare, whilst increasing gentrification of urban areas, privatization of public functions, the shrinking of collective protections for the working class via economic deregulation and the rise of underpaid, precarious wage labor.

== Major causes of poverty, by country ==
Various countries where specific causes of poverty have been assessed include (listed alphabetically):

=== Bangladesh ===
Some notable causes of poverty which Bangladesh is fighting against include remnants of inequality, burdened healthcare costs, poor governance at multiple levels, inadequate sanitation, and limited access to safe drinking water. Bangladesh has made some strides in eradicating poverty through poverty reduction strategies (PRS). As a result of those strategies, some critical markers indicative of poverty show promise, such as decreased child mortality, promoted gender parity, practiced micro-credit, and a vibrant non-governmental sector in place.

=== Canada ===
Statistics Canada reported in 2013 that high-risk groups for poverty in Canada include "people with activity limitations (physical or mental disability), singles (unattached individuals), persons in lone-parent families, people with less than a high school education and minorities who are immigrants."

Activist group Canada Without Poverty, referencing Statistics Canada, identifies that 1 in 7 individuals or 4.9 million persons in the nation are experiencing poverty.

=== China ===
As of 2024, China is considered to be an upper-middle-income country having eradicated extreme poverty in 2020. However, approximately 17 percent of the population was living on less than $6.85 per day (in 2017 PPP terms) which is what the World Bank considered the Upper-Middle-Income poverty line in 2021.

The causes of poverty in China revolve around:

- "income inequality" with persistent "low paid labor" jobs
- a rapidly aging labor force and a rising proportion of the rural poor
- lack of a pension system for the rural elderly.
- economic stagnation—in which low cost, "low end" manufacturing has plateaued (and a "new growth model" is long overdue)
- diminishing returns in investment vehicles
- slowing in productivity

=== Haiti ===
Haiti, regarded as "the poorest country in the Western Hemisphere", has a GDP (per capita) of about US$797, as reported in 2019. Greater than 6 million Haitians reportedly live on less than US$2.41 per day, and more than 2.5 million on US$1.12 per day.

The causes of poverty in Haiti have been rooted in "institutional and political instability" that chronically suffocate the growth of its social and economic sectors.

Apart from the 2021 COVID-19 pandemic that has affected it (both politically and economically), particularly the poor and most vulnerable, Haiti has other natural elements such as hurricanes and earthquakes that have rendered some damage to its fragile infrastructure and limited economic resources. Deforestation has also exacerbated the effects of storms, floods and hurricanes.

Despite this depiction, the World Bank has committed financial resources (in the tune of over US$834.41 million—in October 2020) to resuscitate Haiti's economy. The International Finance Corporation (IFC) has also rendered support in revitalizing Haiti's economy in the areas of "energy, beverage [production], garment manufacturing, financial markets, and hospitality." Other resources from donors include over US$40 million for economic remedy in the aftermath of the COVID-19 pandemic.

Thus, overall, promising results are being observed in the sectors of education, health, better access to safe drinking water, energy production, agriculture and transport.

=== Moldova ===
Once part of the USSR, Moldova is regarded as the poorest country in Europe, with a reported "GDP per capita of $2,289". One cited reason for Moldova's poverty is an increase in inequality, with the growing increase in urban and rural poverty.

=== Nigeria ===
Nigeria is the most populated African nation with 42.54% of the population falling within the age group of 0 -14. Despite the population growth and its status as an OPEC member, Nigeria has 51% of the population living in extreme poverty, with some people living on as little as $1.90 a day.

=== Philippines ===
From 1621 to 1901, food prices increased due to a change in the policies of commodity pricing which—in turn—increased the poverty rate. From 1960 to 2009, slow economic growth has contributed to the persistence of poverty and has also contributed to the non-poor becoming poor. Although poverty has been reduced overall, the inequality of poverty has increased, according to the Asian Development Bank.

=== Russia ===
According to Russia's State Statistics Service (Rosstat), Russia's poverty statistics equaled 14.3%, or 20.9 million people versus 13.9%, or 20.4 million people, in the first three months of 2018.

The causes of poverty in Russia are complex: a shrinking economy, inflation, falling oil prices and in a rise in "consumer prices". High transportation costs, including the cost of logistics, and the perception of inequality have hindered growth in investments, which, in turn, has generated a cycle of poverty.

Vladimir Putin is promoting a program aims to reduce poverty in the face of economic difficulties due to international sanctions.

=== South Africa ===
Despite South Africa being ranked 38th in the "ranking of the richest countries with net financial assets per capita of $8,385 (R140,200)", the causes of poverty in South Africa are multi-faceted. Major causes of poverty, precipitated by a history of apartheid, involve disparities in the distribution of resources, coupled with poor educational opportunities. Non-whites have also had poor access to job opportunities and health care—known catalysts in the generation and cycle of poverty. In response to these challenges, South Africa initiated the so-called Expanded Public Works Programme (EPWP) to participate in job creation and promoting equitable policies in employment practices. The government has also endeavored to improve schools, provide health care for the poor, children (ages 6 and below) and pregnant women.

=== United States ===
The United States economy, complex and highly developed, is the largest global economy with the sixth highest per capita GDP (PPP) and about 20% of the total global output. The economy comprises dominant production sectors such as technology, financial services, healthcare, and retail. More than 20% of companies on the Fortune Global 500 originate from the United States.

The poverty rate in the United States, in 2019, was 10.5 percent, the reported lowest reported since 1959. The poverty rate varies across racial lines and was reported to have reached "historic lows in 2019". For black Americans, the rate was about 18.8%; for white Americans (non-Hispanic), the rate was 7.3% and for Hispanics, it was 15.7%. For Asians, the rate was 7.3%, "the lowest on record".

Specifically, the poverty rate, in 2019, was most notable in the younger age category of 18 to 24 years old, of which 17.1% were males versus 21.35% females. Children were, as a group, most affected by poverty between the period, 1990 and 2018. Between 2000 and 2010, the poverty rate increased. A dip of 14.4% was later noted in 2019. People of ages 65 to 74 had the lowest poverty rate.

The number of people living in relative poverty, across the country, tends to vary from state to state, e.g. in California (in 2018), 4.66 million people lived in poverty versus in Minnesota with about 456,000 people that lived in poverty.

The causes of relative poverty in the US are complex and revolve around the following:

- Societal inequity with associated disparities in pay, skills, opportunities and employment.
- Inequitable distribution of resources.
- Labor market issues – which adversely impact wages, skills and benefits.
- Limited access to educational opportunities – which impacts communities with low skilled labor. Adults without a high school diploma or college degree and/or marketable skills end up earning less.
- Intermingled social and demographic factors – which create unsustainable family structures and barriers, viz. single headed families with children and those with an unemployed head of household tend to gravitate towards less pay and higher rate of poverty.
- Policies and practices – that adversely impact health, food security and crime.

== Trends ==
=== COVID-19 2020 ===
According to the World Bank, in 2015, approximately 734 million people, equating to 10 percent of the world's population, survived on less than $1.90 a day—versus 1.9 billion people in 1990 (equating to about 36 percent of the world's population).

The aforementioned progress made will be (and has been) reversed by the current global COVID-19 pandemic crisis, which is significantly affecting national, regional and global economies through unemployment, layoffs, poor delivery of essential goods and services as well as disruptions in the education and health sectors. One fact is clear: the effects of COVID-19 will impact the poor and poor economies to a disproportionately high degree, and causing more people to become poor.

In retrospect, countries, all over the world, injected vast monetary resources into social programs to mitigate the financial woes associated with the pandemic.

Advanced economies utilized almost 28 percent of their GDP to keep their communities and others beyond them afloat. Similarly, middle income economies spent 7% of their GDP while developing economies spent 2% of their GDP for the upkeep of their own communities. These measures, ultimately, protected many families and communities from plunging into poverty.

The full impact of COVID-19 on poverty, in countries world-wide, is expected to be fully discerned in a period of 12 to 24 months, from 2021.

Projections reveal that the long-term effects of COVID-19 will likely expand poverty in countries with the following defining parameters:

1. Middle income economies
2. Developing economies
3. Conflict ridden regions with fragile governance

It is projected that by 2030, nine countries with an expanded segment of the "extreme poor" will be in Africa, with Burundi and North Korea tied together in tenth place. A number of middle-income economies will likely see an increased incidence of poverty in their nations as well. Notwithstanding, these projected trends are reversible with the creation of social programs that can be utilized to protect the most vulnerable in each community nation.

== See also ==
- Causes of income inequality
- Culture of poverty
- Cycle of poverty
- Involuntary unemployment
- Poverty reduction
- Theories of poverty
