= Criminalization of poverty =

The criminalization of poverty refers to the systemic practices and policies that disproportionately penalize individuals for behaviors associated with their economic status. This phenomenon manifests through various legal and social mechanisms that enforce penalties on those who are unable to meet basic needs due to poverty, leading to a cycle of criminalization and further marginalization. Examples include fines and fees that the person is unable to pay, anti-homelessness laws and actions, and interconnections between welfare and criminal law.

== In the United States ==
In 2024, the United States Supreme Court held in City of Grants Pass v. Johnson that an ordinances that criminalized camping on public property was constitutional.

In 2025, the Fremont, California city council voted to criminalize ‘aiding’ and ‘abetting’ homeless camps. The ordinance was later revised removing the clause that could have punished those “aiding and abetting” encampments.

=== Fees and Fines ===
Fines in the justice system are frequently understood as the consequences for offenses such as minor traffic violations or in addition to short prison sentences. Fees are the payments for access to certain services such as a phone call while in custody or for a court reporter at a hearing. Some states use fees to fund state programs, such as the Fish and Game Preservation Fund in California. If these fines and fees are not able to be paid immediately, the cost increases through the imposition of interest and late payment fees. If these debts go unpaid for long enough, many states are able to jail those who owe money. In 2019, more than half of the people arrested and booked made less than $10,000 a year individually, meaning those with the least amount of money are fined more often.

== See also ==
- Debtors' prison
- Cycle of poverty
- Poverty industry
- Decriminalization
- Genocide
