= Poverty in Moldova =

Moldova is considered one of the poorest countries in Europe despite substantial progress. According to the UN Development Program's 2016 report, 9.6% of the population was living in absolute national poverty (as defined by the National Bureau of Statistics [NBS]) and the World Bank reports that 0.2% and 0.1% of the population live at $1.90 a day in 2016 and 2017 respectively. Furthermore, the percentage of the population that was living below the national poverty line was 30.2 in 2006 and 9.6 in 2015. In 2012, Moldova received 0.004 as its Multidimensional poverty index (MPI).

== Causes ==
A major concern of the state is that a lot of specialized labour is migrating out of the country. Due to the low number of opportunities for post-secondary graduates in sectors aside from farming, many are looking for employment outside the country. By some estimates, a quarter of the population live and work abroad, 11th highest in the world. Although many send remittances back home, several studies show that international remittances can contribute little to economic development and only alleviate extreme poverty and help raise the standard of living for remittance-receiving household in the short and medium run.

There are additional factors that contribute to poverty in Moldova:

- Lack of large-scale industrialization.
- Huge population boom between 1920s until the mid 1980s.
- Rural over-population led to lower bargaining power of labour.
- Unproductive agriculture due to small farm size and low foodgrain yields.
- Subsequent food insecurity.
- Economic collapse during the transition to market economy.
- The large share of agriculture sector in the GDP.
- Trade barriers with neighbouring Ukraine.
- Errors in social policy.
- Lack of good educational infrastructure meant it could not bypass traditional industrialization and launch into the knowledge economy revolution like India or Turkey.
- For the same reason as above, lack of white collar workforce that could seek work in more prosperous countries and send back remittances, as happened in the case of Hungary, Poland, and Estonia.

== Rural and urban poverty ==
The majority of the population that is employed in the agricultural sector are contract employees. In 2014, the average monthly salary for these employees is MDL 2773.9 which is 33.5% lower than the national average. Rural workers from agricultural sectors are more impacted by poverty risk than workers from non-agricultural sectors. About a quarter (25.5%) of households with incomes from agricultural work and 6.8% of households with non-agricultural incomes are subject to poverty risks. Therefore, increases in employment in agriculture in rural areas alone cannot solve the issue of poverty in villages.

Absolute poverty rate (%)
Location	2006	2009	2015
Rural	34.1	36.3	14.5
Urban	24.8	12.6	3.1
Total	30.2	26.3	9.6

== National/racial/ethnic minorities ==
Roma continued to be one of the most vulnerable minority groups in the country and faced a higher risk of marginalization, under-representation in political decision making, illiteracy, and social prejudice. Roma had lower levels of education, more limited access to health care, and higher rates of unemployment than the general population. Romani women were particularly vulnerable to social exclusion and discrimination.

Authorities lacked an effective mechanism to address vulnerable families whose children did not attend school. Approximately 60 percent of Romani families lived in rural areas. Some Romani communities lacked running water, sanitation facilities, and heating. Other problems facing Roma include lack of emergency health-care services in secluded settlements, unfair or arbitrary treatment by health practitioners, lower rates of health insurance coverage, and discrimination in the job market. According to the most recent statistics, only 21 percent of Roma were actively employed. Throughout the year, Roma groups reported being denied service at restaurants in Soroca and Riscani.

Latin-script schools in Transnistria continued to be a matter of dispute between the Moldovan authorities and the de facto Transnistrian authorities, although a formal agreement was signed to reduce the rent paid by Moldovan authorities operating Latin-script schools in Transnistria.

== Child poverty ==
Child poverty is one of the most important problems in Moldova. Children living in rural areas have an extremely high risk of poverty especially if the family has three or more children. Children in poor households have a high risk of educational underachievement and a lacking access to the healthcare services.
