= Kill line =

Chinese term describing poverty in the United States

Kill line or death line (simplified Chinese: 斩杀线; traditional Chinese: 斬殺線; pinyin: Zhǎnshāxiàn) is a Chinese Internet slang term used in online discourse to describe perceived poverty and economic vulnerability in the United States. The term expresses that once someone in the United States encounters significant financial hardship, their ability to recover becomes difficult, and they could possibly become homeless or lose their social status. Some people argue that the phrase reflects a broader modern economic phenomenon, while others describe it as a way to deflect attention from poverty and social welfare-related issues within China.

== Background ==
The term "kill line" originates from role-playing games (RPGs) and multiplayer online battle arena (MOBA) games, referring to a threshold at which a character can be eliminated with single attack once their health falls below a certain level. In gaming contexts, the concept is used to predict elimination opportunities and guide tactical decisions.

In 2025, a Bilibili user known as Squid King (斯奎奇大王) uploaded a five-hour video documenting his observation of life in the United States. The video portrays members of the middle and working classes struggling with high living expenses and limited savings, leaving them vulnerable to financial shocks. The video showed children begging for food from door to door on a cold Halloween night, delivery workers going hungry because of their meager wages, and injured workers being turned away from hospitals because they couldn't afford medical bills.

In the video, Squid King attributes these conditions in part to the U.S. credit scoring system, suggesting that there is a "passing grade" in this system. People above the "passing grade" can maintain a decent life and enjoy the prosperity of a capitalist society, but once they fall below the "passing grade", it is extremely difficult for them to recover, and they will continue to be trapped in poverty.

== Reception and commentary ==
=== Reaction from China ===
"Kill line" has generated discussion on Chinese-language internet platforms. The Chinese news website Guancha has compared the concept to the ALICE threshold used in the United States, suggesting similarities between the two frameworks.

Several Chinese state-affiliated media outlets and commentators have framed the "kill line" narrative as evidence of perceived systematic weakness in American capitalism. China's Farmers' Daily newspaper highlighted China's social safety net policies, including poverty alleviation programs, describing them as comprehensive and contrasting them with conditions depicted in discussions of the "kill line". Wang Zhe (王哲), a researcher at the China Institutes of Contemporary International Relations, stated that the term reflects what he characterized as the influence of Social Darwinist ideas in the United States. Xinhua News Agency argued that the discourse surrounding the "kill line" illustrates shortcomings in the U.S. social welfare system and limitation on what it described as the "right to development."

Discussion of the term has also intersected with debates among Chinese netizens about domestic social issues. Online commentary has drawn parallels between the "kill line" and topics such as employment discrimination against workers over the age of 35, China's zero-COVID policy, and other socio-economic pressures. In some instances, the phrase has been used metaphorically to describe political developments, including commentary referring to the arrest of Zhang Youxia as a "kill line" in a power struggle.

BBC News published a report on 2 February 2026 which observed that some Chinese netizens invoke the concept of the "kill line" in discussions of social issues within China, describing the phenomenon as a form of rhetorical displacement. Discussion of the "kill line" with regarding to domestic issues in China is widely censored.

=== Reaction from the United States ===
On 26 December 2025, Newsweek reported on the virality of the "kill line" discourse in China. In addition to citing a report written by PNC Bank, the magazine noted that Chinese state media outlets characterized capitalism in the United States as "chaotic and brutal" in their coverage of the topic.

An article published by The New York Times by Yuan Li on 13 January 2026 described the online attention surrounding the "kill line" as "obsessive", characterizing it as a recurring case where foreign social problems are amplified amid domestic concerns. The report stated that Chinese authorities and state-linked media had promoted the narrative at a time of heightened discussion of economic insecurity within China. In the report, she said: "The depiction of the United States as a place where economic hardship is deep and widespread has been a go-to of official Chinese messaging for years. But the use of the 'kill line' phrasing and imagery is new. The power is in the simplicity of what it describes: an abrupt threshold where misery begins and a happy life is irreversibly lost. The narrative is meant to offer China's people emotional relief while attempting to deflect criticism of its leaders."

During a public session of the World Economic Forum on 20 January 2026, Scott Bessent, then United States Secretary of the Treasury, was asked by Yuyuan Tantian, a social media account affiliated with China Central Television, whether a "kill line" existed in the United States. Bessent responded that he did not understand the term but stated that the administration was working to reduce inflation and referenced tax cuts under the One Big Beautiful Bill Act (OBBBA).

The newspaper Lianhe Zaobao subsequently quoted a tax expert who argued that the OBBBA's tax reductions would have little impact on low-income earners and therefore would be unlikely to address concerns described by proponents of the "kill line" narrative.

=== Other reactions ===
A column in Lianhe Zaobao observed that some commentators in China used the "kill line" discourse to argue that China's socio-economic system is superior to that of the United States. The column also quoted Wang Jiangyu, a professor of City University of Hong Kong, who stated that economic vulnerability is not unique to any one country. He used the example of how a serious illness in China, causing long-term financial hardship, could lead to a struggle to recover. Daniel Cheng of Jacobin wrote that the "kill line" and the "Chinamaxxing" memes were born of "two societies that face the same crises of alienation, unemployment, and a weak welfare state."

Academic Henry Gao of the SMU Yong Pung How School of Law suggested that official promotion of the "kill line" is an attempt to distract from domestic social issues, while Gan Liyi of the Nanyang Technological University noted that the narrative is a reflection of the Chinese government viewing social issues, including poverty and social security, as part of its broader security concerns in times of increasing China-U.S. strategic competition. Chinese legal blogger Li Yuchen wrote in a subsequently-censored essay that the "kill line" is part of an online nationalist discourse that has become lucrative to some influencers and is a "cheap dose of patriotic aphrodisiac." Lizzi Lee of the Asia Society Policy Institute's Center for China Analysis noted that the debates reflect a service-cost problem between the two countries, where costs for labor-intensive services in the United States, including healthcare and education, have increased and the costs can pile up at once, while China's lower service costs and informal social structures, including family support, can provide some form of basic buffering, although its social welfare system is much less developed.

A column for Radio Taiwan International, said that individuals in China facing severe personal crises may experience significant economic decline, sometimes forcing them to return to their hometowns or rely on loans. He argued that economic difficulties in China could be more severe in some cases than what is portrayed as the "kill line" in the United States. On 20 January 2026, Hsu Chuan, a Taiwan-based commentator, similarly noted that although the phrase "kill line" appears to be a recent neologism, it refers to structural social and economic issues that have been debated for decades.

International media outlets have also addressed the term. Financial Times and The Economist discussed the phenomenon, with The Economist suggesting that social hardship in the United States may be more openly debated than similar challenges within China.

== See also ==
- Little Pink
- Precariat
- Tang ping
- United States affordability crisis
