= Minimum daily balance =

In banking, a minimum daily balance is the minimum balance that a banking institution requires account holders to have in their accounts each day in order to waive maintenance fees. This is distinct from the average daily balance, which is computed as the sum of daily balances in a billing period divided by the number of days.

Most checking account balances are measured by minimum daily balance. An account balance may drop below the required amount throughout a given day as long as the balance requirement is met at the end of the business day. For example: Joan has a checking account with a "$1,600 minimum daily balance." One day she makes purchases that drop her balance down to $1,300 but then deposits a $400 paycheck before the end of the day. The bank won’t charge her the service fee because her final balance that day is $1,700.
