= Theories of poverty =

Theories on the causes of poverty are the foundation upon which poverty reduction strategies are based.

While in developed nations poverty is often seen as either a personal or a structural defect, in developing nations the issue of poverty is more profound due to the lack of governmental funds. Some theories on poverty in the developing world focus on cultural characteristics as a retardant of further development. Other theories focus on social and political aspects that perpetuate poverty; perceptions of the poor have a significant impact on the design and execution of programs to alleviate poverty.

== Causes of poverty in the United States ==
=== Poverty as a personal failing ===
When it comes to poverty in the United States, there are two main lines of thought. The most common line of thought within the U.S. is that a person is poor because of personal traits. These traits in turn have caused the person to fail. Supposed traits range from personality characteristics, such as laziness, to educational levels. Despite this range, it is always viewed as the individual's personal failure not to climb out of poverty. This thought pattern stems from the idea of meritocracy and its entrenchment within U.S. thought. Meritocracy, according to Katherine S. Newman is "the view that those who are worthy are rewarded and those who fail to reap rewards must also lack self-worth." This does not mean that all followers of meritocracy believe that a person in poverty deserves their low standard of living. Rather the underlying ideas of personal failure show in the resistance to social and economic programs such as welfare; a poor individual's lack of prosperity shows a personal failure and should not be compensated (or justified) by the state.

=== Poverty as a structural failing ===
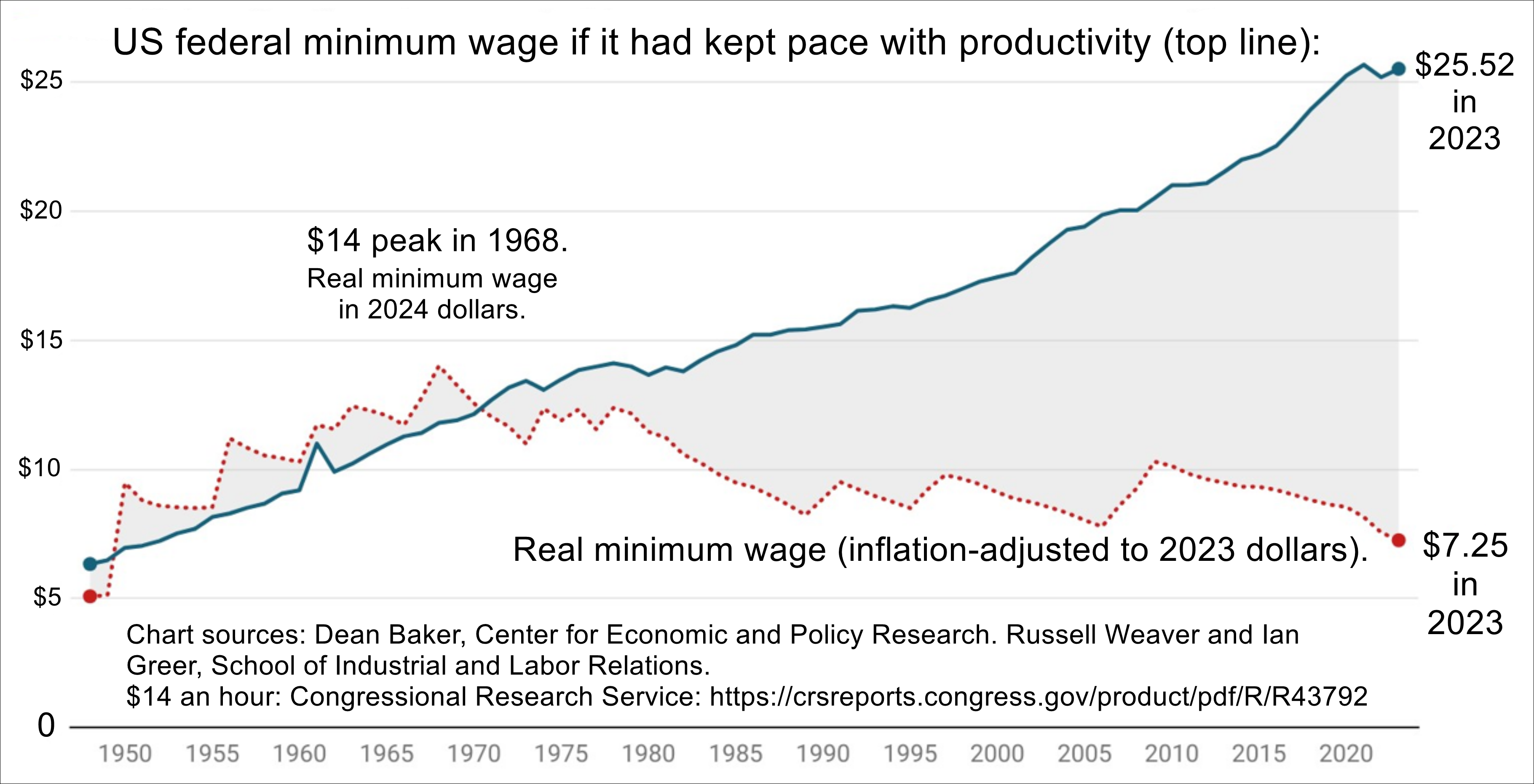
US federal minimum wage if it had kept pace with productivity. Also, the real minimum wage.

Rank, Yoon, and Hirschl (2003) present a contrary argument to the idea that personal failings are the cause of poverty. The argument presented is that poverty in the United States is the result of "failings at the structural level." Key social and economic structural failings which contribute heavily to poverty within the U.S. are identified in the article. The first is a failure of the job market to provide a proper number of jobs which pay enough to keep families out of poverty. Even if unemployment is low, the labor market may be saturated with low-paying, part-time work that lacks benefits (thus limiting the number of full-time, good paying jobs). Rank, Yoon and Hirschl examined the Survey of Income and Program Participation (SIPP), a longitudinal study on employment and income. Using the 1999 official poverty line of $17,029 for a family of four, it was found that 9.4% of persons working full-time and 14.9% of persons working at least part-time did not earn enough annually to keep them above the poverty line.

The investor, billionaire, and philanthropist Warren Buffett, one of the wealthiest people in the world, voiced in 2005 and once more in 2006 his view that his class, the "rich class", is waging class warfare on the rest of society. In 2005 Buffet said to CNN: "It's class warfare, my class is winning, but they shouldn't be." In a November 2006 interview in The New York Times, Buffett stated that "[t]here's class warfare all right, but it's my class, the rich class, that's making war, and we're winning."

One study showed that 29% of families in The United States could go six months or longer during a hardship with no income. Over 50% of respondents said around two months with no income and another 20% said they could not go longer than two weeks. Low minimum wage, combined with part-time jobs which offer no benefits, has contributed to the labor market's inability to produce enough jobs which can keep a family out of poverty is an example of an economic structural failure.

Rank, Yoon and Hirschl point to the minimal amount of social safety nets found within the U.S. as a social structural failure and a major contributor to poverty in the U.S. Other industrialized nations devote more resources to assisting the poor than the U.S. As a result of this difference poverty is reduced in nations which devote more to poverty reduction measure and programs. Rank et al. use a table to drive this point home. The table shows that in 1994, the actual rate of poverty (what the rate would be without government interventions) in the U.S. was 29%. When compared to actual rates in Canada (29%), Finland (33%), France (39%), Germany (29%), the Netherlands (30%), Norway (27%), Sweden (36%) and the United Kingdom (38%), the United States rate is low. But when government measures and programs are included, the rate of reduction in poverty in the United States is low (38%). Canada and the United Kingdom had the lowest reduction rates outside of the U.S. at 66%, while Sweden, Finland and Norway had reduction rates greater than 80%.

Redlining intentionally excluded black Americans from accumulating intergenerational wealth. The effects of this exclusion on black Americans' health continue to play out daily, generations later, in the same communities. This is evident currently in the disproportionate effects that COVID-19 has had on the same communities which the HOLC redlined in the 1930s. Research published in September 2020 overlaid maps of the highly affected COVID-19 areas with the HOLC maps, showing that those areas marked "risky" to lenders because they contained minority residents were the same neighborhoods most affected by COVID-19. The Centers for Disease Control (CDC) looks at inequities in the social determinants of health like concentrated poverty and healthcare access that are interrelated and influence health outcomes with regard to COVID-19 as well as quality of life in general for minority groups. The CDC points to discrimination within health care, education, criminal justice, housing, and finance, direct results of systematically subversive tactics like redlining which led to chronic and toxic stress that shaped social and economic factors for minority groups, increasing their risk for COVID-19. Healthcare access is similarly limited by factors like a lack of public transportation, child care, and communication and language barriers which result from the spatial and economic isolation of minority communities from redlining. Educational, income, and wealth gaps that result from this isolation mean that minority groups' limited access to the job market may force them to remain in fields that have a higher risk of exposure to the virus, without options to take time off. Finally, a direct result of redlining is the overcrowding of minority groups into neighborhoods that do not boast adequate housing to sustain burgeoning populations, leading to crowded conditions that make prevention strategies for COVID-19 nearly impossible to implement.

Additionally, filial responsibility laws are usually not enforced, resulting in parents of adult children remaining more impoverished than otherwise.

== Causes of poverty in developing nations ==
Shiva Kumar - The importance of MDGs in redefining what are the poverty drivers

=== Poverty as cultural characteristics ===
Development plays a central role to poverty reduction in third world countries. Some authors feel that the national mindset itself plays a role in the ability of a country to develop and to thus reduce poverty. Mariano Grondona (2000) outlines twenty "cultural factors" which, depending on the culture's view of each, can be indicators as to whether the cultural environment is favorable or resistant to development. In turn Lawrence E. Harrison (2000) identifies ten "values" which, like Grondona's factors, can be indicative of the nation's developmental environment. Finally, Stace Lindsay (2000) claims the differences between development-prone and development-resistant nations is attributed to mental models (which, like values, influence the decisions humans make). Mental models are also cultural creations. Grondona, Harrison and Lindsay all feel that without development-orientated values and mindsets, nations will find it difficult if not impossible to develop efficiently, and that some sort of cultural change will be needed in these nations in order to reduce poverty.

In "A Cultural Typology of Economic Development", from the book Culture Matters, Mariano Grondona claims development is a matter of decisions. These decisions, whether they are favorable to economic development or not, are made within the context of culture. All cultural values considered together create "value systems". These systems heavily influence the way decisions are made as well as the reactions and outcomes of said decisions. In the same book, Stace Lindsay's chapter claims the decisions individuals make are a result of mental models. These mental models influence all aspects of human action. Like Grondona's value systems, these mental models which dictate a nations stance toward development and hence its ability to deal with poverty.

Grondona presents two ideal value systems (mental models), one of which has values only favoring development, the other only with value which resist development. Real value systems fluctuate and fall somewhere between the two poles, but developed countries tend to bunch near one end, while undeveloped countries bunch near the other. Grondona goes on to identify twenty cultural factors on which the two value systems stand in opposition. These factors include such things as the dominant religion; the role of the individual in society; the value placed on work; concepts of wealth, competition, justice and time; and the role of education. In "Promoting Progressive Cultural Change", also from Culture Matters, Lawrence E. Harrison identifies values, like Grondona's factors, which differ between "progressive" cultures and "static" cultures. Religion, value of work, overall justice and time orientation are included in his list, but Harrison also adds frugality and community as important factors.

Stace Lindsay also presents "patterns of thought" which differ between nations that stand at opposite poles of the developmental scale. Lindsay focuses more on economic aspects such as the form of capital focused upon and market characteristics. Key themes which emerge from these lists as characteristic of developmental cultures are: trust in the individual with a fostering of individual strengths; the ability for free thinking in an open, safe environment; importance of questioning/innovation; law is supreme and holds the power; future orientated time frame with an emphasis on achievable, practical goals; meritocracy; an autonomous mindset within the larger world; strong work ethic is highly valued and rewarded; a microeconomic focus; and a value that is non-economic, but not anti-economic, which is always wanting. Characteristics of the ideal non-developmental value system are: suppression of the individual through control of information and censorship; present/past time orientation with emphasis on grandiose, often unachievable, goals; macroeconomic focus; access to leaders allowing for easier and greater corruption; unstable distribution of law and justice (family and its connections matter most); and a passive mindset within the larger world.

Grondona, Harrison, and Lindsay all feel that at least some aspects of development-resistant cultures need to change in order to allow under-developed nations (and cultural minorities within developed nations) to develop effectively. According to their argument, poverty is fueled by cultural characteristics within under-developed nations, and in order for poverty to be brought under control, said nations must move down the development path.

=== Poverty as a label ===
Various theorists believe the way poverty is approached, defined, and thus thought about, plays a role in its perpetuation. Maia Green (2006) explains that modern development literature tends to view poverty as agency filled. When poverty is prescribed agency, poverty becomes something that happens to people. Poverty absorbs people into itself and the people, in turn, become a part of poverty, devoid of their human characteristics. In the same way, poverty, according to Green, is viewed as an object in which all social relations (and persons involved) are obscured. Issues such as structural failings (see earlier section), institutionalized inequalities, or corruption may lie at the heart of a region's poverty, but these are obscured by broad statements about poverty. Arjun Appadurai writes of the "terms of recognition" (drawn from Charles Taylor's 'points of recognition'), which are given the poor and are what allows poverty to take on this generalized autonomous form. The terms are "given" to the poor because the poor lack social and economic capital, and thus have little to no influence on how they are represented and/or perceived in the larger community. Furthermore, the term "poverty" is often used in a generalized matter. This further removes the poor from defining their situation as the broadness of the term covers differences in histories and causes of local inequalities. Solutions or plans for reduction of poverty often fail precisely because the context of a region's poverty is removed and local conditions are not considered.

The specific ways in which the poor and poverty are recognized frame them in a negative light. In development literature, poverty becomes something to be eradicated, or, attacked. It is always portrayed as a singular problem to be fixed. When a negative view of poverty (as an animate object) is fostered, it can often lead to an extension of negativity to those who are experiencing it. This in turn can lead to justification of inequalities through the idea of the deserving poor. Even if thought patterns do not go as far as justification, the negative light poverty is viewed in, according to Appadurai, does much to ensure little change in the policies of redistribution.

=== Poverty as restriction of opportunities ===
The environment of poverty is one marked with unstable conditions and a lack of capital (both social and economical) which together create the vulnerability characteristic of poverty. Because a person's daily life is lived within the person's environment, a person's environment determines daily decisions and actions based on what is present and what is not. Dipkanar Chakravarti argues that the poor's daily practice of navigating the world of poverty generates a fluency in the poverty environment but a near illiteracy in the environment of the larger society. Thus, when a poor person enters into transactions and interactions with the social norm, that person's understanding of it is limited, and thus decisions revert to decisions most effective in the poverty environment. Through this a sort of cycle is born in which the "dimensions of poverty are not merely additive, but are interacting and reinforcing in nature."

According to Appadurai, the key to the environment of poverty, which causes the poor to enter into this cycle, is the poor's lack of capacities. Appardurai's idea of capacity relates to Albert Hirschman's ideas of "voice" and "exit" which are ways in which people can decline aspects of their environment; to voice displeasure and aim for change or to leave said aspect of environment. Thus, a person in poverty lacks adequate voice and exit (capacities) with which they can change their position. Appadurai specifically deals with the capacity to aspire and its role in the continuation of poverty and its environment. Aspirations are formed through social life and its interactions. Thus, it can be said, that one's aspirations are influenced by one's environment. Appadurai claims that the better off one is, the more chances one has to not only reach aspirations but to also see the pathways which lead to the fulfillment of aspirations. By actively practicing the use of their capacity of aspiration the elite not only expand their aspiration horizon but also solidify their ability to reach aspirations by learning the easiest and most efficient paths through said practice. On the other hand, the poor's horizon of aspiration is much closer and less steady than that of the elite.

Thus, the capacity to aspire requires practice, and, as Chakravarti argues, when a capacity (or decision making process) is not refined through practice it falters and often fails. The unstable life of poverty often limits the poor's aspiration levels to those of necessity (such as having food to feed ones family) and in turn reinforces the lowered aspiration levels (someone who is busy studying, instead of looking for ways to get enough food, will not survive long in the poverty environment). Because the capacity to aspire (or lack thereof) reinforces and perpetuates the cycle of poverty, Appadurai claims that expanding the poor's aspiration horizon will help the poor to find both voice and exit. Ways of doing this include changing the terms of recognition (see previous section) and/or creating programs which provide the poor with an arena in which to practice capacities. An example of one such arena may be a housing development built for the poor, by the poor. Through this, the poor are able to not only show their abilities but to also gain practice dealing with governmental agencies and society at large. Through collaborative projects, the poor are able to expand their aspiration level above and beyond tomorrow's meal to the cultivation of skills and the entrance into the larger market.

== See also ==
- Attributions for poverty
- Basic income
- Citizen's dividend
- Criticism of credit scoring systems in the United States
- Distributive justice
- Economic inequality
- Extreme poverty
- Foreign aid
- Georgism
- Guaranteed minimum income
- Homelessness
- Land monopoly
- Negative income tax
- Political corruption
- Poverty reduction
- Progress and Poverty
- Regressive tax
- Rent-seeking
- Social safety net
- Unemployment
- Urban renewal
- Wage slavery
- The Wealth of Nations

The factors causing poverty and suffering
