= NCB =

NCB may refer to:

== Banks ==
- NCB Group, investment bank (now defunct)
- National Central Bank within the Eurosystem
- Nanyang Commercial Bank
- National Cooperative Bank
- National Commercial Bank (Saudi Arabia)

== Government ==
- Narcotics Control Bureau, the Indian drug enforcement agency
- National Central Bureau, a national organisation unit of Interpol; see Zimbabwe Republic Police § INTERPOL National Central Bureau (INTERPOL NCB)
- National Child Benefit
- National Coal Board
- National Codification Bureau
- Naval Construction Battalions (Abbreviation used for US Navy Seabee Battalions in WWII)

== Groups, organizations, companies ==
- National Cargo Bureau
- National Children's Bureau
- National Coordination Board (Syria)
- National Coordination Body for Democratic Change, a Syrian political bloc
- Nasser Club Bar Elias, a Lebanese association football club
- Nordisk Copyright Bureau, a copyright administration organization based in Denmark
- North Cornwall Broadcasting, formerly BC Radio and now known as NCB Radio in Bodmin, Cornwall
- Northern Coachbuilders, the former name of Smith Electric Vehicles
- Nottingham Concert Band

== Other uses ==
- Nitro cold brew coffee
- New Catholic Bible, a Catholic version of the Bible in English

== See also ==
- NBC (disambiguation)
- CNB (disambiguation)
- CBN (disambiguation)
- BNC (disambiguation)
- BCN (disambiguation)
