= Child care in Canada =

Primary responsibility for early learning, preschool and child care in Canada rests with the 13 provincial and territorial governments. The federal role is governed by the Canada Early Learning and Child Care Act, enacted in 2024, and involves a national scheme of transfer payments to those governments, who in turn use it to fund low-cost regulated spaces. To this end, the Act requires the federal government to enter into bilateral agreements with the provinces and territories, which form the backbone of the Canada-wide Early Learning and Child Care (CWELCC) system. The goal of the scheme is to provide universal, high-quality care to the Canadian population of children, while facilitating the social mobility of parents.

Since 1984, advocates had engaged in a number of unsuccessful attempts to establish a national child care system. By 2019, about 60% of children who were 0 to 5 years-old participated in day care arrangements. Of these, 52% were in formal day care settings and 26% were cared for by a relative in an informal setting. About 40% of parents had difficulty finding child care arrangements. As of 2016, 30% of child care operations in Canada were for-profit, which includes large single-owner corporate chains. Some federal, provincial, territorial, and municipal public funding of child care is limited to not-for-profit child care operations.

In the spring of 2021, the federal government announced the creation of a national child-care system, with $30 billion over five years in federal funds to "cut child-care fees to an average of $10 per day" across Canada. All ten provinces and three territories have signed onto this national child care program. Contemporary issues relating to child-care in Canadian politics include lack of sufficient early childhood education workers, driven by low wages, lack of benefits, and high stress, as well as controversies about the role of the government in child-care, and the status of for-profit operators.

== Overview ==
Under Canadian federalism, the 13 provinces and territories have the "main responsibility for early learning and child care (ELCC)". The division of powers between federal and provincial governments was first established in the Constitution Act, 1867. Early learning and child care were not specifically identified as provincial matters in 1867, but fall within the broad scope of provincial power, along with many other social programs. Especially since World War II, national social programs were developed in which the federal government led the initiative or collaborated with the provinces. Between 1984 and 2005, numerous attempts were made at establishing a national child care strategy, but true national child care strategy was not implemented until 2021 when the federal budget included "$30 billion over five years to cut child-care fees to an average of $10 per day across the country" by 2025-26.

Enacted in 2024, the Canada Early Learning and Child Care Act sets out the federal government's long-term commitment to providing transfer payments to the provinces and territories, who directly fund and regulate daycare spaces. The Act requires this funding to be disbursed through bilateral agreements, which must be consistent with certain principles, including universality and official bilingualism. These agreements constitute the backbone of the national system.

Prior to 2021, child care services were "organized on a market model." According to the Child Care Advocacy Association of Canada (CCAAC), this resulted in "unaffordable parent fees, inequitable and inadequate availability of services, and, too often, of low or modest quality." The exception was the province of Québec, which implemented its Québec Educational Childcare Act in 1997 which provides publicly subsidized child care for children ages 0 to 12.

Child care in Canada includes formal care, such as day care, and informal child care arrangements that allow some parents to be actively engaged in the labour market. Prior to the implementation of the CWELCC, about 60% of children who were 0 to 5 years-old participated in day care arrangements, as of 2019. Of these, 52% were in formal day care settings and 26% were care for by a relative. About 40% of parents had difficulty finding child care arrangements. According to a Statistics Canada 2019 report, based on the "Survey on Early Learning and Child Care Arrangements" (SELCCA), "[c]hild care is an important economic contributor for families since provision of non-parental child care is a necessity for some parents to engage in the labour market or to study."

Leading up to the implementation of a national child-care program, a 2019 CCAAC report summarized the major challenges in the delivery of child care services as a "severe shortage of spaces, unaffordable fees, poor working conditions for early childhood educators (ECEs), service gaps that have led to the expansion of for-profit services, and programs of questionable quality." The report listed the most significant barriers that impeded the implementation of a national strategy for ELCC as "Canadian federalism, an unwillingness to allocate sufficient public funding, and the contested historical belief that publicly-funded child care should be treated as "welfare" rather than a universal entitlement."

== History ==
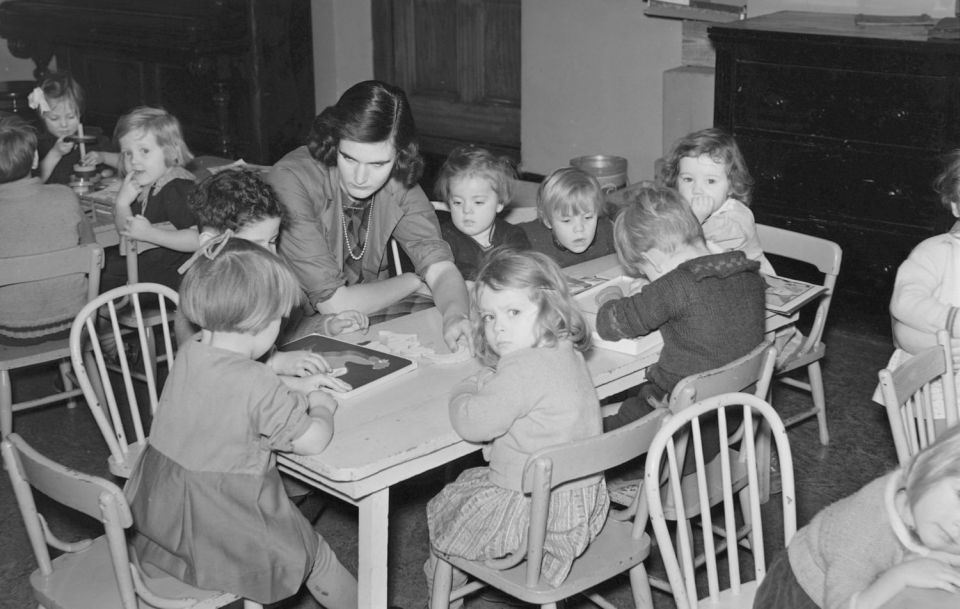
Preschoolers in Montreal, 1940

According to the Childcare Resource and Research Unit (CRRU) 249-page annual report, "Early Childhood Education and Care in Canada 2019", which was partially funded by the federal government's Employment and Social Development Canada's (ESDC) Social Development Partnerships program, past attempts at advancing child care programs have been made in 1984, 1987, 1993, 2003, and 2005. In spite of this, by 2020 Canada never had a "comprehensive national strategy or policy" as changes in governments repeatedly intervened.

The Child Care Advocacy Association of Canada was founded in 1983 as part of the massive women's rights movement in Canada putting pressure on the Liberal government of then Prime Minister Pierre Trudeau for a national child care program. By 1983, with approximately a million children needing child care outside the home, "only 1 in 10 was registered in a licensed day-care center." With the debate on child care in Canada heating up, then Prime Minister John Turner appointed a task force on the state of daycare across Canada which resulted in the 428-page 1986 report.

A national day care system was one of Brian Mulroney's promises in his 1984 Canadian federal election campaign. He unsuccessfully attempted to pass Bill C-144, which would have "shifted federal-provincial responsibilities for daycare and allowed for direct funding of commercial day centers." The Canadian Day Care Advocacy Association heavily critiqued Bill C-144 in a news release, arguing that the bill failed to meet the needs of low-income Canadians and worsened the overall quality of care. By 1992, the Conservative caucus shifted their focus from child care to child poverty in response to a national survey.

In a 2004 review of Canada' child care system, the OECD identified "adverse effects of fragmented governance" on the quality of child care and recommended that provinces merge "early education, child care and family support services under a single ministry". In 2004 none of the 13 provinces and territories had merged departments. By 2017, only Alberta, Manitoba, Newfoundland, the Yukon Territories had not merged departments.

The 2005 Canadian Federal Budget during the premiership of Paul Martin, included CA$5 billion over five years for a national day care program similar to Québec's child care system. The federal and provincial governments signed bilateral agreements "Moving Forward on Early Learning and Child Care". This allowed individual provinces to access the new federal funding. Both Saskatchewan and Manitoba signed agreements through which they committed to expanding only in the non-profit sector. Ontario did not. In 2005, the Ontario Coalition for Better Child Care, said that there needs to be support for "more and better before and after school learning and care opportunities for children 6-12". The Coalition also noted that the agreement was not binding on Ontario in regards to additional funding from the province to child care. Without both federal and provincial funding, longer-term child care is unsustainable in Ontario. When Stephen Harper won the 2006 Canadian federal election, the new government eliminated the bilateral agreements on child care as their first act of power. The Harper government replaced the Liberal early education and child care plan with the Universal Canada Child Benefit (UCCB). This consisted of parents with young children receiving CA$100 a month, along with tax credits for private or profit care. A maximum of CA$250 million a year was set aside to create child care spaces all across Canada.

In 2008, Canada ranked at the bottom of the list of 25 Organisation for Economic Co-operation and Development (OECD) countries based on benchmarks of ELCC delivery, according to an often-cited UNICEF 2008 early childhood education and care. Since 2008, while other OECD countries continued to develop child care systems, Canada "barely improved".

A November 2012 TD Economics special report recommended that federal and provincial governments should make investment in early childhood education a "high priority", noting that "public spending" on early childhood education was lower in Canada than in "many advanced economies".

Following the election of Justin Trudeau in 2015, child care policy became a renewed area of focus. In 2016, the federal government combined the Canada Child Tax Benefit and the Universal Canada Child Benefit into an enhanced Canada Child Benefit, a means-tested cash transfer to most Canadian families. The federal government began negotiating Multilateral Early Learning and Child Care Framework agreement with provinces and territories in 2017. These three-year bilateral agreements "set how much federal funding for early learning and child care would be allocated and spent by each jurisdiction." The 2021 federal budget tabled by Finance Minister Chrystia Freeland marked a new era in child care policy, though it built on the earlier Multilateral Early Learning and Child Care Framework agreements. The budget included approximately CA$30 billion over 5 years for a "Canada-wide early learning and child care plan". The funds will "offset the cost of early learning and child care services" towards the creation a national child-care system. The stated goal of the child care plan was to reduce the average cost of child care by 50% by 2022 and to make $10-a-day child care universally available by 2025-26. As child care falls under provincial jurisdiction, his national program required all provinces and territories to sign onto the program. British Columbia was the first province to sign onto the plan in the summer of 2021, but all provinces and territories have now signed onto the plan.

On March 6, 2025, Trudeau announced that a $37 billion, five-year deal had been reached with all provinces and territories except Alberta and Saskatchewan to extend the child care program until 2031, with annual 3% funding increases after new deal's first year in 2026-27. Organizational and logistic issues with starting the program, inflation, and labour shortages meant that at the time of the announcement, only 150,000 of the originally announced 250,000 spots had been created, with the remaining spaces planned to be created within the first year of the new deal.

== Types of child care ==
Formal regulated child care options include for-profit and not-for-profit operations. Prior to 2004, only 20% of child care operations in Canada were for-profit. Since 2006, as the "funding for public child care and expansion of spaces stagnated", the number of "large corporate-type, regional chain and single-owner" for-profit operations grew rapidly across Canada. By 2016, 30% of regulated child care operations were for-profit. Provinces and territories—and in some cases municipalities—may have regulations in place to prevent public funding of for-profit child care operations.

By 2018, large corporate for-profit chains such as BrightPath, (Note: The Australian company, which "developed and operated" ABC Learning established its Canadian subsidiary, 123 Busy Beavers. Its name was changed to Edleun Group Inc when it became "Canada's first publicly-traded child care". Its name was changed to BrightPath in 2013. The UK-based Busy Bees, which is "majority owned by the Ontario Teachers' Pension Fund" acquired BrightPath.) Busy Bees, and Kids and Company were operating in some provinces in Canada.

== Cost of day care ==
The Canadian Centre for Policy Alternatives (CCPA) has been publishing their survey of fees for full-time, regulated child care for infants, toddlers and preschoolers in 37 cities across Canada since 2014, highlighting the least and most affordable options. Day care for infants is the highest rate, then toddlers and preschoolers.

The CCPA cited prices for for-profit child care services as high as CA$1,700 a month in Winnipeg, Manitoba. One of the co-authors of the CCPA 2021 report, "Sounding the Alarm: COVID-19's impact on Canada’s precarious child care sector" said that the "only way to stabilize this situation and prevent loss of child care spaces in the future—which women will need to re-enter the post-pandemic workforce—is through sustained, substantial public operational funding. We're sounding the alarm: the federal government must prioritize funding and full transformation of child care now, before it’s too late."

== Regulation of child care ==
The 1986 task force on child care listed staff/child ratios, group size, caregiver qualifications, curriculum, and physical environment as factors to consider when evaluating the quality of child care. Child care centres require a license to operate—provinces and territories can set their own minimum regulatory standards. Canada "requires that homes be supervised by a licensed agency" but resources to monitor and enforce these standards was inadequate at that time. Alberta "required no qualifications other than a minimum age to work with preschool children" until the late 1980s.

== Impact of COVID-19 on child care ==
In March 2020, child care services in almost all provinces and territories, were already in a "vulnerable financial and organizational situation". The primary source of revenue for most child care services was directly through parent fees. With closures caused by the pandemic, most of the regulated child care facilities were unable to pay their staff and were forced to lay off their employees. This led to a crisis across Canada where working parents were unable to access reliable child care. The dilemma of parents, most often mothers, became obvious to all Canadians. The CRRU 2020 report said that, across "Canada and across sectors, for the first time, the essential and central nature of child care for the economy's full functioning became apparent to a much broader population".

A November 2020 report RBC report warned that COVID-19 had "rolled back the clock on three decades of advances in women’s labour-force participation" and that this would slow down Canada’s economy recovery. Between February and October 2020, there were 20,600 Canadian women that left the work force while almost 68,000 men joined the labour force. With daycares offering services for smaller numbers of children, and more classes were online with children at home, women's child care became "more onerous" and may have forced "more women to choose not to work outside the home." Mothers of children who are under the age of 6, make up over 50% of women aged 35-39 who are out of the labour force, according to the analysis.

During the pandemic, across Canada, full-time licensed child care providers saw their enrollment drop. For profit child care facilities' parent fees became "unaffordably high."

The Covid 19 pandemic, however, also highlighted the critical importance of childcare to the workforce and economy. Partly as a result, after decades of discussion federal action was finally spurred, resulting in the roll out of $10 a day care.

== Early childhood educators ==
As federal and provincial governments work to create new child-care spots by 2026 to achieve the five year goal of cutting daily child care fees to $10, early childhood educators began leaving the profession in droves. Prior to COVID-19 pandemic, the focus had been on created affordable spaces so more parents, usually mothers, could work outside the home. During the pandemic thousands of educators have moved on to other jobs either to relieve the stress or to earn a higher income. Like many jobs that are gender biased, workers in early childhood education are underpaid and do not have pensions, paid sick days, or benefits. With the added strain of working harder to protect children in their care during the pandemic, workers who were not eligible for either sick days or priority vaccinations felt they were being "ignored" and "disrespected". As of March 2022, early childhood education was "not a financially viable career for anyone with even the most basic life goals."

== Child care in Québec ==
In 1997, the Québec Government implemented their Québec Educational Childcare Act in 1997 as part of their Family Policy, which included CA$5 a day child care, offering access to affordable child care to families at all levels of income. The Act sought to increase the participation of mothers in the labour force and improve school readiness, and enhance child development.

In 2004 there was a slight increase to CA$7 per day. Because child care costs were so low, there was a "100% take-up rate for low-fee spaces" with almost all children who are in daycare in CA$7 per day spaces. By 2015, childcare educators who had joined unions successfully negotiated much improved working conditions.

Twenty years later, according to the testimony of Pierre Fortin, a Université du Québec à Montréal Emeritus Professor of Economics who appeared before the Standing Committee on the Status of Women (FEWO) of the House of Commons in March 2017, a "unanimous finding of the research literature is that [Québec]'s low-fee universal childcare system...has had a spectacular impact on child care utilization and the labour force participation of mothers of young children." He reported that a "low-fee universal childcare system is more effective and less costly than the traditional, purely targeted system in providing high-quality childcare." Fortin said that was a "marked increase in Québec women’s participation in the labour force" since the province's policy of subsidizing child care was enacted.

A 2012 TD report said that the child care regime in Québec in place since 1997, is the most comprehensive in Canada. Along with the provision of CA$7 per day child care for children from 0 to 12-years old, it also includes care before and after school. As a result of the child care program, there was an increase in the rate of female participation in the labour force from the lowest to the highest in Canada. Standardized test scores rose to above the national average. There was an "increase in fertility rates and a 50% reduction in poverty".

Catherine Haeck, a co-author of a 2015 study evaluating Québec's subsidized child care regime and universal preschool policies, acknowledged that ECEC research has to consider the impacts of provincial and federal programs in their conclusions. For example, Québec's child care regime was enhanced by the December 31, 2000, amendment to the federal Employment Insurance Act increasing paid maternity and parental leave benefits which made it possible for more parents to remain out of the work force, and the child care market. Haeck included the introduction of the 1998 federal National Child Benefit Supplement which amended the 1993 Canadian Child Tax Benefit (CCTB) which increased low-income families total benefits. Québec, and other provinces also introduced provincial child tax benefits at that time to "promote attachment to the labour market". In a 2007 paper, in provinces that integrated benefits thereby providing labour market incentives, there was an estimated 33% "total decline in social assistance receipt between 1997 and 2000." Haeck and her colleagues said that Quebec's child care program led to "increased labour force participation by mothers." However, the report suggested that this increase was "mainly driven by highly educated mothers". A Fraser Institute article, citing the 2015 evaluation, said that the policy "did not improve school readiness and may even have had negative impacts on children from low-income families."

Michael Baker of the University of Toronto, Jonathan Gruber of the Massachusetts Institute of Technology, and Kevin Milligan of the University of British Columbia find that Quebec's $5 a day child care scheme (later rising to $7) raised mothers' participation rates substantially, but children suffered worse health outcomes. Also, Baker, Gruber and Milligan observe little impact on cognitive test scores, but negative effects on noncognitive skills. Also, these effects were persistent as children reached pre-teen and teenage years, relative to their peers in other provinces. Most strikingly, they find a sharp increase in criminal behaviour later in life among the cohorts exposed to the Quebec program. These effects are primarily for boys, who also see the largest deterioration in noncognitive skills. Further, findings of Michael Kottelenberg and Steven Lehrer suggest that the Quebec program had some positive impacts for children from single-parent families, but had generally negative impacts in two-parent families.
