= BCN =

BCN may refer to:

== Places ==
- Barcelona El Prat Airport, IATA code
- an abbreviation for the city of Barcelona
- Port of Barcelona, by shortened form of the UN/LOCODE ESBCN without the country prefix
- Baja California, geographical ISO 3166 code MX-BCN
- Birmingham Canal Navigations, a network of the English canal system in Birmingham, Wolverhampton

== Companies and organizations ==
- Banque Cantonale Neuchâteloise, a Swiss cantonal bank
- an abbreviation of the stock exchange Borsa de Barcelona
- Bird Conservation Nepal, a bird conservation organization founded in 1982 in Nepal
- BCN Competicion, a Spanish Formula 3000/GP2 Series motorsport team bought by Ocean Racing Technology in 2008
- Broadcasting Corporation of Newfoundland, public radio service of Newfoundland prior to absorption into the Canadian Broadcasting Corporation in 1949
- Broadcasting Corporation of Niue, government-owned broadcaster operating Niue's only television and radio channels
- Library of Congress of Chile (Spanish: Biblioteca del Congreso Nacional de Chile)
- Rinker School of Building Construction at the University of Florida, formerly abbreviated BCN

== Publications and literature ==
- Y Beibl Cymraeg Newydd, a Welsh Bible translation
- Bi Community News, a United Kingdom magazine serving the bisexual community
- Breaking Cat News, a syndicated comic strip

== Other uses ==
- Bicyclononyne, a small molecule used in the bioorthogonal chemistry of antibody-drug conjugates
- Board Certified in Neurofeedback, a certification administered by the Biofeedback Certification International Alliance
- Boron carbonitride, or as an initialism: "boron, carbon, and nitrogen", another name for heterodiamond, a superhard material
- Büro Center Nibelungenplatz, a skyscraper in Frankfurt am Main, Germany
- A model designation of the Type B videotape
