= CNB =

CNB may refer to:

== Businesses and organizations ==
- City National Bank (disambiguation)
- Central Narcotics Bureau, Singapore's primary drug enforcement agency
- Cherokee Nation Businesses, a conglomerate holding company fully owned by the Cherokee Nation
- City News Bureau of Chicago, a Chicago-area cooperative news agency
- National Ballet of Portugal, natively Companhia Nacional de Bailado
- Spanish National Center for Biotechnology, natively Centro Nacional de Biotecnología
- Czech National Bank (ČNB), the central bank of the Czech Republic
- In Black and White (CnB), a party coalition of Montenegro

== Other uses ==
- Changi Naval Base, Singapore
- Chinbon, a dialect of the Shö language, ISO 639-3 code cnb
- Conjunto Nacional (Brasília), a shopping mall in Brazil
- Coonamble Airport (IATA: CNB), New South Wales, Australia
- Core needle biopsy, a type of breast biopsy
- Cosmic neutrino background, a type of particle radiation originating from the big bang
- Kanpur Central railway station (Indian Railways station code CNB), formerly known as Cawnpore North Barracks station
