= Poverty and health in the United States =

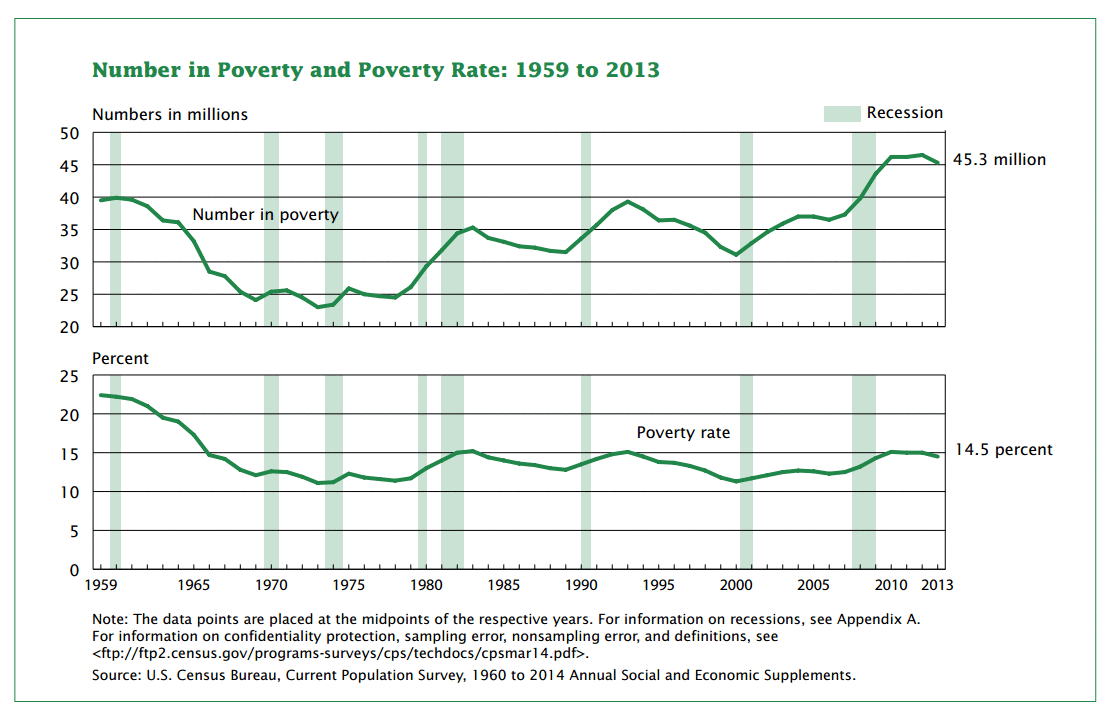
U.S. Poverty Trends

Poverty in the United States is associated with higher risks of adverse physical and mental health outcomes. In 2019, approximately 10.5% of the U.S. population lived below the federal poverty line. Health disparities associated with poverty reflect differences in access to health care, housing quality, availability of nutritious food, exposure to pollution, and broader social and economic resources. These disparities vary across demographic groups and reflect the combined effects of factors including race, ethnicity, gender, and age.

Long-term exposure to poverty has been associated with increased mortality risk. A 2023 study published in the Journal of the American Medical Association found that experiencing poverty for ten or more years is among the leading risk factors for death in the United States, associated with approximately 300,000 deaths annually.

== Mechanisms linking poverty and health ==
Poverty affects health through multiple mechanisms operating at the individual, household, and community levels. Limited financial resources are associated with reduced access to adequate housing, nutritious food, and preventive health care, increasing the risk of adverse health outcomes.

At the individual and household level, food insecurity, a common consequence of poverty, has been associated with poor diet quality, obesity, and diet-related chronic diseases. Limited financial resources are associated with reduced access to nutritious foods, increasing reliance on lower cost, energy dense options.

Barriers to health insurance and medical care have also been associated with delays diagnosis and treatment. Individuals with lower income are more likely to be uninsured or underinsured, limiting their ability to obtain necessary medical services and preventative care and education. Structural factors, including the cost of coverage and fragmentation of the U.S. health care system, have been associated with gaps in access to care.

Chronic stress represents a biological pathway linking poverty and health. Financial instability and social disadvantage can contribute to prolonged activation of stress-response systems, often described as increased allostatic load. Elevated allostatic load has been associated with increased risk of cardiovascular disease and mortality.

At the community level, neighborhood conditions and structural factors also influence health. Socioeconomic disadvantage and residential segregation have been associated with adverse birth outcomes, hypertension, cancer, and premature mortality. These environments may limit access to health-promoting resources such as quality health care, education, and safe living conditions.

Together, these mechanisms associated with higher rates of chronic disease, poorer mental health outcomes, and reduced life expectancy among populations experiencing poverty.

== Environmental health impacts ==
The environment of people in poverty impacts their health in many aspects. High poverty areas experience problems associated with poor air quality, water pollution, hazardous and toxic waste, and noise pollution. According to Unhealthy Cities: Poverty, Race, and Place in America, poor air quality results in higher rates of children with asthma living in these areas, and nearly 2 million children with asthma live in areas that do not meet national ozone standards. These children are also exposed to greater amounts of allergens that trigger their asthma. Water pollution is also present impoverished cities due which results in unsanitary practices due to poor water supply and sanitation. Impoverished communities are prone to be in proximity to hazardous waste facilities which result in toxic waste dumping, chemical runoff, and water pollution within the area. Because many residents of low-income areas are desperate, they tend to not protest against incoming hazardous facilities. Therefore, these facilities tend to seek out these communities to build in, and this results in more health costs for those in the area. Low-income populations are also more exposed to pesticides, and a significantly higher amount of lead was found in African-American children living in inner-city areas. Neglected Tropical Diseases (NTDs) are also more prevalent in areas of high poverty such as the South and inner-city areas though they often get overlooked by physicians for other diseases.

Climate change also affects the health of those living in low-income communities. Climate change can result in a greater frequency of bad allergy days which results in weakened immune systems and increase asthma cases within the community. From air pollution, respiratory and cardiovascular diseases can worsen due to the greater amounts of chemicals in the atmosphere and hotter temperatures. The warmer temperatures also result in warmer surface water bodies which are better environments for tropical diseases to take root and spread. Climate change also results in a higher frequency of storms, hurricanes, and floods which can result in greater damage to infrastructure resulting in more financial stress for people in low-income communities.

=== Spatial ===
Health outcomes of those in poverty can also be determined by spatial, or geographic, location which is another aspect of the environment. Opportunities for healthcare, goods and services like food, and community are all based on geography. Childhood/early adulthood settings highly influence behavior, education, and careers. Those who are financially unstable can usually only find homes that are lower-priced in neighborhoods that are not invested in and are not managed well. These homes are often lower quality, and the costs are higher than what can be managed. According to The Link between Neighborhood Poverty and Wealth: Context or Composition?, Residents in a high-poverty neighborhood reports poor health 1.63 times more than a person in a low-poverty neighborhood, even when controlling for factors like education, marital status, and labor force status. For those living in rural areas, health services are not as accessible, and impoverished people go to doctors fewer times than their counterparts. The effect of spatial location is seen in both physical and mental health.

== Poverty and physical health ==
Poverty can affect health outcomes throughout a person's entire life. The affect may not always be expressed while an individual is impoverished. Mothers who are in poverty during their pregnancies may experience more health risks during their delivery, and their newborn may experience more health risks and markedly more behavioral problems during their development. Research has shown that low-income families and their children face the most pressing struggles when it comes to receiving medical attention. Since its most recent reauthorization in 2018, the Children's Health Insurance Program (CHIP) aims at improving healthcare coverage for vulnerable families experiencing homelessness. This includes youth up to 26 years of age, pregnant women, and new mothers. The initiatives for youth, as well as the automatic enrollment at birth, together represent a significant step towards enhancing effective health care access for families in this population.

To elaborate more, children in poverty have worse health outcomes during adulthood. This effect is especially pronounced for specific ailments, such as heart disease and diabetes. The impact persists even if a youth escapes poverty by adulthood, suggesting that the stress of poverty encountered during childhood or adolescence has a lasting effect. Previous research has identified the labor environments of the impoverished as more likely to contain risk factors for illness and disability relative to their non-impoverished counterparts. The implication is that the unique stresses of life within an impoverished community contribute to poorer health outcomes, even if the resident does not engage in any specific behavior detrimental to their health. Early into the COVID-19 pandemic in North America, being impoverished was associated with an increased likelihood of contracting COVID-19, as well as dying from it.

Poor housing results in many health problems. Accidents, respiratory disease, and lead poisoning can be caused by poorly built housing. There can also be a lack of safe drinking water, pests, and dampness in the house, and gonorrhea is associated with deteriorating houses. Mothers who live in poverty areas have lower rates of prenatal care and higher rates of infant mortality and low birth weight. Tuberculosis rates are also higher in high-poverty areas. Obesity is associated with poverty due to lack of infrastructure that supports a healthy lifestyle. Often, poverty-areas do not have places to walk or get healthy food nearby, and they are bombarded with unhealthy promotions like cigarettes, alcohol, and fast food. High-poverty areas also had higher death rates than low-poverty areas.

The cost of housing is a huge detriment to physical health. Housing is what the poor pay the most for on a regular basis, and this results in lack of funds for other basic needs like food and health. In a National Health Interview Survey, it was found that around 10% of American families did not receive needed medical care because of cost. Food insecurity also increases due to being unable to buy food due to cost.

According to a 2023 study published in JAMA, cumulative poverty of a decade or more is the fourth leading risk factor for death in the United States annually, being associated with 295,000 deaths. A single year of poverty was associated with 183,000 deaths in 2019, making it the seventh leading risk factor. Up until the age of 40, poor people's survival rates were essentially comparable to those of more affluent people, according to UCR researchers, but after that point, they died at a rate that was noticeably higher.

== Poverty and mental health ==
After the 1980s decision to close long-term mental health-focused residential facilities, individuals suffered without adequate support systems and without access to community-based services. These individuals experienced unemployment, homelessness, and exposure to the criminal justice system, further exacerbating their mental illness.

Poverty in general also has a complex relationship with mental health. Being in poverty may itself provoke a condition of elevated emotional stress, known as "poverty distress". Poverty is also a precursor or risk factor for mental illness, particularly mood disorders, such as depression and anxiety. Schizophrenia is also strongly associated with poverty, occurring most frequently in the poorest classes of people all over the world, especially in more unequal countries. In a sort of reciprocating relationship, having mental illness is a major risk factor for being in poverty. Having a mental illness may inhibit a person's ability to work or deter employees from hiring them.

A hypothesis known as "drift hypothesis", posits that for people with psychiatric disorders (primarily schizophrenia), they tend to fall further down the socioeconomic ladder as their condition reduces their functionality. This hypothesis is an effort to establish that people with profoundly limiting psychiatric symptoms are more likely to descend economically, not that the financially challenged are more likely to present severe psychiatric disorders. People experiencing less severe symptoms are less likely to be affected by "drift".

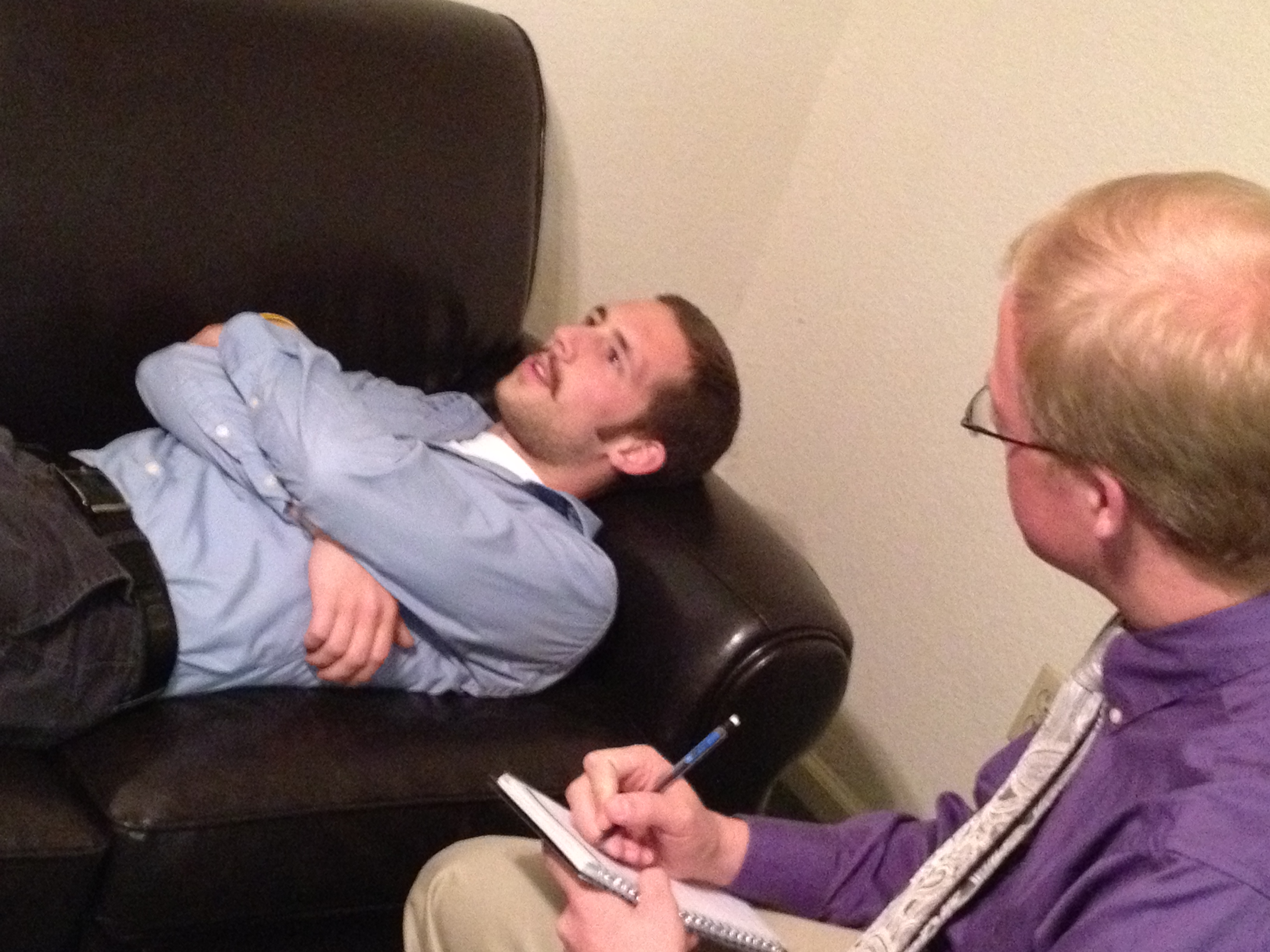
Receiving treatment has shown positive effects for those struggling with mental illness and poverty.

With those in poverty having a greater likelihood of suffering from mental illness, the benefit of access to clinical psychotherapy treatments has been explored. Despite numerous barriers to access to care for low-income individuals, there is evidence that those who do receive care respond with significant improvements. This research supports policy measures for improved outreach and access-to-care measures designed to benefit those with low-incomes and mental health disorders.

Mental health is affected by location as well. Noisy housing impacts reading in children and promotes psychological stress. Many poor families move more often and are residentially unstable. This results in children experiencing instability with relationships with peers. They also experience more stressful life events which places strain on their mental state as the events cumulate. As both parents and children try to cope, they may cut themselves off from social interactions and healthy development.

== Race and health ==
Poverty and race both impact the health outcome of a person. Of the residents in poverty-areas, well over half are people of color. When compared to White Americans, all other races have lower outcomes of infant mortality, low birth weight, prenatal care, and deaths in cities. People of Color have an 80% higher mortality rate than White people, and this includes deaths from cancer, accidents/homicides, and disease. Those in severe poverty are more likely to be Black Americans and Latin Americans. More than one-fourth of the Native American and Alaska Native population lives in poverty. When adjusted for age, the death rate of Native Americans and Alaska Natives is 40% higher than the general population, and 39% of the children are obese or overweight. Mental health is the number one problem in the Native American and Alaska Native population. For Black Americans, racial segregation in neighborhoods are barriers for equitable health opportunities. Most current neighborhoods that are predominantly Black have been institutionally disinvested and have fewer public services and more housing insecurity. With these barriers, many Black Americans do not have the wealth of a family home passed down through generations. Latinx and Asians may also have trouble with home ownership due to cultural and linguistic isolation.

American Indian and Alaska Native (AIAN) populations have the highest poverty rates in the United States when compared across different races and ethnicities. This applies especially to AIAN women who have the highest rate of about 1 in 4 women living in poverty. Figure 1 in an article shows a graph that describes and compares poverty rates in the United States and implementing gender and race/ethnicity as factors. AIAN men who are non-Hispanic have a 21.7% poverty rate and AIAN women who are non-Hispanic have a much higher rate of 24.6%. Another article stated that Native American women make up the majority of the population below the poverty level in the US. On the other hand, white males experience less poverty rates and are the minority of the low poverty rate level. Therefore, Native American women have the highest poverty rate in the United States, gender and all other races and ethnicities considered.

Racial minority poverty rates are disproportionate when compared to the White majority. This is influenced by many historical issues that involves people of color such as slavery, racial segregation, and inaccessible job and education opportunities. To put an end to the gap in poverty rates and provide equal opportunities for all families and all races, there are some strategies where everyone can work together as a team to make a difference in the world. Examples include:

- Raising the minimum wage
- Allow for more representation of people of color at high-end jobs
- Establish rent control by providing tenant protection and legal assistance
- Provide affordable education for children in low-income families
- Support small/local businesses
- Provide low-income communities with basic resources such as clean water, health care, housing, food, and environmental protection programs

== Gender differences and health ==
There is a huge gap in the poverty rates when comparing the differences between men and women. In the United States, women are more likely to face unemployment and experience homelessness. These rates have largely increased among women and families due to the COVID-19 pandemic. In response to economic insecurity and recession rates, Congress passed several assistance programs that offered unemployment benefits. One of these programs was mainly The Pandemic Emergency Unemployment Compensation (PEUC). This program offered extended benefits of up to 79 weeks for eligible individuals, instead of the general availability of only up to 26 weeks.

Many factors work interchangeably in the disproportionate gender gap and the limited availability of employment opportunities. Some of these factors include gender wage gap, gender wealth gap, domestic violence, underrepresentation of women in jobs, disability, and insufficient public assistance and support. All of these components call for justice and equality for both genders in the social and occupational setting. Some efforts to close the gap and disparities include legislators passing policies that provide increased protection for workers and promote nondiscriminatory financial services. Other ways to reduce the poverty gap is to increase the minimum wage and provide more access to financial assistance programs such as SNAP and WIC which allow families to afford a healthy diet. These programs are especially crucial for women who are mothers who have infants to feed. For more information on how to reduce poverty rates among women please see this article.

== Sexual minorities and health ==
Sexual orientation is a factor that has influence on poverty rates in the United States. This especially applies to the sexual minorities and the LGBTQ community due to the level of discrimination that they face in their daily lives. Discrimination is a considerable factor within the sexual orientation factor that also influences poverty rates among the LGBTQ population. Disparities experienced within this population leads to less employment opportunities, stressful work environments, and unaffordable and inaccessible basic necessities. Hostile work and social environments can cause decrease in mental health which could lead to unfortunate consequences such as depression, anxiety, internalized stress, family issues, insecurity, and self neglect.

LGBTQ individuals face difficulties with being offered lower paid positions in the workforce as well as limited benefits. Statistics as showed that the LGBTQ community are at an increased risk for financial and housing insecurity and fewer health care benefits. There are divisions among these individuals where they face different disproportionate rates based on racial and gender factors. The rates of which LGBTQ adults of color have no access to healthcare compared to other LGBTQ adults are a lot higher. About 32% of adults of color who are transgender lack health care coverage compared to only 22% of transgender adults. In terms of gender, about 29% of transgender women avoid seeing the doctor because they cannot afford it and have no health care insurance. This has unfortunate consequences such as worsened health issues and even death.

Transgender individuals are a part of the LGBTQ community who face difficulties as a result of poverty. A survey done by the Behavioral Risk Factor Surveillance System (BRFSS) created a sample of trans men, trans women, and gender nonconforming individuals. The poverty rate found for trans men is 33.7%, for trans women is 29.9%, and for gender nonconforming is 23.8%. From these results, it can be observed that trans men tend to face financial difficulties than trans women and gender neutral individuals. However, transgender people as a whole tend to have a highest poverty rates which is the same for cisgender bisexual women. On the other hand, cisgender gay men tend to struggle significantly less with financial difficulties and have the lowest poverty rates than other LGBTQ individuals.

== Age and health ==
=== Poverty among the elderly in America ===
My older adults struggle with financial insecurities, increases living costs, and debts. This is due to the risk of unemployment and decreasing retirement savings. As with other populations, there are sections of the pie where certain minorities in the elderly population experience different struggles due to gender, race, and sexual orientation. Poverty rates are higher among elderly women than elderly men due to the wage and wealth gap and at-home responsibilities. Black and Hispanic individuals among the elderly population experience more financial struggles and economic insecurity. Statistics show that about 43.4% of Black and 44.1% of Hispanic older adults are below 200% of the Federal Poverty Level (FPL). To provide benefits for the elderly, Social Security and pensions helped to raise the incomes of 16.5 million aging individuals above the FPL. Other benefits come from Medicaid, Medicare, and programs that provide food stamps such as SNAP which help to prevent poverty in America's aging population.

=== Poverty among the youth in America ===
Poverty among children and young people is influenced by poverty in adults that causes a continuous cycle if not prevented. Impacts that poverty have on the youth include lack of access to education and housing, discrimination, mental health problems, and malnutrition. This creates a problem in increased crime rates and social issues which has a negative impact on the economy.

Some ways to prevent poverty among young people include:

- Participating in volunteer assistance programs such as UNICEF
- Giving back and donating in your community
- Ensuring basic necessities for health
- Support environmental programs
- Promote child-sensitive education and nutrition

== U.S. Territories and poverty rates ==
=== Puerto Rico ===
Poverty in Puerto Rico is very prevalent and the rates are disproportionately high when compared to the United States as a whole. Research found that Puerto Rico poverty rates are more than three times higher than the U.S. and the other U.S. territories except American Samoa. The Puerto Rican population below the Federal Poverty Level (FPL) was 43% in 2021.

A factor to be considered is that Puerto Rico is the largest and most heavily populated U.S. territory. Many families experience financial struggles due to limited employment opportunities because there is not enough jobs for the working age population which are individuals between 25 and 54 years. As a result, children are affected and live in poverty due to little to no resources provided to sustain families. Therefore, children make up the second largest segment of individuals living in poverty in Puerto Rico compared to the largest segment which is the working age population.

Racial and gender are factors to be considered when it comes to poverty distribution in Puerto Rico. In 2021, the poverty rate of individuals who are below the FPL and identify as White was 41.5%. The poverty rate for individuals who identify as Black and below the FPL was 44.2%. The poverty rate for individuals who identify as another race and below the FPL was 47.5%.

Gender as another factor presents research that found that poverty is distributed differently across females and males. Women and girls who are living below the Federal Poverty Level in Puerto Rico is 23% while men and boys who are living below the FPL is 19%. Therefore, females represent a higher percentage of the poverty population than males.

=== Guam ===
To show some comparison, Guam's poverty rate as of 2019 is higher than Mississippi's which is the poorest state with the highest poverty rate among the other states. Interestingly, Guam does not have a government estimate each year like the 50 states do which use the U.S. Census Bureau to calculate poverty rates. In 2020, statistics showed that Guam's poverty rate is two times higher than the national average rate in the United States. The poverty rate of Guam in 2020 was 29.7% compared to the national average of 10.8%.

When considering gender factors, the population of Guam like Puerto Rico experience disproportionate rates among women and men as well as among the younger and older generation. The percentage of families that have women as the head of the household that were living in poverty was 44% of the 25.6% of families below the federal threshold income in 2019. In contrast, families with men as the head of the household and living in poverty had a percentage of 15%. Therefore, women-headed households are disproportionately overrepresented in family poverty rates. Most of the population that make up the 25.6% of household poverty are people over the age of 18 with a percentage of 54%. The older generation of individuals 65 years of age and older have a percentage of 4% in comparison.

=== American Samoa ===
As of 2019, the American Samoa poverty rate is 50.7% which is a decrease from its rate in 2009, 54.4%. In 2020, the COVID-19 pandemic significantly affected the American Samoa islands as well as the other U.S. territories. It impacted housing by causing a decline in household numbers from 6.00 in 2010 to 4.96 in 2020. The pandemic also affected economic characteristics data based on poverty and income statistics.

American Samoa is made up mostly of individuals who identify as Native Hawaiian and Other Pacific Islander. The total number of these people combined was reported to be 46,233 when also considering individuals who identify as Asian. The total population of the demographic profile of American Samoa reported in 2020 was 49,710. The social characteristics of the Samoan people were also released in 2020.

=== The Commonwealth of the Northern Mariana Islands (CNMI) ===
As of 2019, the Northern Mariana Islands poverty rate is 38.0% which means that the income of 17,876 people was below the federal poverty level out of the total population of 47,035. There is a food assistance program called the Nutrition Assistance Plan (NAP) that offers benefits for families. About 20.6% of households in the islands that have a low to no income are eligible and receive program benefits. Of the families who were a part of the NAP program, 25.2% had an individual between 15 and 24 years of age. In comparison, 12.8% had an individual that was 65 years of age and older.

The Northern Mariana Islands are made up individuals who reported that they are Asian alone and individuals who reported that they are Native Hawaiian and Other Pacific Islander. About 46.6% of the population reported their race as being Asian alone. About 43.7% reported that they were Native Hawaiian and Other Pacific Island.

=== The U.S. Virgin Islands (USVI) ===
In 2019, the U.S. Census Bureau collected demographic, economic, and social characteristics of the USVI population to conduct a cross tabulation. Statistics show that 22.8% was the poverty rate for USVI households. To compare the factor of race, Black or African American individuals had a higher poverty rate of 24.3% while White individuals had a lower poverty rate of 11.5%. The population that had the highest poverty rate when considering race is the Hispanic/Latino individuals with a poverty rate of 31.4%.

To help individuals experiencing financial difficulties, a program called Supplemental Nutrition Assistance Plan (SNAP) provides eligible households with benefits such as access to food and other resources. To compare households that received these benefits based on the age factor, households with a young person had a higher participant rate than households with an elderly person. Of all the households, 32.4% with an individual between ages 15 and 24 received benefits compared to 14.7% of those with an individual aged 65 years and older.

Unemployment of individuals 16 years and older is not very high with 90.3% having a job and only 9.7% who did not. To compare unemployment rates based on gender, women had a higher rate compared to men. Women had an unemployment rate of 10.1% while men had an unemployment rate of 9.3%.

The U.S. Virgin Islands is mostly made up of Black or African-American individuals which makes up about 71.4% of the total population. Hispanic/Latino individuals made up about 18.4% of the population which means that they are the second largest group in the USVI. White individuals made up 13.3% with the Multiracial population being the smallest group which made up about only 7.5% of the total USVI population.

== Homelessness and health ==
Homelessness is a public welfare and health epidemic within the United States. Any period of homelessness is associated with adverse health consequences. These adverse health consequences are associated with poor living conditions and a lack of access to treatment facilities. Due to living in extreme poverty, it is unlikely for an individual or a family to have a healthcare plan. These healthcare plans are important in obtaining treatment for illnesses or injury from treatment facilities. Without it, individuals and families are left to deal with their ailments themselves or endure further financial burden by receiving treatments without a health insurance plan.

Respiratory infections and outbreaks of tuberculosis and other aerosol transmitted infections have been reported. Homeless intravenous drug users are at an increased risk of contracting HIV, and hepatitis B and C infections.

The close living spaces of areas such as Skid Row in California provide an environment in which infectious diseases can spread easily. These areas with a high concentration of homeless individuals are dirty environments, with little resources for personal hygiene. A 2018 report to congress estimated that 35% of homeless people were in unsheltered locations not suitable for human habitation.

There is a bidirectional relationship between homelessness and poor health. Homelessness exacts a heavy toll on individuals. The longer individuals experience homelessness, the more likely they are to experience poor health and be at higher risk for premature death. Health conditions, such as substance use and mental illness, can increase people's susceptibility to homelessness. Conversely, homelessness can cause further health issues, due to constant exposure to environmental threats such as violence and communicable diseases. Homeless people have disproportionately high rates of poly substance use, mental illness, physical health problems and legal issues/barriers in attaining employment.

A 2000 study found that large numbers of homeless people work, but few homeless people are able to generate significant earnings from employment alone. Physical health problems limit work and daily activities, which are barriers to employment. Substance use is positively associated with a lower work level, and negatively related to a higher work level. Those with physical health problems are substantially more likely than those with mental health problems to be in the more generous disability programs. Substance use disorders are a barrier to participation in disability programs. A 2015 study found that rates of participation in government programs are low, and that people with major mental disorders have a low participation rate in disability programs.

== Health care policy ==
Between 1987 and 2005, the number of people without health insurance in the United States rose from just over 30 million, to 46.6 million. Insurance tends to increase the price of services, and at that time, 8.5% of people belonging to households that made over $75,000 annually were uninsured. For families earning $25,000 or less, that percentage rose to 24.4% uninsured. This figure exhibits how lack of access to care via health insurance disproportionately affects those in poverty.

Graph from U.S. Census Bureau on rates of uninsured Graph showing

Despite the cost of healthcare being an obstacle for those with relatively low incomes, research suggests that insurance coverage will not dramatically change outcomes related to physical health. Access to Medicaid for low-income adults aided in diagnosis of metabolic disease, saw a reduction in diagnosis of mental health disorders, and reduced incurrence of "catastrophic medical costs" by patients dramatically. While these positive effects were observed, outcomes for heart disease, diabetes, and other physical health characteristics were not meaningfully improved. It has been posited that one year, the duration of the study, is an insufficient length to fully observe the divergent health outcomes that would be characteristic of an experiment with a lengthier timetable. Also, minorities have an excess number of deaths due to diseases like cancer and cardiovascular disease compared to whites.

While Medicaid does provide diverse healthcare services to vulnerable populations, many are not eligible to receive these. To receive Medicaid, an individual must show proof of income, citizenship status, and residency. Unhoused individuals often struggle to provide such documentation, or they may not meet the standards and income thresholds, thus limiting their access to Medicaid and the essential healthcare services that follow.

Even if they can receive Medicaid coverage, homeless individuals are sometimes turned away by healthcare providers unwilling to treat them. For their part, healthcare providers cite the difficulties of reimbursement rates and other administrative burdens.

The medical-industrial complex also contributes to the difficulties of patients paying for medications and healthcare costs.

=== Actions taken by the government ===
The United States government has passed acts to make healthcare more accessible. Though it does not have universal health coverage, the country has two forms of public insurance, Medicare and Medicaid. Medicare is insurance for those who are over 65 or have long-term disabilities or end-stage renal disease. Medicaid allows for federal funding to match health care services and allow low-income families, low-income pregnant women, low-income children up to 18 years old, the blind, and those with disabilities to have these services. Medicaid is administered by states, so states have the right to set the criteria for eligibility. According to The Commonwealth Fund website, Medicaid now covers 17.9% of Americans. The Children's Health Insurance Program (CHIP) provides insurance to children in low-income families and covers 9.6 million children, according to The Commonwealth Fund. The Affordable Care Act was passed in 2010, and it expanded Medicaid eligibility and provided funding for federally qualified health centers. These centers take patients regardless of ability to pay and provides free vaccines to uninsured and underinsured children. Community mental health services are also funded by the federal government through grants provided to states by the Substance Abuse and Mental Health Services Administration.

=== Recommendations to further improve healthcare access ===
One recommendation to address the inequity of healthcare for the poor is to take community-based action. One example of this is county health councils in Tennessee. These are volunteer groups from the community who assess health inequities within their county and decide what policies to implement. Another idea is to implement community-oriented primary care where physicians consider the environment and culture of the patient to further their health. To improve housing, weatherization programs are recommended to refurbish poor housing to be more health friendly.

Health care clinics, including free clinics, can help individuals with transportation and health care costs alleviate issues that come up like transportation and financial constraints.

Policy wise, it is recommended to continue investing in the health of the poor by creating an amendment or law and increasing affordable housing. The amendment would ensure that adequate housing is a right to be enjoyed by everyone, and if that could not happen, then a law could be passed for a better housing policy. Affordable housing can be increased by increasing subsidies through housing vouchers for households or reduced interest loans for developers.
