= Child poverty in Canada =

Child poverty in Canada declined since 2015, with the number of children who were living in poverty decreasing 71% by 2020.

In 1989, with a million children living in poverty in Canada, members of parliament voted unanimously to eliminate child poverty by the year 2000. By 2013, the rate child poverty in Canada was higher than it was in 1989, and was approaching the poverty rates of the mid-1970s in spite of the growth of Canada's economy between 1981 and 2010.

As of 2018, the rate of child poverty in Canada was close to the average of other OECD member nations.

Child poverty has a disproportionately high effect on Indigenous households in Canada. According to a 2019 study by researchers at the Assembly of First Nations and the Canadian Centre for Policy Alternatives (CCPA), nearly 50% of Indigenous children in Canada—both on and off reserve—were living in poverty. In 2020, 4.7% of children under 18 were living in poverty, which was a significant decrease from the 9.7% child poverty rate in 2019. Other groups that are at a higher risk of experiencing poverty include children living in single-parent households and recent immigrants.

== Current ==
Citing Statistics Canada, Hertzberg said that the "number of Canadian children in poverty" fell 71% since 2015; that the "number of children and teenagers living below the poverty line" fell by 780,000 and the "proportion living in poverty...dropped to 4.7%, one of the lowest rates on record".

== Overview ==
Child poverty in Canada became a major social issue the late 1980s. On November 24, 1989, all Canadian Parliamentarians had unanimously voted to eliminate child poverty by the year 2000, in response to the final speech before his retirement, made by Ed Broadbent, then leader of the NDP. Broadbent had called for a resolution raising concern "for the more than one million Canadian children living in poverty." By 2000, Denmark, Sweden, Norway, and Finland had almost abolished child poverty. By 2013, the rate child poverty in Canada was higher than it was in 1989, and was approaching the poverty rates of the mid-1970s in spite of the growth of Canada's economy between 1981 and 2010.

In 1991, Canada ratified The United Nations Convention on the Rights of the Child (UNCRC). Since then, Campaign 2000 has been producing its annual "Report Card on Child Poverty in Canada".

In 1998 the Canada Child Tax Benefit (CCTB) and the National Child Benefit Supplement (NCB-S) were introduced. As a result of this support, the enhanced child care support, and an increase in employment, low‑income rates for single‑parent households began to decrease.

The 2004 Campaign2000 said that "[c]ontrary to popular belief", most households with child poverty includes the "working poor", whose parents work in jobs that do not provide "adequate pay, sufficient hours or benefits".

In the period following the Great Depression, from 2007 to 2014—in contrast with other OECD nations—the standard of living of children in poor single-parent households declined while for those in poor two-family households, it improved. In the latter, both market income and disposable income increased. (Note: Market income refers to the "sum of: wages and salaries, net self-employment net income, interest and investment income, private pension and registered retirement savings plan income, and includes alimony or support income received...Disposable income refers to the total income remaining after payment of "income tax, employment insurance contributions, public and private pension plan contributions, childcare expenses incurred in order to hold a paid job, alimony or support payments paid, and public health insurance premiums (Thévenon 2018:17).")

The "Census in Brief" report said that in 2015, 38.9% children in a lone‑parent family lived in a household with an income below the LICO threshold. Of these, 42% of children in single-parent homes with their mothers lived in low-income homes compared to 25.5% of children who lived with their fathers.

In July 2016, the federal government introduced the Canada Child Benefit (CCB), which was a " significant investment" towards reducing child poverty. An OECD working paper said that it was anticipated that the CCB would "lift 300,000 children out of poverty."

In 2020, 4.7% of children under 18 were living in poverty, which was a significant decrease from the 9.7% child poverty rate in 2019. According to a March 24, 2022 Bloomberg News article on Statistics Canada Canadian Income Survey, 2020 released on March 23, by data reporter Erik Hertzberg, in 2020, the number of Canadians under 18 who live in poverty fell by more than half to 324,000." Citing Statistics Canada, Hertzberg said that the "number of Canadian children in poverty" fell 71% since 2015; that the "number of children and teenagers living below the poverty line" fell by 780,000 and the "proportion living in poverty...dropped to 4.7%, one of the lowest rates on record". Children in lone-parent families remain more vulnerable to poverty. In 2020, the child poverty rate was 3% for those living in couple families, compared with 16.9% for those in female lone-parent families.

== Indigenous child poverty in Canada ==
A 2013 Canadian Centre for Policy Alternatives (CCPA) report said that, the average Indigenous child poverty rate was about 50% compared to 17% for all children in Canada in 2013. In Manitoba it was 62% and in Saskatchewan it was 64%.

In 2015, the federal rural riding of Churchill—Keewatinook Aski in Manitoba—which is home to many First Nations—had the highest child poverty rate in Canada in 2015 with about 64.2% living in poverty, according to the a Campaign2000 2018 riding-by- riding analysis.

New Brunswick's 2021 Child poverty report card reported that in that province, the highest rates of child poverty were found on Indigenous reserves. The report stated that families living on First Nations reserves all across the country were faced with "substandard housing, unsafe drinking water, poor health, high suicide rates, and intergenerational trauma". According to the authors of this report, David Macdonald and Daniel Wilson, the rate of childhood poverty seems to imply that Canada's allocation of funding designed to assist Indigenous children is failing to match the severity of the problem. Schools on reserves lack resources

Macdonald and Wilson said that all levels of government were failing to provide Indigenous children with assistance and resources. Schools on reserves provided inadequate education as they lacked necessary resources as the ratio of applicants far outweighs the funding that they receive. This includes a lack of access to safe drinking water, substandard and overcrowded housing.

In the June 24, 2019 report, the third in the Upstream Institute's series on indigenous child poverty, researchers at the Assembly of First Nations and the CCPA, the authors met with provincial premiers to report that nearly 50% of Indigenous children were living in poverty.

== See also ==
- Child poverty in Australia
- Child poverty in Japan
- Child poverty in New Zealand
- Child poverty in the United States
- Child poverty in Vietnam
- Human Rights in Canada
- Poverty in Canada
