= Child poverty in the United States =

A large proportion of children in the United States experience poverty. As of 1992, children were the largest age group living below the poverty line, and around 1 in 5 children were affected as of 2016. Child poverty is measured using absolute and relative methods. It is caused by many factors, including race, education, and family structure, but ultimately race correlates with these factors. There are multiple effects due to this. Effects on health and development cause lifelong problems and lower educational outcomes, and food insecurity can also be caused by child poverty. The United States government has put in place programs using tax credits and transfers. There are also community programs that have impacted specific communities that have high child poverty rates. For future policies, research suggests that greater investment directed to children and families in poverty and connections between healthcare providers and financial services can lower the child poverty rate. Under the Census Bureau's Supplemental Poverty Measure, 9.7 million children under age 18, or 13.4%, were in poverty in 2024, compared with 13.7% in 2023.

== Causes ==
=== Education ===
The education levels of the parents are shown to have an effect on the likelihood of child poverty. Parents who have an education only up to a high school diploma or less are much more likely to be poor due to the lack of high-paying jobs for low-skilled workers. This population may have a lower quality education as well if they grew up in a poor community, and this also causes them to be less skilled and desirable to employers. Due to their lower level of education, these people are likely to have lower incomes which translates into a lack of material needs like food and electricity. This population may also have more health problems. This can be due to genetics or malnutrition, and they are likely to work more physical jobs that may cause health problems in the future.

=== Family structure ===
The structure of a household affects the likelihood of child poverty. Since the 1960s, the structure of a family has changed, and there are many more single-parent households, especially households headed by a mother. More specifically, there was an increase in black households with single parents, and about 30% of the gap between black and white households in poverty is because of the likelihood of black families headed by single mothers. Studies show that single-parent households are likely to be in poverty, and this is especially true for households headed by single mothers. In single-mother households, 30.6% are poor compared to only 6.2% for married families. Unlike most of the world, in the United States, all single-parent households have a higher risk for poverty.

The amount of earners present in a household also contributes to child poverty. Families with 2 or more earners will have more income and are less likely to have child poverty, and this is a trend seen globally. Single-parent households, therefore, are at a disadvantage because the revenue of only one person is present which is a reason for the greater amounts of child poverty, and households with no earners face the most risk of poverty.

=== Spatial differentiation ===
Map of poverty rates by county

There are certain regions with higher concentrations of child poverty, due to employment opportunities, industries, and racial/ethnic distribution. Counties with mainly mining, farming, and government dependent industries have the highest levels of poverty with 23%, 21%, and 20% respectively. Communities dependent on mining and farming have higher rates of disability and lower rates of health insurance coverage, causing difficulty in providing for children. Areas with low rates of commuters for work are also shown to have higher child poverty rates than areas with higher commuter rates. Children in rural areas are more affected by child poverty as well. Many key industries have disappeared from these areas, resulting in service sector jobs that have lower pay and are less stable replacing them.

Certain regions of the country have concentrated regions of child poverty: Appalachia, the Mississippi Delta, the Black Belt, the Four Corners, Native American Reservations, southwest Texas, etc. The South is especially unique because it has a history of racial discrimination, agriculture dependency, and, more recently, manufacturing opportunities. In the region, there is a close link with farming and race with a high population of African-Americans dependent on farming. In the country, there is also a correlation between high minority communities and high rates of child poverty. High minority communities had a mean child poverty rate of 22% while low minority communities had a mean rate of 16%. Unemployment is also a spatial factor of child poverty, especially in low minority communities.

=== COVID-19 pandemic ===
In the United States, the COVID-19 pandemic has increased child poverty and its effects. Before the pandemic, around 10% of families in the country experienced food insecurity. Due to the pandemic, the food insecurity rate has increased by a factor of 2 or 3, resulting in children experiencing food insecurity in around 2 in 5 households. In rural counties, food insecurity doubled from 18% to 35%. Reasons for this substantial increase in food insecurity include reduced supply to food banks and high rates of unemployment. Of those who were unemployed during the pandemic, 31% report food insecurity. On the eve of the COVID-19 pandemic, in 2019, the child poverty rate in the United States was nearly double that of several peer countries, including Canada, South Korea, and Germany.

Food insecurity also increased because of school closures. The National School Lunch Program and School Breakfast Program made up 70% of a child's daily nutrition and served nearly 3 million children. Since these meals are healthier than those from home, children have lower access to nutrition without these programs. Though some schools implemented grab-and-go meals, only 11% of families utilized this because many children who need it have parents who cannot take time off of work or do not have transportation.

The jobs of parents also affect educational outcomes when children have to learn virtually in their house. Without parental involvement, it can be hard for kids to continue learning at or near the level they had in-person. Often, children in poverty have parents who do not have the ability to work at home or take time off to be a teacher for their kids. These children may also have reduced access to technology. Of adults who earn $30,000 or less, only 34% use the internet. This also true for rural communities. This leads to children lagging behind their more wealthy counterparts and associated with higher drop-out rates and lower educational outcomes.

School also provides care services, and for many, it can be the only place to turn to when they need mental health support or necessary care. School is also important in detecting abuse and child maltreatment because teachers and school nurses are often the first line of identification. During the pandemic, there was an increase in reports of injuries signaling increases in child abuse and intimate partner violence (IPV). When children witness IPV, it can affect their relationships in the future. Poverty is also related to rates of COVID-19 infection and deaths. Counties with higher rates of poverty are shown to also have higher rates of infection and mortality due to COVID-19, 3.8 times higher in fact. Also, housing insecurity for children has increased. Before the pandemic, children accounted for 59% of the people experiencing homelessness, and during the pandemic, there was an increase in families becoming homeless with around 400,000 additional beds needed to shelter everyone. Overcrowding and poor plumbing facilities and other conditions are experienced by 15% of families. This can cause greater transmission of the virus and greater mortality.

=== Race ===
Child poverty and race have a distinct correlation with each other. There is a history of racism in the United States with the institution of the slave trade, Jim Crow laws, and the war on crime that incarcerated black men disproportionately. The effects of racism continue to be prevalent in the disparities found in the country and affect minority communities in many different institutions. In fact, poverty in minority communities was not addressed until the 1960s, and until then, the image of poverty was only represented by poor whites. Because racism affects so many aspects of life, the aforementioned effects are also in part caused by it.

As of 2014, around 38% of African-American children were in poverty, compared to only 13% of white children, and minority communities like American Indian and Hispanic/Latino follow closely behind with rates of 36% and 32%, respectively. African-American children are more likely than white children to be in persistent poverty due to multiple generations of discrimination. When accounting for differences in family structure and income levels, black children still persist in higher poverty rates which is evidence that child poverty is driven by racism.

The "war on crime" in the 1960s and the subsequent "war on drugs" in the 1980s caused greater incarceration of black Americans at disproportional rates. Racial profiling played a role in excessive arrests and incarcerations due to drug offenses that majorly impacted black and Latinx communities. This caused many children to grow up in single-parent households, and they were more likely to experience the juvenile and carceral system. This also continues the cycle of poverty by restricting opportunities in the future.

COVID-19 affects races differently as well. Predominantly black counties have three times the infection rate and six times the mortality rate due to COVID-19 compared to predominantly white counties. Overcrowded housing is more common in minority communities, leading to increased spread of the virus. 80% of families in homelessness are non-white, and food insecurity is experienced disproportionately by black and Hispanic households.

==== House ownership ====
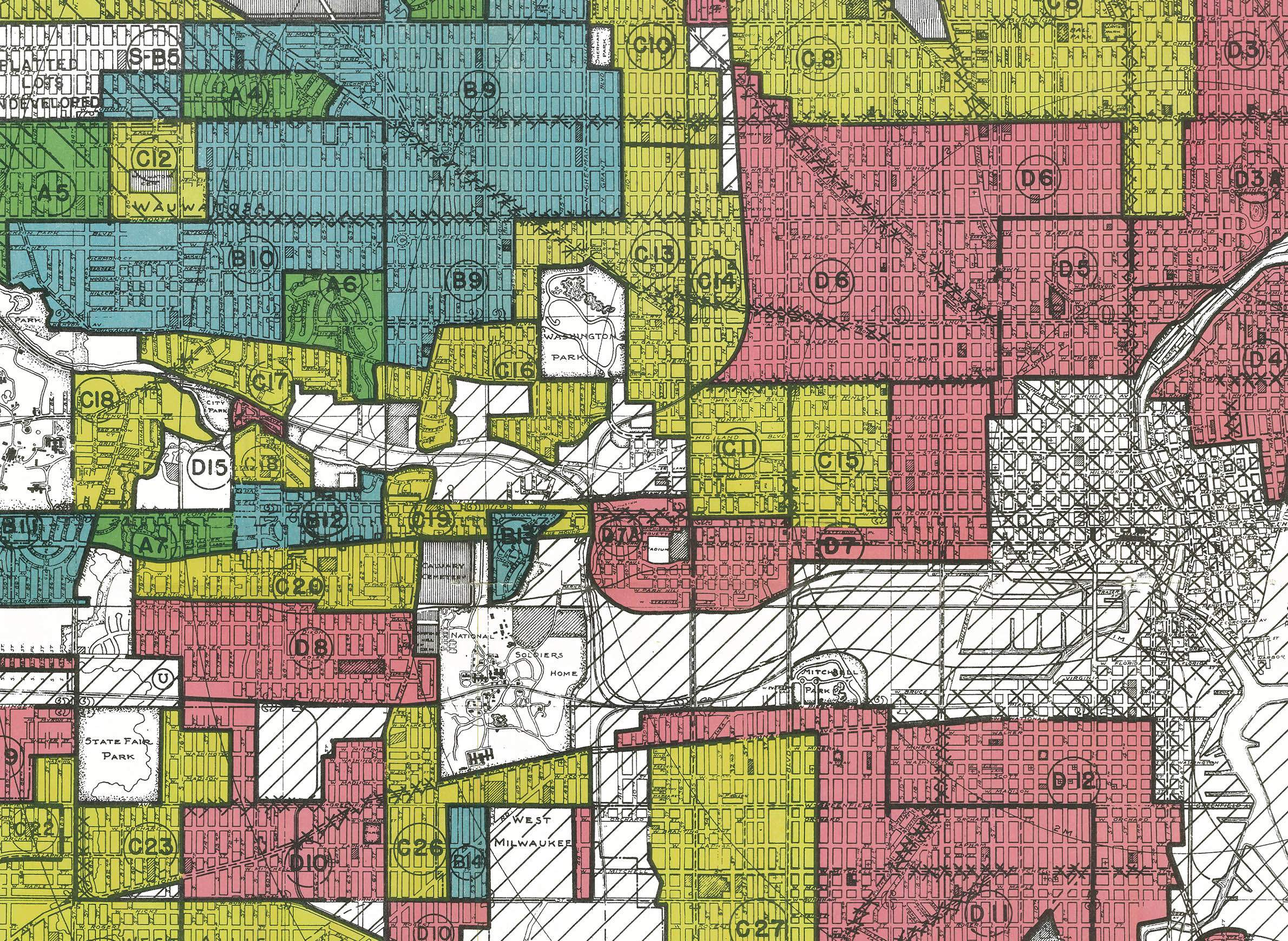
Example of redlining map in Milwaukee

House ownership is a very important factor in child poverty. It provides stability and a path to wealth accumulation. However, for minority communities, especially black families, house ownership is not a realistic possibility due to the high rates and historic discrimination. From the 1930s to the 1970s, the practice of redlining was common. This was used to designate certain neighborhoods as desirable or risky for mortgage lenders. White neighborhoods were almost always rated highly, while non-white communities like immigrants, Jews, Latinx, and blacks were labeled as risky and had a yellow or red label. African-American communities were especially discriminated against because the red label was often only for black neighborhoods. This caused many black communities to have fewer opportunities to move to better housing because the prices would be hiked up to discourage them and lenders would not give money at reasonable rates. While white Americans have house ownership rates of 73%, minority communities have much less around 50-60%, and only 42.1% of black Americans have houses. Because white Americans have had longer and more available house ownership, they accrued wealth over time which is part of the reason for the wealth gap that is present today. This residential divide that has continued throughout history also affects the quality of education available. Public school funding in the United States involves having the community a school serves to provide resources for the school. However, when a community has lower property values and lower income, like many of the previously redlined areas are, their schools are under-resourced to provide quality education. As mentioned in the previous section, this causes a cycle of poverty to occur.

Between 2023 and 2024, the largest increase in homelessness occurred in children under the age of 18, increasing by 33 percent, with 150,000 children experiencing the crisis, according to the data.

== Effects ==
=== Health ===
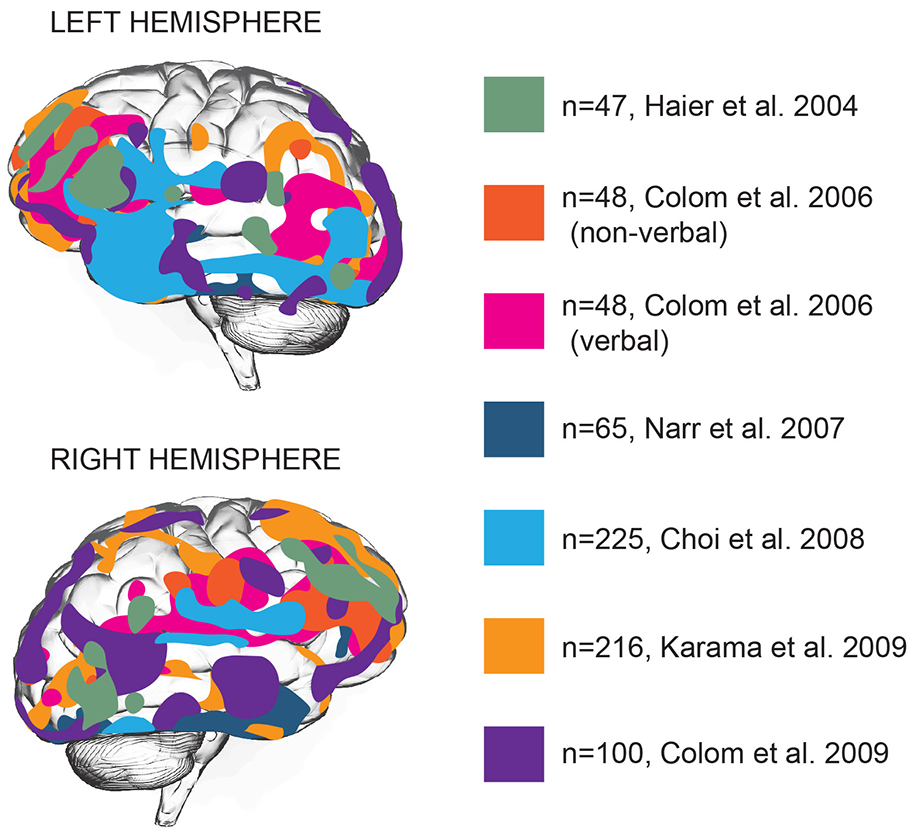
Shows locations of gray matter

Due to poverty, many children suffer from health problems. The infant mortality rate is higher, and children have lower birth weights. This is usually a signal of the in utero environment and the nutrition the fetus gets, and it also may predict future health. The United States is one of the only developed countries that has a high mortality rate. This mortality rate is caused, though, by poor minority births because white, college-educated, and married mothers do have rates that are comparable to Europe's. A study done by neuroscientists shows that children with high socioeconomic status have more gray matter (a crucial part of processing information and regulating behavior) than children in low socioeconomic circumstances. This difference was only seen after nine months, indicating that it was caused by circumstances after birth. This may also affect learning and processing in school which would then affect their future to get a job. Poor children are more likely to have severe chronic diseases like asthma, diabetes, and hearing/vision problems. They may also have food insecurity and a lack of access to nutritional and fresh foods. This may cause malnutrition which contributes to a weaker immune system and less growth. A weaker immune system is also caused by the delayed and lower immunization rates found in children in poverty. Obesity is also a common effect of children in poverty, most probably due to less access to nutritional foods, and this can have complications in the future. Childhood poverty also affects susceptibility to diseases, like cardiovascular disease and cancer, as an adult. These effects of child poverty ultimately contribute to keeping those in poverty where it is difficult for them to break out of the cycle due to the burden of health problems.

Children in poverty also often have trauma, which can cause greater mental health problems like ADHD and mood and anxiety disorders. Mental health disorders in patients in child poverty are actually more prevalent and can affect their life on an everyday spectrum because it may restrict how they interact with others and their opportunities to learn.

=== Other effects ===
There are many effects of child poverty that may or may not coincide with health effects. Food insecurity is an effect that affects many children in poverty. As mentioned before, children may not have access to nutritional food causing malnutrition. They also are shown to have lower educational outcomes, and children from lower socioeconomic backgrounds do worse overall at school. A study shows that children below the poverty line do two years less of an education which causes a ripple effect of fewer opportunities and less income. Education is a direct correlation to future socioeconomic status, and without breaking the cycle of devaluing education, there will continue to be intergenerational poverty. Lower education levels also cause an increase in social effects. Children in poverty often have interactions with criminal activity as an adolescent that continues as an adult, and boys in poverty grow up to be twice as likely to be arrested as adults. Teenage pregnancy is also common for girls who grew up in poverty and are six times as likely to have a child without marriage.

== Efforts against child poverty ==
=== Government intervention ===
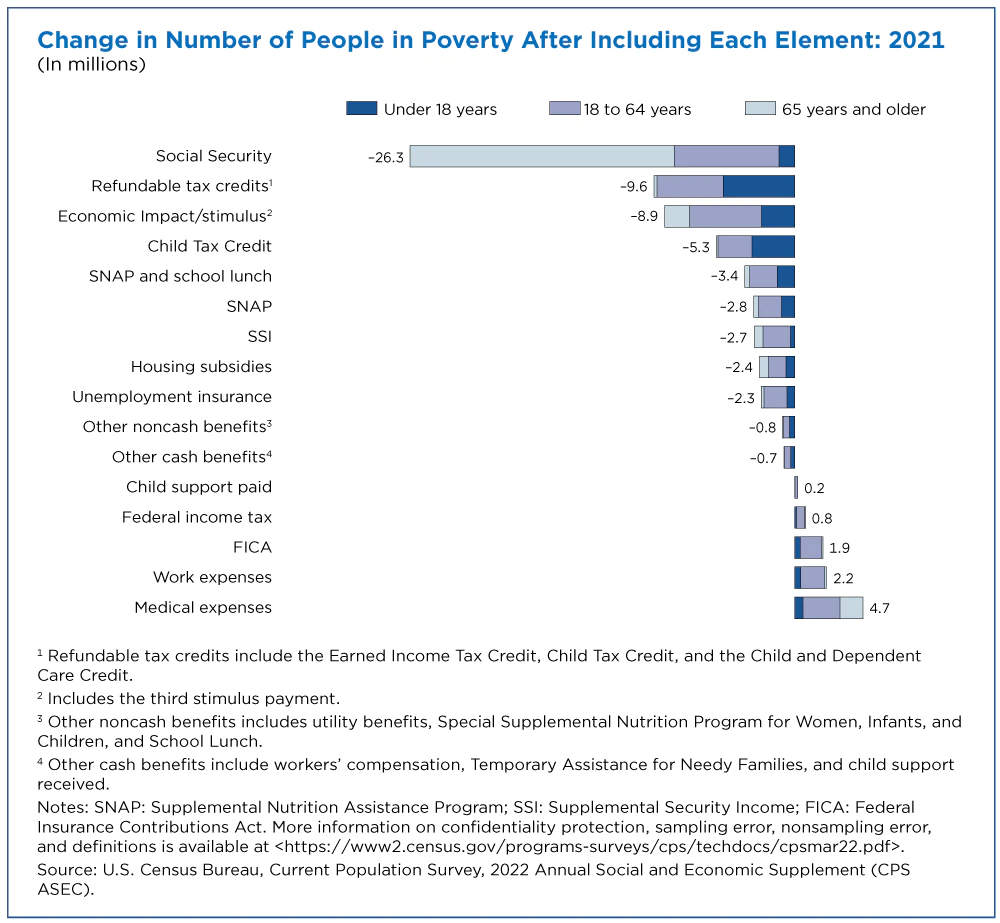

Until the Great Depression hit and poverty increased exponentially, aid for the poor was mostly through private charities. At that time, welfare policies began to take place and the role of the federal government in poverty reduction increased. In the 1960s, the Economic Opportunity Act, also known as the War on Poverty, was passed and since then many programs have targeted poverty, especially child poverty. To cover basic needs, the government has provided assistance programs and tax credits that lower the burden on families.

Aid to Families with Dependent Children (AFDC) gives aid in the form of cash. Later replaced by the Temporary Assistance for Needy Families (TANF), the program is based on income levels and assets. The Supplemental Nutrition Assistance Program (SNAP), once known as food stamps, is a program that provides vouchers for families to spend on food at grocery stores. This decreases food insecurity and is one of the best examples of anti-poverty programs. SNAP is means-tested which means it is based on lower income levels. It is a nearly universal program that benefits everyone meeting income thresholds, including those who do not work. Similar to SNAP benefits, tax credits like the earned income tax credit (EITC) and the child tax credit (CTC) come as in-kind benefits as well. EITC is for low-income households that do have income coming in. If a family's combined income is too low to take taxes out of, they receive refunds from the Internal Revenue Service. The CTC is similar to the EITC, but it does not target low-income families as much. Up to $1000 per child is available as a nonrefundable credit, and single-parent, two-kid households with incomes up to $115,000 and two-parent, two-kid households with incomes up to $150,000 are eligible for this credit.

Both SNAP and tax credits have helped reduce child poverty, improve educational outcomes, and raise employment levels. Medicaid and the Children's Health Insurance Program (CHIP) have provided greater access to healthcare for low-income children, and these programs are a joint effort of the federal and state government. Public health insurance is shown to have lasting effects through adulthood. Along with SNAP, the free or reduced school breakfast and lunch programs and the Special Supplemental Nutrition Program for Women, Infants, and Children (WIC) give more access to healthy, nutritional foods for at-risk populations and during development. In terms of educational policies, Head Start is a federal program that targets early childhood learning and development and stronger parent-child relationships. These government programs and more have been shown to lower child poverty.

A 2025 National Academy of Sciences report concluded that the temporary expansions of the Earned Income Tax Credit (EITC) and Child Tax Credit (CTC) under the American Rescue Plan Act of 2021 lifted more than 2 million children above the poverty line.

=== Community intervention ===
Community intervention is an effective tool to combat child poverty. Community programs often target families and children to lower child poverty. They strive to impact different factors that play into a child's life by addressing the family component. Families that build strong social connections with those around them and similar to them have more resources to utilize. For example, they can use connections to their advantage by having conversations, receiving advice, providing transportation, and getting information about government programs. One example of this is Families and Schools Together (FAST). The program connects families in a school, and it is proven to increase skills in social, academic, and emotional behavior. Making Connections (MC) and Children's Services Council (CSC) are also a program that targets families to decrease child poverty. MC strives to increase a family's income, networks, access to child health, etc., and the CSC aims to facilitate better development of kids through reducing child neglect and abuse, more opportunities for education, and increasing healthy births. A focus on greater educational opportunities combined with family services is also seen in community groups. Harlem Children's Zone addresses child poverty in Harlem by providing educational services like afterschool programs and early childhood education for children and parenting classes and support for families. In healthcare, pediatricians partner with the community to provide services and reach children in Missouri, Colorado, and New York, and there is training for pediatric residents to build community partnerships. From a religious standpoint, organizations affiliated with a religion can also provide services to children and families in poverty. Often, values from a religion support this work by promoting taking care of the poor and providing shelter.

=== Future steps ===
Proper and proportional investment in poor children is important in reducing child poverty. The United States continues to be distinct from similar countries when it comes to child poverty. It consistently spends less on programs targeted at helping children and families. Policies that increase the opportunity to work and generate income are present in countries with similar economic status, but public child care, an example of this, was 0.3% of GDP in the United States compared to the 0.5% average in the Organization for Economic Co-operation and Development (OECD). The progress that had been made during the Great Recession for educational investment and income support has been cut back due to fiscal restraint. By increasing support for these investment programs, child poverty could be significantly impacted. Cash transfers/monthly allowances could also cut child poverty in half quickly by providing $300–400 monthly transfers for each child.

Critics oppose this due to the idea that transfers disincentivize working, but examples of similar programs in Britain and Canada have shown to be successful. Along with cash transfers, other aims should include childcare support, vocational education, the creation of jobs, increased housing subsidies, etc. Restructuring the current system in the United States may also be a worthwhile effort, and this can be accomplished by keeping the major elements but changing specifics like target population, quantity of assistance, and delivery process. Some suggest the federal government provide an income floor for families with children which could happen with the federalization of Medicaid and Aid to Families with Dependent Children (AFDC). Others, however, favor less government intervention by shifting responsibilities like education completely to the state. Reforming the current tax system could also help poor families, and it has been debated in the Senate. Medical-financial partnerships (MFP) have recently gained traction and have the potential to impact the health of poor children. Financial stress affects a large portion of the population with over half of families being income or asset poor. MFPs connect healthcare to broad financial services like financial coaching and tax preparation. Other services can also be considered if it provides information for financial stability. An example of this is food pantries that provide information about financial stability. Because healthcare providers reach 90% of the families of preschool -age children, compared to only 12% in daycare, MFPs can decrease child poverty in a larger audience by increasing financial stability which will increase positive health outcomes.

== See also ==
- Youth in the United States
- Poverty and health in the United States
- Build Back Better Act
- Child poverty in Canada
