= Young Lives =

International research project on childhood poverty

Young Lives is an international research project on childhood poverty that was established in 2000 and is coordinated by a team based at the University of Oxford's Department of International Development (Queen Elizabeth House), Great Britain.

Young Lives, by its declaration, is tracing the changing lives of 12,000 children in Ethiopia, India (Andhra Pradesh), Peru, and Vietnam over a 20-year period. This is the time frame set by the UN to assess progress towards the Millennium Development Goals. Through interviews, group work and case studies with the children, their parents, teachers, community representatives and others, the project is collecting information not only about their material and social circumstances, but also their perspectives on their lives and aspirations for the futures, set against the environmental and social realities of their communities.

Young Lives is following two groups of children in each country:

- 2,000 children who were born in 2001-02
- 1,000 children who were born in 1994-95.

These groups provide insights into every phase of childhood. The younger children are being tracked from infancy to their mid-teens and the older children through adulthood, when some will become parents themselves. When this is matched with information gathered about their parents, it is possible to reveal much about the inter generational transmission of poverty, how families on the margins move in and out of poverty, and the policies that can make a real difference to their lives.

The research concentrates on four countries: Ethiopia, India (Andhra Pradesh), Peru, and Vietnam, chosen because they reflect a wide range of cultural, political, geographical and social contexts. They face some of the common issues experienced by developing countries, such as high debt burden, post-conflict reconstruction, and adverse environmental conditions such as drought and flood. By covering these countries, Young Lives aims to reveal patterns, commonalities and differences in four very different contexts where childhood - especially childhood poverty - is changing.

The project is core-funded by the UK Department for International Development (DFID), with sub-studies funded by International Development Research Center (IDRC) (in Ethiopia), UNICEF (in India), Irish Aid (in Vietnam), and the Bernard van Leer Foundation (in India and Peru).

== Declared objectives ==
- provide good-quality information about the lives of children in different contexts;
- identify ways poverty affects children’s lives and their future prospects;
- better understand how poverty is transferred from one generation to another;
- trace linkages between key policy changes and children’s well-being;
- promote effective and sustainable poverty reduction policies;
- build capacity for and understanding of longitudinal research in the four study countries.
