= Social issues in Vietnam =

The primary social issues in Vietnam are rural and child poverty.

Vietnam scores 37.6 in the Gini coefficient index of wealth inequality, with the top 10% accounting for 30.2% of the nation's income and the bottom 10% receiving 3.2%. In 2008, 14% of the population lived below the national poverty line of US$1.15 per day.

== Rural poverty ==
Poverty rate by rural-urban residence, 1993-2004 (percent)
	1993	1998	2002	2004
Rural	66.4	45.5	35.6	25
Urban	25.1	9.2	6.6	3.6

Gross Domestic Product grew at an average of 7.5% from 2000 to 2008. The country was able to reduce poverty fate from 58.1% in the 1990s to 14% in 2008. While the country grows and overall poverty drops, urban dwellers benefitted more than their rural counterparts and a wide income disparity grew between the rich and poor. The regions with the highest relative poverty include the north-west, north-central, central highlands, central coast and north-east.

These regions do not offer the resources to conduct agricultural activities, the main source of income. The poorest rural people live in remote areas with small plots of low quality land that is unsuitable for farming. Similarly, people living along the coastline are faced with harsh climate conditions that restrict farming.

== Child poverty ==
Child poverty rate in Vietnam, 1993-2004 (percent)
	1993	1998	2002	2004
Child Poverty Rate	65.2	46.4	36.4	26.7
National Poverty Rate	58.1	37.9	28.9	19.5

Child poverty declined from 65.2% in 1993 to 26.7% in 2004. The Survey on Household Living Standards data set from 2008 showed that 1 in 3 children in Vietnam were poor. Despite the drop, child poverty remained much higher than the national poverty rate. Many children lacked access to the basic necessities of food, water, education and sanitation, especially in rural areas.

The government and United Nations Children's Fund (UNICEF) developed a multidimensional approach to tackle child poverty. Jesper Morch, UNICEF Representative in Vietnam, said "If children grow up in poverty, they are more likely to be poor in adulthood as well. Reducing child poverty will, therefore, not only improve children's lives today, but also contribute to reducing adult poverty in the long run".
