= CBN =

CBN, or cbn, may refer to:

== Broadcasting organizations ==
- ABS-CBN Corporation, a Philippine media company
  - Chronicle Broadcasting Network, an older name for the media company mentioned above
  - ABS-CBN, the namesake media network
- Radio stations in St. John's, Newfoundland:
  - CBN (AM), CBC Radio One
  - CBN-FM, CBC Music
- CBN (Australian TV station), a TV station in southern New South Wales, Australia
- Central Brasileira de Notícias, a Brazilian radio network
- Christian Broadcasting Network, United States
- Caribbean Broadcast Network, British Virgin Islands
- Commonwealth Broadcasting Network, Canada

== Other organizations ==
- Central Bank of Nigeria
- Canadian Bank Note Company, security printers
- China Business Network, Chinese media company
- Colorado Badged Network, a Colorado cannabis industry organization
- Compal Broadband Networks, a brand of Compal Electronics

== Academic and education ==
- Convent Bukit Nanas, a Malaysian all-girls school

== People ==
- N. Chandrababu Naidu (born 1950), Indian politician

== Science, technology, and medicine ==
- Chemical, biological, or nuclear (warfare or defence): types of weapon of mass destruction
  - Related terms: NRBC (nuclear, radiological, biological, and chemical); CBRN (chemical, biological, radiological, and nuclear); NBC (nuclear, biological, and chemical)
- Cannabinol, a mildly psychoactive cannabinoid from the Cannabis plant
- Cubic boron nitride, a high-hardness material useful for abrasive cutting and for coatings for machine parts
- Certified Bariatric Nurse, one of many nursing credentials and certifications

== Transportation ==
- CBN, the IATA code for Penggung Airport, West Java, Indonesia
- CBN, the MTR code for Causeway Bay North station, Hong Kong
- CBN, the National Rail code for Camborne railway station, Cornwall, UK
- CBN, station code for Cibinong railway station, Indonesia

== Places ==
- Conception Bay North, the north shore of Conception Bay (Canada) in Newfoundland
