= BNC =

BNC may refer to:

== Science and technology ==
- Binucleated cells
- BNC connector (Bayonet Neill–Concelman), a type of RF coaxial cable jack
- BNC (software), (abbreviation of Bounced Network Connection) an IRC program functioning as a proxy between an IRC client and a type of computer network proxy redirector
- Biological, Nuclear, Chemical, types of weapons of mass destruction

== Businesses and organizations ==
- Black News Channel, a cable news and current affairs channel in Tallahassee, Florida, US
- Ballet Nouveau Colorado, a contemporary ballet company based in Broomfield, Colorado, US
- BNC Bank, also called Bank of North Carolina, a former bank based in High Point, North Carolina, US
- Banque Nationale du Canada or National Bank of Canada
- Berkeley Nucleonics Corporation, a US manufacturer of precision electronic instrumentation
- Bernama News Channel, a news and current affairs channel in Malaysia, formerly known as Bernama TV
- Bethany Nazarene College, the former name of Southern Nazarene University
- Biblioteca Nacional de Chile, National Library of Chile
- Bilyonaryo News Channel, a news and current affairs channel in the Philippines
- Bindura Nickel Corporation, a Zimbabwe mining company, a subsidiary of Mwana Africa plc
- Banco Nacional de Crédito or Banco Nacional de Crédito, based in Caracas, Venezuela
- Brasenose College, Oxford, a constituent college of the University of Oxford
- Bollack Netter and Co (Bollack, Netter, et Cie), a French automobile company producing lightweight cars from 1922 until 1935
- Telesta Therapeutics, as a former Toronto Stock Exchange trading symbol
- Brand New Congress, a US political action committee

== Other uses ==
- Bangalore Cantonment, a railway station in Bangalore, India
- BNI City railway station, a railway station in Jakarta, Indonesia
- Bangor New Cemetery, Northern Irish cemetery
- Beni Airport (IATA airport code), in the Democratic Republic of the Congo
- Beth Nielsen Chapman, singer-songwriter and composer
- British National Corpus, a corpus of written and spoken English
- Mitchell Camera, Mitchell NC/BNC ("Newsreel Camera"/"Blimped Newsreel Camera")
