= National Child Benefit =

Canadian child poverty benefit

The Canadian National Child Benefit (NCB) initiative aims to help children living in poverty. The program is a partnership between federal, provincial and territorial governments and First Nations in Canada. The federal government provides monthly payments to low-income families with children, and the others design and deliver benefits and services to meet the needs of families with children in each jurisdiction.

== See also ==
- Child poverty in Canada
