= Penggung Airport =

Airport serving Cirebon, West Java, Indonesia

Penggung Airport Cakrabhuwana Airport Bandar Udara Penggung Bandar Udara Cakrabhuwana
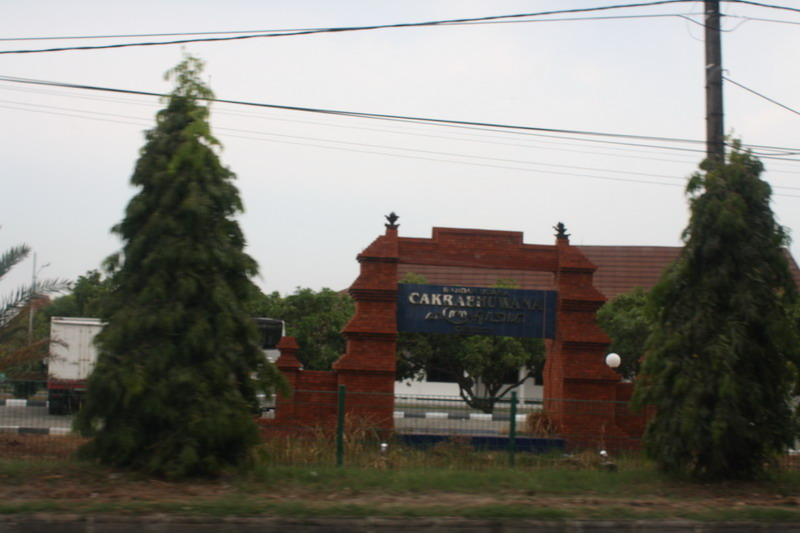
- IATA: CBN; ICAO: WICD

Summary
- Airport type: Public / Military
- Operator: Cirebon City Government
- Serves: Cirebon
- Location: Penggung, Cirebon, West Java, Indonesia
- Elevation AMSL: 89 ft / 27 m
- Coordinates: 06°45′22.12″S 108°32′22.82″E

Map
- Location of airport in Java

Runways
Direction	Length		Surface
Direction	m	ft	Surface
04/22	1,259	4,131	Asphalt

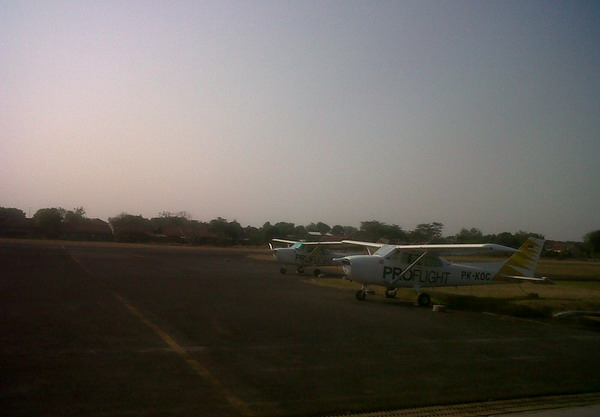
Planes at Cakrabhuwana Airport

Penggung Airport or Cakrabhuwana Airport (IATA: CBN, ICAO: WICD) is a small airport located in Penggung, Cirebon, West Java, Indonesia.
