= Rinker School of Construction Management =

Program at the University of Florida

Coordinates: 29.6470°N 82.3432°W

- Type: Public
- Established: 1935
- Parent institution: College of Design, Construction and Planning
- Affiliations: University of Florida
- Director: Robert F. Cox
- Location: Gainesville, Florida, United States
- Website: dcp.ufl.edu/rinker/

The Rinker School of Construction Management is a department-level school within the College of Design, Construction and Planning at the University of Florida.

== History ==
Established in 1935, the M. E. Rinker Sr. School of Construction Management is one of the oldest building construction management program in the country.

Rinker Hall is the first building in Florida to receive a LEED Gold certification from the U.S. Green Building Council.

As part of the university's College of Design, Construction, and Planning, the school's name was officially changed from the M. E. Rinker Sr. School of Building Construction to the M. E. Rinker Sr. School of Construction Management in 2014.

== Undergraduate program ==
=== Admissions ===
The admissions process for Rinker's undergraduate program is competitive. The School of Construction Management accepts the top 60 students each fall and spring semester for undergraduate studies, based on grade point average. The Rinker School has over 6500 graduates (5700 BS, 870 MS, and 45 PhD), 250 upper division students, 120 Master's students, 30 PhD students, 21 faculty, and 13 support staff.

=== Academics ===
Undergraduate students are also given a general business administration education to complement their construction management concentration.
