= City National Bank =

City National Bank can refer to:

== Banks ==
- City National Bank (California), a bank headquartered in Los Angeles
- City National Bank (New Jersey), a former bank headquartered in Newark, closed in 2019
- City National Bank of Florida, a bank headquartered in Miami
- City National Bank (West Virginia), a bank headquartered in Charleston, West Virginia
- City National Bank, a former bank headquartered in Evansville, Indiana, rebranded Integra Bank in 2000
- City National Bank and Trust Company, a former bank headquartered in Gloversville, New York, acquired by NBT Bank in 2006
- Bank One Corporation, originally chartered as City National Bank of Ohio
- City National Bank and Trust Company of Battle Creek (Battle Creek, Michigan), a former bank headquartered in Battle Creek, Michigan, acquired by Michigan National Bank in the 1940s

== Buildings ==
- City National Bank (Tuscaloosa, Alabama), designed by William Leslie Welton
- City National Bank (Galveston, Texas), which has also housed Moody National Bank and the Galveston County Historical Museum
- City National Bank Building, Mason City, Iowa, part of the Park Inn Hotel complex designed by Frank Lloyd Wright
- City National Bank Building (Houston), designed by Alfred C. Finn
- City National Bank Building (Miami, Florida)
- City National Bank Building (Omaha), also known as the Orpheum Tower
- City National Bank Tower, part of the City National Plaza in Los Angeles
- City National Bank Building (Battle Creek, Michigan), a now-demolished building in Battle Creek, Michigan, built in 1916
