= Child poverty =

Children living in poverty

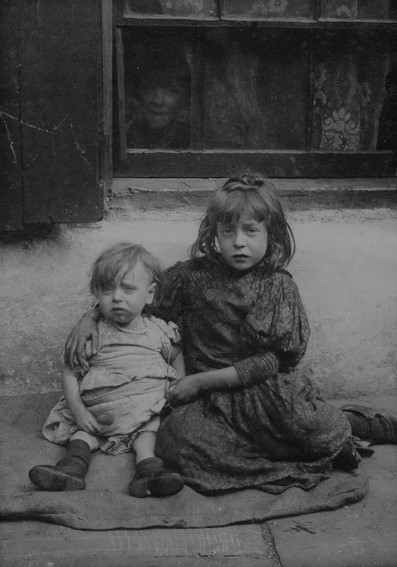
Two sisters sit on the slum streets of Spitalfields, London, circa 1903.

Child poverty refers to the state of children living in poverty and applies to children from poor families and orphans being raised with limited or no state resources. UNICEF estimates that 356 million children live in extreme poverty. It is estimated that 1 billion children (about half of all children worldwide) lack at least one essential necessity such as housing, regular food, or clean water. Children are more than twice as likely to live in poverty as adults and the poorest children are twice as likely to die before the age of 5 compared to their wealthier peers.

== Definition ==
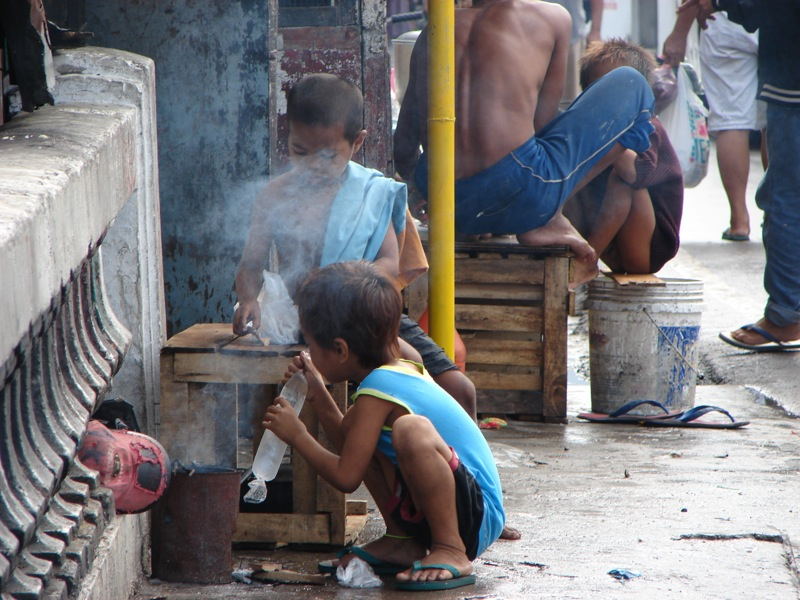
Street children in the Philippines

The definition of children in most countries is "people under the age of eighteen". Culturally defining the end of childhood is more complex, and takes into account factors such as the commencement of work, end of schooling and marriage as well as class, gender and race.

The United Nations Children's Fund (UNICEF) defines children living in poverty as those that "experience deprivation of the material, spiritual and emotional resources needed to survive, develop and thrive, leaving them unable to enjoy their rights, achieve their full potential or participate as full and equal members of society."

The ChildFund International (CFI) definition is based on Deprivation (lack of materialistic conditions and services), Exclusion (denial of rights and safety) and Vulnerability (when society can not deal with threats to children). Other charitable organisations also use this multi-dimensional approach to child poverty, defining it as a combination of economic, social, cultural, physical, environmental and emotional factors. These definitions suggest child poverty is multidimensional, relative to their current and changing living conditions and complex interactions of the body, mind and emotions are involved.

== Measuring child poverty ==
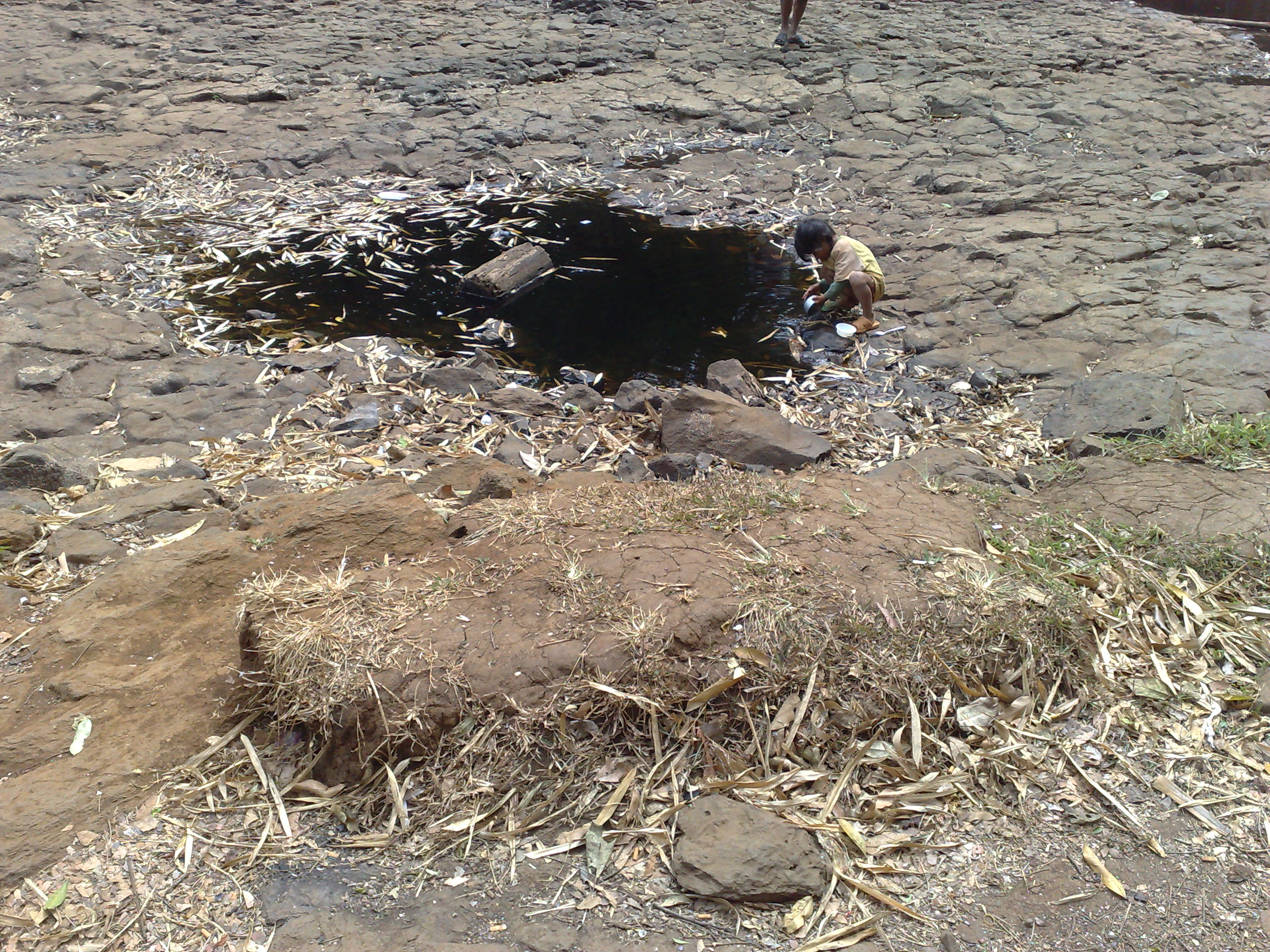
A boy washes cutlery in a pool of filthy water in Cambodia

The easiest way to quantify child poverty is by setting an absolute or relative monetary threshold. If a family does not earn above that threshold, the children of that family will be considered to live below the poverty line. Absolute poverty thresholds are fixed and generally updated only for price changes, but relative poverty thresholds are developed with reference to the actual income of the population and reflect changes in consumption. The absolute poverty threshold is the money needed to purchase a defined quantity of goods and services, and every threshold generally reflects the minimum income required to acquire necessities of life. However, a caveat is that as a family that earns above a set threshold may still choose to not spend on the need of their children. Certain organizations, such as the World Bank and the International Monetary Fund, use the absolute poverty threshold of US$1 a day to measure poverty in developing countries. Since the 1960s, the US has used an absolute poverty threshold adjusted for family size and composition to determine those living in poverty.

Europe and many other developed countries use a relative poverty threshold, typically 50% of the countries' median income. Relative poverty does not necessarily mean the child is lacking anything, but is more a reflection of inequality in society. Child poverty, when measured using relative thresholds, will improve only if low-income families benefit more from economic advances than well-off families. Measures of child poverty using income thresholds will vary depending on whether relative or absolute poverty is measured and what threshold limits are applied. Using a relative measure, poverty is much higher in the US than in Europe, but if an absolute measure is used, d without discrimination.

A 2003 study conducted by researchers out of Bristol attempted to provide a scientific basis for measuring severe deprivation based on levels of adequate nutrition, safe drinking water, decent sanitation facilities, health, shelter, education, and information. Measurable values were attributed to each indicator and these were used to establish how many children were living in poverty. The values included: heights and weights more than 3 deviations below the international median, children with access only to rivers and other surface water, no access to toilets, no immunisations, no access to medical advice, living in dwellings with more than five people per room, no school attendance and no access to newspapers or other media. Out of a population of 1.8 billion children from developing nations, 56% were below at least one of these measurements. In Sub-Saharan Africa and Southern Asia, this number increased to over 80%, with the rural children from these areas the worst affected.

The Young Lives Project is investigating the changing nature of child poverty by following nearly 12,000 children for 15 years in four countries (Ethiopia, Peru, Vietnam and India), chosen to reflect a wide range of cultural, political, geographical and social contexts. Every three to four years, researchers will collect data on the children and their families health, malnutrition, literacy, access to services and other indicators of poverty. Reports are available for these four countries that comparing the initial data obtained in 2002 with data from 2006. Peru, Vietnam and India have shown economic growth and a reduction in poverty over this time, but large inequalities still exist between rural and urban areas, and among ethnic groups. This is particularly obvious in India, a country with the second largest population of billionaires but also home to 25% of the world's poor. Ethiopia, one of the poorest countries in the world, has also shown slight economic growth and reduction in poverty. Inequalities still exist, with boys more likely to be malnourished than girls and more absolute poverty in rural areas, although relative poverty is higher in urban areas. This data was collected before the 2008 drought and the recent increase in food prices, which have had a severe impact on the ability of Ethiopia to feed its population.

=== Capability approach and the Child Development Index ===
Recently, debate among philosophers and theorists on how to define and measure poverty stems from the emergence of the human capability approach, where poverty is defined by Hi Kos extent of freedoms that a person possesses. Amartya Sen, the creator of the capability approach, argues that there are five fundamental freedoms that should be available to all humans: political freedoms, economic facilities, social opportunities, transparency guarantees, and protective security. He also suggests that they are all interconnected, where each freedom fosters and/or enhances the others.

Additionally, the capability approach claims that development should be considered a process of expanding freedoms or removing the major sources of unfreedom rather than a focus on narrower measurements such as growth of gross national product, per capita income, or industrialization. According to ILO's basic needs approach (which in most aspects is quite like the capability approach), the objective of development should be to provide all humans with the opportunity to a full life, which goes beyond abstractions such as money, income, or employment. Therefore, the definition and measurement of poverty in general must extend beyond measurements like per capita GDP, which tools such as the Human Development Index attempt to accomplish.

In light of this, a UK initiative, Save the Children, has also developed a measurement of child poverty based on measures of capability, called the Child Development Index (CDI). CDI is an index that combines performance measures specific to children – primary education, child health, and child nutrition – to produce a score on a scale of 0 to 100, with zero being the best with higher scores indicating worse performances. According to Save the Children, each of the indicators was chosen because it was easily accessible, universally understood, and clearly indicative of child wellbeing. Health measures under-five mortality rate; nutrition measures the percentage of children under five who are moderately or severely underweight (which is two standard deviations below the median weight for age of the reference population); and education measures the percentage of primary school-age children that are not enrolled in school. In terms of opportunities and capabilities, CDI is the most appropriate measurement of child poverty.

Of the estimated 2.2 billion children worldwide, about a billion, or every second child, live in poverty. Of the 1.9 billion children in developing nations, 640 million are without adequate shelter; 400 million are without access to safe water; 270 million have no access to health services. In 2003, 10.6 million children died before reaching the age of five, which is equivalent to the total child population of France, Germany, Greece, and Italy. 1.4 million die each year from lack of access to safe drinking water and adequate sanitation while 2.2 million die each year due to lack of immunizations.

The Child Development Index also illustrates relative child poverty compared across all regions of the world (see Measuring child poverty).

- World performance: CDI = 17.5
- Africa: CDI = 34.5
- Middle East/North Africa: CDI = 11.2
- Central/East Europe and Central Asia: CDI = 9.2
- South Asia: CDI = 26.4
- East Asia: CDI = 8.5
- Latin America and Caribbean: CDI = 6.8
- Developed Countries: CDI = 2.1

The CDI in Africa is twice that of the world average, and South Asia also fares poorly in relation to the global performance. In contrast, the CDI in developed countries is one-ninth of the world CDI, indicating a clear distinction between developing and developed nations.

However, in 2013, child poverty reached record high levels in the United States, with 16.7 million children, more than 20%, living in food insecure households. 47 million Americans depend on food banks, more than 30% above 2007 levels. Households headed by single mothers are most likely to be affected. Worst affected are the District of Columbia, Oregon, Arizona, New Mexico and Florida, while North Dakota, New Hampshire, Virginia, Minnesota and Massachusetts are the least affected. More recently in 2021, it is estimated that nearly 11 million children live in poverty in the US, making up almost one-third of all people living in poverty in the country.

== Child poverty rate by country ==
Proportion of children in poverty (2018)
Country	Children in poverty
Israel	22.2%
Chile	21.5%
United States	21.2%
Mexico	19.8%
Spain	19.3%
China	19%
Italy	18.7%
Hungary	16.9%
Lithuania	16.5%
Luxembourg	16%
Greece	13.9%
Australia *	13.3%
Slovakia	12.4%
United Kingdom	12.4%
South Korea	12.3%
Portugal	12.2%
Switzerland	12%
Canada *	11.8%
France	11.7%
Germany	11.3%
Netherlands	10.9%
Latvia	10.5%
Estonia	10.3%
Austria	9.6%
Belgium	9.2%
Sweden	9%
Ireland	8.6%
Norway	8.1%
Poland	7.4%
Czech Republic	6.4%
Slovenia	5.9%
Iceland	5.4%
Denmark	4.7%
Finland	3.5%

== Causes ==
There are many theories about what causes childhood poverty. The majority of poverty-stricken children are born to poor parents. Therefore, the causes of adult poverty including government policies, lack of education, unemployment, social services, disabilities and discrimination significantly affect the presence of child poverty. Lack of parental economic resources such as disposable income restricts children's opportunities. Economic and demographic factors such as deindustrialization, globalization, residential segregation, labor market segmentation, and migration of middle-class residents from inner cities, constrain economic opportunities and choices across generation, isolating inner city poor children.

The decline of the nuclear family, illegitimacy, teen pregnancy, and increased numbers of single mothers, is also cited as a major cause of poverty and welfare dependency for women and their children. Children resulting from unintended pregnancies are more likely to live in poverty; raising a child requires significant resources, so each additional child increases demands on parental resources. Families raised by a single parent are generally poorer than those raised by couples. In the United States, 6 of 10 long term poor children have spent time in single-parent families and in 2007, children living in households headed by single mothers were five times as likely as children living in households headed by married parents to be living in poverty.

Many of the apparent negative associations between growing up poor and children's attainments reflect unmeasured parental advantages that positively affect both parents' incomes and children's attainments, like parental depression.

=== Behavioral theories ===
It has been theorized that a great deal of childhood poverty is caused by choices, incentives, and the cultural beliefs of their parents. For example, factors like single motherhood, low education, and especially unemployment are associated with poverty. There has been extensive research on which incentives shape behavior to produce less poverty. The effects of poverty such as cognitive burden, bias, and stress are known to encourage behavior that perpetuates poverty, for example by reducing educational attainment or not investing in insurance. There is strong evidence that growing up in poverty feeds back into behavior that increases the chance of poverty for the next generation. Some attribute these tendencies to culture or problematic incentives, though the relationship between poverty and behaviors is not well-established. For example, single motherhood is associated with childhood poverty, especially in developing countries. However, in 19 of 29 rich democracies, single parenthood is not significantly associated with childhood poverty. In the U.S., the association between single motherhood and poverty has been falling since the 1970s, and childhood poverty is now much more closely associated with parental employment than marriage status. The 1996 welfare reforms in the U.S. were shown to increase employment and reduce dependence on welfare by single parents, but did not have any measurable effect on single motherhood. International studies in developing countries find no effect between conditional vs unconditional cash aid on future employment.

=== Structural theories ===
Economic and demographic contexts have been shown to increase poverty directly, as well as change parent behavior in ways that increase poverty. For example, local economic growth and development, state of industrialization, and spatial or skills mismatches can all affect poverty directly by limiting the opportunity for employment. Demographics are also correlated with poverty, including neighborhood disadvantage, residential segregation, age/sex composition, or living in a rural area.

Structural effects seem to vary across time and place and research often comes to contradictory conclusions. For example, urbanization in rich countries is often associated with displacing the poorest members of the community, which increases their average poverty levels. However, in developing countries, local economic growth is more often associated with reducing poverty of the most poor.

=== Political theories ===
Institutions and power can lead to policy that tends to increase or decrease childhood poverty irrespective of local culture or current behaviors. Power resource theory is one of the most popular political explanations for poverty. Since elites and businesses are typically favored in the distribution or political power in a capitalist democracy, less advantaged groups may gain political power by mobilizing together (for example for labor unions or voting). In the United States, working poverty is lower in states that have higher levels of unionization. Country-wide poverty tends to be lower when there is greater unionization, a higher proportion of women in parliament, and when the government of a stable democracy is controlled by Left-wing parties. The effects of leftist politics appear to have a much larger effect on poverty levels than structural factors or individual behavior.

Another political theory focuses on institutions. Institutionalists claim that poverty is caused by how institutions (such as laws or regulations) affect the long-term distribution of resources. One piece of evidence is that poverty rates do not respond quickly to changes in power or elections, and instead are relatively stable and slow-moving. Some historical institutions tend to lock in poverty, and these institutions are rarely changed significantly by contemporary politics. In this theory, governments shape poverty by organizing resource distribution (taxes and transfers), providing insurance against risks (or not), investing in capabilities like education or health services, creating opportunities like public employment, and discipline of the poor (for example, parental incarceration is associated with increased childhood homelessness). There is a closer relationship between poverty and behaviors like single motherhood in weak welfare states compared to generous welfare states like Denmark which have no correlation between single motherhood and poverty. However, the effects of Left parties and unions on poverty seems to be diminishing over time.

Most children in poverty have poor parents and typically do not receive adequate education, care, or nutrition. Some children are affected by disease, injury, negative cultural influences, or other hazards outside their control. Because a child has no control over their parenting, health, or where they are born, it has been said that luck has a large effect on a child's chance of living in poverty.

=== Cycle of poverty ===
The cycle of poverty is when a family remains in poverty over many successive generations. For this reason reducing child poverty has been a focus of many governments as a way to break this cycle. Improving the quality of education is generally seen as the most effective way to break this cycle, especially the education of young children before they reach 3rd grade. Studies show that kids who test below grade level when they enter Kindergarten are at much greater risk of poor future educational attainment, and kids that are still behind in grade 3 generally never catch up. Improving the environment the child grows up in, ensuring access to health, and providing financial incentives (either through benefit schemes or reducing taxes) have all been suggested as ways to break the cycle.

Some have noted that U.S. schools are more segregated now than they have been since the 1960s, which may be contributing to the cycle of poverty by concentrating the poorest kids together in schools that are typically underfunded. Studies show that children whose parents went to an integrated school for 5 or more years are 10% more likely to graduate high school.

Boys and girls have equal rates of poverty through their childhoods but as women enter their teens and childbearing years the rates of poverty between the genders widens. Globally, women are far more impoverished than men and poor children are more likely to live in female-headed households. Attempts to combat the cycle of poverty, therefore, have often targeted mothers as a way to interrupt the negative patterns of poverty that affect the education, nutrition/health, and psychological/social outcomes for poor children.

=== COVID-19 ===
UNICEF reported that 100 million children fell into poverty due to the COVID-19 pandemic, causing a 10% increase in childhood poverty between 2019 and 2021.

As a result of the COVID-19 pandemic, children across the globe were removed from their in-person classrooms due to school closures and began remote learning from home. In the United States and European countries, the closure of schools meant that children living in poverty who were experiencing food insecurity at home were not able to receive the daily school lunches that they would otherwise receive when attending school. The loss of schools as a resource for resolving food insecurity not only has an effect on children's physical hunger, but also has a negative effect on educational attainment and mental health for children from low socioeconomic backgrounds.

Research by the Grattan Institute of Australia found that the equity gap was widened by school closures during the COVID-19 pandemic, especially for children experiencing poverty who had limited access to electronic devices and internet connections to attend school remotely. Research also found that children from disadvantaged families in Australia reported feelings of anxiety, stress, and helplessness as a result of their family's hardships.

The effects of the COVID-19 pandemic were felt worldwide and children living in poverty were affected in numerous ways, including physically, psychologically, and emotionally.

== Effect ==
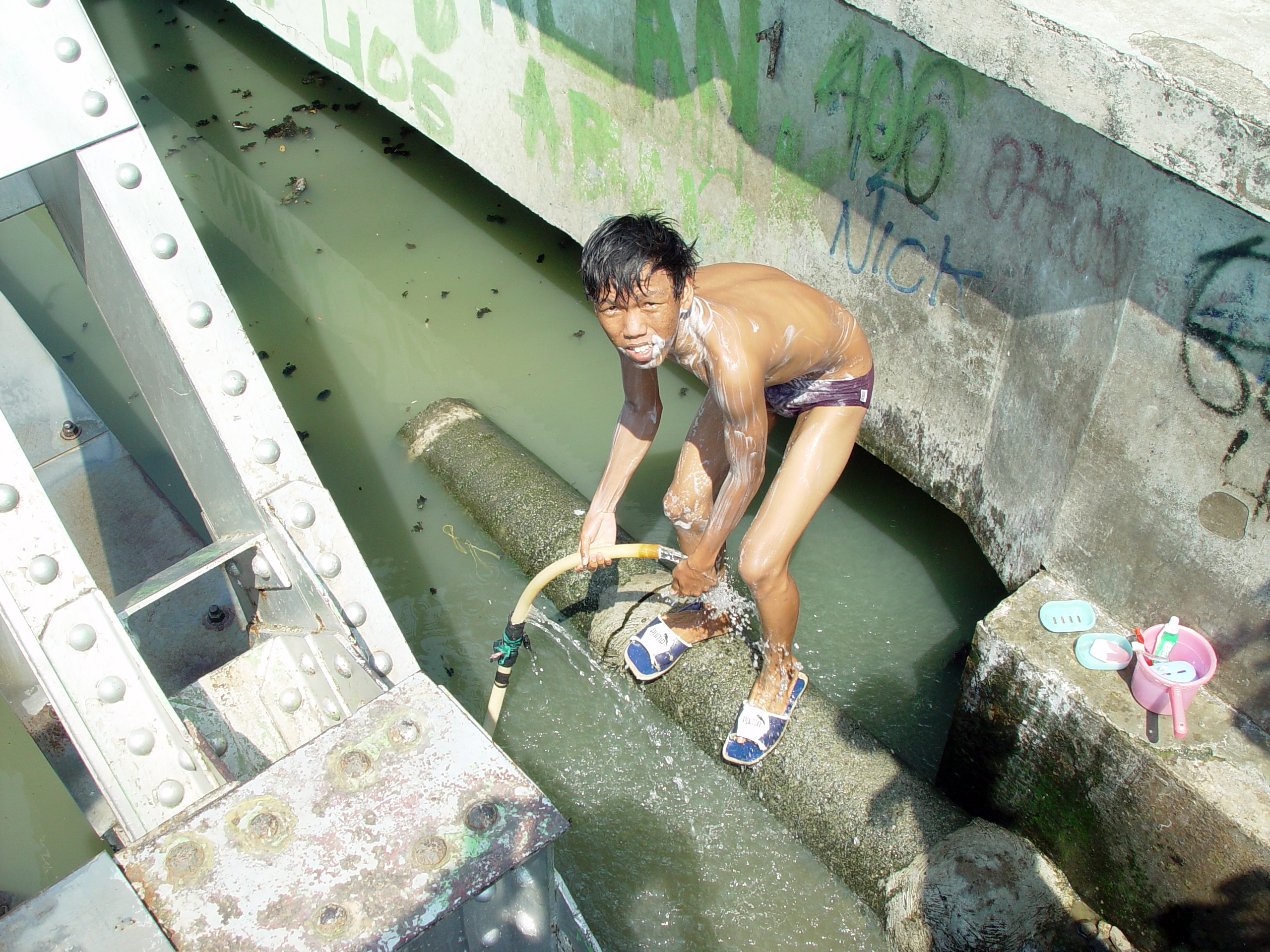
A boy bathes in a polluted river in Jakarta, Indonesia.

The effect of child poverty differs based on the social-economic-geographic aspects.

The direct effect of child poverty are:

- Poor physical health
- Effect on mental development and mental health of the child (such as low self esteem)
- Chances of being part of skilled labour is very low
- Experience a highly deprived and isolated life at a very tender age

=== Poverty Effects on Adolescents ===
In 2017, it was estimated that in the United States, nearly 9 million children were living in poverty, and only 16% of those children were able to advance into a higher income level. Children born into poverty are not always doomed to live poor the rest of their lives but unfortunately their odds of rising into a higher income level are lower. People in low-income families are less likely to have access to higher education opportunities. As teens, they may be forced into the workforce as early as 15 in order to provide for either themselves or the rest of their family, which can lead to early stress-related mental health issues such as anxiety and depression. Financial hardships may keep parents occupied, to the point that they do not realize that their child is struggling in school. Having little to no attention from constantly working parents can create an environment where an adolescent has no parental guidance; some teens may unfortunately turn to drugs, sex, or delinquency. Not having the motivation, grades or access to funds to pay for college can prevent adolescents from obtaining a more financially secure career, leaving them to work low income jobs. Cycled poverty takes over at this point. That adolescent is now an adult included in the other 37.2 million people reported living in poverty in 2020.

Stigmatization of living in poverty can also be detrimental to children's mental well-being and the development of personal identity. Children from poorer families experience embarrassment from not being able to afford brand-name clothing items, electronic devices, substantial housing, or taking part in costly social activities that are financially unfeasible. These children can become isolated when their families decide to remove themselves publicly from their communities to avoid the humiliation and shame of their socioeconomic status and inability to provide a comfortable living both physically, emotionally, and mentally for their children. Children and young adults often develop strategies to manage their family's financial hardships, including coping strategies to help support their family via resourcefulness as well as finding ways to deal psychologically with their lack of access to resources and excessive expenditure of mental and physical energy on stress and anxiety.

=== Developed countries ===
Developed countries also have a serious problem with child poverty. If all the 16.7 million poor children in America were gathered in one place, they would form a city bigger than New York. Many published studies have demonstrated strong associations between childhood poverty and the child's adult outcomes in education, health and socialization, fertility, labor market, and income. Strong evidence suggests that children of low income parents have an increased risk of intellectual and behavioral development problems. Large negative associations between poverty during early childhood and academic outcomes have been consistently found in many studies. Furthermore, children in poverty have a greater risk of displaying behavior and emotional problems, such as impulsiveness and difficulty getting along with peers, and family poverty is associated with higher risk for teen childbearing, less positive peer relations, and lower self-esteem. These behaviors increase the chances of children who grew up in poverty to stay in poverty.

In terms of economic disadvantages, adults who experienced persistent childhood poverty are more likely to fall below the poverty line at least once later in life. Poor boys work fewer hours per year, earn lower hourly wages, receive lower annual earnings, and spend more week idle in their mid-twenties. Paternal income is also strongly associated with adult economic status. The National Academy of Sciences found that "childhood poverty and chronic stress may lead to problems regulating emotions as an adult". Not only can growing up in poverty affect physical health, it can have an effect on your future as well. Growing up in poverty has been statistically proven to increase an individual's probability of going to prison, becoming an addict, mental illness, or not completing high school. Because of these things, children who grow up in poverty often end up staying in poverty and repeating the cycle.

Also, childhood poverty in the first three years of life is related to substandard nutritional status and poor motor skills; in contrast, poverty is also associated with child obesity – as they get older, poor children are more likely to have chronic health problems, such as asthma and anemia. These impacts probably reflect issues related to poverty including a substandard diet, inferior housing conditions, poor neighborhood environment, reduced access to goods and activities and the psychological stress stemming from these factors.

The relationship between childhood poverty and later negative adult outcomes has been found to be relatively small in other research. In one systematic analysis, family income only "modestly" affected likelihood of teen pregnancy and male unemployment.

=== Developing countries ===
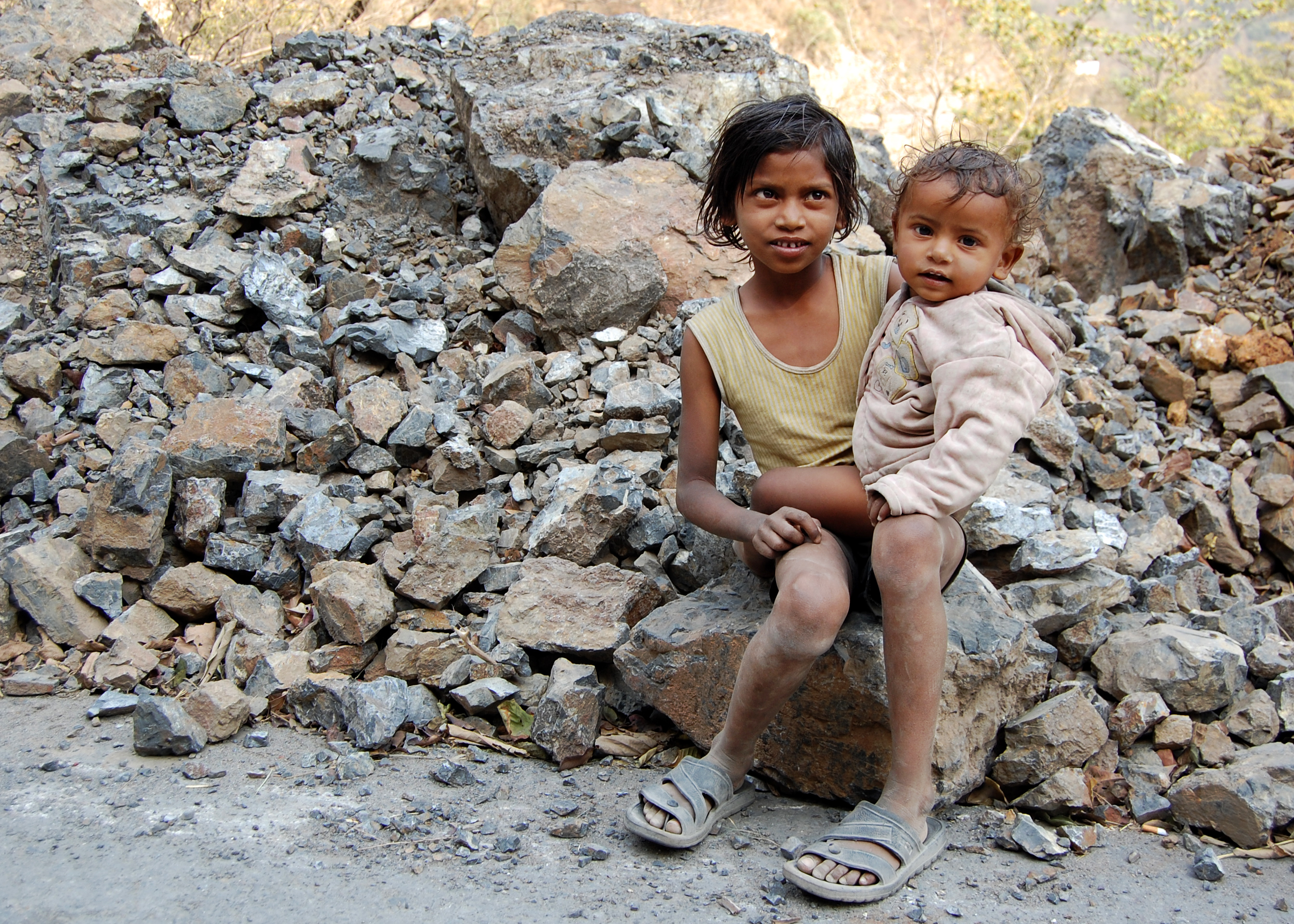
Children of road workers near Rishikesh, India.

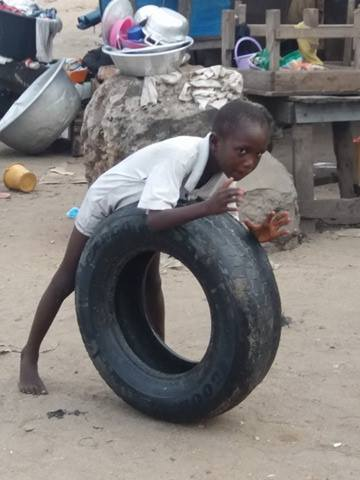
James Town, Accra.

Using a relative measure of child poverty, an impoverished child growing up in a developing country suffers more hardship than most children living in poverty in a developed country. Poverty in these countries is a condition usually characterised by a severe deprivation of basic human needs (UN,1995). It is estimated that one third of all children in developing countries (~674 million) are living in poverty, the highest rates being in the rural areas of Sub-Saharan Africa and South Asia (over 70%). War, disease, corruption, lack of resources and harsh environmental conditions afflict many of these countries, contributing to their poverty. These factors are a major cause of death, which in turn leads to a higher number of single parents and orphaned children. All UN member states have ratified the 1989 Convention on the Rights of the Child, with the exception of the United States and South Sudan, which aims at reducing violations to a number of rights relevant to reducing child poverty in different countries. A review published by UNICEF in 2009, found declines in under five mortality, less child malnourishment, increases in breastfeeding, improved water systems and better education access. It also states that despite these improvements 24 000 children still die each day from mostly preventable diseases, 150 million 5- to 14-year-olds are involved in child labour and 100 million primary aged children go without schooling. There are still great inequalities within populations, with girls and children from rural areas more likely to suffer poor health, education and survival than boys and urban populations. Notable state attempts to tackle child poverty in the developing world, include Brazil's Bolsa Familia initiative (reaches 12 million households) and South Africa's Child Grant (7 million households. Elsewhere, child specific social protection policies and programmes are few and the institutions to implement them are often lacking.

== Policy implications ==
According to the Overseas Development Institute, greater visibility for children's rights issues is needed in donor policies and attempts should be made to emulate the success achieved using gender markers to develop gender-sensitive development policy. They believe major influential players in the children's rights community – the UNICEF, UNFPA and NGOs, such as Save the Children, Plan International and World Vision – should do more to highlight the impact of mainstream macro-policies issues on children. The Overseas Development Institute further suggests that an international commission be established to address the impact of the 3-F crisis (food, financial and fuel) on children as a platform for dialogue and new initiatives.

However, determining the appropriate policies for dealing with long-term childhood poverty and intergenerational economic inequality is hotly debated, as are most proposed policy solutions, and depends on the effects that most impact the region. In order to combat the lack of resources available in developed nations, policies must be developed that deliver resources to poor families and raise skill levels of poor children by building on successful welfare-to-work initiatives and maintaining financial work supports, such as Earned Income Tax Credit, refundable child care tax credits and housing vouchers. The UN Convention on the Rights of the Child concludes that for a family in poverty, if the parents are unable to fulfill their duties as financial caregivers for their children, the state is expected to fill in to maintain the health and wellbeing of the children. This declaration argues that the responsibility to address child poverty should not solely be placed on the parents and caregivers of the children but taken up by the states of which the children are inhabiting. While many welfare states are working to improve their welfare programs, issues of citizenship and citizenship policies often negate the state's ability to combat poverty efficiently, thus sustaining the child and their family's impoverished status in society. Combating poverty in developed countries also means improving the schools that exist there. In order to help children in poverty, schools need to invest more money in school meals, libraries, and healthcare. To effectively address economic, demographic and cultural changes, economic and social service strategies to reverse the factors that generated the urban underclass, such as providing jobs and social services policies that deal with the effects of isolation, should be implemented. Finally, in order to reduce the cycle of poverty for children and families, policies should be aimed at expanding economic opportunities especially for disadvantaged girls.

== Conclusion ==
UNICEF advocates for greater national investments in social protection and supports government efforts to track and monitor progress on poverty reduction.

The roots of the problem lie in a mix of:

- a failure to prioritize the social protection programmes that have the greatest benefits for children
- limited budgets and human resources
- barriers such as bureaucratic processes and lack of information about entitlements and programmes, and
- discrimination against the most vulnerable people, including those who receive social protection.

The result: the most vulnerable children in the region are not being reached by benefits to which they are entitled.

Aiming for an end to poverty – in line with Sustainable Development Goal 1 – UNICEF is working with governments and other partners across the region to halve child poverty by 2030 and strengthen social protection systems to diminish the impact of poverty on their lives.

== See also ==
- Children's rights
- Cycle of poverty
- Diseases of poverty
- Economic inequality
- Feminization of poverty
- Fuel poverty
- Hunger
- Income disparity
- International inequality
- Juvenilization of poverty
- Minimum wage
- Orphanage
- Poverty reduction
- Poverty threshold
- Social exclusion
- Street children
- Subsidized housing
- Working poor
- Make Poverty History
- The Hunger Site
- Think of the children
- Moonlight clan
