= PhotoSensitive (organization) =

- Type: Nonprofit organization
- Founded: 1990
- Founder: Andrew Stawicki; Peter Robertson
- Headquarters: Toronto, Ontario, Canada
- Area served: Canada
- Key people: Andrew Stawicki, Founding Photographer
- Website: http://www.photosensitive.com

PhotoSensitive is a Canadian nonprofit collective with the goal of spreading social awareness through black-and-white photography. Based in Mississauga, Ontario, Canada, it was founded by Toronto Star photographer Andrew Stawicki and Toronto Star photo editor Peter Robertson. PhotoSensitive has raised funds for various charities, including donations to Daily Bread Food Bank and The Hospital for Sick Children. More than 100 Canadian professional and amateur photographers have participated in PhotoSensitive projects. In 2010, PhotoSensitive celebrated their 20-year anniversary. In 2018, founder Stawicki was awarded the Meritorious Service Cross (civil division) by the Governor General of Canada for his work on this project.

== Exhibits ==
=== Overview ===
Name	Premiere
It's In Their Eyes	1990–1992
Precious Time	1994
Hand of Hope	1995
Them = Us	1997
Braille = Equality	2000
Child Poverty: A National Disgrace	1999–2000
HIV Positive	2002
Destination Toronto	2004
Life of Water	2004–2005
Beyond the Wave	2005
Summer of Hope	2005
AIDS: Picture Change	2005–2006
The Strength Within	2007
Vibrant Communities in Focus	2007
Living With	2007–2008
Inspiring Possibilities	2009
Cancer Connections	2008–2010
TIEd Together	2011
The Fuel of Life	2011
Kids Who Can	2012
Picture Change	2013

=== It's In Their Eyes ===
PhotoSensitive's first project, It's In Their Eyes, started in 1990 focused on Toronto's hungry, homeless and under-housed population. Twelve photographers in partnership with Daily Bread Food Bank created a photo essay that documented the people Daily Bread served. The exhibit launched on April 5, 1992.

=== Precious Time ===
The next project, Precious Time, was a partnership between PhotoSensitive and The Hospital for Sick Children. SickKids Hospital gave PhotoSensitive's twelve members 24-hour access to the hospital for eight months. The 120 photo exhibit was launched in 1994 with the goal to raise money for SickKids' Herbie Fund.

=== Them = Us ===
Launched in 1997, Them = Us was organized by the Harmony Movement, and curated by Vancouver-based artist Tom Graff. PhotoSensitive invited twelve new photographers to the collective. Them = Us was PhotoSensitive's first nationwide project. The National Movement for Harmony in Canada published a Them = Us photo book titled Harmony in 1998.

In 2008, Them = Us was exhibited at the Canadian Association of Statutory Human Rights Agencies annual conference.

=== Braille = Equality ===
Braille = Equality was created in 2000 in a partnership between PhotoSensitive and the CNIB (the Canadian National Institute for the Blind). It was launched on February 9, 2000, on Parliament Hill. Since its launch, Braille = Equality has been shown across Canada, in the United States and in Melbourne, Australia.

=== Child Poverty: A National Disgrace ===
Starting in 2000, Child Poverty: A National Disgrace was a partnership between PhotoSensitive and Campaign 2000 in response to rising child poverty in Canada. The exhibit of 70 images by 24 photographers launched on November 26, 2001.

=== Destination Toronto ===
In response to Toronto's outbreak of SARS, PhotoSensitive documented the vibrance of the city as Destination Toronto. David Miller and James Bartleman launched in the Brookfield Place in February, 2004.

=== Life of Water ===
Life of Water was the first exhibit to be launched with a book. PhotoSensitive sought to document the entirety of water's impact on Canadians. PhotoSensitive invited photographers from across Canada to start shooting for Life of Water in 2004. The Brookfield Place was launched by David Ramsay, former Canadian Minister of Natural Resources, and saw 160 black-and-white photographs on September 7, 2005. The Life of Water book contains an essay by David Suzuki.

=== Summer of Hope ===
During the summer of 2005, James Bartleman, former Lieutenant Governor of Ontario, launched reading camps in five First Nations communities—North Caribou Lake, Kingfisher Lake, Muskrat Dam, Neskantaga and Fort Albany.—to fight high youth suicide rates. James Bartleman secured a grant from the Ontario Trillium Foundation for PhotoSensitive to document the Summer of Hope

=== Vibrant Communities in Focus ===
Created in 2007, Vibrant Communities in Focus celebrated the 25th anniversary of the Ontario Trillium Foundation. Twenty-seven photographers visited twenty-seven of the Trillium Foundation's most successful agencies and non-profit organizations from across Ontario. Vibrant Communities in Focus exhibition was opened in Toronto and then traveled across Ontario.

=== Living With ===
On Tuesday 4, December 2007 seven PhotoSensitive photographers left to spend ten days in Rwanda to shed light on the state of HIV/AIDS in the country. Living With is the collective's third international project and was in partnership with Carleton University and the National University of Rwanda. The 50 photo exhibit launched in Brookfield Place on July 22, 2008.

=== Cancer Connections ===
Started in early 2008, Cancer Connections was shot by PhotoSensitive in partnership with the Canadian Cancer Society and dedicated to June Callwood. The project called for submissions from not only photographers, but ordinary Canadians that had a story to tell. Cancer Connections contained 1,000 photos from all walks a life across Canada. Cancer Connections launched on May 20, 2008, in Nathan Phillips Square, Toronto, Ontario. The final national show was held on June 10, 2010, in Major's Hill Park, Ottawa, Ontario.

=== TIEd Together ===
PhotoSensitive partnered with Prostate Cancer Canada to create TIEd Together to raise awareness for prostate cancer. The exhibit featured photographs of men who were fighting or who had survived prostate cancer, including Jack Layton.

=== Kids Who Can ===
Over the summer of 2011, PhotoSensitive partnered with Easter Seals (Canada) to capture the experiences of children with disabilities. For Kids Who Can, PhotoSensitive had twenty-five photographers on assignment to twelve Easter Seals camps. The tour was launched on June 18, 2012, at the Mic Mac Mall, Halifax, Canada.

=== Picture Change ===
Launched on July 16, 2013, at the Royal Bank Plaza, Picture Change began in 2012, and is the collection of images chosen by the photographers that involved social change. PhotoSensitive sent an invitation to over 100 top Canadian photographers to create the exhibit, including Doug Ball, Peter Martin and Paul Watson. A Picture Change book was published accompanying the opening. It is currently touring Toronto, Canada.

== Publications ==
- Precious Time (1995, PhotoSensitive; ISBN 1-896465-00-5)
- Harmony (1998, Macmillan Canada; ISBN 0-7715-7632-3)
- PhotoSensitive Ten Years: A work in progress (2000, PhotoSensitive; ISBN 09687061-0-X)
- Life of Water (2005, PhotoSensitive; ISBN 0-9687061-1-8)
- Vibrant Communities in Focus (2007, PhotoSensitive; ISBN 978-0-9687061-2-1)
- Inspiring Possibilities (2009, PhotoSensitive; ISBN 978-09687061-3-8)
- Field of Vision (2010, PhotoSensitive; ISBN 978-0-9687061-4-5)
- Cancer Connections (2011, John Wiley & Sons Canada; ISBN 978-0-470-96449-1)
- Picture Change (2013, PhotoSensitive)
