= Rural poverty in Canada =

Rural poverty in Canada is part of rural poverty worldwide, albeit Canada is among the richer countries in the world. In 2020, 5.6% of Canada's rural population lived in poverty. Groups most vulnerable to rural poverty include: children, women (including lone parent families), immigrants, seniors, and Indigenous persons.

== Official Poverty Line ==
In 2018, Canada adopted an official measure of poverty, formerly known as the Market Basket Measure.

== Access to care ==
=== Nursing Government ===
Nurses have been self governing within the province of Ontario since 1963. The College of Nurses (CNO) assure that all nurses within the province are registered through the CNO and that all nurses meet the requirements established by them. Requirements are based on knowledge and expertise of practice and that all nurses work within their scope of practice. Self governing occurs when the body of professionals are governed by members of its own profession. Nurses in Ontario have the responsibility to work according to professional standards and Code of Ethics. Nurses can contribute to the making of regulations and standards by providing knowledge from evidence based practice, as well as theoretical knowledge to help ensure best practice when providing quality care. Regulatory bodies are responsible for ensuring that all who practice nursing are competent and continue to build on their skills through continuity of education and skill development. “Regulatory bodies develop and maintain standards of nursing practice that specify the level of performance expected of registered nurses to provide safe, competent and ethical care". Nursing Practice standards are put in place to provide the public the same quality of care despite location. The CNO is responsible for providing quality care to the public including making healthcare accessible.

=== Barriers to accessing health care ===
For those living in rural Canada, they may face various challenges when trying to access health care. Difficulties which rural areas experience when accessing health care include long distances between health services, lack of transportation, increase amount of elderly, fewer health care providers, and limited awareness of resources available. Under the Canada Health Act, provincial health insurance plans must satisfy principles including: universality, accessibility, comprehensiveness, portability, and public administration. For those living in rural communities, these principles are not always met. With 90% of Canada identified as geographically rural, and approximately a quarter of the population are dwelling within rural areas with fewer than 10,000 people, this is a concern when identify health barriers.

Health care is considered accessible when within a 30-60 minute drive in rural settings, and emergency vehicles are considered accessible when there is less than a thirty-minute drive. This is a concern in emergency situations as an individual has a long wait time before being provided medical attention. Transportation is a significant factor that is a barrier to accessing health care. In rural areas an individual may have to travel great distances to seek medical attention, road quality may be very poor, weather conditions effecting driving, and rural areas seldom have access to public transportation. The elderly have the greatest need for transportation services, a challenge to this is services is they may have to be booked a week in advance. Also, with the baby boom generation, there will be an increasing number of elderly needing access to health care. A large percentage of people over 65 have a number of comorbidities, and need regular visits to a family doctor, the cost of regular transportation to a healthcare provider can be substantial. For many living in rural poverty, financial difficulties impede a person from being able to own a vehicle. The need for transportation to health care will only decrease when there is greater availability to health care programs, this involves bringing more health care providers to rural areas.

In Ontario, rural residents were found more likely to report difficulties related to specialist service access. Primarily wait times were cited as reasons for these difficulties, followed by a perceived lack of availability. Other health risks associated with low income and low education are an increase in high risk behaviors leading to poor health including smoking, obesity, and substance abuse specifically alcohol. People of higher income have means to pay for resources which could improve health, such as weight loss programs, gym memberships, smoking cessation programs, rehabilitation facilities where as people of lesser income are unable to pay for privately owned health enhancing programs. The low income families continue with the high risk behaviour despite limited finances this includes smoking and the price of cigarettes. People of lower socioeconomic status are less likely to look long term at their health compared to higher income families who would be more likely to contribute to program to benefit their health. Those of higher socioeconomic status are more likely to think of long term health and take preventative measures to promote good health.

=== Resource accessibility ===
Rural areas struggle with being able to provide resources to people within their community to help reduce the challenges of social poverty. Many living within poverty need assistance from food shelters, homeless shelters, drug and alcohol abuse programs, counseling programs, and women’s shelters. Many of these programs in rural communities are organized by volunteers which may have little or no training, and the buildings which the programs are run from may be lacking in suitable infrastructure. There may be limited funding available to these programs which effects staffing and resources which can be provided to those seeking assistance. Individuals at risk for living in poverty are those with mental health issues, disabilities, single mothers, individuals suffering from addiction, and immigrants unable to speak English. This is challenging as resources established to support disadvantaged groups are closing as a result of little funding and inability to effectively support these groups. The individuals seeking the assistance are left to cope on their own. Community donations and volunteers play a large role in community support remaining open to the public in rural setting.

=== Physician accessibility ===
During the 1990s, Canadians were increasingly losing confidence in health care access as poor people were waiting longer periods of time to see physicians. There are increasing number of health practices being privatized which decreases the accessibility for those living in rural poverty. There a few physicians available to support this population. In 2024, while 18% of Canadians lived in rural communities, only 7% of Canadian physicians were located in rural areas. The number of accessible health specialists is lacking in Canadian rural areas. An average of 4 million Canadians go without a family physician. There is also a high physician turnover rate in rural areas due to increased workload, geographic and social isolation. This can be challenging as many individuals who seek specialized care need to have a referral from a family physician. When there is a high physician turnover rate then individuals are having to develop a trusting relationship and provide previous medical history to a new family physician. This beings challenges as some relationships take years to develop trust with a family physician, and a bad experience with one can bring challenges when having to transfer to a new physician.

“Rural communities are understood as places with small populations, limited material and financial resources, and a heightened vulnerability to health service and health human resources shortages as a consequence of their distance from urban centres”. With rural areas having a high population of elderly an increasing number of individuals living with one or more chronic illness, the need for rural area physicians and specialists are rising. Chronically ill patients account for over half of family physicians visits. In Canada, individuals who need to see a specialist wait an average of four weeks to three months. This increases health risk for those living in rural poverty, as there is a greater difficulty accessing health care. There is an increase in number of those living with chronic illness, greater elder population, and fewer health care professionals available in rural communities. For those living in rural poverty, the Canada Health Act ensures that health care is provided at no financial expense including hospital care, surgical procedures, dental surgeries, primary care doctors, and specialists are covered through provincial health insurance plans. This enables individuals to receive care despite being unable to pay for care.

== Vulnerable populations ==
Poverty among rural Canadians is a continuing issue within Canada. Although rural living can be challenging for any population, there are several groups in which are considered more vulnerable to poverty. Several contributing factors such as employment, education, geographical location, cost of living and low income are definite issues among these specific groups. With that being said, many of these populations are finding themselves struggling to keep above the poverty line.

=== Single-parent families ===
Lone families or single parent families are incredibly susceptible to poverty in Canada, especially those who reside in rural areas. Although single male parent families are at risk, families with a woman as the only parent are at a much greater risk. Women who are raising their families on their own are at a huge risk for poverty among Canada. Women in rural Canada are at disadvantage for employment opportunities due to the lack of jobs within the community. Formal education is also a challenge for rural women because of the general low income status and high cost of education. Without formal education, rural women often cannot find good paying jobs that provide stability and benefits to support their families. In order to find affordable housing for a single parent income, one must often look outside of town to more remote areas. Although housing is cheaper, the employment opportunities decrease; causing women to look for employment closer to town or within the community. By having to travel to work, vehicle costs or alternative transportation costs are increased. Wages in rural Canada are lower than those in urban areas, which contributes to the overall lower income and poor income status among these families. For women supporting a family, the poor wages, low employment rate, high cost of living and lack of financial support are the risk factors in which increase the incidence of poverty among this population. This creates a huge expense for travel and transportation, as well as child care. If the children in the family attend school, transportation to school is often limited to those residing in remote areas. Providing or paying for alternative transportation for children to attend school is also an additional cost.

=== The elderly ===
Elderly people living in rural areas are at an increased risk for poverty in rural areas in Canada. Elderly individuals, especially one family women, in rural Canada are at a great risk for poverty and low economical status. With a more direct focus on elderly poverty, rural women over the age of 65, are found to have a much lower annual income than adults living in non-rural communities. Over 19% of women over the age of 65 were living in poverty in Canada, as opposed to 10% of elderly males. There are several factors that put the rural elderly, especially women, at risk of poverty. Annual income for the elderly in rural areas is much lower than those in urban areas. Rural women over the age of 65 had the least amount of public sector funding and government support out of all of the Canadian populations. Only 41% of their annual income was through financial support, meaning that they are required to rely on their pension or personal savings to support themselves. For many, this is not enough to meet their daily living needs, let alone health care expenses and additional cost of living expenses. Due to the decreased population density in rural areas in Canada, there is a mass shortage of public services that are offered to individuals. Although all populations are affected, the elderly experience a major negative impact. For example, transportation becomes a major issue. More than 25% of the elderly living in rural areas did not own or have access to a car. This means that other means of transportation is required; however there are very limited public transportation services available, especially for individuals living in extreme remote areas. Finding methods of transportation can become expensive and often discouraging for elders. The elderly in rural Canada often live in older, single family homes that often have larger property sizes. Maintaining a home is costly. Maintenance such as cutting the grass or shoveling snow can be too much for the elderly to complete, therefore help is needed in order to keep up. In rural areas, public services are often hard to find and can be expensive. Maintaining their homes can create an added cost to individuals, whereas in previous year they would have been able to perform these tasks themselves. With the lack of services, the elderly often find they are unable to maintain their homes or perform maintenance duties.

=== Children and young adults ===
Children living in rural Canada are negatively affected by poverty and low income situations; especially children from single parent families. Single parent families in rural communities are more likely to have a low income and poor economical status. Child poverty is an issue in rural Canada due to the decreased job opportunities and stability for families in low income situations. In addition, financial support is often not enough to ensure the children are provided with the basic essential of daily living. Children who grow up in poverty are less likely to improve their economical status as they grow older. Children of poverty are less likely to achieve a high school diploma or a post secondary education, due to the financial strain of the family and inability to afford to get to school or to move away. This same idea ties into the issues of young adults and rural areas. Young adults in rural Canada are extremely susceptible to poverty for many additional reasons. Jobs are incredibly hard to find for young adults because of their lack of experience. Employers will often require experience in order to be a successful candidate. With the huge shortage of jobs already existing, young rural Canadians find it challenging to start their careers. In addition, formal education or post secondary is often set aside because of the lack of funding and affordability to leave their community. There are very few post secondary institutions located in remote and rural Canada, meaning that most people would have to travel or relocate in order to attend. This is often impossible for those living in these communities. Furthermore, financial assistance or employment insurance is not always an option because in order to be eligible, one must obtain a specific amount of working hours. If a young adult is unable to find work, this type of assistance would be denied due to the lack of worked hours and employment.

=== Indigenous people ===
Canadian aboriginal people living in rural areas are considered among the poorest populations. There are several factors in which contributes to poverty among aboriginals in Canada. Despite many beliefs, poverty risk factors continue to exist for aboriginals living on and off the reserves Although the Canadian aboriginal population living off of the reserves are at risk of poverty, individuals living on the reserves demonstrate a much greater risk. Lack of employment, poor paying jobs, alcohol abuse, poor access to health care and low education levels are all areas in which contribute to the increased risk of poverty.

The overall earnings of aboriginal Canadians living in rural areas in significantly lower than non-aboriginals living in more urban areas. Many Canadian aboriginals reside on reserves where their families grow and their communities develop. There is a massive job shortage among these reserves. With that being said, many attempt to seek employment outside of the reserves within the rural community. However, due to the remote and isolated geographical location of many aboriginal communities, jobs are scarce even off of the reserves. Within the Algonquin native reserves, approximately 90% of the residents are unemployed. For aboriginal’s who are employed and living in rural areas, they are paid much less than those living in more urban areas. Wages in rural Canada are typically much lower than those in urban areas, simply because the economical status of rural communities are often lower and small businesses cannot afford to pay large wages to their employees. Also, many of the rural jobs are seasonal or temporary for these individuals, meaning that they may be out of work for many months of the year. In addition, the cost of living is a major contributor to aboriginal poverty in rural Canada. The cost of food and daily living supplies are more expensive in rural areas than in urban cities. This is because the cost to transport these supplies to rural distributors is much more. Although some rural housing and land may come at a lower cost than urban areas, the maintenance and up-keep of the housing is a costly factor that contributes to poverty among aboriginals.

While the education rate among Aboriginals living in rural Canada is much lower than urban areas, there is vicious cycle that occurs when examining the correlations. Among aboriginal Canadians, on and off the reserve, 32% have not achieved their high school diploma, as opposed to 15% of non-aboriginal Canadians. On the other hand, approximately 8% of aboriginal men in Canada have a university degree, as opposed to 25% of non-aboriginal men. There are several reasons in which contribute to the gap in educational levels. For rural aboriginals in Canada, poverty can affect the availability as well as eliminate educational options. Some individuals find that they have to leave high school in attempt to find a job to help support their struggling families. Post secondary school is incredibly expensive, and for people living in poverty, college or university is not a realistic goal. Therefore, the vicious cycle takes place. People cannot find jobs because they do not have the educational background, but in yet their families cannot afford the cost of education.

In terms of gender and aboriginal poverty in Canada, there does tend to be a gap between aboriginal men and women when it comes to income and economical status. Among aboriginal individuals living in rural Canada, women are less likely to have employment and often have a much lower annual income. In many cases, aboriginal women are the primary caregivers for their children and the elderly in their families. Women who are able to seek employment often have difficulty due to the job shortages, as well as requirements for education and experience. This can cause a serious financial strain on the families, especially for single parent families trying to manage all of their expenses.

=== Individuals with disabilities ===
Individuals with disabilities living in rural Canada are at high risk of living in poverty. Disability is defined as a long term difficulty with daily living activities such as mobility, learning, hearing or communicating. People living with a disability may find it challenging to work, depending on their condition. Among the rural jobs, many of which involve physical labor and less than ideal working conditions. Some individuals with disabilities would be unable to work in these conditions. This contributes to the risk of poverty among rural residents, because the inability to work has a significant impact on their income. Disability support services are available; however the cost of living is incredibly high. Especially for those living in rural areas, home care and home services are limited which creates a challenge for some. In addition, rural living has an increased risk of injury due to the remote locations and few health services. This also because a challenge for individuals with a disability.

== Health outcomes ==
People in rural areas experiencing poverty are having poorer health outcomes than their urban counterparts as evidenced by a lower self-reported general health and a higher inability to engage in major activities because of their health.

=== Admissions ===
Canadians living in rural poverty are facing poorer hospital outcomes. When looking at Canadians diagnosed with congestive heart failure being admitted to hospital, lower admission rates were found in metropolitan areas than non metropolitan areas. A visit to a metropolitan hospital costs more as they are more services such as angiography available to metropolitan citizens. In Manitoba, Hospital admissions are also greater at the end of life for rural Canadians living in poverty relative to their urban counterparts due to lack of end of life outpatient services.

=== Recovery ===
The recovery process of Canadians after surgery and risk of infection can be increased by a short length of hospital stay, alcoholism, diabetes, obesity, and living in a rural residency. Rural poverty potentiates the risk of post-op infection as well. Alcoholism, diabetes and obesity are often health outcomes related to rural poverty which makes recovering from any illness of surgery more difficult for Canadians living in rural poverty.

=== Social supplementary ===
Rural Canadians who live in poverty have a difficult time accessing mental health care and social supports. This includes the availability of mental health resources and number of mental health professionals that are accessible to these citizens. The lack of access and available supports directly affect the mental health of rural Canadians living in poverty.

=== Social determinants of health and health outcomes ===
The poor health outcomes mentioned seem to be a product of the impact of social determinants of health in a rural setting for a person living in poverty. Social determinants of health are strong contributors of respective health outcomes education. Causes of poverty in rural areas includes low income, lack of employment, the high costs of new housing construction, poor quality of housing (leading to higher costs for heating), poor health and lack of healthcare within a reasonable traveling distance, and low levels of education. All of which are related to social determinants of health and impact health outcomes for those living in poverty. Specific social determinants of health that contribute to rural poverty and poor health outcomes include: income, employment and working conditions, economy, population demographics, housing, health, education, child and youth development, gender, and culture. Social determinants of health are extremely relevant to the cause and effect of rural poverty and health. For example, those living in lower-income households tend to live in older, poor quality housing units which are often inadequately insulated and have high heat and utility costs. This poor heating can affect health, and the high utility costs are often unrealistic for Canadians living in rural poverty. Also, the cause and effect element of rural poverty is certainly evident when looking at food as a critical component to health and a product of income. Many Canadians living in poverty find themselves without adequate food, or are unable to afford the appropriate groceries to support their family and their own nutritional and developmental needs. It can be even more difficult for rural Canadians living in poverty as they have less access to social supports because of the greater distances between rural and urban centres, and cannot spend the money on gas and transportation to seek food security within urban areas where supports are often located.

=== Health disparities ===
Poverty in Canada has extensive influence on the quality of many aspects of life for rural citizens. With social determinants of health in mind, poverty in rural areas can cause out-migration and population decline, poorer education outcomes, poorer employment opportunities due to transportation costs and child care costs, poorer living and eating conditions. All of which directly affect health. The lack of education, employment and then income levels affect a rural Canadian’s ability to travel for work, or afford groceries. When the necessary social determinants of health are not being met, it has a direct effect on health outcomes for rural Canadians, and creates a strain or the few social supports available within rural communities. Poverty also influences the personal life choices of those living in rural areas as they develop coping methods to face daily challenges which affect health as which creates the recognition that personal life “choices” are greatly influenced by the financial circumstance that people live with.

=== Recognizing the gap ===
There is clearly a difference between rural and urban poverty in Canada and their respective health outcomes. When comparing rural and urban residents, rural Canadians tend to have lower education levels, lower levels of literacy, lower incomes, fewer job opportunities, fewer higher paying job opportunities, more seasonal employment, more housing that is in need of repairs, poorer health, and poorer access to health care services than urban Canadians. In regards to health outcomes, and health care services related to stroke specifically, an association has been linked between low income, low hospital volume, and poorer stroke outcome. This suggests that Canadians of different socio-economic groups may have equal access to health care facilities, but the quality of said facilities is often reflection of financial status of the residents of the area. The high-volume, urban hospitals are often not easily accessible to Canadians who live in rural poverty, magnifying the gap between rural and urban stroke outcomes, and overall health status.

=== Closing the gap ===
In a response to the poor health outcomes and health disparities specific to rural poverty in Canada, there have been many coalitions and initiatives that nurses, physicians and researchers are attempting to implement in order to close the gap between rural and urban health outcomes. Changes in research are being called for as there is an evident lack of research that focuses on rural poverty, but plenty of studies done for urban poverty in Canada. Nurses and organizations are recognizing areas for further research in areas such as rural immigrants, foreign migrant workers, rural family violence, labour force mobility of low income households, barriers specific to rural health settings, rural aboriginal homeless, rural adolescents, and more longitudinal studies measuring long-term outcomes related to health care gaps. More information on rural poverty in Canada would aid in the evolution of much needed interventions towards ending the long-term poverty found in rural Canada. Many studies have illustrated the need for rural networks and supports to address a broad spectrum of personal and social needs. Unfortunately many of these “solutions” only provide short term fixes and are not able to work long term to assist rural Canadians in their journey out of poverty.

One successful group “The Nurse-Physician Collaborative Partnership” was developed to provide improved access and quality of services to chronically ill elderly living in rural areas by sharing the care between the two professions. The partnership found that interdisciplinary homecare was beneficial, reduced cost and improved health outcomes. This approach also reported high levels of patient satisfaction. Patients favoured the in-home interventions implemented by the nurse and physician collaboration as it decreased cost expenses of traveling and made receiving care possible if a lack of transportation was available. The collaborative partnership reduced patient anxiety about their health concerns and increased their confidence in managing their own health issues. The program addressed several common health outcomes of rural Canadians living in poverty as it reduced the number of hospital admissions, length of hospital stay, the number of emergency room and ambulatory care visits, and the number of tests needed.
