= Citizens for Public Justice =

Ecumenical social justice organisation

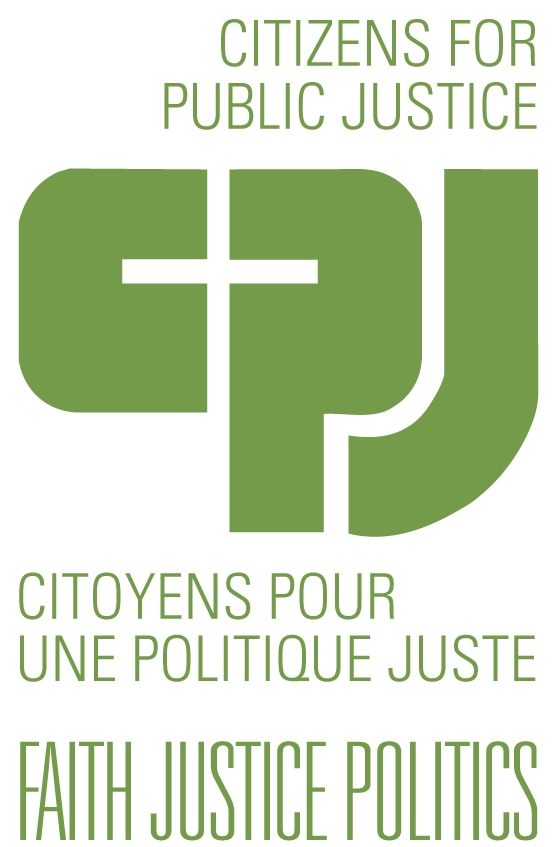
- Abbreviation: CPJ
- Formation: 1963
- Type: Non-profit organization
- Location: Ottawa, Ontario, Canada
- Fields: Canadian Social & Environmental Public Policy
- Director: Willard Metzger
- Website: cpj.ca
- Formerly called: Committee for Justice and Liberty

Citizens for Public Justice (CPJ) is an ecumenical, non-profit organization that promotes justice in Canadian public policy through research and analysis focused on poverty reduction, ecological justice, and refugee rights.

CPJ defines public justice as the political dimension of loving one's neighbour, caring for creation, and achieving the common good. CPJ's mission statement is "to promote public justice in Canada by shaping key public policy debates through research and analysis, publishing, and public dialogue. CPJ encourages citizens, leaders in society, and governments to support policies and practices which reflect God's call for love, justice, and the flourishing of Creation."

CPJ is a registered charity in Canada whose work is funded through donations from private individuals and members, as well as from churches and foundational grants. Its board of directors is made up of 13 representatives from all regions of Canada. Directors can sit a maximum of two three-year terms. In 2013, CPJ celebrated its 50th anniversary. CPJ is an affiliate member of the Canadian Council of Churches (CCC).

== History ==
=== 1960s: Founding ===
CPJ was founded in Toronto in 1963 as the Committee for Justice and Liberty (CJL Foundation) by Gerald Vandezande. In 1971, it merged with the Alberta-based Christian Action Foundation, led by John Olthuis who joined Vandezande in Toronto.

=== 1970s: Mackenzie Valley Pipeline ===
In the 1970s, the CJL Foundation campaigned against the proposed Mackenzie Valley Pipeline, which would have been built through the traditional land of the Dene people in the Mackenzie Valley of the Northwest Territories in order to send fossil fuels from the Beaufort Sea to American consumers. Appearing before the Berger Inquiry, the CJL Foundation called for a 10-year moratorium on the projects. This was reiterated by John Olthuis, Hugh McCullum, and Karmel McCullum in their book Moratorium and later become a major recommendation of the Mackenzie Valley Pipeline Inquiry by Justice Thomas R. Berger. Tommy Douglas, leader of the NDP, asked to buy hundreds of copies of the book to distribute on Parliament Hill. Eventually, Pierre Elliott Trudeau's government declared a moratorium. This achievement is generally considered to be one of CPJ's biggest impacts, and an early victory for the group.

=== 1980s: Grassy Narrows First Nation ===
In 1982, the CJL Foundation's focus shifted to federal public policy. It officially changed its name to Citizens for Public Justice (CPJ) and drafted Guidelines for Christian Political Service and The Charter of Social Rights and Responsibilities.

Throughout the early 1980s, CPJ opened regional offices in Calgary, Edmonton, and Vancouver, while its national office stayed in Toronto. Kathy Vandergrift, a staffer in the Edmonton office, was named Edmonton's Citizen of the Year for proposing what turned into the Blue Box Recycling Program. CPJ was very involved in the push to get that program implemented, conducting workshops in schools & churches, distributing brochures, and forming the Edmonton Recycling Society, who would run the first recycling centre.

In 1980, Olthuis began representing the Grassy Narrows First Nation whose homeland had been contaminated with mercury. In 1985, a compensation settlement was reached.

During this time, CPJ proposed a national Social Development and Job Creation fund. Then, in 1986, CPJ introduced the idea of a government tithe, whereby the government would use 10% of its budget to help the poor. The Toronto Star gave the idea front-page coverage, and it was covered by other secular and Christian media as it had received support from Christian leaders.

In 1988, Harry Kits became CPJ's Executive Director.

=== 1990s: Child poverty and refugee rights ===
In 1991, CPJ closed its regional offices and moved all of its operations back to Toronto. In doing this they also changed their work to focus on a few key issues in order to get more in depth with each one. This led to more attention being put on research and education around refugee rights and poverty in Canada.

In the 1990s, CPJ focused on aboriginal rights, poverty, and refugee rights. It was vocal in its support of the Royal Commission on Aboriginal Peoples. Later in the early 2000s, CPJ opposed the widely criticized British Columbia aboriginal treaty referendum around First Nations treaty rights.

In 1998, CPJ and Campaign 2000 launched "Let's Invest in Canada's Children", a campaign to end child poverty in Canada. CPJ, The Canadian Islamic Congress, and the Canadian Council for Reform Judaism appeared jointly in front of the House of Commons Finance Committee to emphasize the inter-faith support for anti-poverty measures.

From 1995 to 2000, CPJ spoke out against the so-called "head tax", the Right of Landing fee of $975 charged to Convention refugees upon arrival. This fee was removed in the 2000 federal budget. They had also been working on the student loans for refugees issue, and saw a victory on that in the early 2000s.

=== 2000s: Move to Ottawa ===
The new millennium marked many changes for CPJ. On August 22, 2001, Vandezande received the Order of Canada. CPJ was recognized with a certificate of appreciation from the Somali Canadian Advocacy Network for their refugee work, which continued throughout the decade. CPJ also began its anti-poverty work, educating the public and conducting research. This all led up to the launch of the Dignity for All campaign in 2009.

CPJ moved its headquarters from Toronto to Ottawa in 2007. One of the main reasons behind the move was that CPJ felt that, since they focused mainly on federal issues, being closer to Parliament could help their cause. Their announcement explained that "public justice calls us to be where the conversations are happening and to bring our more than 40 years of insight, analysis and tested positions. CPJ has a vision of Canada that embraces pluralism, that asks who benefits from policies, and that puts forward helpful alternatives. A national office in Ottawa will let us advance that vision more effectively."

The move was accompanied by staff changes, and in 2008 Joe Gunn became the executive director of CPJ. In 2012, Joe Gunn was awarded the Queen's Diamond Jubilee Medal for his work in bringing faith communities together behind the Interfaith Call for Leadership and Action on Climate Change.

CPJ's founder Gerald Vandezande died in 2011 at the age of 77.

Joe Gunn completed his tenure at CPJ in January 2019. Willard Metzger, formerly of World Vision and Mennonite Church Canada, began his term as CPJ's fourth Executive Director in February 2019.

== Current work ==
=== Poverty in Canada ===
In 2009, Citizens for Public Justice and Canada Without Poverty founded Dignity for All, a non-partisan campaign which calls for a national anti-poverty plan for Canada. Every year on October 17, the Dignity for All campaign marks the International Day for the Eradication of Poverty with events across Canada.

The campaign has been endorsed by many MPs and Senators, including Canadian Prime Minister Justin Trudeau, NDP leader Thomas Mulcair, Green Party leader Elizabeth May; Senators Art Eggleton and Janis Johnson; Ministers Marc Garneau, Scott Brison, Carolyn Bennett, John McCallum, and Kirsty Duncan; and MPs Scott Armstrong, Gerry Byrne, Nathan Cullen, Joyce Murray, Niki Ashton, and Charlie Angus. As well, over 700 organizations and 11,000 individuals have signed the Dignity for All call to action.

CPJ assisted in establishing the All-Party Anti-Poverty Caucus. The group, made up of MPs and senators of all parties, meets regularly to discuss concrete policy proposals that will end poverty in Canada. In 2011, CPJ helped to gather interfaith leaders in Ottawa to sign the Interfaith Declaration on Poverty in Canada. Signatories included the Canadian Council of Churches, The Canadian Interfaith Delegation – World Religions Summit 2010, the Evangelical Fellowship of Canada, and the Dignity for All campaign.

In Spring 2015, CPJ organized "Justice Tour 2015", a delegation of national church leaders who traveled to eight cities to engage people of faith in conversations about poverty in Canada and climate change. Following the tour, CPJ helped to coordinate "On Promoting Climate Justice and Ending Poverty in Canada", an inter-faith declaration from Canadian faith leaders. This was the first such declaration in four years and was endorsed by over 65 signatories.

The Dignity for All campaign released its model National Anti-Poverty Plan for Canada in 2015. The day after this release, MPs passed a nearly-unanimous motion calling on the government "to eradicate child poverty in Canada by developing a national poverty reduction plan." In 2015, the federal government announced plans to develop a plan. The campaign was active during the federal government's 2017 consultation regarding its forthcoming national anti-poverty plan.

Every October, CPJ releases a report on poverty in Canada. In 2018, CPJ released "Poverty Trends 2018". The report shows the unequal impact of poverty on certain groups, such as new immigrants, families led by single mothers, un-attached adults, youth, and Indigenous people. It also presents poverty rates for each province and territory as well as many big cities and small communities across Canada.

=== Ecological justice ===
Building on its history of environmental engagement – including the successful call for a moratorium on the Mackenzie Valley Pipeline in the 1970s and the introduction of municipal recycling programs in the 1980s – CPJ supports effective action to combat climate change and reduce greenhouse gas emissions. CPJ is a member of Climate Action Network Canada and the Green Economy Network.

In 2011, CPJ and the Canadian Council of Churches developed the Canadian Interfaith Call for Leadership and Action on Climate Change, an ecumenical statement endorsed by over 60 faith institutions in Canada. CPJ's then Executive Director, Joe Gunn, contributed a chapter entitled "Taxes and Ecological Justice?" to the book The Great Revenue Robbery from Canadians for Tax Fairness. Then in 2012, the Pembina Institute recognized Gunn as a "Clean Energy Champion".

In 2014, CPJ published Living Faithfully into a New Climate, a series of faith and climate resources linked to the UN Climate Summit in New York. Later the same year, CPJ coordinated an interfaith prayer vigil to mark COP20 in Lima. In 2015, CPJ coordinated an interfaith, cross-Canada prayer chain throughout the two weeks of international climate negotiations at COP21 in Paris. This was followed in 2016 by a series of actions through which CPJ mobilized Canadians and called for a Canadian climate action plan that establishes a new emissions reduction target and contributes towards meeting Canada's commitment in the Paris Agreement.

CPJ launched a new campaign in 2017 called "Give it up for the Earth!". During Lent, Christian across Canada made personal pledges to reduce their carbon footprint. The campaign also included a postcard calling on the Canadian government to pursuing policy changes to fight climate change and meet the Paris Agreement. This campaign has continued in 2019, with a focus on a more far-reaching national climate policy, including a just transition to clean energy and an end to public financing of the fossil fuel sector.

=== Refugee rights ===
CPJ has spoken out against policies that disregard refugee rights in Canada including cuts to the Interim Federal Health program, the Safe Third Country Agreement, and long wait times for privately sponsored refugees.

In 2013, CPJ joined the Canadian Council for Refugees' Proud to Protect Refugees campaign. CPJ was also involved in getting church leaders to sign onto the 2013 Human Rights Day Statement which included 47 prominent signatories. CPJ welcomed the Canadian government's plan to resettle 25,000 Syrian refugees in Canada. CPJ joined many faith groups in releasing the "Inter-faith Statement on Syrian Refugees" in 2014, affirming and insisting that discriminating by religion is unacceptable when resettling Syrian refugees.

In April 2017, CPJ released "A Half Welcome", a report on private sponsorship issues in Canada highlights refugee sponsorship agreements holders' (SAHs) top concerns with federal government policy, including long wait times, long wait times for non-Syrian applications, allocations limits, and travel loans.

In June 2018, CPJ released "Reclaiming Protection", calling for an overhaul to the Safe Third Country Agreement, a policy that allows the Canada Border Services Agency to refuse most refugee claims made at the Canada-U.S. border. The report argues that by rescinding the policy, Canada can better uphold its international obligations to refugees, as well as the rights of refugees to receive due process.

CPJ's latest refugee report, "The Most Vulnerable", released April 2019, examines how the federal Government, Churches, and Advocacy Groups can apply an intersectional approach to their respective areas of policy-making and advocacy efforts.

=== Other issues ===
CPJ also comments on other issues such as:

- Housing and Homelessness
- Guaranteed Livable Income
- Federal Budgets
- Pluralism
- Electoral Reform
- Indigenous Justice
- Taxation

== Publications ==
=== the Catalyst ===
CPJ publishes the Catalyst three times per year. The first edition was published in 1978. It includes feature articles on faith and Canadian public policy as well as current activities and events at CPJ. The Catalyst regularly wins awards at the Canadian Church Press annual award ceremony.

=== Books ===
- Journeys to Justice: Reflections on Canadian Christian Activism (2018)

By Joe Gunn, the executive director of Citizens for Public Justice. The book contains essays on the contributions made by Canada's faith communities in a wide range of areas including refugee policy, the environment, women's rights, economic justice, and the fight against apartheid.

- Living Ecological Justice: A Biblical Response to the Environmental Crisis (2013)

Edited by Rev. Dr. Mishka Lysack and Karri Munn-Venn. "Living Ecological Justice" is a worship and action guide for churches and small groups. It is made up of three sections entitled, "Protecting What We Love", "The Biblical Case for Creation Advocacy", and "Towards Abundant Life for All Creation".

- Living Justice: A Gospel Response to Poverty (2011)

Edited by Rev. Adam Snook and Karri Munn-Venn. Living Justice is book of reflections, prayers, and actions for churches and small groups. It includes four parts on material, emotional, community, and spiritual poverty.

- Globalization and Christian Hope: Economy in the Service of Life (2003)

By Bob Goudzwaard and Leo Andringa.

- Nation to Nation: Aboriginal Sovereignty and the Future of Canada (2002)

By John Bird, Lorraine Land, and Murray MacAdam. "Nation to Nation" is a compilation of 18 articles that give an overview of Aboriginal-Canadian relations and proposals for the future. Topics covered include the Innu struggle, residential schools, the Nisga'a treaty, land claims, women and self-government, the birth of Nunavut, and solidarity strategies.

- Justice, Not Just Us: Faith Perspectives and National Priorities (1999)

By Gerald Vandezande. "Justice, Not Just Us" includes a collection of essays that outline a public justice approach to such issues as child poverty, economic inequality, national unity, and educational injustice.

- The Advent of Justice: A Book of Meditations (1993)

By Brian Walsh, Richard Middleton, Mark Vander Vennen, and Sylvia Keesmaat. The Advent of Justice was published in 1993 to celebrate the 30th anniversary of the CJL Foundation and Citizens for Public Justice (CPJ).

- Christians in the Crisis: Toward Responsible Citizenship (1983)

By Gerald Vandezande.

- Moratorium: Justice, Energy, the North, and the Native People (1977)

By Hugh McCullum, Karmel McCullum, and John Olthuis.
