= John Porter (sociologist) =

Canadian sociologist

John Arthur Porter (November 12, 1921 – June 15, 1979) was a Canadian sociologist from 1950 to the late 1970s. His work in the field of social stratification opened up new areas of inquiry for many sociologists in Canada.

Porter was born in Vancouver and completed his education at the London School of Economics in the United Kingdom. There, he became interested in studies of social class. On returning to Canada he joined the faculty of Carleton University. He remained at Carleton as a professor, and later, as department chairman, dean, and academic vice-president. He was also a visiting professor at Harvard and the University of Toronto.

== Early life ==
At 15, John Porter's father lost his job in Vancouver and his family moved to England in search of stable work. Luck, however, was not found. The depression had devastated both the Canadian and British economies and, after a short while of wrestling with his own poverty-induced depression, Porter’s father abandoned his family. John who had left high school in Vancouver was never able to return as he searched and worked for subsistence. Known for being a gifted student who had a particular proficiency in creative writing, he continued his studies informally with his mother—a schoolteacher.

War broke out and in 1941 Porter joined the Canadian Army as an intelligence officer, towards the end of the war in 1943, he was part of the Allied invasion of Italy and Sicily. After the war, he worked with a colonel in London writing a history of Canada's involvement in the war while studying for the entrance exam to the London School of Economics—which he passed on his first attempt. He joined the school at a particularly important ferment: while the university had abandoned its social democratic and Fabian roots, its professors and students were heavily influenced by liberal reformism which, in the words of one commentator, was "a widely shared belief that the irrationality of war and suffering could be eliminated by the judicious application of humane rationality specifically manifested in the form of a generous and intelligent welfare state." Reflecting upon his time as the LSE Porter notes that he was most animated by "a concern for ethical principles in social life."

In 1949 he graduated and, after a twelve-year hiatus, returned to Canada. He was offered a job teaching political science at the adolescent Carleton College and, two years later, switched to Sociology – becoming the school's first appointment in the field. Eventually, he was told that to retain his job he would have to get a graduate degree or begin publishing in a meaningful way. As such, in the early 1950s, he began the project that, fifteen years later, would culminate in the production of The Vertical Mosaic. The idea for the project had found its genesis at the LSE where, he had told his PhD supervisor, he wanted to "write an interpretation of Canada as a modern democracy."

== Vertical mosaic ==
The Vertical Mosaic: An Analysis of Social Class and Power in Canada, Porter's most important work, was published in 1965 by University of Toronto Press. It was the study of equality of opportunity and the exercise of power by bureaucratic, economic and political elites in Canada. Porter was concerned with challenging the image that Canada was a classless society with "no barriers to opportunity." Porter concludes The Vertical Mosaic with the following observations:

Canada is probably not unlike other Western industrial nations in relying heavily on its elite groups to make major decisions and to determine the shape and direction of its development. The nineteenth-century notion of a liberal citizen-participating democracy is obviously not a satisfactory model by which to examine the processes of decision-making in either the economic or the political contexts... If power and decision-making must always rest with elite groups, there can at least be open recruitment from all classes into the elite. (p. 558).

Porter argues that Marxist class analysis, based on ownership of the means of production is a "questionable criterion of class in modern industrial society" (p. 25). Porter rejects power as the basis for social class, with the observation that conflict between those with power and the powerless is nonexistent. Porter constructs a new model based on the study of elites.

Elites are those who make decisions in the hierarchical institutional systems of modern society. Porter describes elites in the following way:

...individuals or groups at the top of our institutions can be designated as elites. Elites both compete and cooperate with one another: they compete to share in the making of decisions of major importance for the society, and they cooperate because together they keep the society working as a going concern. Elites govern institutions that have, in the complex world, functional tasks... It is elites who have the capacity to introduce change... (p. 27).

== Legacy ==
Porter's analysis is essentially conflict theorist. While some aspects were inspired by Marxist thinking, he was at pains to present a non-Marxian approach. The nature of the Canadian capitalist class led Porter to develop his model. Notably, it was against his work that scholars in the 1970s began to develop a more contemporary, cultural, and Marxist idea of a class that defined it not in terms of occupational rank but in terms of power relationships. Indeed, if there is one area of Porter's work that intellectuals are most critical of it is his overly functionalist definition of class and power that closes down other avenues of critical thought: as Pat Armstrong writes, "by conceptualizing class in this manner, Porter left out of the theory many of the ways power is used to ensure male dominance in class relations and how those relations shift over time, often through struggle."

He noted that this class in the 1950s was a tightly knit group of wealthy, predominantly British-descended men, centred in Montreal, Quebec and Toronto, Ontario. This group controlled Canada's financial, industrial and political spheres. While there appeared to be one elite, Porter found that there were actually several elite groups, comprising economic, political, labour, and ideological realms. His work thus echoes and expands on United States sociologist C. Wright Mills' study of power elites in the United States.

In 1965, the year The Vertical Mosaic was published, sociology, as a discipline, had virtually no academic or mainstream currency: nationwide there were only 115 university-based sociologists. There was no national sociology textbook, the closest thing being a volume, compiled by Porter, which featured a loose collection of Canadian Sociology readings. Further, while contemporary Canadian sociology is marked by its breadth of topics and questions – class, power, race, education, ability, work, gender – and, frankly, a commitment to a left-leaning politic, none of this was true in 1965. The publication of The Vertical Mosaic did, thus, three things: first, it established sociology as a legitimate discipline in the Canadian context; second, it pioneered a macrosociological approach that put class at the centre of its analysis and, third, it constituted an initial offering in the emergent field of inequality studies and diversity studies. Indeed, Rick Helmes-Hayes argues that the book set the tone, parameters of debate and questions for the next fifteen years in sociology.

The Vertical Mosaic led to the adoption of the term cultural mosaic by Canadian government agencies such as Statistics Canada, but Porter himself was an opponent of Canada's multiculturalism policy.

Porter, along with Peter Pineo, developed the Pineo-Porter index of socioeconomic status.

To honour Porter's importance in developing sociology in Canada, the Canadian Sociology and Anthropology Association initiated an annual award called the Porter award.

Shortly before his death in 1979, he put together ten of his most significant essays in The Measure of Canadian Society: Education, Equality, and Opportunity. He died in Ottawa later that year, due to a heart attack.

== See also ==
- Social history of Canada
