= Canada Without Poverty =

Not-for-profit organization in Canada

- Established: 1971
- Type: Nonprofit, Charity
- VAT ID no.: 130916638RR0001
- Headquarters: 334 MacLaren St., Suite 300; Ottawa, Ontario K2P 0M6
- Location: Canada
- Coordinates: 45.4151°N 75.6943°W
- Leader: Harriett McLachlan (as at 2023)
- Website: cwp-csp.ca
- Formerly called: National Anti-Poverty Organization

Canada Without Poverty (CWP) is a not-for-profit organization dedicated to eradicating poverty in Canada and educating Canadians about the link between poverty and human rights.

CWP is based in Ottawa, with a second office in Vancouver and is run by a board of directors who have, or have had, personal experiences of poverty.

CWP campaigned for the development of consistent poverty indicators, which can be used to effectively help the estimated 1 in 15 (2.4 million) Canadians living in conditions of poverty.

CWP has had partnerships with the Red Tents Campaign, Dignity for All: the campaign for a poverty-free Canada, Voices - Voix, and the BC Poverty Reduction Coalition.

== Origins ==
CWP was founded in 1971 as a registered charity. It was an outgrowth of the Poor People's Conference which took place in Toronto in 1971, organized by the National Council of Welfare (NCW), under the auspices of the Canadian Minister of National Health and Welfare. The original name of the organization was the National Anti-Poverty Organization (NAPO). This name was changed to Canada Without Poverty (CWP) in 2009.

The charity was organized to become a main umbrella of nationwide anti-poverty activists; its mandate was to identify the causes of poverty and to promote poverty eradication and human rights. Beginning in 1973, NAPO presented its first research document on hunger and food costs to the Federal Parliament. It continued to address poverty-related issues, advocating for better health care, higher unemployment insurance benefits, fairer taxation, family benefits, recognition of homelessness and women's poverty, and/or the fundamental human rights of people living in poverty. It has acted as liaison between community groups and the Parliament in power.

In the 1990s NAPO began to expand its forums to regional and international discussions about poverty eradication. Areas of discussion included concerns about homelessness, women's poverty issues, wage inequality, the growing attack on the poor, the result of neoliberal shifts towards the downsizing of government and dismantling of social programs. From addressing the UN to co-hosting conferences at the regional and international level, NAPO drew powerful connections between reality of poverty in Canada and growing poverty as a result of globalization.

In the 1993 it convened a second Poor People's Conference and co-hosted a UN Poverty Roundtable in 1998 to deal with poverty in the Americas.

In the 2000s it published studies and began a national campaign for a new minimum wage. It also championed the rights of homeless people and won a legal case against the City of Winnipeg which was forced to repeal a by-law prohibiting panhandling.

== Mission ==
The mission of CWP is to relieve poverty in Canada by educating Canadians about the human and financial cost of poverty and by identifying public policy solutions. These 'costs' include financial and 'human'. CWP works with people from government, business and community groups to influence legislative priorities at the federal level regarding income and social support needs. CWP uses a human rights framework which states that all Canadians have a right to equality and dignity and expects social institutions to uphold the values of caring, responsibility, and accountability based on UN concepts of fundamental human rights.

Louise Arbour, Chief Prosecutor at the Hague International War Tribunals and an Honorary Director of CWP, has stated "poverty prevails as the gravest human rights challenge in the world". In Canada, inequalities of access to social and economic resources contribute significantly to poverty levels across Canada, i.e., those in poverty are often First Nation people, immigrants and refugees, single adults between the ages of 45-64, and single mothers with children, disabled, those in the lowest-paying jobs, full or part-time. People in poverty in Canada more often access food banks, are often homeless, or in low-cost, sub-standard housing; they are part of the 'working poor' who rely on low wages, or are stuck in the poverty trap of welfare, and face hunger.

== Activities and impacts/successes ==
In 2006 the Federal Government cut the funding to CWP and other anti-poverty groups, seriously impeding their work. The Canadian Council for International Co-operation, a group involved in global poverty reduction and connected to CWP, is threatened with complete funding cuts. However, the organization has refused to simply stop operating. In 2009, Canada Without Poverty adopted a new logo that "symbolizes rising above one's poverty line towards a bright future".

The need for greater pressure is evident in the erosion of concern of the Federal government to address poverty. Poverty deeply impacted individuals, families, society and costs governments perhaps as much as $80 billion in 2015. and over $300 billion in 2022. Individually it is characterized by people having to make tough choices between meeting basic needs like deciding whether to eat, buy new shoes, pay the rent etc. Studies have found poverty is strongly associated with poorer health, physical and emotional, alcohol and drug abuse, recidivism in the criminal justice system, class divides that threaten Canadian social stability, and higher early mortality rates among those living in poverty.

=== Campaigns ===
CWP has been involved in a number of significant, comprehensive campaigns including: "Dignity for All: The Campaign for a Poverty-Free Canada", a campaign that was co-founded in 2009 with Citizens for Public Justice. This campaign focused on three fundamental "wants" in order to address the "structural causes of poverty in Canada" . This project was supported by over 550 Canadian anti-poverty groups (including Acorn Canada, and Alberta Human Rights Commission and almost 130 Members of Parliament and 15 Senators.

CWP was involved in writing Bill C-233, An Act to eliminate poverty in Canada (formerly Bill C-545). The original bill died on the floor in 2010, although it was reintroduced into Parliament by NDP MP Jean Crowder.

In 2022, CWP was awarded Sustainable Development Goals Program Funding for the Lived Experience Community 2030 project. CWP worked on 4 of the 17 SDGs: (1) No Poverty, (2) Zero Hunger, (10) Reduced Inequalities, and (11) Sustainable Cities and Communities.

== Organizational features ==
Current and past CWP Board of Directors are primarily drawn from poverty activists, all of whom have lived in poverty themselves, either as children and/or as adults. In 2012 there were nine board members who lived in regions across the country. All continued to work as activists representing various communities from First Nations to immigrants to urban and rural citizens.

In September 2012, Leilani Farha became CWP executive director. From June 2014 until 2020, she was appointed as the United Nations Special Rapporteur on Adequate Housing which she carried out in addition to her CWP role. As at 2023, Farha is honorary legal advisor to CWP.

The current board president is Harriett McLachlan.

CWP also has an Honorary Board, made up of Canadian political leaders including former Federal NDP leader Ed Broadbent, former Prime Minister Joe Clark, former Member of Parliament Monique Bégin and former Canadian Supreme Court Justice Louise Arbour. The fifth Honorary Board member is Ovide Mercredi, a Cree who serves as the Chief of the Misipawistik Cree Nation.

In February 2012, Elizabeth May, the Green Party of Canada leader joined an all-party panel discussion on poverty organized by the Dignity for All Campaign to ensure adequate discussion on issues relating to the low-income population remain on the public agenda.

In 2015 CWP employed four employees to fulfill all administrative affairs, including fund raising, communications, and organizing the various events and campaigns along with the assistance of numerous volunteers.
