= Andrew Stawicki =

Canadian photo journalist

Andrew Stawicki is a Polish-Canadian photo journalist and media entrepreneur. He began his career in Poland, and he emigrated to Canada in 1982 to join the staff of the Toronto Star. In 1990 he co-founded the non-profit, cooperative photography collective, PhotoSensitive. His most notable work is that of prominent Canadians, including a photograph of Leonard Cohen barefoot in his backyard and a photo of Mordecai Richler that appeared on the cover of Walrus magazine. In 2018, Stawicki was awarded the Meritorious Service Cross by the Governor General of Canada for his work with PhotoSensitive.

== Publications ==
=== Publications with others ===
Cohen, David Elliot; Rick Smolan (1984). A Day in the Life of Canada. Collins Publishers. ISBN 978-0-00-217380-3.

Cohen, David Elliot; Rick Smolan (1985). A Day in the Life of Japan. Collins Pub San Francisco. ISBN 978-0-00-217580-7.

Cohen, David Elliot; Rick Smolan (1986). A Day in the Life of America. Collins Pub San Francisco. ISBN 978-0-00-255332-2.

Cohen, David Elliot; Rick Smolan (1987). A Day in the Life of The Soviet Union. Harpercollins. ISBN 978-0-00-217969-0.

Kenna, Kathlee; Andrew Stawicki (1995). A People Apart. HMH Books for Young Readers. ISBN 978-0395673447.
