= Leilani Farha =

Canadian human rights lawyer and housing advocate

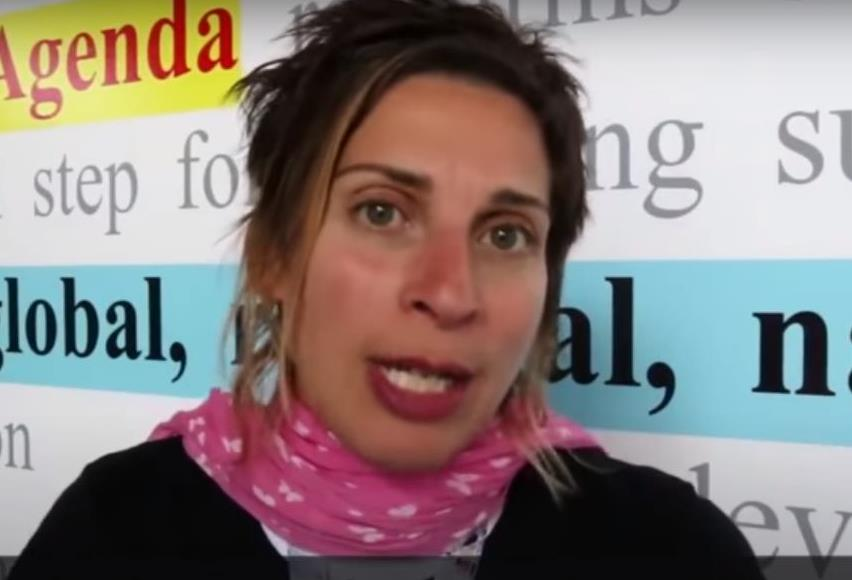
- Farha in 2017
- Born: 1968 (age 57–58); Ottawa, Ontario, Canada
- Education: University of Toronto (LLB, MSW)
- Occupations: Lawyer, housing advocate
- Organization: The Shift
- Known for: United Nations special rapporteur on the right to adequate housing (2014–2020); 2026 CBC Massey Lecturer
- Notable work: Housing Inc.: A Global Takeover and Our Fight for Home (2026)
- Title: Global director
- Children: 2
- Website: www.leilanifarha.com

Leilani Farha (born 1968) is a Canadian human rights lawyer and housing advocate. She is the global director of The Shift, an international organization advocating for housing as a human right. From 2014 to 2020, she served as the United Nations special rapporteur on the right to adequate housing.

Farha was selected to deliver the 2026 CBC Massey Lectures. Her lectures, titled Housing Inc.: A Global Takeover and Our Fight for Home, examine the treatment of housing as a financial asset and its effects on tenants, Indigenous peoples and people experiencing homelessness.

== Early and personal life ==
Farha was born in Ottawa in 1968 to Lebanese-Canadian parents. She attended Elmwood School in Ottawa and later studied English literature at the University of Toronto.

Farha has said that Palestinian politics were frequently discussed by her family during her childhood and that her family lost land during the 1948 Nakba. This background later influenced her decision to undertake a human rights internship in the Palestinian territories while studying law. She is married and has two children. She lives in Ottawa.

== Education and career ==
Farha earned a bachelor's degree in English literature followed by a Bachelor of Laws and a Master of Social Work from the University of Toronto. Her graduate work examined the right to housing of Palestinians in the occupied Palestinian territories. She has taught at the law faculties of the University of Toronto and the University of Windsor.

Farha served for twelve years as executive director of the Centre for Equality Rights in Accommodation. In September 2012, she became executive director of Canada Without Poverty, where her work included housing rights, homelessness, poverty and inequality.

== United Nations special rapporteur ==
Farha was appointed United Nations special rapporteur on the right to adequate housing by the United Nations Human Rights Council in 2014 and served until 2020. In that role, she undertook investigations and advocacy visits to countries including India, Egypt, Chile and Portugal. She presented reports to the United Nations concerning homelessness, the financialization of housing and governments' obligations under international human rights law.

During a 2018 visit to California, Farha compared some of the conditions experienced by homeless people there with conditions she had encountered in informal settlements elsewhere. She argued that the scale of homelessness in a wealthy country reflected political choices rather than a lack of resources.

Following the Grenfell Tower fire, Farha expressed concern that residents had not been adequately involved in decisions about the building's safety or in the investigations following the fire. She said that unsafe cladding, electrical systems and inadequate access for emergency vehicles could engage the right to safe and adequate housing.

Farha was featured in Fredrik Gertten's 2019 documentary film Push, which follows her efforts to investigate the financialization of housing.

== The Shift ==
Farha launched The Shift in 2017 with the Office of the United Nations High Commissioner for Human Rights and United Cities and Local Governments. The initiative advocates for housing to be treated as a human right rather than primarily as a commodity or investment vehicle. After completing her term as special rapporteur, Farha continued the initiative's work as its global director.

== 2026 Massey Lectures ==
Farha was selected as the 2026 CBC Massey Lecturer. Her lecture series, Housing Inc.: A Global Takeover and Our Fight for Home, examines the political and financial decisions that transformed housing into a global investment asset.

The accompanying book was published by House of Anansi Press on 8 September 2026. Farha connects the financialization of housing with displacement, homelessness and the dispossession of Indigenous peoples. She argues for a housing system based on human rights rather than the accumulation of wealth and proposes drawing on human rights law, Indigenous approaches to land and the arts when reimagining housing policy.

== Selected works ==
- Farha, Leilani (2026). Housing Inc.: A Global Takeover and Our Fight for Home. Toronto: House of Anansi Press. ISBN 978-1-4870-1428-5.

== See also ==
- Human rights defender
- International human rights law
- Right to housing
