= Financial support =

Financial support may refer to:

- Funding for a project provided by an investor
- Funding provided in the form of a grant.
