= Caledon Institute of Social Policy =

Canadian think tank

- Formation: 1992
- Type: Public policy think tank
- Headquarters: 1354 Wellington Street, 3rd Floor
- Location: Ottawa, ON K1Y 3C3
- President: Ken Battle
- Website: www.caledoninst.ca

The Caledon Institute of Social Policy, also Caledon Institute, was a private Canadian think tank focused on social policy.

== History ==
It was founded in 1992. It wound down its day-to-day operations in 2017 and its archive of articles can be found on the Maytree website.

== Funder ==
It is primarily funded by the Maytree Foundation.

== Subtle Impact ==
The Caledon Institute does not have much public visibility and is infrequently in the news; however, it is thought to play a significant role behind the scenes, as is evident by frequent contact with government departments relative to more visible Canadian think tanks.

== See also ==
- Think tanks in Canada
