= Rural Canada =

Areas in Canada outside of census metropolitan areas and census agglomerations

Rural areas in Canada, often called rural Canada, generally refers to areas in Canada outside of census metropolitan areas and census agglomerations, according to Statistics Canada. Rural areas cover approximately 9,197,138 km^{2} (3,551,035 sq mi) of Canada's land area as of 2015.

Rural Canada is usually defined by low population density, small population size, and distance from major agglomerations.

As of the 2021 census, nearly 6 million people (16% of the total Canadian population) lived in rural areas of Canada. In the 2006 census, the Canadian population living in a rural area was between 19% and 30% of the total population, depending on the definition of "rural" used.

== Census ==
In Statistics Canada’s definition, "rural area" refers to areas in Canada outside of census metropolitan areas and census agglomerations.

This definition has changed over time.

== See also ==
- Cottage country
- List of villages in Canada
- List of towns in Canada
- List of rural municipalities in Alberta
- List of rural municipalities in Manitoba
- List of rural municipalities in Prince Edward Island
- List of rural municipalities in Saskatchewan
