= Social history of Canada =

Branch of Canadian studies

The Social history of Canada is a branch of Canadian studies dealing with Social History, focusing on the history of ordinary people and their strategies of coping with life. It pays special attention to women, children, old age, workers, ethnic and racial groups and demographic patterns. The field emerged in the 1960s and had a "golden age" in the 1970s. It continues as a major research field for historians. Social history is an umbrella approach that links to other approaches. For example, Hoerder (2005) argues that by employing the approaches and methods of social history, scholars can gain a better and more inclusive understanding of Canadian economic history. Among the subjects that would enrich such an understanding are family economies and the diversity of people's social lives. Additionally, a sociological approach would lead to a more comprehensive analysis of the state and its constituent parts.

== New social history ==
The older social history (before 1960) included numerous topics that were not part of the mainstream historiography of political, military, diplomatic and constitutional history. The "new social history" exploded on the scene in the 1960s, quickly becoming one of the dominant styles of historiography in the U.S., Britain and Canada. After 1990 social history was increasingly challenged by cultural history, which emphasizes language and the importance of beliefs and assumptions and their causal role in group behavior.

== Family history ==
Family history emerged as a separate field in the 1970s, with close ties to anthropology and sociology. The trend was especially pronounced in the U.S. and Canada. It emphasizes on demographic patterns, and public policy. It is quite separate from Genealogy, though often drawing on the same primary sources such as censuses and family records.

=== Urban history ===
The "new urban history" emerged in the 1960s seeking to understand the "city as process" and, through quantitative methods, to learn more about the inarticulate masses in the cities, as opposed to the mayors and elites. A major early study was Michael B. Katz, The People of Hamilton, Canada West (1976)

== Golden Age of Nova Scotia? ==
The work of the new social historians can be seen in their study of social structure and its change over time. Several scholars have explored the so-called "golden age" of the Maritimes in the years just before Confederation. In Nova Scotia, the population grew steadily from 277,000 in 1851 to 388,000 in 1871, mostly from natural increase since immigration was slight. The era has been called a golden age, but that was a myth created in the 1930s to lure tourists to a romantic era of tall ships and antiques. Recent historians using census data have shown that is a fallacy. In 1851-1871 there was an overall increase in per capita wealth holding. However most of the gains went to the urban elite class, especially businessmen and financiers living in Halifax. The wealth held by the top 10% rose considerably over the two decades, but there was little improvement in the wealth levels in rural areas, which comprised the great majority of the population. Likewise Gwyn reports that gentlemen, merchants, bankers, colliery owners, shipowners, shipbuilders, and master mariners flourished. However the great majority of families were headed by farmers, fishermen, craftsmen and laborers. Most of them-and many widows as well—lived in poverty. Out migration became an increasingly necessary option. Thus the era was indeed a golden age but only for a small but powerful and highly visible elite.

== See also ==
- Culture of Canada
- Demographics of Canada
- History of cities in Canada
- History of Canada
- Social history
- Poverty in Canada
- Who Killed Canadian History?
