= National Council of Welfare =

Canadian federal advisory body

The National Council of Welfare (NCW) was a Canadian arm's length advisory body to the federal Minister of Human Resources and Skills Development on poverty and the realities of low-income Canadians.

Its legal mandate was to "advise the Minister of Human Resources and Skills Development in respect of any matter relating to social development that the Minister may refer to the Council for its consideration or that the Council considers appropriate".

The Council consisted of members drawn from across Canada and appointed by the Governor-in-Council. All members served in their personal capacities rather than as representatives of organizations or agencies.

The Council published reports and communicated with the Minister on a wide range of issues involving poverty and public policy. It also presented submissions to Parliamentary Committees and Royal Commissions and participated in a range of government and non-government workshops and events on poverty-related issues.

It released regular publications about the level and adequacy of welfare incomes in Canada and statistical profiles of poverty in Canada.

The Council also published special topic reports, for example, 'The Dollars & Sense of Solving Poverty'. Over the years, subjects included:

- A National Anti-Poverty Strategy
- Aboriginal Children And Youth
- Poverty Lines And Statistics
- Income Security Programs And Policies
- The Cost Of Poverty
- Child Benefits
- The Tax System
- The Retirement Income System
- Employment Programs
- Social Services, Such As Child Care And Child Welfare
- Legal Services
- Women And Children

The National Council of Welfare was first established in legislation in 1962 [Chapter 16, Statutes of Canada 1962-63 amending the Department of Health and Welfare]. The members consisted of the Deputy Minister of Welfare and the Deputy Ministers of Provincial Departments of Welfare, among others. It was intended that the Council act in an advisory capacity to the Minister of Health and Welfare on matters relating to welfare.

The Council was completely reconstituted in 1969 under the Government Organization Act. Official federal and provincial government appointees were excluded and representation was changed to include persons from non-government sources with experience in fields such as labour, teaching and welfare, as well as persons in receipt of one form or other of welfare benefits.

In a press release [January 19, 1970] announcing the establishment of the new National Council of Welfare, the Minister of Health and Welfare, John Munro, stated that:

There has been a great deal of talk about the need to create opportunities for the poor to participate in the development of programs aimed at combating poverty … I believe that this Council can make an important contribution to achieving that end.

One of the early activities of the Council was to develop a proposal for the first national conference of representatives of organizations of the poor. The Poor People’s Conference was held in Toronto in January 1971. At the conference, over 500 delegates representing more than 250 anti-poverty groups passed resolutions aimed at fighting poverty in Canada. One of the resolutions was to form a national organization. This led to the creation of the National Anti-Poverty Organization later that year (now called Canada Without Poverty).

Following this stance, the Council advocated in 1976 for the implementation of the guaranteed annual income in Canada.

When the Department of Health and Welfare was split in 1993, the Council moved with the welfare/income security side of the department to advise the Minister of the newly formed Human Resources Development Canada (HRDC) [Bill C-11, an Act to establish the Department of Human Resources Development]. When HRDC was reorganized in 2003, the Council became an advisory group to the Minister of Social Development [Bill C-22, an Act to establish the Department of Social Development]. Currently, the Council advises the Minister of Human Resources and Skills Development Canada HRSDC, a department that was formed in 2006 by merging the two departments of Social Development Canada and Human Resources and Skills Development Canada.

In 2012, the Canadian government under Prime Minister Stephen Harper cut the entire budget of the National Council of Welfare, effectively closing the Council.

== See also ==
- Poverty in Canada
