= Poverty in Canada =

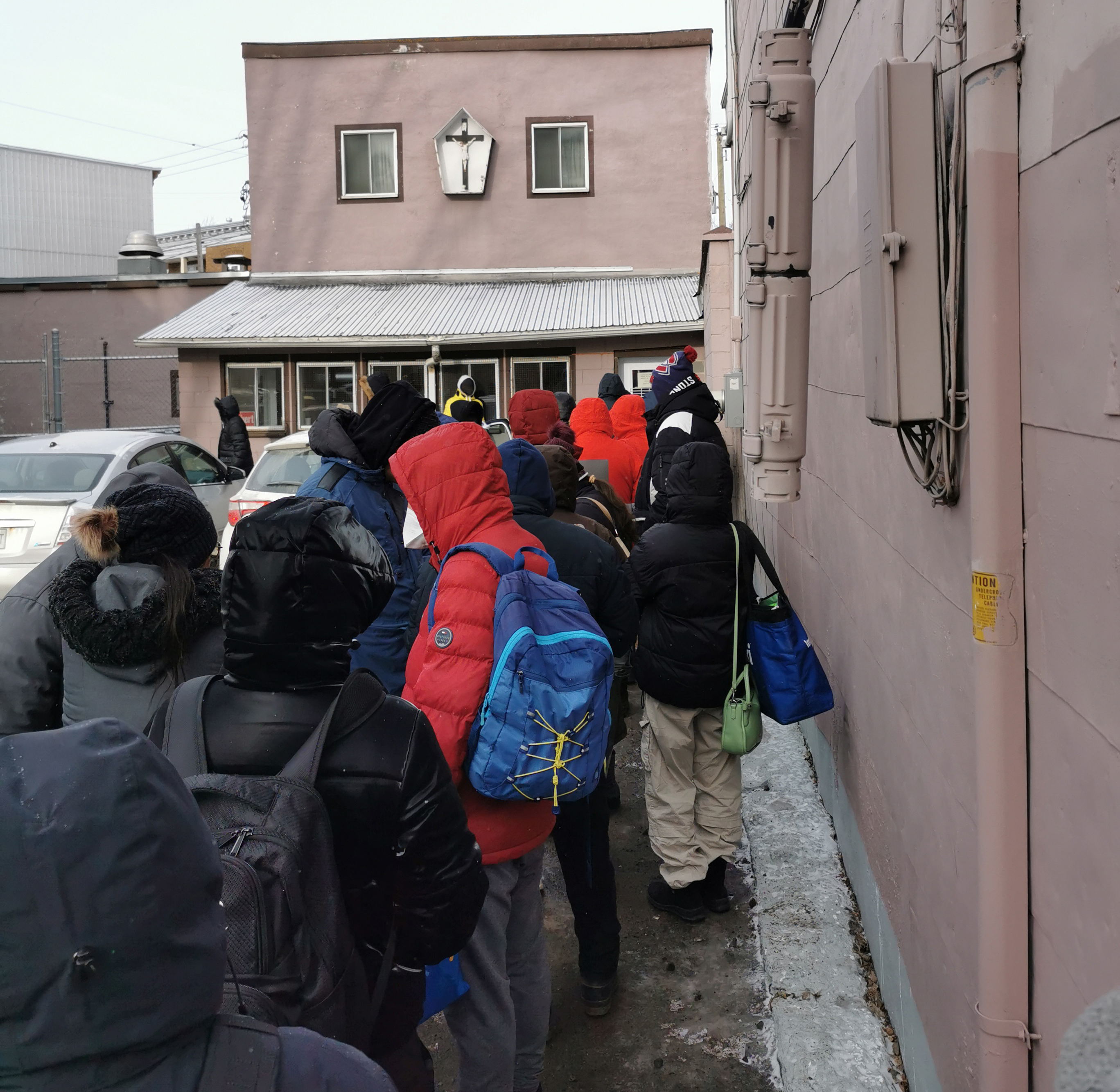
Unemployed people lining up outside a community soup kitchen in Quebec City

Poverty in Canada refers to the state or condition in which a person or household lacks essential resources—financial or otherwise—to maintain a modest standard of living in their community.

Researchers and governments have used different metrics to measure poverty in Canada including Low-Income Cut-Off (LICO), Low Income Measure (LIM), and Market Basket Measure (MBM). In November 2018, Employment and Social Development Canada announced the establishment of Canada's first Official Poverty Line to be based on the MBM. The MBM considers the cost of a basket of basic goods and services needed by a family of two adults and two children to maintain a modest standard of living.

There was an increase in poverty in Canada and many other industrial nations in the 1980s. By 2008, Canada's poverty rate was among the highest of Organisation for Economic Co-operation and Development (OECD) member nations—the wealthiest countries in the world.

The number of people living below the official poverty line decreased substantially from 14.5% in 2015 to 10.1% in 2019, and 6.4% in 2020.

Child poverty in Canada declined since 2015, with the number of children who were living in poverty decreasing 71% by 2020. Child poverty has a disproportionately high effect on Indigenous households in Canada. According to a 2019 study by researchers at the Assembly of First Nations and the Canadian Centre for Policy Alternatives (CCPA), nearly 50% of Indigenous children in Canada—both on and off reserve—were living in poverty.

As of 2020, about 2.4 million Canadians, or 6.4% of the population, lived below the poverty line, according to Statistics Canada Canadian Income Survey, 2020 released on March 23, 2022.

== Current overview ==
The 2020 Canadian Income Survey (CIS) released in March 2022 by Employment and Social Development Canada (ESDC) said that there was a substantial decrease in the poverty rate from 14.5% in 2015 to 6.4% in 2020. This represents the largest 5-year decrease since 1976. Approximately 2.4 million Canadians are living below Canada's Official Poverty Line, based on 2020 income tax returns. While the results were encouraging, the ESDC minister cautioned that the 2020 Canadian Income Survey needs to be contextualized against the backdrop of "unprecedented and temporary government income support measures". In 2020, 84% of Canadians 15 and over received income from government transfers compared to 69% in 2015. Transfers included Old Age Security Pension (OAS)/Guaranteed Income Supplements (GIS), Canada Pension Plan (CPP)/Quebec Pension Plan (QPP) benefits, Employment Insurance (EI) benefits, and Child benefits. But the increase was mainly in the form of emergency and recovery benefits related to the COVID-19 pandemic in Canada, including COVID-19 Emergency and Recovery Benefit (ERB), Canada Recovery Benefit (CRB), Canada Recovery Caregiving Benefit (CRCB), Canada Recovery Sickness Benefit (CRSB), Canada Emergency Student Benefit (CESB) mainly through emergency and recovery benefits related to the COVID-19 pandemic.

In the age group 0 to 54 the prevalence of low income decreased sharply; there was a slight increase in the number of low income in those over 65.

The Gini coefficient declined from 0.343 in 2010 to 0.302 in 2020, which is an indicator of lower inequality.

== Defining poverty in Canada ==
Statistics Canada's 1968 report on Canadians' incomes provided the "basis for defining and measuring low incomes in Canada."

The 1971 Special Senate Committee on Poverty in Canada "brought poverty out of the shadows".

In 1976, Canada ratified the International Covenant on Economic, Social and Cultural Rights, which obligated the federal government to consider poverty as a human rights issue.

In his 2020 publication, The Global Politics of Poverty in Canada: Development Programs and Democracy, 1964–1979, historian Will Langford described the significance of development in the two decades of debates on "global politics of poverty" from the late 1950s through the late 1970s in response to the "profound inequalities" at both local and global levels. In liberal democracies, such as Canada at that time, development was seen as a viable tool for poverty alleviation. Langford described how this idealistic approach was ineffective in eliminated poverty in any meaningful way as poverty was embedded in "capitalist social relations and economic hierarchies".

The shift away from the welfare state took place in the late 1970s and 1980s, as national governments led by Margaret Thatcher in Britain in 1979, Ronald Reagan in the United States in 1980, Helmut Kohl in Germany in 1983, and Brian Mulroney in Canada 1984 adopted economic policies that favoured the free-market, globalization, free trade, and reductions in government spending with an accompanying increase in privatization. According to David Harvey, governments that implemented neoliberal policies focused on optimizing conditions for market activity and capital accumulation and stepped away from a social state and redistributive policies. In 2004, the World Health Organization (WHO) described these ideas as an "extension of the traditional liberal philosophy" or neo-Liberal—"the philosophy that underpins and drives economic globalization", supports the free market and capitalism by facilitating the "flow of goods, services and capital", limits government interference to corporations, and reducing public expenditures. These free market concepts and public policy recommendations were promoted by think tanks, libertarian organizations, and political parties, and are the subject of substantial scholarly debate. In Canada, the Fraser Institute and the Broadbent Institute provide arguments on both sides of these debates as they related to issues such as definitions of poverty.

The 2002 Senate Committees's report on "Poverty, Housing And Homelessness: Issues And Options", said that poverty, housing and homelessness remained as grave challenge a challenge in Canada as it had been in 1971 according to the 1971 Special Senate Committee on Poverty Poverty in Canada, but by 2002, the phenomena and the understanding of poverty, housing and homelessness had increased in complexity.

By 2013, there was a shift from poverty research, to income inequality at the international level in research and publications by the International Monetary Fund (IMF), the Organisation for Economic Co-operation and Development (OECD), and the World Economic Forum (WEF). By 2014, the WEF described the increasing wealth gap as the "biggest risk facing the world". A 2014 article in the journal Forum for Social Economics, said that neoliberal policies enacted since the 1980s resulted in a global trend of inequality in income distribution. An April 29, 2014 Administrators Colloquium organized by the Canada School of Public Service noted that there was a shift in research from poverty in Canada to examinations of income inequality, for example in the Standing Committee on Finance's December 2013 report.

Under its 2016 mandate to develop a national poverty reduction strategy, the federal department of Employment and Social Development Canada (ESDC) consulted with First Nations, Inuit and Métis communities, the three levels of government, and concerned communities. The resulting report—"Opportunity for All: Canada's First Poverty Reduction Strategy"—was released on August 21, 2018. It set the Market Basket Measure (MBM) as Canada's official measure of poverty, established Canada's first Official Poverty Line, and presented poverty reduction targets. Based on their research, the report expanded the definition of poverty to include not just monetary concerns but also "access to suitable housing, healthy and nutritious food, and health care." Poverty in Canada refers to the state or condition in which a person or community lacks essential resources, financial or otherwise, to maintain a modest standard of living. In November 2018, Employment and Social Development Canada announced the establishment of Canada's first Official Poverty Line to be based on the Market Basket Measure (MBM). The MBM considers the cost of a basket of basic goods and services needed by a family of two adults and two children to maintain a modest standard of living.

== Poverty measurement in Canada ==
A variety of poverty measurements have been used in Canada by researchers and governments to monitor the number and percentage of Canadians who live below the poverty line. This includes the including the Low-Income Cut-Off (LICO), Low Income Measure (LIM), and Market Basket Measure (MBM).

Tracking the number and percentage of Canadians who fall below Canada's Official Poverty Line can be used to measure the progress on and effectiveness of initiatives designed to lift Canadians out of poverty.

In August 2018, the federal government, under Prime Minister Justin Trudeau, adopted the Market Basket Measure (MBM) of poverty as the official poverty line, which will enable researchers and governments to measure how effective poverty reduction initiatives have been.

Based on the MBM, a March 2022 Statistics Canada report said that overall poverty in Canada had fallen from 14.5% in 2015 to 6.4% in 2020. This release provided estimates using the Canadian Income Survey that had been updated to include 2016 Census population estimates and thus estimates for the years 2012–2019 were also updated. Note also that current measures of poverty using the MBM rely on the 2018 base values and so cannot be compared with poverty statistics constructed using the 2008 MBM.

In the 2018 report on Canada's first poverty reduction strategy, "Opportunity for all" the goal to reduce the percentage of people in poverty to 10% by 2020 and to 6% by 2030.

=== Market Basket Measure (MBM) ===
Government of Canada is using the Market Basket Measure (MBM) of poverty as official poverty line since August 2018. The MBM was developed in 2003 and the MBM thresholds take into account community size, location and household and composition, estimating the disposable income required to meet basic needs. Forty eight Canadian communities have been included in the measure. The MBM was back-calculated until 2000 and in the years until 2009 was on average 10.4% with a high of 11.9% in 2000 and a low of 8.8% in 2007. The latest available value for 2020 reports the MBM based poverty rate at 6.4%.

Statistics Canada and ESDC—in collaboration with the Yukon and the Northwest Territories—have been designing a Northern Market Basket Measure (MBM-N) for use in the territories. The MBM-N would include food, clothing, transportation, shelter and other necessities in establishing the threshold. The MBM-N will also take into account the unique characteristics of life in Nunavut in measuring the official poverty line.

=== Low-Income Cut-Off ===
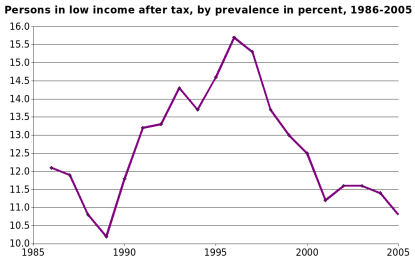
Source: Statistics Canada

In 1959, the federal government used the first set of published Low-Income Cut-Off (LICO) measurements to calculate an income threshold families were expected to spend on food, shelter and clothing below which a family will likely devote a larger share of its income than an average family would based on Statistics Canada's Family Expenditure Survey. If a family spends 20% more than the average Canadian family on these expenditures, they are considered to be below the LICO poverty line. A Canadian Council on Social Development backgrounder reported that the LICO has been reported by Statistics Canada since the 1960s.

Based on data from the 1992 Family Expenditures Survey, the average family spent 43% of its after-tax income on food, shelter and clothing. Statistics Canada added an additional 20% margin.

In 2000, Statistics Canada began to use the post-tax LICO rates for the first time, as well as the "pre-tax" rates. After-tax LICO rates going back to 1986, were retroactively calculated. As of 2011, 8.8% of Canadians are in a family whose income is below the after-tax low-income cut-off.

According to the Low-Income Cut-Off (LICO), there was a dramatic increase in poverty in Canada from the mid-1990s to 2020. LICO—which is updated annually for inflation but not for changes in spending patterns—measures the amount of money a family spends on necessities, such as housing, food and clothing, as determined by federal public servants. LICO measurements have been questioned. By 2007, Low-Income Cut-Off (LICO) rates were often quoted by the media as a measure of poverty even though Statistics Canada had stated that it was not a poverty measure.

As of 2011, 8.8% of Canadians were in a family whose income is below the after-tax low-income cut-off.

As of 2004, Statistics Canada used the after-tax LICO instead of the pre-tax LICO "to draw conclusions about [families] overall economic well-being"; Based on the nature of the studies being investigated, some researchers depend on data on pre-tax measures. Some sources of data, such as the census, contain only pre-tax income information. In research on the effects of progressive tax rates, the pre-tax income profile of groups is also useful.

According to a 2011 Canadian Review of Social Policy article, Statistics Canada calculates the LICO threshold separately based on the size of settlements. There are five sizes—"small rural settlements, urban areas with populations of fewer than 30,000, urban centres with 30,000–99,999 people, urban centres with 100,000–499,000 people, and cities with over 500,000." Poverty in Canada is most prevalent in "larger urban centres designated as census metropolitan areas (CMAs), and all of the CMAs LICOs are calculated in the last of the categories above. LICOs does not factor in the difference in the cost of living by community. In Toronto, Vancouver, and Montreal, the cost of housing is very high compared to Montreal, for example. The LICO measure of poverty may inadvertently "overestimate real poverty in a city with a lower cost of living such as Montreal, while underestimating it in cities with costs of living that are far above the average."

The Central Intelligence Agency's (CIA) The World Factbook reported that an estimated 9.4% of the Canadian population lived below the poverty line in 2008 based on the LICO measurement. They noted that countries define poverty differently, with some richer nations employing "more generous standards of poverty" than others. The Factbook said that Canada, at that time, had no official poverty line and that the LICO calculation resulted in higher calculations of poverty compared with other countries with similar economies.

=== Low Income Measure ===
The Low Income Measure (LIM), a relative measure of low income, identifies a household as low income if the household income is less than 50% of median household income. Advantages to the use LIM is the availability of LIM data going back to 1976 and the widespread use of this measure by other countries, which makes it useful for comparing low income internationally.

It is considered an especially useful measure for international comparisons, and is popular with anti-poverty groups and some foreign governments (e.g., Ireland). It results in a higher measure of poverty compared to other measures. In 2017, it was estimated to be 12.9% on an after-tax basis.

Low Income Measure, After Tax (LIM-AT)
Province	LIM-AT (2016)
Alberta	9.3%
British Columbia	15.5%
Manitoba	15.4%
New Brunswick	17.1%
Newfoundland and Labrador	15.4%
Nova Scotia	17.2%
Ontario	14.4%
Prince Edward Island	16.9%
Quebec	14.6%
Saskatchewan	12.8%
Canada	14.2%

=== Gini coefficient ===
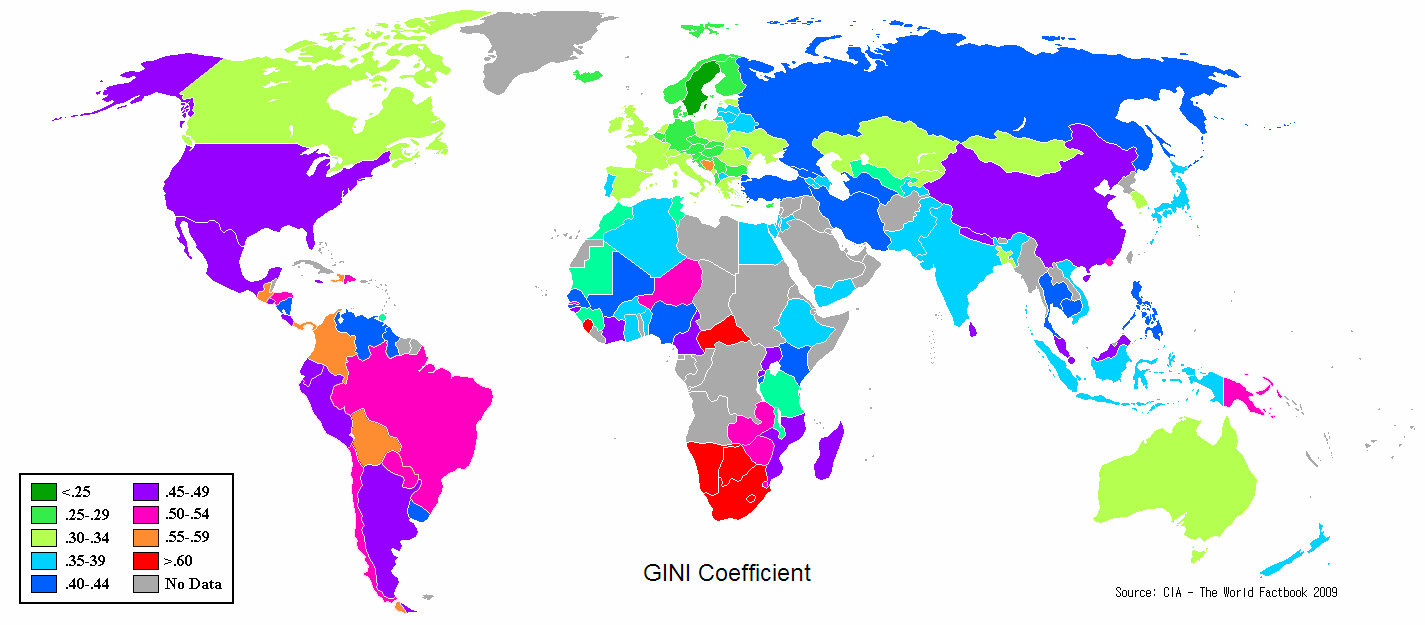
Gini coefficient, income distribution by country

The Gini coefficient is a measure of statistical dispersion most prominently used as a measure of inequality of income distribution or inequality of wealth distribution. The value 0 represents a state of perfect equality and 1 represents a state of perfect inequality.

The Gini coefficient is "an indicator of income inequality. Values of the Gini coefficient can range from 0 to 1. Smaller numbers indicate lower inequality, while higher numbers represent greater inequality."

In 2020, the 90th percentile (P90) of the adjusted after-tax income of households was 3.8 times the 10th percentile (P10). The P90/P10 ratio was 4.9 in 2010 and 3.8 in 2020.

As of 2017, the Gini coefficient for Canada was estimated to be 0.31 on an after-tax basis (basically stable since 2014).

According to the 2020 Canadian Income Survey, when the Gini coefficient decreased 0.281 in 2020 from 0.299 the previous year, this represented the "single largest absolute change since 1976." This also tied "the 1989 value for the lowest index value in 45 years".

== History of poverty in Canada ==
Prior to Confederation, English Poor Laws were only in effect in the Maritime colonies. While charities and churches took some responsibility for the poor, many people "ended up in houses of refuge, mental institutions, or prisons."

The 1940 "Report" of the Rowell–Sirois Commission described the economy of rural Canada in the 1860s, when just under half the labor force was in farming. It stated:"

The farm household in Upper Canada [Ontario] was still a basically self-sufficient unit. Food was grown and processed at home. The raw products of the farm were turned into articles of wear with the assistance of the local shoemaker and tailor who would take produce in return for their services. Such necessaries as tea, sugar, hardware and certain articles of clothing which could not be produced at home were generally obtained by barter from the local general store. Tallow was turned into candles, fatty refuse into soap, and the tools which were beyond the ingenuity of the farm workshop could generally be contrived by the local blacksmith. What was true of the Upper Canada farm was even more true of the agricultural communities in Lower Canada [Quebec] and the Maritimes, where such things as furniture, carts, and carriages were frequently made on the farm. The farm of the period was a miniature factory or combination of factories. Much of the work of the large industrial army of today, concentrated in highly specialized factories in the cities and towns was, in that early period, performed in a multitude of rural households. However prices might fall and cash income from other sources might melt away, the farm household always produced enough to prevent abject poverty. This fact had its importance for other industries as well. The farm was often a base of operations, on which individuals could fall back when other projects and occupations ended in disaster. In the Maritimes, agriculture, fishing and lumbering were closely allied. Everywhere the family and its relatives were a close economic unit; the various members helped one another when new enterprises were started or old ones failed. The material basis for this mutual welfare association was the family farm.

The British North America Act 1867 established Canada as a self-governing country and led to the creation of the 1876 Indian Act, the primary document which governs how the Canadian state interacts with the First Nations. Throughout its long history the Indian Act has been an ongoing source of controversy. The provisions of Section 91(24) of the Constitution Act, 1867, provided Canada's federal government exclusive authority to legislate in relation to "Indians and Lands Reserved for Indians". The Indian Act, its corresponding federal policies and funding mechanisms, has been blamed for the extreme poverty experienced by First Nations in Canada since its inception.

By 1900, the number of unemployed urban poor had increased, in pace with urbanization and industrialization in the late Victorian period. Faced with lack of jobs, lay-offs, and economic cycles, one in seven Canadian families were unable to survive on pooled wages. Following a brief period of modest growth in the early 1900s, World War I brought rapid inflation. Canada's first census in 1911, showed that most Canadians did not earn enough to pay for essential needs. Wages did not increase until the post-war period in the 1920s.

In the 1930s, the Great Depression caused an increase in unemployment and poverty. In October 1935, Prime Minister William Lyon Mackenzie King introduced a new era in which he sought to banish "poverty and adversity, want and misery" from Canada. His commitment to help the underprivileged was similar to that of the American President Franklin D. Roosevelt with his New Deal. Mackenzie King introduced a wide range of New Deal-like reforms, including the 1937 Federal Home Improvement Plan, which provided subsidized rates of interest, and the 1938 National Housing Act that supported low-rent housing. He also introduced compulsory contributions for pensions in 1939 and subsidies for farmers in 1940. The UK's influential Beveridge Report of 1942 and its Canadian counterpart, commissioned by Mackenzie King—the 1943 Report on Social Security for Canada by Leonard Marsh—called for the creation of a postwar welfare state, a comprehensive system of social security with full employment that would ultimately end all poverty. Both these reports reflected Keynesian economics—the major economic theory of the postwar period. The Marsh Report recommended a broad range of social assistance, social insurance and public welfare programs. In 1944, Mackenzie King introduced the Family Allowance program, which was the first universal social welfare program in Canada. In 1948, the federal government subsidized medical services in the provinces. During World War II, a small unemployment insurance program was introduced. These actions formed the foundations of Canada's "social security system or welfare state" which succeeded in "reducing the impact of poverty for many families."

In 1921, 1931, and 1941, the majority of Canadians lived in poverty, according to the annual census. In 1931, out of the families where the head was a salaried or wage worker, 43% earned less than $2,000 a year. In 1951, after eliminating the effects of price change, this percentage fell to 20%. For three decades following WWII, Canada's strong economy facilitated the introduction and expansion of social programs. By 1951, the number of people living in poverty has become a minority. By 1961, only 15% of Canadians lived in poverty.

The United States launched a "war against poverty" in 1964. In 1965, the Canadian federal government undertook a study to examine greater federal-provincial co-operation to combat poverty.

In 1966, the Canada Pension Plan and Quebec Pension Plan came into effect. The 1967 Guaranteed Income Supplement assisted seniors and near-seniors who would not be able to benefit fully from the other government pension plans. The 1968 Economic Council of Canada (ECC) report said that 27% of Canadians lived in poverty. A Senate inquiry estimated that as many as 1 in 4 Canadians were living in poverty in 1969.

After World War II, with more Canadians were living in urban areas, and by 1967, low income had increasingly become an urban problem.

In response to the ECC report, a Special Senate Committee on Poverty Poverty in Canada, was commissioned—chaired by David Croll—that undertook "cross-country hearings and investigations". The Committee tabled their benchmark report "Poverty in Canada" which "brought poverty out of the shadows." The Croll report "reiterated much of what had been revealed in the ECC's report and proposed a guaranteed annual income program to eliminate poverty in Canada".

By the end of the 1960s, Statistics Canada estimated that the number of Canadians living in poverty had fallen from about 25% of the population in 1961 to about 20.8% in 1969. In addition, the percentage of families living in poverty fell to 13.9% by 1982. According to one estimate, the percentage of Canadian families living in poverty fell steadily during he 1970s; from 17.7% in 1969 to 9.8% in 1979. According to another estimate, the percentage of people living below the poverty line stood at 19.5% in 1968, and fell to below 10% in 1978.

Against the backdrop of the early 1980s recession, which affected much of the developed world in the late 1970s and early 1980s, and left Canada with weaker economic growth and inflation, Prime Minister Pierre Elliot Trudeau introduced a series of unpopular budgets. His Finance Minister Allan MacEachen said that the global oil price shocks—in 1973 and again in 1979—had caused a "sharp renewal of inflationary forces and real income losses" in Canada and in the industrial world...They are not just Canadian problems ... they are world-wide problems." Concerns about the recession, were raised by world leaders at the Venice Summit, at meetings of Finance Ministers of the International Monetary Fund (IMF) and the Organisation for Economic Co-operation and Development (OECD), Leaders of developed countries raised their concerns at the Venice Summit, at meetings of Finance Ministers of the IMF and the OECD. The Bank of Canada described Canadians experiencing a "deeply troubling air of uncertainty and anxiety" about the economy. In his last term in office, Trudeau expanded government support for Canada's poorest citizens.

In Western countries, unemployment increased from the mid-1970s to mid-1980s, partly because of two oil shocks that caused the price of oil to rise, a decline in birthrates, increased competition from Asia and Latin America—whose economies were emerging, and the automation of jobs. As corporations saw a loss of profits with a militant labour movement winning wage settlements, Canada followed in the steps of the US, and introduced statutory wage and price controls in 1975. The political success of Margaret Thatcher in Britain in 1979, Ronald Reagan in the United States in 1980, Helmut Kohl in Germany in 1983, and Brian Mulroney in Canada 1984, indicated a shift away from the welfare state. According to a 1989 article in the journal, Capital and Class, Prime Minister Mulroney implemented neoliberal policies by decreasing the state's involvement in the monetary sector and loosening restrictions on trade with the United States and overseas. He introduced legislation to balance the budget. He worked towards limiting government involvement in the economy and related institutions. The neoliberal policies introduced by Mulroney were moderate and less radical compared to those introduced by the President Reagan.

The National Council of Welfare's 186-page January 1984 report "Poverty and Public Policy" prepared by Ken Battle, the council's director and founder of Caledon Institute of Social Policy, and submitted to the Macdonald Commission, was considered to be one of the most complete reports on poverty in Canada at that time.

Since the late 1980s, in Canada and many industrial nations, there was a rise in poverty.

In 1997, Canada did not have an official poverty measurement.

In 2003, the United Nations Committee on Economic, Social and Cultural Rights called on Canada to "expand protection in human rights legislation ... to protect poor people ... from discrimination because of social or economic status" The report noted the "persistence of poverty" in Canada, particularly for vulnerable groups.

By 2008, Senator Eggleton tabled the Senate Committees's report on "Poverty, Housing And Homelessness: Issues And Options", saying that the phenomena and the understanding of poverty, housing and homelessness had become more complex since 1971, when the Croll report was tabled. Poverty, housing and homelessness continued to be "as grave a challenge" in 2008 as in 1971. The poverty rate in Canada in 2008, was among the highest of the OECD member nations, the world's wealthiest industrialized nations.

In 2013, Canada's high poverty rate ranked among the worst of 17 high income countries with 12.1% living in poverty. Canada's child poverty rate was 15.1% compared to 12.8% in the mid-1990s. Only the United States ranked lower.

An April 29, 2014 Administrators Colloquium organized by the Canada School of Public Service noted that there was a shift in research from poverty in Canada to examinations of income inequality, for example in the Standing Committee on Finance's December 2013 report. This shift was also reflected at the international level in research and publications by the IMF, the OECD, and the World Economic Forum (WEF). By 2014, the WEF described the increasing wealth gap as the "biggest risk facing the world".

By 2017, the number of people living below the official poverty line had decreased substantially to 9.5%. In a March 2019 the OECD reported that Canada's "relative poverty" rate (using the LIM definition) of 12.4%, was "slightly above" the average for OECD member countries, which is 11.7%. the relative poverty rate for children and youth in Canada was higher than the OECD average. According to the 2019 report, the elderly had the "lowest poverty rate amongst all age-groups in Canada." The relative poverty rates for the elderly population was lower than average compared to other OECD countries.

== Child poverty in Canada ==
On November 24, 1989, all Canadian Parliamentarians had unanimously voted to eliminate child poverty by the year 2000, in response to the final speech before his retirement, made by Ed Broadbent, then leader of the NDP. Broadbent had called for a resolution raising concern "for the more than one million Canadian children living in poverty." By 2000, Denmark, Sweden, Norway, and Finland had almost abolished child poverty. By 2013, the rate child poverty in Canada was higher than it was in 1989, and was approaching the poverty rates of the mid-1970s in spite of the growth of Canada's economy between 1981 and 2010.

In 1991, Canada ratified The United Nations Convention on the Rights of the Child (UNCRC). Since then, Campaign 2000 has been producing its annual "Report Card on Child Poverty in Canada".

In 1998 the Canada Child Tax Benefit (CCTB) and the National Child Benefit Supplement (NCB-S) were introduced. As a result of this support, the enhanced child care support, and an increase in employment, low‑income rates for single‑parent households began to decrease.

The 2004 Campaign2000 said that "[c]ontrary to popular belief", most households with child poverty includes the "working poor", whose parents work in jobs that do not provide "adequate pay, sufficient hours or benefits".

In the period following the Great Depression, from 2007 to 2014—in contrast with other OECD nations—the standard of living of children in poor single-parent households declined while for those in poor two-family households, it improved. In the latter, both market income and disposable income increased. (Note: Market income refers to the "sum of: wages and salaries, net self-employment net income, interest and investment income, private pension and registered retirement savings plan income, and includes alimony or support income received...Disposable income refers to the total income remaining after payment of "income tax, employment insurance contributions, public and private pension plan contributions, childcare expenses incurred in order to hold a paid job, alimony or support payments paid, and public health insurance premiums (Thévenon 2018:17).")

The "Census in Brief" report said that in 2015, 38.9% children in a lone‑parent family lived in a household with an income below the LICO threshold. Of these, 42% of children in single-parent homes with their mothers lived in low-income homes compared to 25.5% of children who lived with their fathers.

In July 2016, the federal government introduced the Canada Child Benefit (CCB), which was a "significant investment" towards reducing child poverty. An OECD working paper said that it was anticipated that the CCB would "lift 300,000 children out of poverty."

The federal rural riding of Churchill—Keewatinook Aski in Manitoba—which is home to many First Nations—had the highest child poverty rate in Canada in 2015 with about 64.2% living in poverty, according to the a Campaign2000 2018 riding-by-riding analysis.

In 2020, 4.7% of children under 18 were living in poverty, which was a large decrease from the 9.7% child poverty rate in 2019. According to a March 24, 2022 Bloomberg News article on Statistics Canada Canadian Income Survey, 2020 released on March 23, by data reporter Erik Hertzberg, in 2020, the number of Canadians under 18 who live in poverty fell by more than half to 324,000." Citing Statistics Canada, Hertzberg said that the "number of Canadian children in poverty" fell 71% since 2015; that the "number of children and teenagers living below the poverty line" fell by 780,000 and the "proportion living in poverty...dropped to 4.7%, one of the lowest rates on record". Children in lone-parent families remain more vulnerable to poverty. In 2020, the child poverty rate was 3% for those living in couple families, compared with 16.9% for those in female lone-parent families. In 2020, 3.1% of seniors aged 65 years and older were living below the poverty line.

According to a March 24, 2022 Bloomberg News article on the "Canadian Income Survey, 2020" released on March 23, by data reporter Erik Hertzberg, in 2020, the number of Canadians under 18 who live in poverty fell by more than half to 324,000." Citing Statistics Canada, Hertzberg said that the "number of Canadian children in poverty" fell 71% since 2015; that the "number of children and teenagers living below the poverty line" fell by 780,000 and the "proportion living in poverty...dropped to 4.7%, one of the lowest rates on record".

=== Indigenous child poverty in Canada ===
According to the Canadian Centre for Policy Alternatives (CCPA), "Based on data from the 2006 census, this study found that the average child poverty rate for all children in Canada in 2013 was 17%, while the average child poverty rate for all Indigenous children was more than twice that figure, at 40%." "50% — of status First Nations children live below the poverty line. This number grows to 62% in Manitoba and 64% in Saskatchewan." The 2013 study referred to used the Low Income Measure as their definition for poverty, which always shows a high rate. Nonetheless, the much higher LIM statistics for indigenous families indicate a much higher level of poverty among that demographic.

Canada has received international recognition for its social welfare system, but this image of Canada does not reflect the reality for many Indigenous children. Canada has been able to avoid criticism for its childhood poverty rate as statistics often do not include the rates of poverty within Indigenous reserves and the three territories in Canada. Once the data on childhood poverty in these areas is included, the statistics suggest that the number of children living in deprivation rises to around 18%. This percentage of childhood impoverishment seems to imply that Canada's allocation of funding designed to assist Indigenous children is failing to match the severity of the problem.

According to the 2013 report, all levels of government were not completing their role in assisting Indigenous children. Educational institutions that are located on reserves often do not get the resources they need which affects the quality of education these children receive. This includes projects that aim to help give Indigenous children a chance to continue with their studies after completing high school. The reality of these initiatives is that they do not have the necessary resources to help majority of applicants as the ratio of applicants far outweighs the funding that they receive.

As of 2013, Indigenous children faced many other obstacles due to the lack of assistance and resources from the government. There are reserves where residents are still fighting for access to safe drinking water. Further, such children are likely to reside in shelters that do not have enough room to adequately occupy all the residents. In addition, often children residing on reserves are living within houses that are in substandard condition and thus, needing urgent renovations.

With the publication of their third installment in Upstream Institute's series, completed on June 24, 2019, by researchers at the Assembly of First Nations and the CCPA, the authors met with provincial premiers to report that nearly 50% of Indigenous children live in poverty.

== Groups with high levels of poverty ==
In their first report submitted to the Employment and Social Development Canada (ESDC) in February 2021, the National Advisory Council on Poverty identified groups within Canada that experience "disproportionately high levels of poverty". These at risk groups include members of First Nations who live on reserves, unattached individuals, those with disabilities, children, recent immigrants, and persons in sole-caregiver families. The Council stressed that women and anyone who belongs to more than one of these risk groups experienced more profound impacts of poverty. Of the 10% of women in Canada who are living on low incomes, many are more vulnerable to poverty because they are racialized, have disabilities, and/or are single parents.

=== Indigenous people ===
In his 2011 statement published on the United Nations site, James Anaya, the UN special rapporteur on indigenous peoples, said that "aboriginal communities face higher rates of poverty, and poorer health, education and employment outcomes than non-aboriginals in Canada. He cited in particular how many residents in the Attawapiskat First Nation community of 2,000 in the Kenora "live in unheated shacks or trailers that lack running water" and electricity in "Third World conditions." In 2013, the community experienced flooding and sewage backups caused by substandard infrastructure. By 2016, faced with an extreme housing shortage, sixteen people were forced to share a three-bedroom house. A teenager in that household was one of 116 people who attempted suicide in a six-month period in a suicide crisis that made international headlines.

In the 2018 report, "Opportunity for All" report, the federal government acknowledged that "poverty in Indigenous communities is an outcome of colonialization and government policies", and that poverty rates among Indigenous people is very high when compared to the general population.

=== People with disabilities ===
In 2014, 41% of the low‑income population in Canada consisted of people who had a disability. The low-income rate for people with disabilities in Canada was between 23% and 24% in 2014. Those with a mental–cognitive disability were more likely to experience low income than those with a physical–sensory disability.

=== Recent immigrants ===
New immigrants are more likely to face the adversity that comes with poverty for numerous reasons. Many find this fact unsettling as Canada has built their economic structure around the work performed by immigrants and as a result, is a leading destination for individuals wanting to leave their country. In addition, research suggests that recent immigrants are more disadvantaged compared to individuals who have immigrated in the past. There are many factors that contribute to this, but there is a strong emphasis on the fact that new immigrants often face an economic market that can only provide them with poorly paid occupations.

Many believe that even well-rounded immigrants are not immune to the impoverished living conditions that many newcomers face. It is recognized that immigrants who have worked for an education in their previous country of residence often face obstacles in getting their education accounted for in Canada. To build on this, individuals who immigrate to Canada tend to hold higher levels of education as compared to individuals who were born in Canada. This inevitably puts them in a disadvantaged position as they are competing for jobs against others who often have their educational achievements recognized by employers. It is evident that the problem is not necessarily that immigrants are under qualified, but that their qualifications often go unrecognized by employers.

As a result of these factors, immigrants tend to reside in parts of cities that are inhabited by individuals who are employed in low income positions. Residents of such areas are often left to confront problems such as unreliable transit systems and substandard living conditions. These areas often have fewer services available to individuals, that often puts new immigrants in a more difficult position. Further, this system of settlement often leads to segregated living conditions based on ethnicity.

As of 2011, Montreal, Toronto, and Vancouver were the three major gateway cities where the "vast majority of immigrants" settled and where they "experience greater threats of poverty". Even immigrants who arrive in Canada with "strong human capital assets" have to face a "more challenging labour market and economic environment" than those who arrived in the 1990s. This newer cohort became "far more vulnerable to low income and poverty" over longer periods of time. According to a 2000 article in the Journal of International Migration and Integration, using data from the 1996 census, immigrants in Canada are more likely to live in high-poverty neighbourhoods, than non-immigrants. Immigrants in these extremely poor neighbourhoods experience social isolation, as well as other social ills associated with high-poverty neighbourhoods—"poor educational and health care services, high crime, and high unemployment rates". From 1918 to 2001, "spatial concentration of family poverty in the City of Toronto" had increased.

=== Single parents ===
Poverty among single parent households decreased in the late 1990s and 2000s. In the 2010s the poverty rate in lone parent families remained the same and by 2016, it was over twice the Canadian average poverty rate, with about 30% of lone-parent households in poverty compared to an average of 11% for the general Canadian population. Single parent households represent 40% of child poverty in Canada.

=== Non-elderly unattached individuals ===
A 2007 Statistics Canada report said that by 2005, the number of unattached individuals aged 45–64 that were living in low income had doubled from 1980 to 1.18 million. In 2005, this group represented only 11% of the Canadian population but represented 34% of Canadians living on a low income.

== Working poor ==
From 2007 through 2014, between 3% and 4% of Canadians are considered to be in a household where the main income earner is working poor. Working poor is defined as someone who works more than 910 hours a year and whose income is below the LICO threshold.

== Poverty beyond income ==
The October 2016 ESDC backgrounder on poverty included factors, such as adequate house, food security, access to health services, and crime, to provide a more complete description of how poverty affects the everyday lives of Canadians.

=== Housing ===
Anti-poverty strategies and programs designed in response to the crisis of homelessness in Canada have been included in housing policies and strategies at the federal, provincial, and municipal levels. Activists said that the efforts were insufficient, inefficient, or unsustainable. Housing is just one of a number of social determinants of health (SDH), along with poverty, employment, income, education, social support networks, physical environments, early child development, gender and social capital, that prevent Indigenous peoples in Canada from achieving health equity with other Canadians. According to a 2015 meta-analysis by a team of University of Alberta and Memorial University researchers, sources in their systematic review indicated that Indigenous peoples in Alberta were more likely to have a "limited affordability for dwellings" and to "live in dwellings with inappropriate housing conditions and private spaces." As of 2016, First Nations, Inuit and Metis households lived in "inadequate and insufficient" housing; this was recognized as a critical problem across Canada.

Lower income households tend to rent rather than own their own homes. From 2007 to 2014, there was a sharp increase to 50% from 30% of children in households with two parents living in rented homes rather than homes they own. During the same period there was a decrease in the number of children living in "poor homeowner families" from 52.6% in 2007 to 45.5% in 2014, despite low-mortgage rates. In this post Great Recession period there was a sharp increase in the price of homes, and an increase in rent, and a lower rate of rental vacancy. While children, whose parents own their own home, experienced a 13% gain in income during that period, for the families of renters, the standard of living declined.

== Comparative poverty by geography ==
As of 2019, Canada with a poverty rate of 11.8%, ranked 19th out of 38 OECD countries with Costa Rica at the highest rate of poverty (19.9%), and Iceland with a poverty rate of 4.9% at the lowest.

Poverty rates in Canada differ in provinces and territories, federal electoral districts, and rural and urban settings. In a 2013 Government of Canada discussion paper on rural poverty, the authors described how rural residents had lower incomes and levels of education and literacy, less access to health services and adequate employment when compared to residents in urban areas. They describe how living in a rural area increases the risk and level of poverty in groups that are already more at risks to having low incomes—Indigenous people, women, sole-parent households, the elderly, and people with disabilities. Research undertaken in the mid-1990s revealed that there was a "strong association between race and minority status, and living in neighbourhoods of concentrated poverty in Canada."

The two rural federal ridings with the highest rates of child poverty in 2015—Churchill—Keewatinook Aski in Manitoba and Desnethé—Missinippi—Churchill River in northern Saskatchewan—both encompass vast land masses in the northern part of these provinces covering from one third to four-fifths of the provinces. In terms of demographics they include some of the highest percentage of indigenous persons, including First Nations and Métis. Nunavut, with it majority population of Inuit, is included in the top ten riding with the highest child poverty rates. Urban ridings on the list of electoral districts with high child poverty rates include Winnipeg Centre, Toronto Centre, Ottawa—Vanier and Ottawa South in Ontario.

=== Provinces and territories ===
Poverty in the Canadian provinces (2018). Conference Board of Canada >14 13–13.9 12–12.9 11–11.9 <10 No data

In 2015, these federal ridings had the highest child poverty rates in Canada: Churchill—Keewatinook Aski in Manitoba, Desnethé—Missinippi—Churchill River in Saskatchewan, Winnipeg Centre in Manitoba; Toronto Centre in Ontario, Ville-Marie—Le Sud-Ouest—Île-des-Sœurs in Quebec, Nunavut, Kenora in Ontario, Hamilton Centre in Ontario, Dauphin—Swan River—Neepawa in Manitoba, Sydney—Victoria in Nova Scotia, Humber River—Black Creek in Ontario, Bourassa in Quebec, Scarborough-Guildwood in Ontario, Winnipeg North in Manitoba, Windsor West in Ontario, Saint-Léonard—Saint-Michel in Quebec, Edmonton Griesbach in Alberta, Ottawa—Vanier Ontario, Etobicoke North in Ontario, Battlefords—Lloydminster in Saskatchewan, Regina—Qu'Appelle in Saskatchewan, York South—Weston in Ontario, Scarborough Centre in Ontario, Saskatoon West in Saskatchewan, Scarborough Southwest in Ontario, Scarborough—Agincourt in Ontario, Papineau in Quebec, Don Valley East in Ontario, Ottawa South in Ontario and Prince Albert in Saskatchewan.

The rural federal riding of Churchill—Keewatinook Aski in Manitoba, which had the highest rate of child poverty in Canada in 2015 (64.2%) encompasses the northern four fifths of the province and includes a vast wilderness area, First Nations reserves, and small communities. It has the highest percentage of First Nations people (61.1%) in Canada, The federal rural riding of Desnethé—Missinippi—Churchill River in northern Saskatchewan, covers the northern half of the province and is the third largest federal riding in Canada. In 2015, there were 15,300 children living in poverty (57.8%). Its population is 70.6% Aboriginal according to the 2011 Census. It is the riding with the highest percentage of Métis people.

From 2015 through 2019, the poverty rate in all the provinces decreased, according to the 2019 Canadian Income Survey. By 2019, Alberta had the lowest poverty rate—8.2% and Saskatchewan had the highest—12.4%. The poverty rate in New Brunswick decreased by 41.6% and in British Columbia by 39.3%. Quebec's poverty rates was already less than the national average.

Statistics Canada and ESDC are working in collaboration with Nunavut to develop a MBM-N which will take into consideration the "unique living conditions" experienced there. They are also working on a Northern Market Basket Measure of poverty that will more accurately describe poverty in the Yukon and Northwest Territories.

According to a 2011 Canadian Review of Social Policy article, British Columbia had the most prevalent rates of impoverishment and childhood poverty within Canada. The authors said that policies implemented by both federal and provincial governments had resulted in benefits to only the upper-income earners. The authors said that province's NDP government in the late 1990s and Liberal Party since 2001, had kept the minimum wage low while also limiting social assistance. Poverty was the result of low wages not high unemployment. Many British Columbians are working but their wages do not prevent them from living in impoverished conditions. Increases in the cost of housing and food created more challenges for low income earners. In 2011, British Columbia was the only province in Canada that had no poverty reduction measures. By 2011, the quality of life for the poor was on the decline, while wealthy residents benefitted from policies implemented by the previous Liberal government.

== Federal role in poverty reduction ==
Canada's first official poverty reduction strategy was announced in the 2018 report "Opportunities for All".

=== Reduced tax burden ===
The Canadian income tax system is highly progressive. This can be seen by comparing the 2005 pre-tax low-income cut-off rate of 15.3% with the after-tax rate of only 10.8%. It is also evident in the Gini coefficient, which was estimated to be 0.428 on a pre-tax basis but only 0.315 on an after-tax basis. The Conference Board of Canada 2013 study noted the Canadian system provides relief to the poor which contributes to lowering poverty rates in Canada. Their 2013 report stated that without Canada's tax system and transfers, the poverty rate would have been 23% not the current 12%.

=== Social programs ===
The Conference Board of Canada 2013 study noted "that due to the tax system and transfers to the poor, income inequality is 27% lower than it otherwise would be." Canada has a wide range of government transfers to persons, which totaled $176.6 billion in 2009. Some of the transfers designed to assist low-income people in Canada include Welfare and Old age security. There is also an extensive mandatory Employment Insurance program designed to assist workers who have become unemployed to lessen the chance of them falling into poverty.

In addition to government transfers, there are number of other publicly funded services and social programs that benefit those with low-incomes like Medicare, Public education for grade school; subsidized post-secondary education, Subsidized housing, and Employment equity programs, which often target various groups of people who are deemed to be susceptible to having low-incomes.

=== Working income tax benefit ===
The WITB was introduced in 2007 to encourage low income people to enter the labour force, and to provide them with increased financial support. The WITB has been expanded considerably since its introduction. As of 2012, it is worth up to $970 for a single individual, $1762 for couples and single parent families. A person or couple must have at least $3,000 in employment income, and not be a student, to be eligible for WITB. Benefits increase, and then decrease, with income, and are completely clawed back at an income of $11,011 for singles, $15,205 for couples or single parents (in 2012).These credits are not taxed (see Income taxes in Canada#Income not taxed).

=== Child credits ===
Low-income Canadians are eligible for the Canada Child Tax Benefit (a federal benefit), and provincial child tax credits or benefits and Québec family allowances. For example, Ontario pays a benefit scheduled to grow to $180 per month by 2011 for a family earnings less than $20,000 with two children. These credits are not taxed (see Income taxes in Canada#Income not taxed).

=== Minimum wage laws ===
Under the Constitution of Canada, the responsibility for enacting and enforcing labour laws including minimum wages in Canada rests with the ten provinces, the three territories also having been granted this power by virtue of federal legislation. This means that each province and territory has its own minimum wage. The lowest general minimum wage currently in force is that of the Alberta ($15.00/hour), the highest is that of Nunavut ($19.75/hour). Some provinces allow lower wages to be paid to liquor servers and other tip earners, and/or to inexperienced employees.

== Provincial and territorial role in poverty reduction ==
Several Canadian provinces are introducing poverty reduction strategies, following the examples set by the European Union, Ireland and the United Kingdom. Newfoundland & Labrador, Nova Scotia, Quebec, Ontario and Manitoba are all developing provincial strategies. Quebec and Manitoba have enshrined their efforts in legislation. Newfoundland & Labrador has established a provincial ministry. Ontario has set a cabinet roundtable to address child poverty, as per the Liberals's campaign promise. Because of these moves, each province is exploring the development of a measurement tool to track any progress made on reducing poverty, such as the use of a Deprivation Index.

== Municipal role in poverty reduction ==
In their 2017 submission to consultations on the development of a national Canadian poverty reduction strategy, the Federation of Canadian Municipalities (FCM)—which includes 2,000 municipalities in its membership—called on the federal government, provinces, territories, and municipalities along with community groups and businesses—to develop solutions that are anchored locally.

== See also ==
- List of countries by percentage of population living in poverty
- Basic income in Canada
- Campaign 2000
- Child poverty in Canada
- Homelessness in Canada
- Poverty by country
- Poverty in Ontario
- Poverty in the United Kingdom
  - History of poverty in the United Kingdom
- Poverty in the United States
  - History of poverty in the United States
- Social history of Canada
- Laurentian elite, the Upper Class in Canada
