= Campaign 2000 =

Campaign 2000 is a movement to eliminate poverty in Canada. Founded in 1991, it has been influential in the law because of its concern with government and public discussions towards the issue of poverty amongst families and children and the government policy. Furthermore, they have lobbied all parties in federal and provincial parties to enhance social policies, which relate to child care, labour market supports, social housing, community services, and the national child benefit, as well as other significant policy regions.

== See also ==
- Poverty in Canada

== Notes ==
- Briefs on the Campaign
