= COVID-19 pandemic in Brazil =

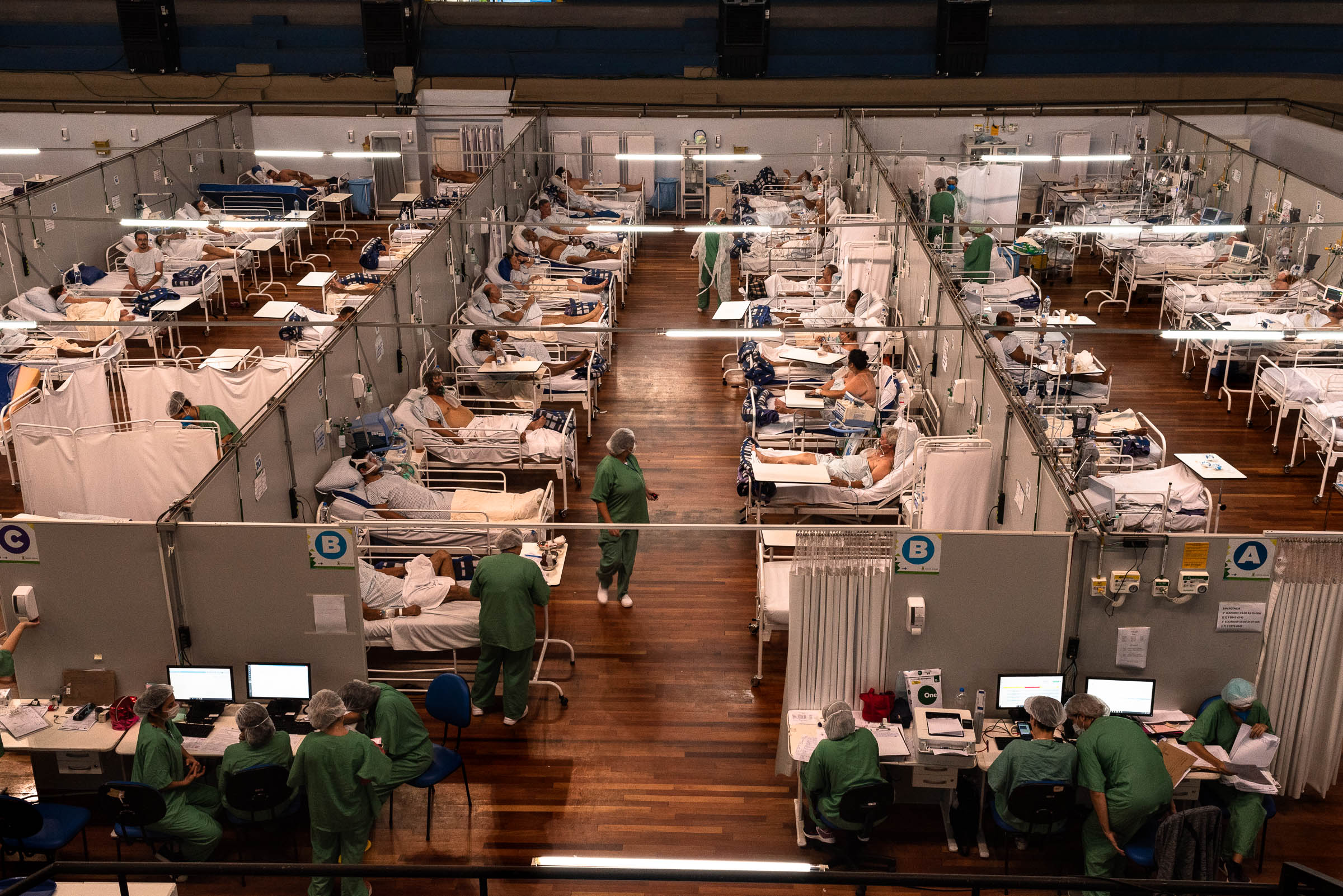
- A temporary hospital for COVID patients in Santo André, São Paulo
- Disease: COVID-19
- Pathogen: SARS-CoV-2
- Location: Brazil
- First outbreak: Wuhan, Hubei, China
- Arrival date: 26 February 2020 (6 years, 7 months, 1 week and 1 day)
- Confirmed cases: 38,050,567
- Recovered: 37,076,425 (updated 30 Sep 2023)
- Deaths: 704,066
- Fatality rate: 1.85%

Government website
- covid.saude.gov.br

The COVID-19 pandemic in Brazil has resulted in 38,050,567 confirmed cases of COVID-19 and 704,066 deaths. The virus was confirmed to have spread to Brazil on 25 February 2020, when a man from São Paulo who had traveled to Italy tested positive for the virus. The disease had spread to every federative unit of Brazil by 21 March. On 19 June 2020, the country reported its one millionth case and nearly 49,000 reported deaths. One estimate of under-reporting was 22.62% of total reported COVID-19 mortality in 2020.

The COVID-19 pandemic triggered a variety of responses from federal, state and local governments, having an impact on politics, education, the environment, and the economy. On 27 March 2020 Brazil announced a temporary ban on foreign air travelers and most state governors have imposed quarantines to prevent the spread of the virus. President Jair Bolsonaro perpetuated conspiracy theories surrounding COVID-19 treatments and its origins, and was accused of downplaying effective mitigations and pursuing a strategy of herd immunity. In October 2021, a congressional panel recommended criminal charges against the president for his handling of the pandemic, including crimes against humanity.

As of 18 September 2026, Brazil, with 38,050,567 confirmed cases and 704,066 deaths, has the third-highest number of confirmed cases and second-highest death toll from COVID-19 in the world, behind only those of the United States and of India.

== Timeline ==
=== 2019 ===
==== November ====
- 27 November: Two raw sewage samples collected independently on 27 November 2019 in Santa Catarina, Brazil, will later detect SARS-CoV-2 (100,000 copies per litre), 66 days in advance of the first COVID-19 confirmed case in the Americas. Subsequent samplings are positive on 11 December 2019 and 20 February 2020. These samples can show that SARS-CoV-2 was circulating in Brazil at least as early as late November 2019. However, this is highly contested by the scientific consensus which shows that the virus emerged in early December 2019 in Wuhan, China. Thus, it is highly unlikely that it was circulating in Brazil before early 2020. Researchers from the Institute of Tropical Medicine and international colleagues showed in the scientific journal Science that the first sustained transmission of SARS-CoV-2 in Brazil occurred between late February and early March 2020.

=== 2020 ===
On 28 January 2020, Brazil's Ministry of Health announced that a suspected case of COVID-19 was being investigated in Belo Horizonte, involving a student who had recently returned from Wuhan, China. Ministry also announced that they was investigating two other suspected cases in Porto Alegre and Curitiba.

On 3 February, it was announced that the Brazilian government would assist in helping citizens in Wuhan return to the country; on 5 February, two planes were sent to Wuhan to repatriate 34 citizens. The citizens and all other crew were to be quarantined and monitored for 18 days at a Brazilian Air Force base in Anápolis. They were released ahead of schedule on 23 February, after repeatedly testing negative.

On 25 February, the first confirmed COVID-19 case in Brazil (and the first in South America) was announced by the Health Department of São Paulo – a 61-year-old man who had returned from Lombardy, Italy. A second case was confirmed soon after in another person who had recently returned from Italy. On 28 February, scientists of the University of São Paulo's Tropical Medicine Institute and the Adolfo Lutz Institute reported that they had sequenced the genomes of these two cases, which had been separately introduced from Northern Italy to Brazil on two occasions. In an address on 6 March, President Jair Bolsonaro advised residents to "strictly follow the experts' recommendations as the best protective measure", but that "there is no reason to panic".

On 12 March, it was reported that Bolsonaro's press secretary Fábio Wajngarten had tested positive for COVID-19, prompting increased monitoring of Bolsonaro (who tested negative the next day) and his cabinet. Wajngarten had also interacted with U.S. President Donald Trump and Vice President Mike Pence during Bolsonaro's visit to Miami, Florida on 7 March. The number of cases within the cabinet began to increase, including Minister of Mines and Energy Bento Albuquerque, and President of the Federal Senate Davi Alcolumbre; by 20 March, Brazil had the second-largest number of cases among members of a federal cabinet, overtaking Iran and behind only France.

On 13 March, the cruise ship Silver Shadow arrived from the Bahamas and docked in Recife, Pernambuco, bearing 318 passengers and 291 crew members, including one suspected case of COVID-19. The ship was isolated by health authorities. On 17 March, Brazil recorded its first death. At this time, there were 291 confirmed cases in the country. By 20 March, state health departments reported almost 1,000 confirmed cases across 23 of 26 states and also in the Federal District. By 21 March, all Brazilian states had reported at least one confirmed case of COVID-19, with the most recent being Roraima. In the month since Brazil's first confirmed case, Brazil had 2,915 confirmed cases and 77 deaths.

On 28 March, the Ministry of Health reported that Brazil had 3,904 confirmed cases and 114 deaths, suggesting a mortality rate of 2.9%. Approximately 90% of deaths were people over 60 years of age, and most were men. In 84% of deaths, patients had at least one risk factor, most commonly heart disease, followed by diabetes and pneumopathy.

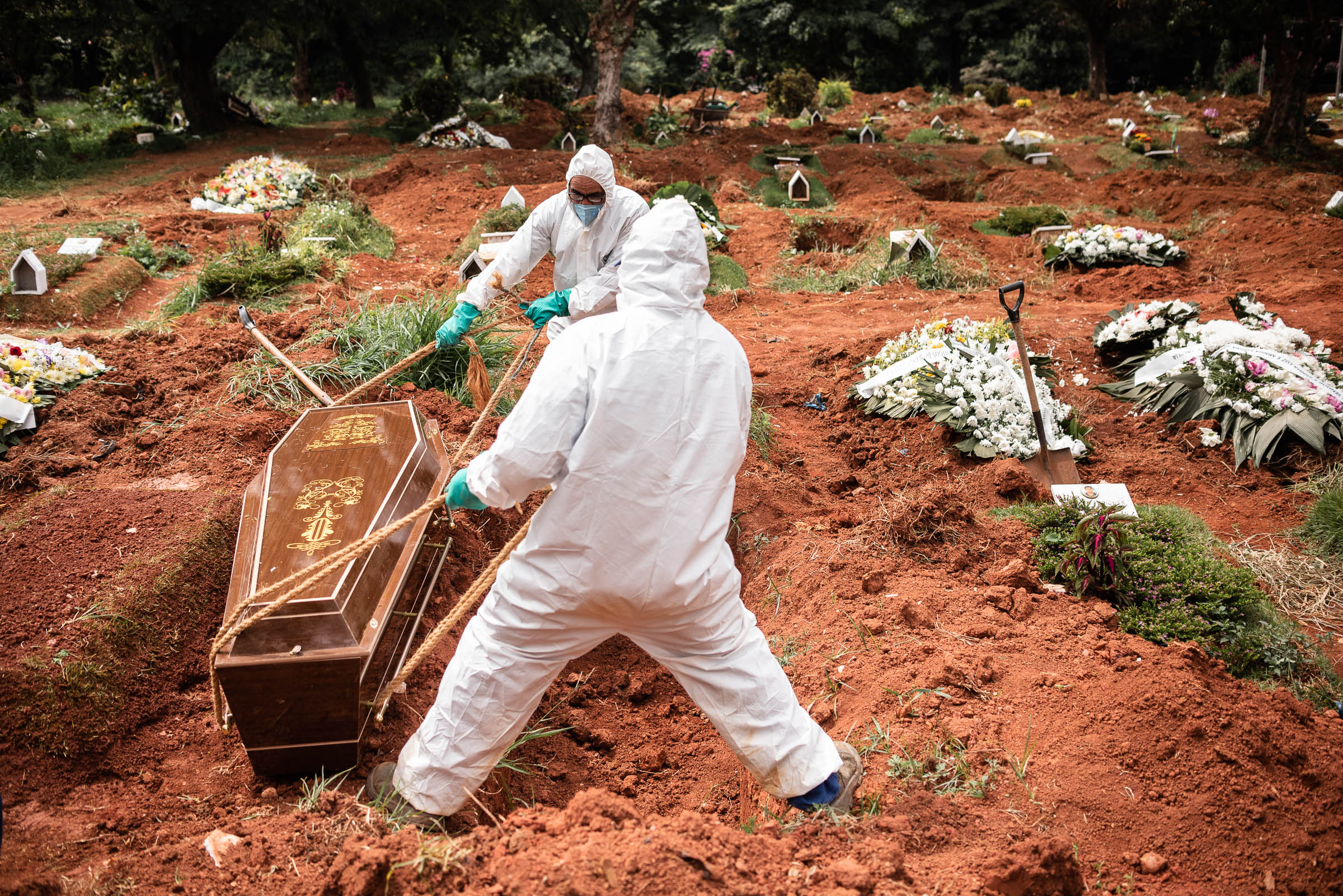
Gravediggers wearing protection against contamination bury the body of a man suspected of having died of COVID-19 in the cemetery of Vila Alpina, east side of São Paulo, in April 2020.

==== April ====
Number of cases (blue) and number of deaths (red) on a logarithmic scale

- 6 April: President Jair Bolsonaro threatened to fire the Minister of Health, Luiz Henrique Mandetta, after they clashed. Following criticism, Bolsonaro temporarily backed down.
- 9 April: The federal government sent out its first financial assistance (Portuguese: Auxílio emergencial) to the public. Over 2.5 million people received R$600 ($116).
- 10 April: Brazil confirmed the thousandth coronavirus-related death, as the number of confirmed cases neared 20,000.

The virus had reached remote locations; a Yanomami teen died of it in Roraima.

- 14 April: The Ministry of Health reported a total of 25,262 confirmed cases and 1,532 confirmed deaths. Over 14,000 people were declared recovered, although they were not confirmed virus-free, only discharged from a hospital or asymptomatic.
- 16 April: President Bolsonaro fired the Minister of Health, Luiz Henrique Mandetta, over disagreements about social distancing guidelines. He said he would appoint a health minister who favored reopening businesses "as quickly as possible". Shortly afterwards, Nelson Teich was appointed to replace him.
- 20 April: Several cities started to ease social isolation guidelines in favor of contact tracing. Some retail stores were allowed to open as long as customers wore masks, the number of in-person customers was reduced, and customer personal information was tracked.
- 24 April: Brazil confirmed more than fifty thousand cases.
- 30 April: Brazil overtook China's official number of confirmed cases, surpassing 87,000

==== May ====
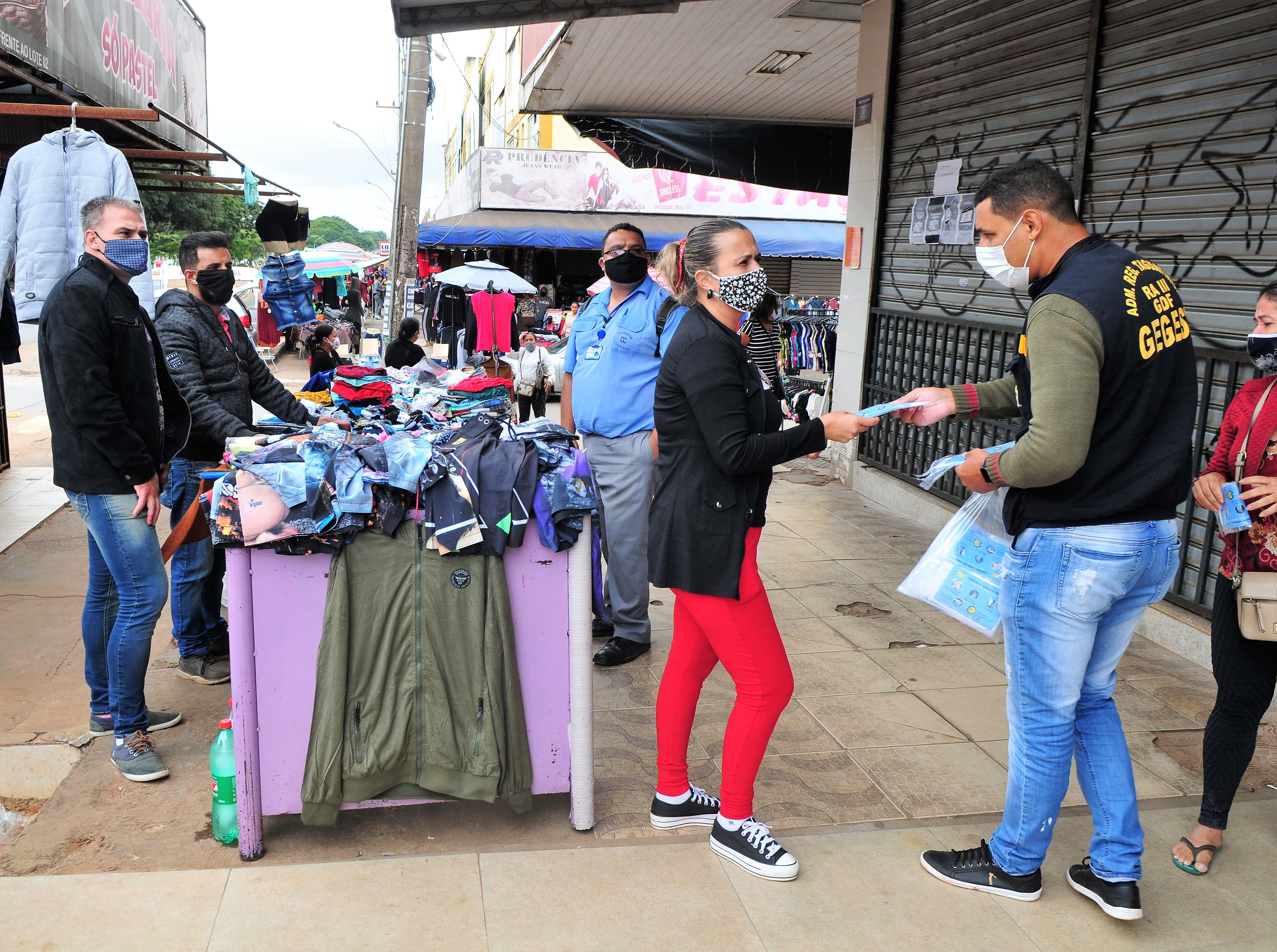
Distribution of face masks in Brasília

- 3 May: Brazil confirmed more than a hundred thousand cases; the number of cases had doubled in less than 10 days.
- 7 May: Several cities in the northern states of Amazonas and Pará begun issuing lockdown measures in order to curb the spread of the virus. Other cities in other states consider doing the same.
- 9 May: Brazil confirmed more than ten thousand deaths; the number of deaths had doubled in less than two weeks.
- c. 11 May: Brazilian care centers initiate use of the hug tunnel to allow elderly people to safely be in proximity to loved ones.
- 14 May: Brazil confirmed more than 200,000 cases; the number of cases had doubled in 11 days.

The state of Ceará became the state with the second most confirmed cases, overtaking Rio de Janeiro.

- 15 May: Brazil's minister of Health, Nelson Teich, resigned less than a month after being nominated. He cited reasons for this action similar to those of his predecessor: his clashes with the president over the use of hydroxychloroquine, the social distancing guidelines, and being overruled on rules he was supposed to define. General Eduardo Pazuello assumed the role of Interim Minister of Health, until an official replacement could be found.
- 26 May: Reuters reported that according to four officials, the Ministry of Health's initial 13 March response to the pandemic was halted and scaled back by President Bolsonaro less than a day later, with power transferred on 16 March from the ministry to the office of General Walter Souza Braga Netto, the Cabinet Chief of Staff.
- 31 May: Brazil confirmed more than five hundred thousand cases; the number of cases had doubled in less than 14 days.

==== June ====
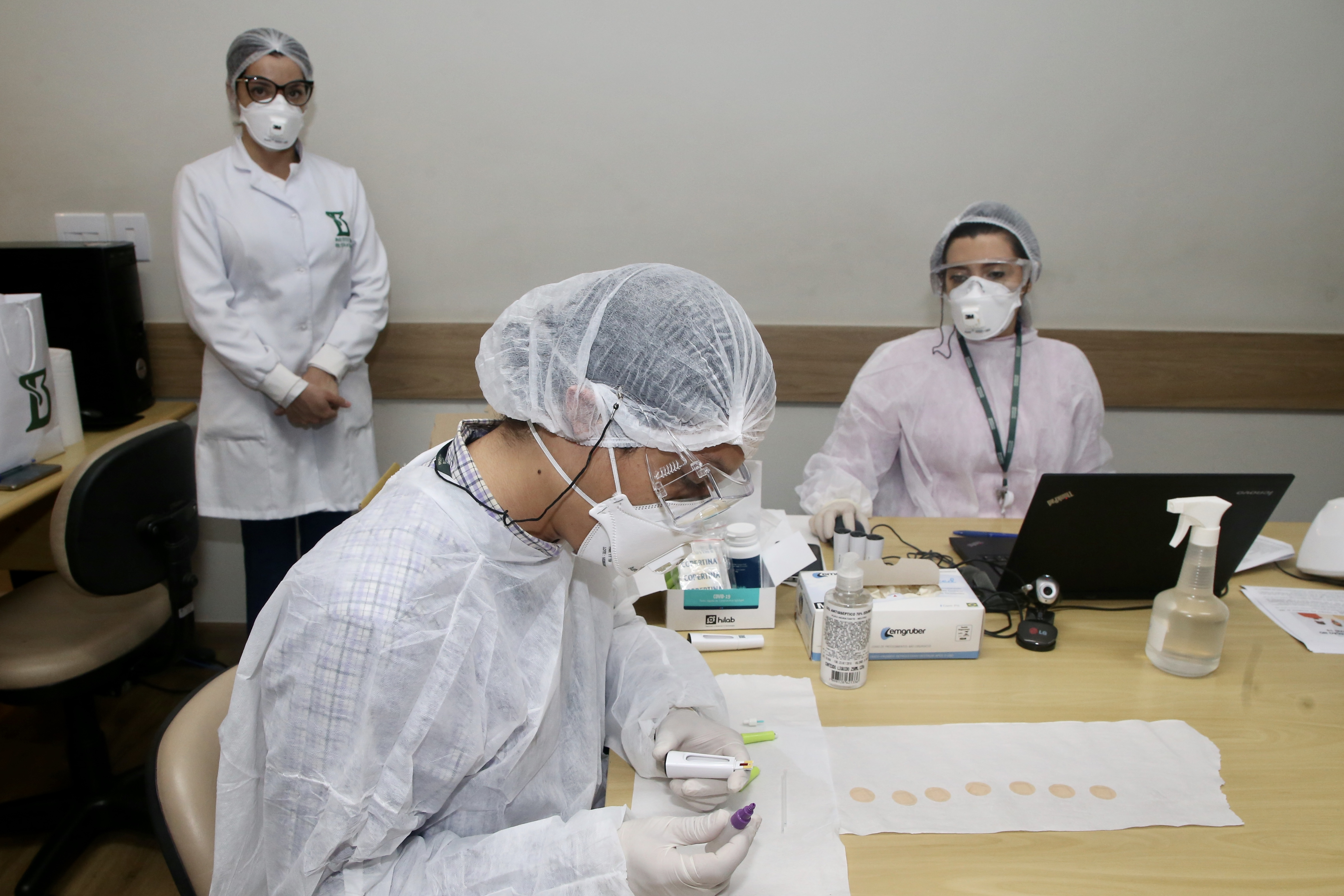
COVID-19 testing in São Paulo

- 1 June: Brazil confirmed more than 30,000 deaths.
- 5 June: The Brazilian government shut down its official website with COVID-19 daily reports, and stated it will no longer report the total number of deaths or active cases.
- 6 June: Carlos Wizard, the new Secretary of Science and Technology of the Ministry of Health, claimed that states are inflating the number of COVID-19 deaths in Brazil as a budget diversion scheme, and called for a recount of the total number of deaths.
- 7 June: The government decided that it will no longer publish cumulative COVID-19 numbers, claiming that former numbers may have been misleading. The health ministry plans to publish only the numbers of new cases and deaths in the past 24 hours. In response, large media groups in the country established a council to keep recording and publishing data according to the original method, amid claims that the government's initiative could be a maneuver to mislead the population instead.
- 9 June: A court order forced the Brazilian government to continue publishing cumulative case and death counts.

==== July ====
- 6 July: President Bolsonaro has a fever and was tested for coronavirus.
- 7 July: President Bolsonaro tests positive for COVID-19.
- 25 July: President Bolsonaro tests negative for COVID-19.
- 30 July: First Lady Michelle Bolsonaro tests positive for COVID-19.

==== August ====
- 3 August: General Braga Netto, the chief of staff to President Bolsonaro, tests positive for COVID-19.
- 8 August: Brazil reaches three million infections and 100,000 deaths.
- 25 August: Senator Flávio Bolsonaro, the eldest son of President Bolsonaro, tests positive for COVID-19.

==== September ====
- 3 September: Brazil reaches four million infections and about 125,000 deaths.
- 9 September: A two month old child dies of COVID-19 in São Bernardo do Campo, possible the youngest death in the ABC Region.

==== October ====
- 6 October: Brazil reaches five million infections.

==== November ====
- 20 November: Brazil reaches six million infections.

==== December ====
- 25 December: Brazil reaches 190,000 deaths.
- 31 December: Variant B117 is identified in São Paulo.

=== 2021 ===
==== January ====
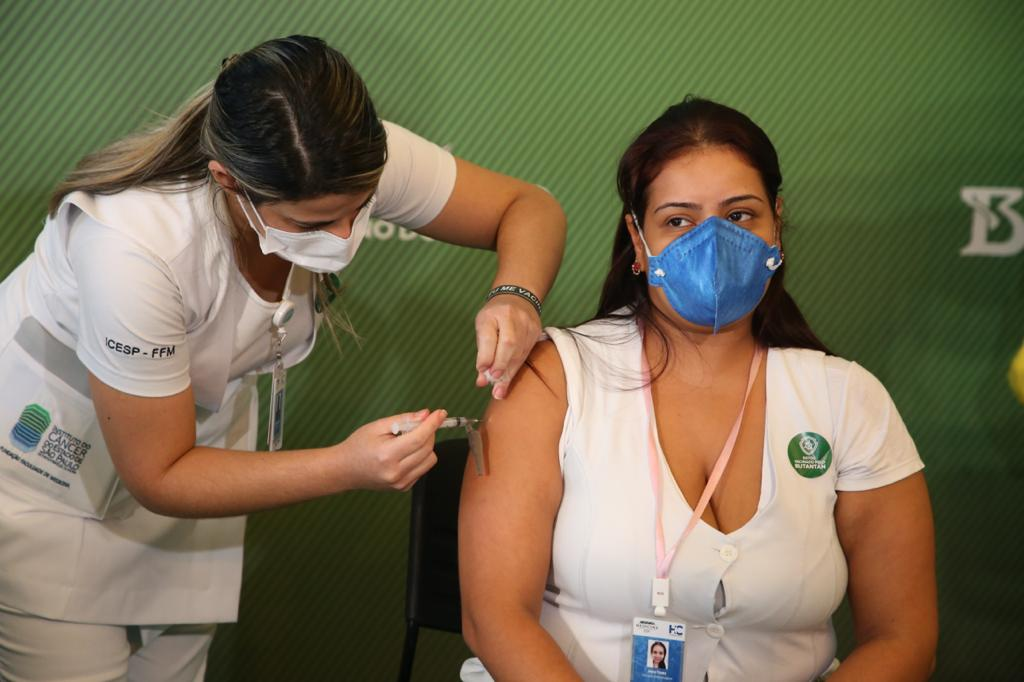
The vaccination campaign begins.

- 7 January: Brazil reaches 200,000 deaths.
- 11 January: The Ministry of Health pressures the administration of the city of Manaus to adopt chloroquine and ivermectin as "premature treatment" drugs, stating that not using them would be "inadmissible". (The use of ivermectin as a supposed "miracle" drug for COVID-19 was already widespread as of December 2020 despite there being no good scientific evidence supporting such usage.)
- 12 January: Researchers from the Brazil-UK CADDE Project announce the discovery of a variant of strain in Manaus, which was called P.1. According to Felipe Naveca, a scientist at the Oswaldo Cruz Foundation, there is no doubt that the variant appeared in the Amazon, and may be more contagious. In the view of the researcher Ester Sabino, from Institute of Tropical Medicine, the resurgence of cases in Manaus was associated with the novel P.1 SARS-CoV-2 variant, which was later labeled as Gamma variant of concern by World Health Organization.
- 14 January: Demand for oxygen peaked in the city of Manaus, in Amazonas, and the city could not supply the demand. Some patients died of asphyxiation, and some were transferred to other states. The city implemented an overnight curfew. Venezuelan Foreign Minister Jorge Arreaza, on instructions from Nicolás Maduro, offered his country's oxygen stock to the government of Amazonas. It was later revealed that Brazilian officials had been warned of the oxygen supply crisis six days earlier.
- 17 January: Anvisa has authorized the emergency use of CoronaVac and the AstraZeneca-Oxford University vaccine. Monica Calazans, 54 years old and part of the risk group, a nurse in the fight against COVID, became the first Brazilian to take CoronaVac officially outside the tests.
- 21 January: Research from the University of São Paulo and the Conectas Direitos Humanos revealed the "existence of an institutional strategy to spread the virus, promoted by the Brazilian Government under the leadership of the Presidency of the Republic".

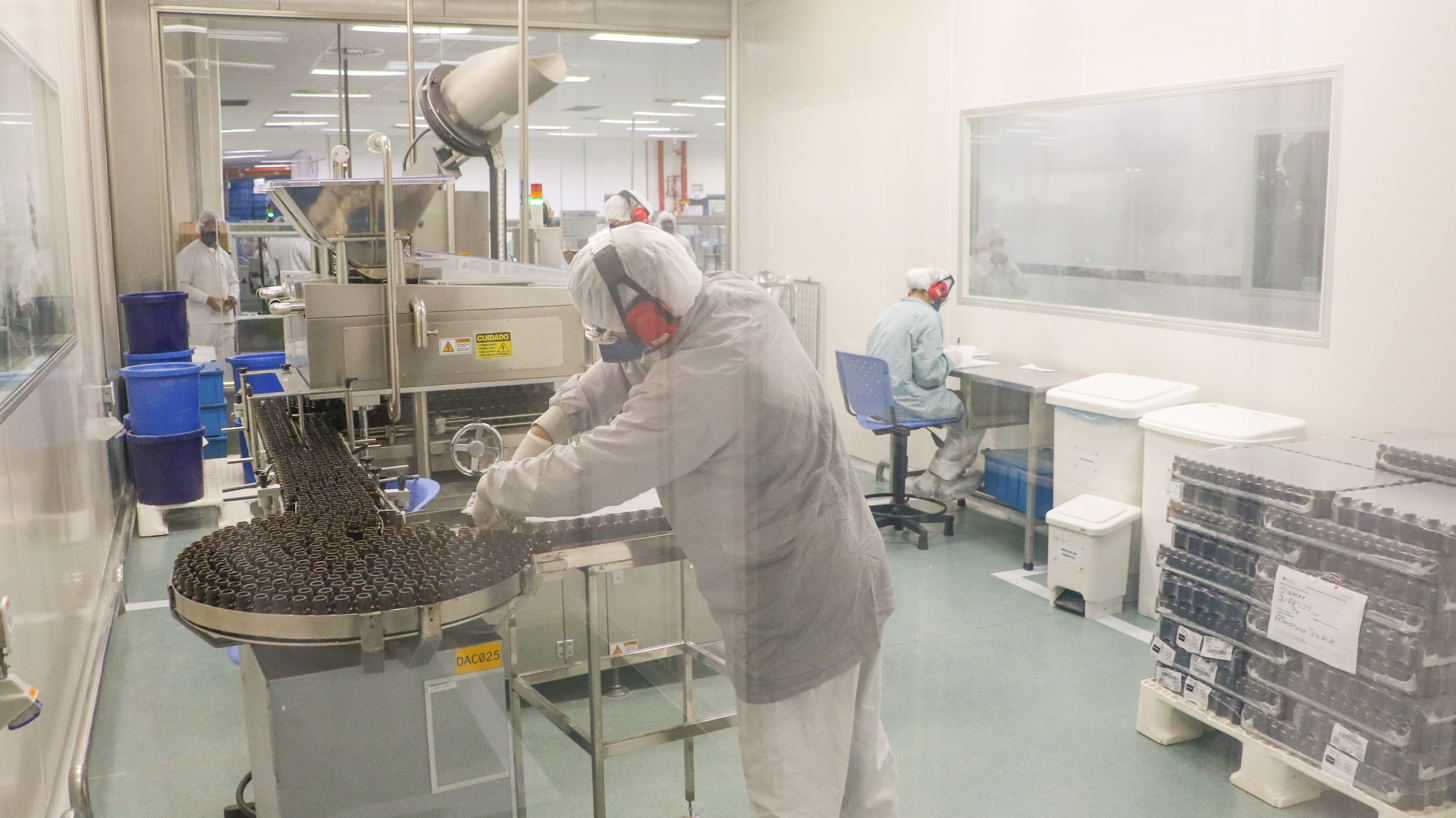
Pharmaceutical company União Quimica started production of Sputnik V vaccine in Brazil in January 2021.

- 27 January: Brazil reaches 220,000 deaths. The Lancet publishes an article concerning the possible causes of an "unexpected" increase in January hospital admissions in Manaus, including the emergence of the P.1. variant. (Hospitalizations in Manaus, where an estimated 76% of the population had been infected by October 2020, remained at low levels for seven months from May to November.)
- 28 January: The Lowy Institute, an independent think tank in Australia, describes Brazil's response to the pandemic the worst in the world.

==== February ====
- 1 February: Since vaccination started on 17 January, 2,220,216 people have been vaccinated. This represents 1.05% of the national population, and 25.21% of the doses received by the states.
- 9 February: After repeatedly stating he did not approve of, and that his administration would not purchase Chinese company Sinovac's vaccine, Bolsonaro backpedals and states that he was "never against the vaccine". Bolsonaro also stated he did not intend to take the vaccine, and is the only G20 leader to have done so.
- 16 February: Brazil reaches 240,000 deaths.
  Since vaccination started on 17 January, 5,505,049 people have been vaccinated – of which 308,791 have also received the second dose. This represents 2.6% of the national population.
- 17 February: Serrana, São Paulo participates in a study wherein 100% of its adult population is vaccinated with CoronaVac while other communities complain of shortages. Prior to the mass vaccination, 5% of Serrana's population had been infected, one of the highest rates in Brazil. Only two million doses of vaccines have arrived in the country so far.
- 25 February: On the day Brazil reached a record high 1,582 deaths by COVID-19 in 24 hours, during his weekly livestream, Bolsonaro questioned the efficacy of mask usage and lockdowns, citing an unspecified German study to justify his doubts on the first. The study that seems to have been referenced by Bolsonaro has been debunked multiple times, and is deemed non-scientific.

==== March ====
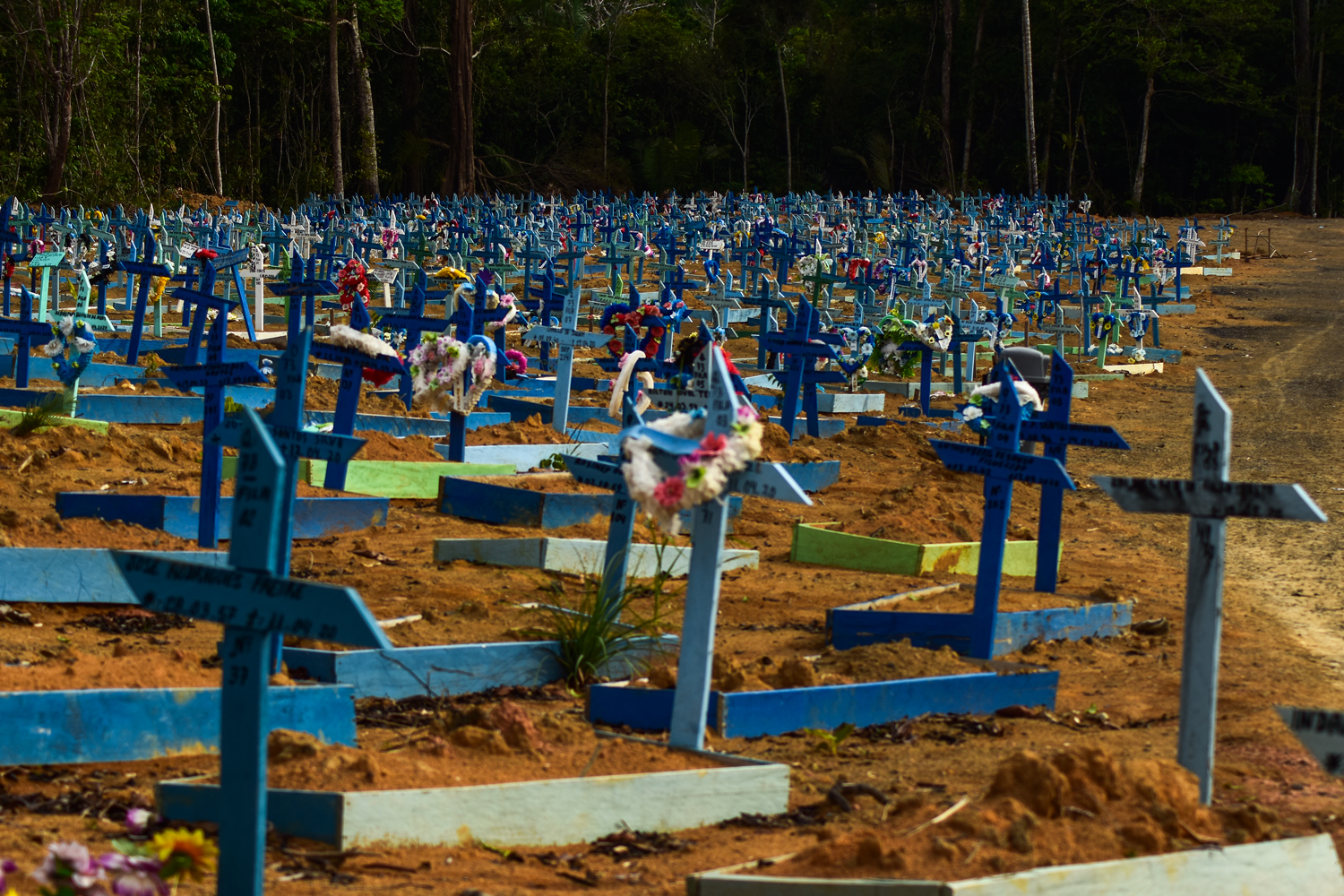
COVID-19 victims at the Parque Taruma cemetery in Manaus.

- 3 March: For the second consecutive day, Brazil breaks its record of daily COVID-19 deaths, with a total of 1,910 over the span of 24 hours. During a conversation with his supporters, Bolsonaro stated that "if it's up to [him], Brazil will never have a lockdown".
- 13 March: The government official reported an-always high new infection toll with +76,178 cases in 1 day. There is now a total of 11,439,558 cases, and 277,102 deaths. 9,669,967 people have taken the first shot of COVID-19 vaccine.
- 14 March: The ICUs of 14 Brazilian states were over 90% occupied, and those of another 7 Brazilian states and the Federal District were 80–90% occupied.
- 15 March: Brasil de Fato reported the United States Department of Health and Human Services attempted to pressure the country not buy Sputnik V vaccine to diminish Russia's influence in the region. This did not stop a consortium of Brazilian governors in some states from signing a 37 million dose purchase agreement.
- 17 March: Brazilian Health Officials deem the Hospital crisis "the worst in Brazil's history".
- 19 March: The ICUs of 16 Brazilian states were over 90% occupied, "meaning those health systems have collapsed or are at imminent risk of doing so," according to CNN.
- 25 March: Over 100,000 new COVID-19 cases were confirmed in a single day, the highest rate of diagnosis since the pandemic began.
- 31 March: There is now a total of 12,753,258 cases and 321,886 deaths.

==== April ====
- 1 April: Prostitutes in Minas Gerais go on strike to pressure the Ministry of Health into classifying sex workers as a priority group for COVID-19 vaccines. The effort ultimately proves unsuccessful.
- 7 April: For the first time, Brazil has recorded over 4,000 confirmed COVID-19 deaths in 24 hours.
- 8 April: Luís Roberto Barroso (STF), determined the Senate begin a parliamentary investigation commission (CPI) to "investigate possible omissions by the federal government in dealing with the Covid pandemic".
- 9 April: President Jair Bolsonaro authorizes government campaign for mask wearing and social distancing.
- 13 April: A commission created by the Order of Attorneys of Brazil concluded that Jair Bolsonaro committed high crimes and misdemeanors, which would constitute grounds for impeachment. They concluded that "Bolsonaro acted deliberately to propagate the Covid-19 virus, and that he should be held accountable for the deaths due to the pandemic". Additionally, they argue that Bolsonaro committed crimes against humanity for attempting to prevent efforts against the pandemic. The Brazilian Senate opened the CPI da COVID that will also "investigate the use of federal funds passed to the federal entities to combat the new coronavirus." On this same day, in Itirapina (São Paulo), 46 people were mistakenly vaccinated with Coronavac, as opposed to the influenza vaccine.
- 14 April: Five children, between 7 months and 4 years old, were mistakenly vaccinated with the CoronaVac in Diadema instead of the Influenza vaccine. The children will be followed for 42 days, but there have been few studies yet on how this vaccine performs in children. The BBC reported that the international non-governmental organization Vital Strategies estimates that about 2,000 children under age 9 (including 1,300 babies) have died in Brazil from COVID-19, although the Health Ministry's numbers reflect only about a third that number.

==== May ====
- 5 May: Jair Bolsonaro perpetuated an extremely controversial conspiracy theory that the COVID-19 virus could have been made intentionally in a lab as a form of biological warfare. He then indirectly pointed to China as the country whose GDP had grown the most during the pandemic.

==== October ====
- 31 October: The government ends the financial assistance program. Cash transfer programs continue with Auxílio Brasil, replacing Bolsa Família, announced in October.

==== November ====
- 30 November:: The Omicron variant was detected in São Paulo, the first in South America.

==== December ====
- 10 December: The Ministry of Health and many of the public healthcare systems are taken down by a ransomware attack.
- 16 December: Anvisa has authorized the use of Pfizer–BioNTech vaccine for children from 5 to 11 years old.

=== 2022 ===
==== January ====
- 14 January: The state of São Paulo kicks off the vaccination on children. Davi Seremramiwe, an 8-year-old child Xavante, was the first to receive a dose of the pediatric Pfizer vaccine.
- 20 January: Anvisa has authorized the emergency use of CoronaVac vaccine for children and teenagers from 6 to 17 years old.

==== November ====
- 22 November: Anvisa has authorized the emergency use of Pfizer–BioNTech bivalent vaccine for adults and teenagers from 12 years old.

=== 2023 ===
==== February ====
- 27 February: The Brazilian government kicks off a national COVID vaccination campaign and application of bivalent vaccines, at first, on prioritary groups (adults from 60 years old, low immunity people, health workers).

==== March ====
- 28 March: There is now a total of 700,000 deaths.

==== July ====
- 24 July: Anvisa gives full authorization for the Pfizer–BioNTech bivalent vaccine.

==== August ====
- 18 August: The Ministry of Health confirms the first case of EG.5 subvariant in Brazil.

== Vaccination ==
The COVID-19 vaccination campaign in Brazil is an ongoing mass immunization campaign for the COVID-19 pandemic in Brazil. It started on 17 January 2021, when the country had 210 thousand deaths.

The Instituto Butantan imported the first 6 million doses of CoronaVac in a collaboration with the Chinese company Sinovac Biotech.

There is no deadline forecast for immunizing the country's entire population due to the lack of supplies for vaccine production and also due to political disputes between the São Paulo state government and the Jair Bolsonaro government.

According to a June 2022 study published in The Lancet, COVID-19 vaccination in Brazil prevented an additional 1 million deaths from 8 December 2020 to 8 December 2021.

== Responses ==
=== Scientific research and forecast ===
On 19 March 2020, scientists predicted up to 2 million deaths in Brazil in the worst-case scenario without measures to contain the virus. They pointed out that a policy of social distancing was one of the most effective measures given the lack of a vaccine.

On 20 March, experts from Italy warned that the coronavirus growth curve in Brazil would repeat that of European countries. An observatory with physicists from USP, University of Campinas, São Paulo State University, University of Brasília, Federal University of ABC, UC Berkeley and the University of Oldenburg showed that the number of infected people, considering data from 19 March, had been doubling every 54 hours, and that the case total would exceed 3,000 by the 24th.

On 21 March, researchers began to mobilize to increase the availability of testing in Brazil. The Federal University of Rio de Janeiro was attempting to create a serology test, as opposed to the more common PCR test, to detect infections through a patient's blood samples. Minister of Health Luiz Henrique Mandetta said that the number of cases would increase exponentially until the end of June.

On 23 March, a report from FGV economist Emerson Marçal predicted a negative 2020 GDP of up to 4.4% due to the effect of the coronavirus.

Eleven COVID-19 patients died after receiving high doses of the anti-malarial drug chloroquine in a study in Brazil. This was reported in mid-April. The study was halted.

On 15 August 2020, three joint-ventures began testing a new COVID-19 vaccine in Brazil. The origin of the research and development became a hugely debated issue, further complicated by conspiracy theories spread by anti-vax groups and renowned political allies of Jair Bolsonaro, Brazilian President along with xenophobia.

=== Preventive measures ===
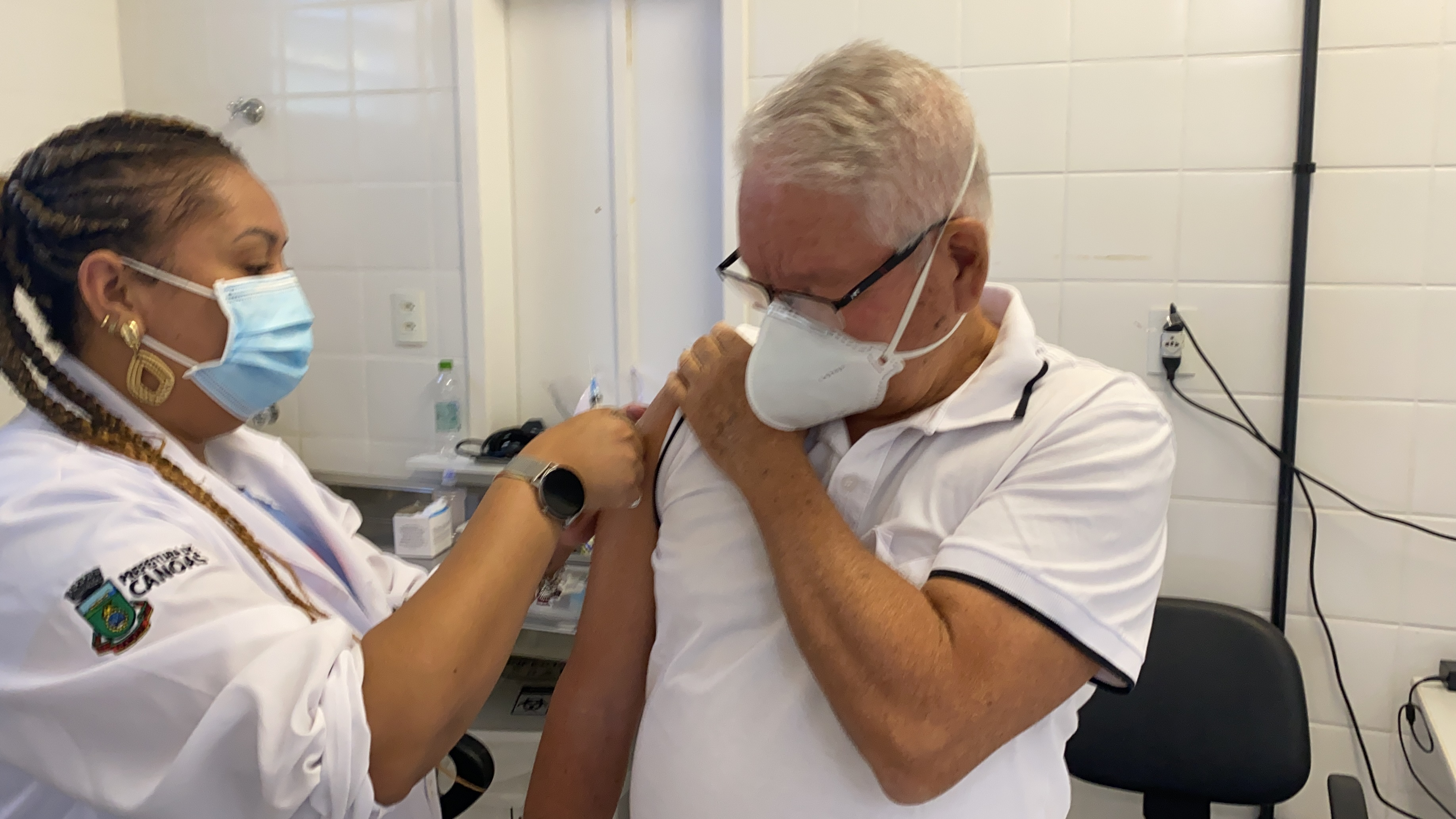
Elderly receiving second dose of CoronaVac vaccine in Brazil

On 13 March, the Ministry of Health recommended that those travelling to Brazil self-isolate for at least 7 days on arrival.

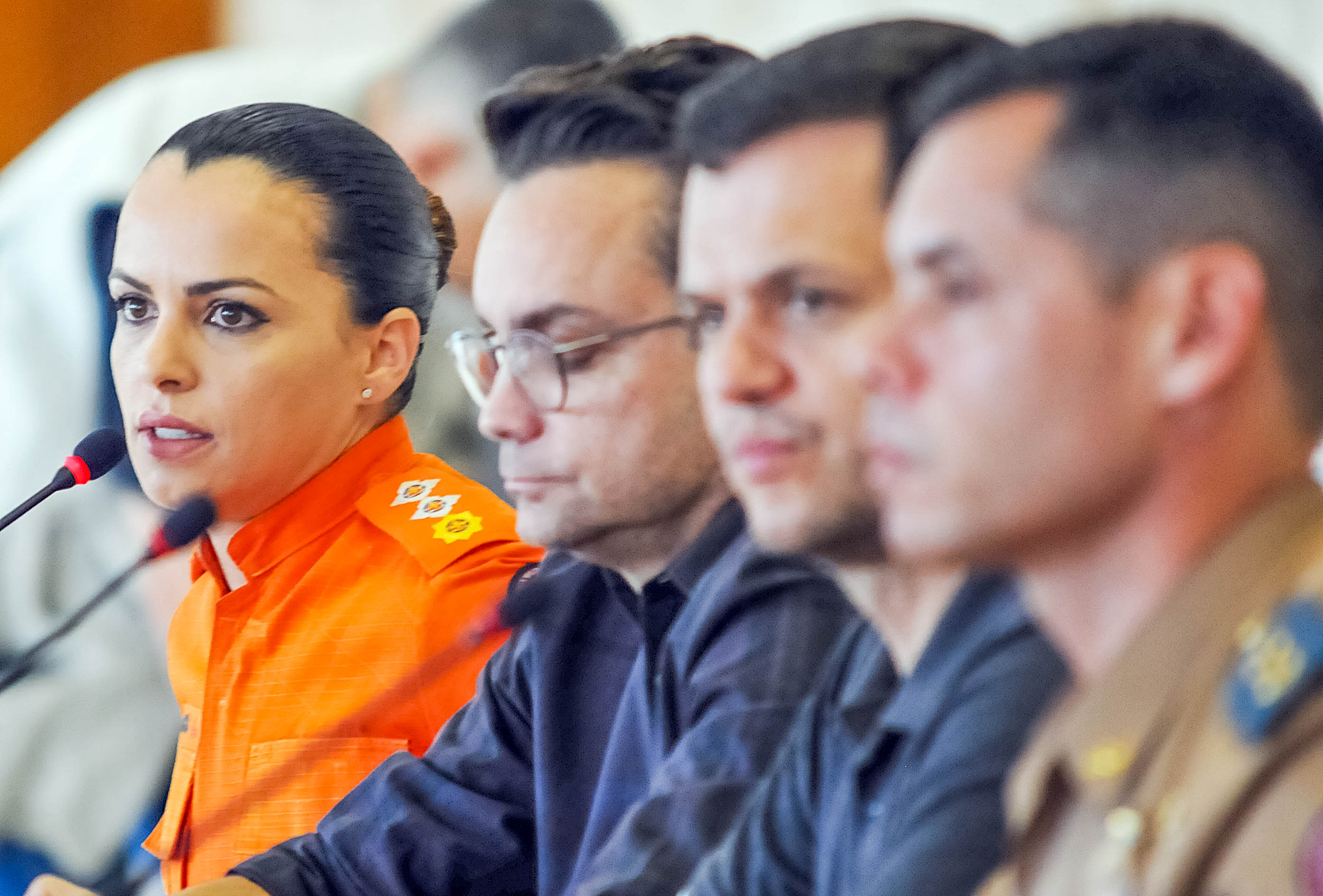
Brazilian firefighters assigned to aid in the detection of suspected cases

On 17 March, Brazilian authorities partially closed their border with Venezuela. Health Minister Luiz Henrique Mandetta had urged closure of the border due to Venezuela's collapsing health system. The state of Santa Catarina declared a state of emergency, and ordered the closure of all non-essential businesses, and suspended public transit, inter-city and inter-state buses, public meetings, concerts, theatres, sporting events and religious services.

On 18 March, Rio de Janeiro and five other municipalities—São Gonçalo, Guapimirim, Niterói, Nova Iguaçu, and Mesquita—in the state of Rio de Janeiro had declared a state of emergency to help contain the coronavirus.

The following day, the government of Rio Grande do Sul declared a public emergency situation. Among the measures adopted were the prohibition of interstate travel and the restriction of items purchased in the markets.

On 20 March, the government of Rio Grande do Norte declared a public emergency situation.

On 21 March, cases in São Paulo rose almost 40% in two hours. Deaths also increased in the period. The state issued a lockdown order for non-essential businesses, lasting from 24 March through at least 7 April.

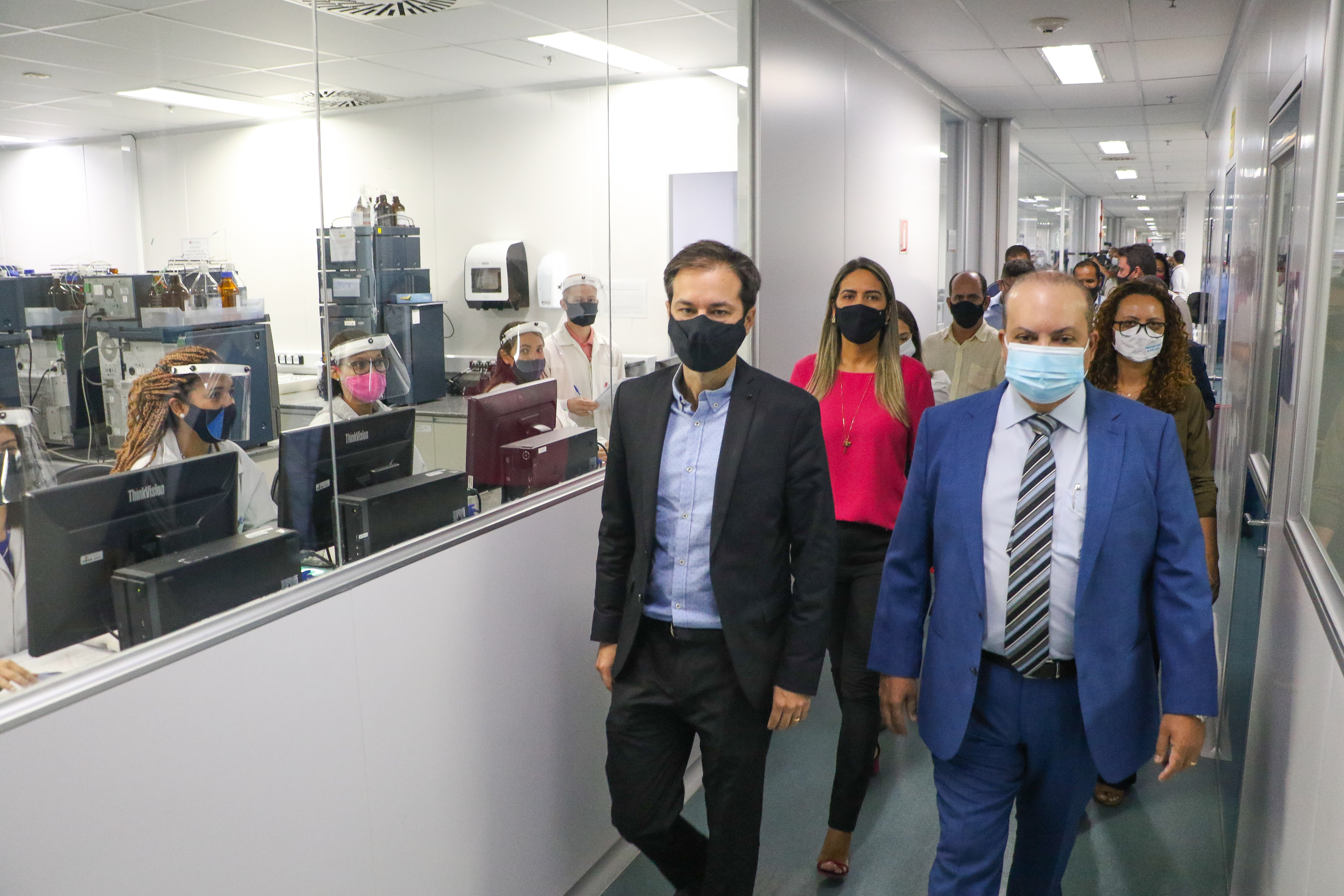
Brazilian Governor Ibaneis Rocha (Federal District, in blue suit) wearing a face mask

Cities in the Campinas region declared an emergency situation. In addition to the metropolis, Hortolândia, Holambra, Indaiatuba, Itapira, Jaguariúna, Mogi Guaçu, Mogi Mirim, Paulínia, Sumaré and Águas de Lindoia issued decrees with special measures to contain the spread of COVID-19 cases. Valinhos and Vinhedo declared a state of public emergency.

On 9 May, the government of Rio Grande do Sul established a new social distancing plan. Given that some areas were more affected than others, the local government organized the state in 20 sectors. Each sector is ranked – according to the number of cases, hospital occupancy rates, and other factors – from Yellow (low risk), to Orange, Red, and Black (high risk). The goal of this scale is to be able to respond better to the current pandemic, and allow the population on lower risk areas to return to a somewhat normal life.

=== Presidential responses ===
In a press briefing on 27 March 2020, Bolsonaro downplayed the possibility that COVID-19 could spread rapidly nationwide, arguing that Brazilians "never catch anything", and that there was a possibility that portions of the population were already immune. He has described the threat of COVID-19 as being exaggerated and as a media-created "fantasy".

==== Masks ====
On 15 March 2020, Bolsonaro made an appearance during a pro-government rally in Brasília, interacting with his supporters. He faced criticism for participating without taking precautions (such as wearing a mask), especially after his press secretary was infected following his presidential visit to the United States. On 27 November 2020, he reiterated his belief that masks are ineffective at limiting the spread of the virus, and he said that discussion of masks was "the last taboo to fall".

==== Vaccines ====
Bolsonaro opposed proposals to purchase the Sinovac Biotech vaccine, but the country's health agency granted approval for Phase 3 trials in São Paulo.

On 27 November 2020, Bolsonaro acknowledged that the country's health agency had approved effective vaccines, but added that he personally would not take any COVID-19 vaccine. In 2021, it was revealed that he had repeatedly refused offerings by Pfizer to get tens of millions of doses of their vaccine at a discount. In contrast, millions of Covaxin doses were purchased in June 2021 at elevated prices.

In October 2021, Facebook and YouTube removed a video in which Bolsonaro falsely claimed that COVID-19 vaccines could increase the risk of contracting AIDS. The original source of the claim was The Exposé, a British conspiracist website. The Brazilian Supreme Court ordered a probe to be opened into Bolsonaro for the claim.

==== Misinformation about treatments ====
In late March 2020, Facebook, Inc. and Twitter pulled social media posts by Bolsonaro that promoted hydroxychloroquine as an effective treatment for COVID-19, with the companies considering them misinformation that could cause physical harm, and a contradiction of authoritative health information respectively. Twitter also pulled a similar post by Bolsonaro that called for the reopening of the economy.

==== Concern about business interests ====
On 15 March 2020, Bolsonaro claimed that businesses were profiting off "hysteria", and he said the public should not react with "neurosis."

He has opposed proposals to suspend interstate travel between states with cases, and the closure of businesses (including malls and weekly outdoor markets), arguing in the case of the latter that they were "extreme measures" that would hurt the economy. Governor of São Paulo João Doria criticised President Bolsonaro for his inaction on COVID-19, which had required individual states to take on responsibilities that should have been taken on at the federal level.

On 19 March, President Bolsonaro's son Eduardo shared a Twitter post that which blamed the Chinese Communist Party for the worldwide spread of COVID-19. As China is Brazil's largest trading partner, the post provoked criticism from Chinese diplomats such as Yang Wanming – who argued that Bolsonaro family was "the great poison of this country."

In a presidential address on 22 March 2020, Bolsonaro continued with these arguments, criticising the use of "scorched earth" mitigation measures such as closing businesses and restricting travel, questioning the closure of schools due to there being more infections among the elderly, and accusing the media of spreading a "feeling of dread" among the population.

==== Comments by Bolsonaro ====
In a presidential address on 22 March 2020, he argued that the lives of Brazilians needed to return to normality, and that "because of my background as an athlete, I wouldn't need to worry if I was infected by the virus. I wouldn't feel anything or at the very worst it would be like a little flu or a bit of a cold."

In a televised interview on 23 March 2020, Bolsonaro criticised the protests against him, arguing that "the people will soon see that they were tricked by these governors and by the large part of the media when it comes to coronavirus".

On 28 April 2020, when a reporter pointed out that Brazil's death toll had surpassed China's, he replied, "So what? I'm sorry, but what do you want me to do?" In another interview in the same month, when questioned about the death toll in Brazil, Bolsonaro replied saying that "[He was] not a grave-digger."

On 7 July 2020, after announcing that he had tested positive, Bolsonaro remarked "There's no reason for fear. That's life", and continued to criticise lockdown measures, arguing that "the majority of Brazilians contract this virus and don't notice a thing", and that "You can't just talk about the consequences of the virus that you have to worry about. Life goes on. Brazil needs to produce. You need to get the economy in gear."

In March 2021, when Brazil's death toll saw a record rise over a 24-hour period, Bolsonaro stated: "Stop whining. How long are you (the brazilian people) going to keep crying about it?"

==== Political reactions and public opinion ====
On 21 March 2020, it was reported that Alcolumbre, president of the Chamber of Deputies Rodrigo Maia, and the leaders of the major parties in the National Congress, no longer believed that they could conduct productive dialogue on COVID-19 with Bolsonaro.

The 22 March 2020 presidential address was met with a negative response by many Brazilian politicians, (Note: They included: Davi Alcolumbre (DEM-AP) President of the Senate, Rodrigo Maia (DEM-RJ) President of the Chamber, Felipe Santa Cruz President of the OAB, Gilmar Mendes Minister of the STF, Wilson Witzel (PSC) governor of Rio de Janeiro, Helder Barbalho (MDB) governor of Pará, Alexandre Frota (PSDB-SP) federal deputy, Joice Hasselmann (PSL-SP) federal deputy, Janaina Paschoal (PSL-SP) state deputy, Rodrigo Pacheco (DEM-MG) senator, Kim Kataguiri (DEM-SP) federal deputy, José Serra (PSDB) former Minister of Health, José Ricardo Roriz vice president of Fiesp, Leila do Vôlei (PSB-DF) senator, Renato Casagrande (PSB) governor of Espírito Santo, Wellington Dias (PT), governor of Piauí, Fátima Bezerra (PT) governor of Rio Grande do Norte, Antônio Anastasia (PSD-MG) senator, Fernando Henrique Cardoso former president, João Amoêdo ex-president of the New Party, Enio Verri (PT-PR) federal deputy, Eduardo Braga (MDB-AM) senator, Humberto Costa (PT-PE) senator, Randolfe Rodrigues (Rede-AP) senator, Alessandro Molon (PSB-RJ) federal deputy, Flávio Dino (PCdoB) governor of Maranhão, José Nobre Guimarães (PT-CE) federal deputy, Rogério Carvalho (PT-SE) senator, Fernanda Melchionna (PSOL-RS) federal deputy, Weverton Rocha (PDT-MA) senator, Marcelo Freixo (PSOL-RJ) federal deputy, Paulo Pimenta (PT -RS) federal deputy, Jean-Paul Prates (PT-RN) senator, Eliziane Gama (Cidadania-MA) senator, Marcelo Ramos (PL-AM) federal deputy, Arnaldo Jardim (Cidadania-SP) federal deputy, Reinaldo Azambuja (PSDB) governor of Mato Grosso do Sul, Wilson Lima (PSC) governor of Amazonas.) as well as critics of Bolsonaro; in a Twitter post, journalist Ricardo Noblat referred to it as the "first political suicide broadcast live on national radio and television." João Doria told CNN that Bolsonaro was "an unprepared and psychopathic leader." The ongoing public protests against the President intensified during and after the address.

In mid-March 2020, panelaços began to occur in major cities such as Rio and São Paulo, including protests in support of the president, and others calling for his resignation. According to one poll, 64% of Brazilians rejected the way Bolsonaro had been handling the pandemic, while 44.8% supported his impeachment, an all-time high. According to some sources in Congress, Bolsonaro was shutting down political dialogue on purpose and forcing his impeachment to mobilize his supporters.

In October 2021, a Brazilian congressional panel voted to recommend criminally charging two companies and 78 individuals as laid out in a 1,288 report. Bolsonaro is one of the individuals described in the report; nine criminal charges were recommended for him, including "crimes against humanity."

Natália Pasternak Taschner, the president of the Instituto Questão de Ciência, microbiologist, and research scientist at the University of São Paulo, has addressed the spread of misinformation from the government and other sources. She has appeared frequently on Jornal Nacional and written a weekly science column for O Globo.

=== Accountability of Federal Council of Medicine ===
Several scientific and health entities, such as the Oswaldo Cruz Foundation, the Brazilian Society for the Advancement of Science, and the National Health Council, expressed concern and criticism of the Federal Council of Medicine's stances on the COVID-19 pandemic in Brazil, which is cited in COVID-19 CPI.

== Impact ==
=== Economy ===
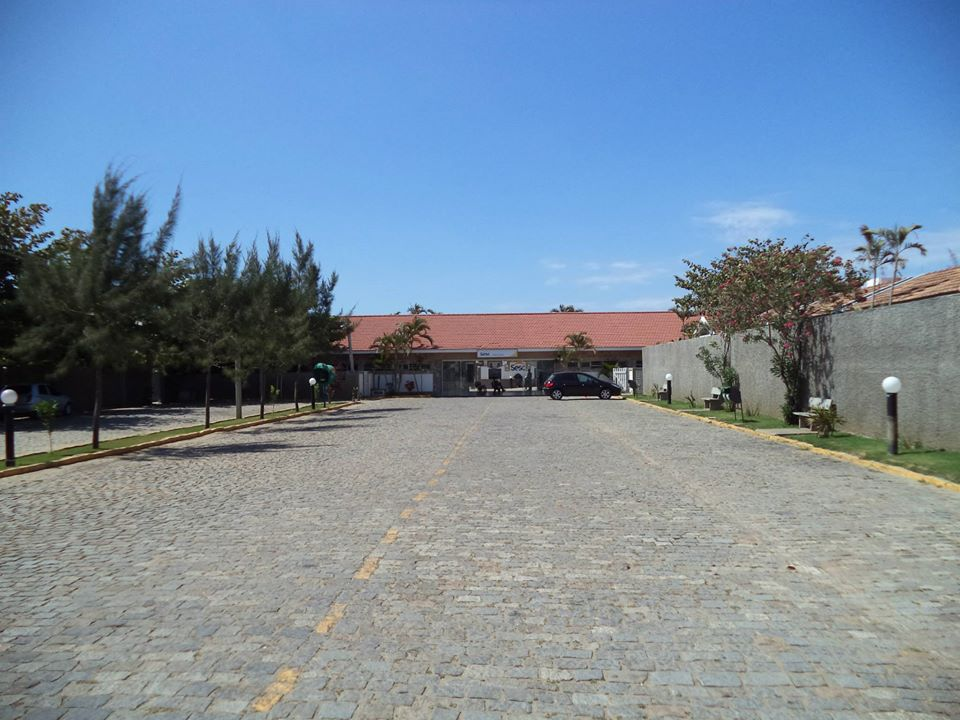
A branch of SESC Hotels in São João da Barra had to close down due to the financial crisis caused by the pandemic.

Economists expect an economic stagnation for the country in 2020. On 16 March, the Ministry of Economy announced a stimulus package of R$147.3 billion (US$29 billion) to help the economy against the effects of the pandemic. The Brazilian government is also in negotiations with the New Development Bank to receive an aid package for its COVID-19 efforts; China received one billion USD from the same institution.

On 21 March, Economy Minister Paulo Guedes announced a series of aid measures to reduce the impact on the economy. A scholarship for self-employed professionals, to the amount of R$200, is being prepared, in addition to the payment guarantee for workers who have reduced working hours.

On 23 March, government announced package of R$85.8 billion for states and municipalities. The amount includes transfers to the health area, recomposition of transfers of constitutional funds and suspension of the maturity of debts of the states with the Union.

The economy shrunk by an unparalleled 9.7 percent in the second quarter of 2020 and plunged Brazil into a recession.

By the end of 2020, Brazil's GDP had shrunk by 4.1%; the worst recorded since 1990.

In 2020, Brazil was instrumental in the continued reduction of extreme poverty in Latin America and the Caribbean. This was largely due to the effective implementation of fiscal policies aimed at mitigating the economic impacts of the COVID-19 pandemic.

=== Education ===
By 20 March, the pandemic had impacted education all over the world. There were nationwide school closures in over 100 countries. However, President Jair Bolsonaro announced few country-wide measures to slow the spread of the virus, and because the federal government decided not to cancel classes in the whole country, lower levels of government have done so on independently. Municipal, state, and private schools and universities had different reactions regarding the suspension of classes. Classes were suspended at once, gradually or not at all. Some of them were replaced with distance education or simply postponed. Because of that, there are only "localized" (as opposed to "national") school closures, according to UNESCO.

=== Employment ===
From 2015 to 2016, Brazil experienced a crippling recession that saw its economy decrease by about 7% with an extremely small amount of growth seen from 2017 to 2018. At the beginning of the pandemic, Brazil had hitherto been suffering from this economic dilemma. With COVID-19 now added to the list of problems, 83.5% of Brazil's labour market were pushed into an exposed state. According to Rogério Barbosa, a professor at the IESP Institute for Social and Political Studies; due to the pandemic, between social-distancing and the fear of becoming infected by the virus, between 17 and 19 million people have stopped searching for employment in Brazil.

=== Environment ===
The deforestation of the Amazon rainforest has accelerated during the COVID-19 pandemic in Brazil, increasing by over half compared to baseline levels, according to satellite imagery. COVID-19 threatens indigenous communities in the Amazon region.

=== Favelas ===
Low socio-economic status is known to be a risk factor for COVID-19. By 17 March, residents of favelas in Rio de Janeiro suffered from a lack of water. Without water to clean themselves, this made them vulnerable to the proliferation of coronavirus. Water did not reach parts of the Baixada Fluminense and the North Zone of Rio de Janeiro. Among the affected areas are the Chatuba de Mesquita, Camarista, Méier and Complexo do Alemão communities. The infectious disease doctor and pediatrician Cristiana Meirelles said that without clean running water, the situation of fighting the epidemic would become catastrophic. Cufa (Central Única das Favelas, a NGO that operates with Favelas) called for measures to contain coronavirus in favelas. Government actions did not include the economically fragile, a contingent that totals more than 70 million people, said the organization.

Some areas of Maré had been without water for two days, and other areas were reported to have been without water for two weeks.

=== Healthcare ===
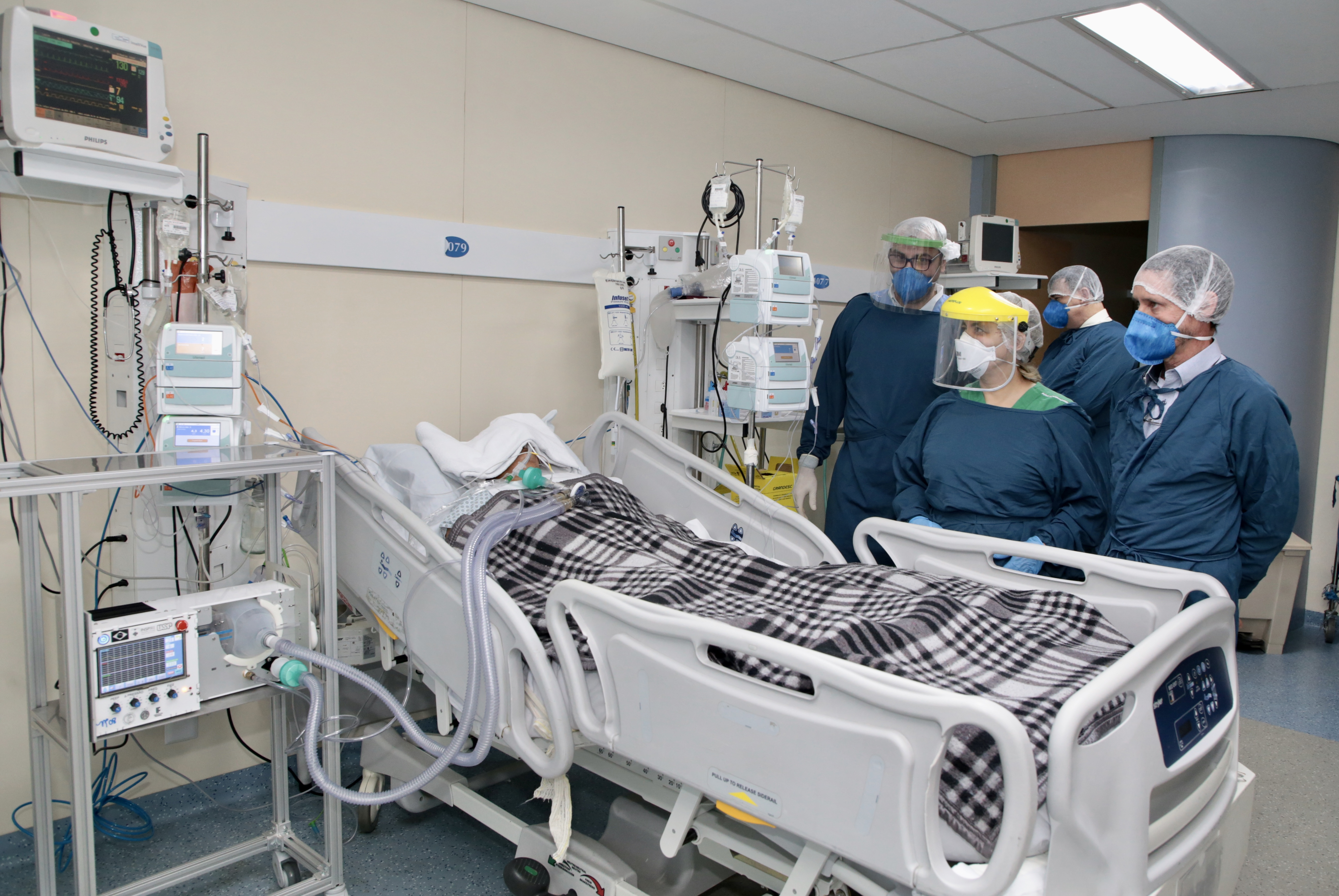
Doctors check on a patient on a ventilator at InCor in São Paulo.

Following the first reported cases in Brazil, there were concerns whether its healthcare system would be able to deal with the pandemic. On 12 March, the Ministry of Health requested an additional R$10 billion (US$2.1 billion) to the federal budget as part of its efforts to manage the pandemic. It estimated that 2,000 intensive care units would be immediately needed.

On 18 March 2020 hospitals in São Paulo denounced a lack of health materials, such as masks, gloves and hand sanitizer, caused by an increase in prices. According to them, packages of masks went from R$4.50 in January to R$140 by 17 March. The government said it will negotiate with industry to meet the demand.

In Salvador, local shops experienced shortages of masks and hand sanitizer. Rio and five other municipalities in the state declared an emergency to contain the coronavirus. The municipalities of São Gonçalo and Guapimirim also declared a state of emergency; Niterói, Nova Iguaçu and Mesquita declared an emergency situation in the area of public health.

On 19 March 2020 scientists predicted up to 2 million deaths in Brazil in the worst-case scenario, without measures to contain the coronavirus. They pointed out that maintaining social distance was one of the most effective measures in the absence of a vaccine. Their conclusion came after analyzing the growth curve of COVID-19 cases in Brazil. The contagion rate was the same as that registered in Italy, as the number of infected people had been doubling every 54 hours. According to estimates, the number of confirmed cases might reach 3,000 by 24 March. According to the Ministry of Health, the number of infected patients would grow exponentially until the end of June. The mayor of Belo Horizonte, Alexandre Kalil (PSD), asked General Altair José Polsin, commander of the 4th Army Region, for the temporary assignment of 51 professionals from the army garrison to assist in the demands of fighting the coronavirus. The Brazilian Army has not yet said whether it will meet this demand. Peak cases of COVID-19 in Belo Horizonte were expected to occur in the first week of April. In an interview, the health secretary announced the creation of two more Respiratory Disease centers and was studying placing PMs to serve the population.

The Government of Rio Grande do Sul decreed a public emergency situation, with measures including the prohibition of interstate travel and the restriction of items purchased in the markets, with the decree in force from 19 March 2020. Employees at four public hospitals in the city of São Paulo reported a shortage of materials such as alcohol gel, masks and gloves when caring for patients with suspected coronavirus. Professionals in the Sistema Único de Saúde (SUS) reported a shortage of masks and rationing of gel alcohol, though the situation of public-service workers was different from that of private hospitals in São Paulo, the latter of which had sufficient equipment to care for patients. Stores specializing in medical supplies no longer had alcohol gels and masks, including N95 masks used by health professionals. Street vendors were reported to be taking advantage of the demand for equipment and trying to profit from it.

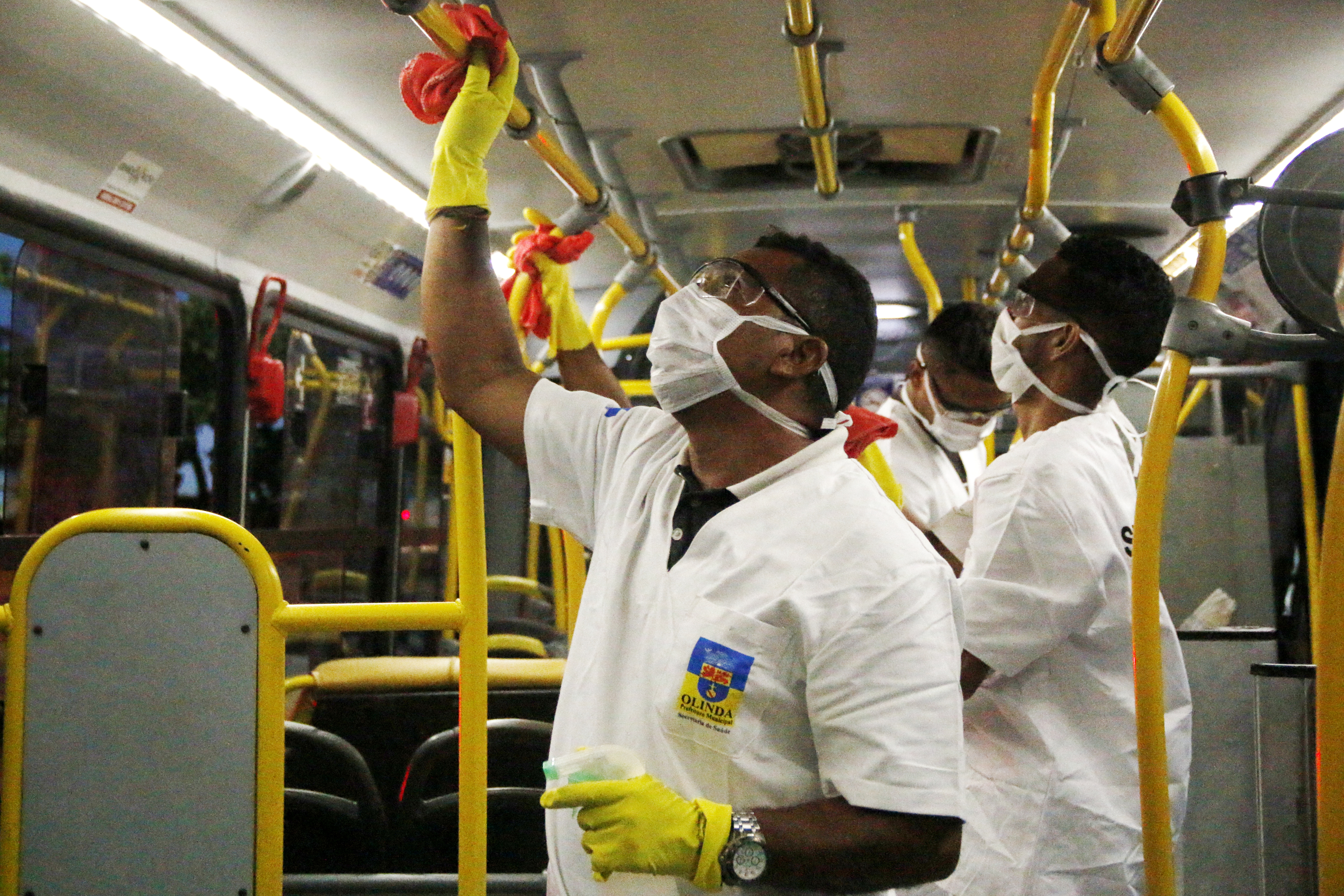
Health professionals clean up public transport to prevent spread of the virus.

On 20 March the press reported that Brazil was contradicting the recommendation of the World Health Organization by only testing patients in a severe condition. João Gabbardo, executive secretary at the Ministry of Health, said that the criteria adopted would not change, and people with serious cases would be tested for COVID-19. The following day, a group of scientists announced they were developing new COVID-19 tests in Brazil. They expect to elaborate a test which will work with a single drop of blood from the patient. They expected it to be ready during the current outbreak of COVID-19, and hoped to engage some of the main Brazilian universities in its development. Without protective items, health workers improvised caps as masks in hospitals. In addition to the first cases of coronavirus in Acre, health professionals in the state had to deal with the lack of personal protective equipment (PPE). Some agents improvised with caps as masks.

On 31 March, the U.S. federal government donated two million doses hydroxychloroquine to Brazil, for prophylactic and therapeutic use.

Health professionals in the state of Rio de Janeiro (RJ) complained about the lack of conditions to work with patients in COVID-19. Doctors said there were no N95 masks, with a more efficient filter, at Hospital Salgado Filho. Unions said there was a shortage of personal protective equipment in hospitals.

=== Religious services ===
Dom Odilo Scherer, Archbishop of São Paulo, had initially defended the position that churches should not be closed, arguing that there should be more daily services to diffuse large gatherings. Later, he declared the suspension of celebrations with the people. Bishop Edir Macedo, founder of the Universal Church of the Kingdom of God, also declared that services should not be suspended, as well as Silas Malafaia, leader of Assembleia de Deus Vitória em Cristo. Malafaia said he would only close his churches if mandated by a court order. Macedo caused greater controversy after he dismissed coronavirus as a creation of the media.

=== Television programming ===
Brazilian networks started airing prevention tips during their programming. Globo, SBT, RecordTV, Band, and RedeTV! announced they would stop production of all of their telenovelas, and would record their talk shows without a live audience, while expanding journalism in their programming.

== Statistics ==
=== Case fatality rate ===
The trend of case fatality rate for COVID-19 from 26 February, the day first case in the country was recorded.

== See also ==
- COVID-19 CPI
- COVID-19 vaccination in Brazil
- COVID-19 pandemic by country
- COVID-19 pandemic in South America
