= Natalia Pasternak Taschner =

Brazilian microbiologist and science advocate (born 1976)

Natalia Pasternak
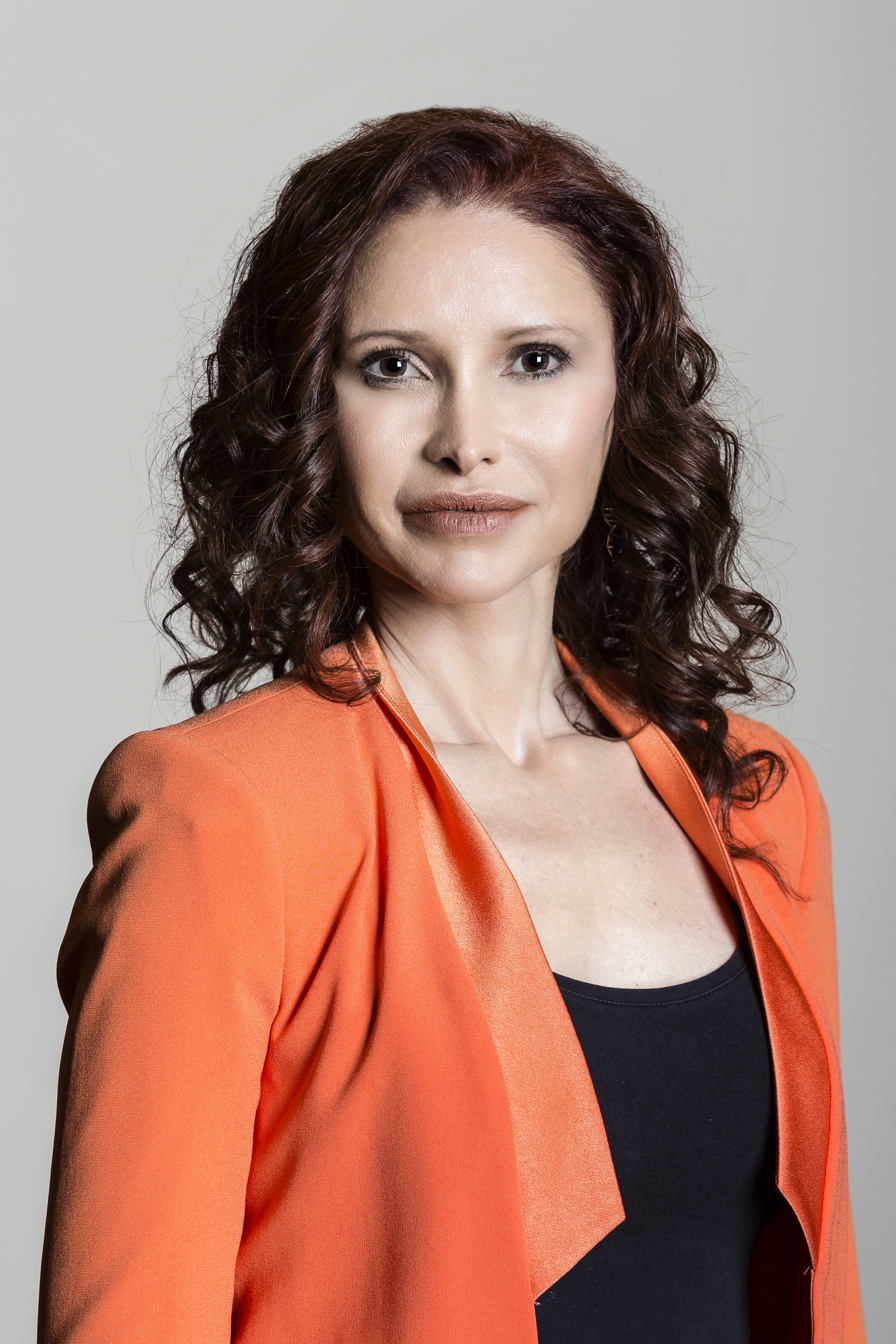
- Pasternak in 2018
- Born: 15 May 1976 (age 50); São Paulo, Brazil
- Education: University of São Paulo
- Scientific career
- Fields: Microbiology; Molecular genetics of bacteria
- Workplaces: University of São Paulo
- Thesis: The regulation of alkaline phosphatase by the sigma factor S of RNA polymerase from Escherichia coli (2006)
- Doctoral advisor: Beny Spira
- Website: iqc.org.br/diretoria/natalia-pasternak

Natalia Pasternak Taschner (born 15 May 1976) is a Brazilian microbiologist, author, and science communicator. She is the first president of the Instituto Questão de Ciência (IQC) (English: Question of Science Institute). She was director of the Brazilian arm of the science festival, Pint of Science (2016–2019), columnist for the Brazilian national newspaper "O Globo", for The Skeptic magazine (UK), and Medscape (WebMD). She also hosts two weekly radio shows "The hour of Science" at Brazil's CBN national radio station. Taschner is also the publisher of Brazil's first magazine on critical thinking, Revista Questao de Ciencia.

She contributes as a visiting professor at the Public Administration School at Fundação Getúlio Vargas, São Paulo, as well as a research collaborator at the University of São Paulo. She is the first Brazilian to be named a fellow of the Committee for Skeptical Inquiry (CSI) in the United States. She has received numerous other awards and recognitions.

Science in our Daily Lives, which received Brazil's National Literature prize for best science book in 2021 (Prêmio Jabuti), and Against Reality: Science Denialism, Its Causes and Consequences, are two of her books on science popularization. She is the only Brazilian on the BBC's list of the 100 most influential women in 2021, and she is now an Adjunct Senior Research Scholar at Columbia University's Center for Science and Society, thanks to Professor Stuart Firestein's offer. Her research focuses on ways to enhance science communication and battle denial and disinformation, as well as bringing scientific thought to future policymakers and assisting in the establishment of a worldwide partnership for evidence-based global policies.

== Education and career ==
Born into a Jewish family, Natalia Pasternak Taschner is daughter of university professors Mauro Taschner and Suzana Pasternak. Pasternak entered the University of São Paulo (USP) in 1998 and received her BSc degree in Biological Sciences in 2001. She subsequently obtained a PhD degree in Biological Sciences (Microbiology) in 2006 from the Institute of Biosciences of the University of São Paulo (IBS-USP), with the thesis entitled The regulation of alkaline phosphatase by the sigma factor S of RNA polymerase from Escherichia coli. From 2007 to 2013 she completed a post-doctorate in microbiology, in the field of molecular genetics of bacteria at the University of São Paulo.

Pasternak founded the science blog Café na Bancada (English: "Coffee on the Lab Bench"), with the mission statement: "Difundir a ciência com café!" (English: "Spread the science with coffee!"). The website is defunct but continues as a blog, started in 2015, on Facebook. Pasternak became director of the Brazilian arm of Pint of Science from 2015 to 2019, in which she coordinated scientific lectures in bars in more than 50 cities in Brazil. As of 2020, Pint of Science was being managed by Luis Gustavo Almeida.

In 2018 she became the first president of the Instituto Questão de Ciência, (IQC) an organisation focused on the defense of scientific evidence used in public policies. Pasternak went as far as to invest her own money into the formation of the IQC, making her the second philanthropist in Brazil to invest private money in science communication. IQC is a co-organizer, along with Aspen's Office for Science and Society, of the 2020 "Aspen Global Congress on Scientific Thinking and Action" in Rome.

Early in 2020 Pasternak organised the first specialization course in the public communication of science in the city of São Paulo. The course aims to train journalists and other communication professional about the dissemination of science.

Pasternak has been made a Fellow of the Committee for Skeptical Inquiry in 2020. Since September 2021, Pasternak has been a visiting scholar at Columbia University's Center for Science and Society.

== Activities ==
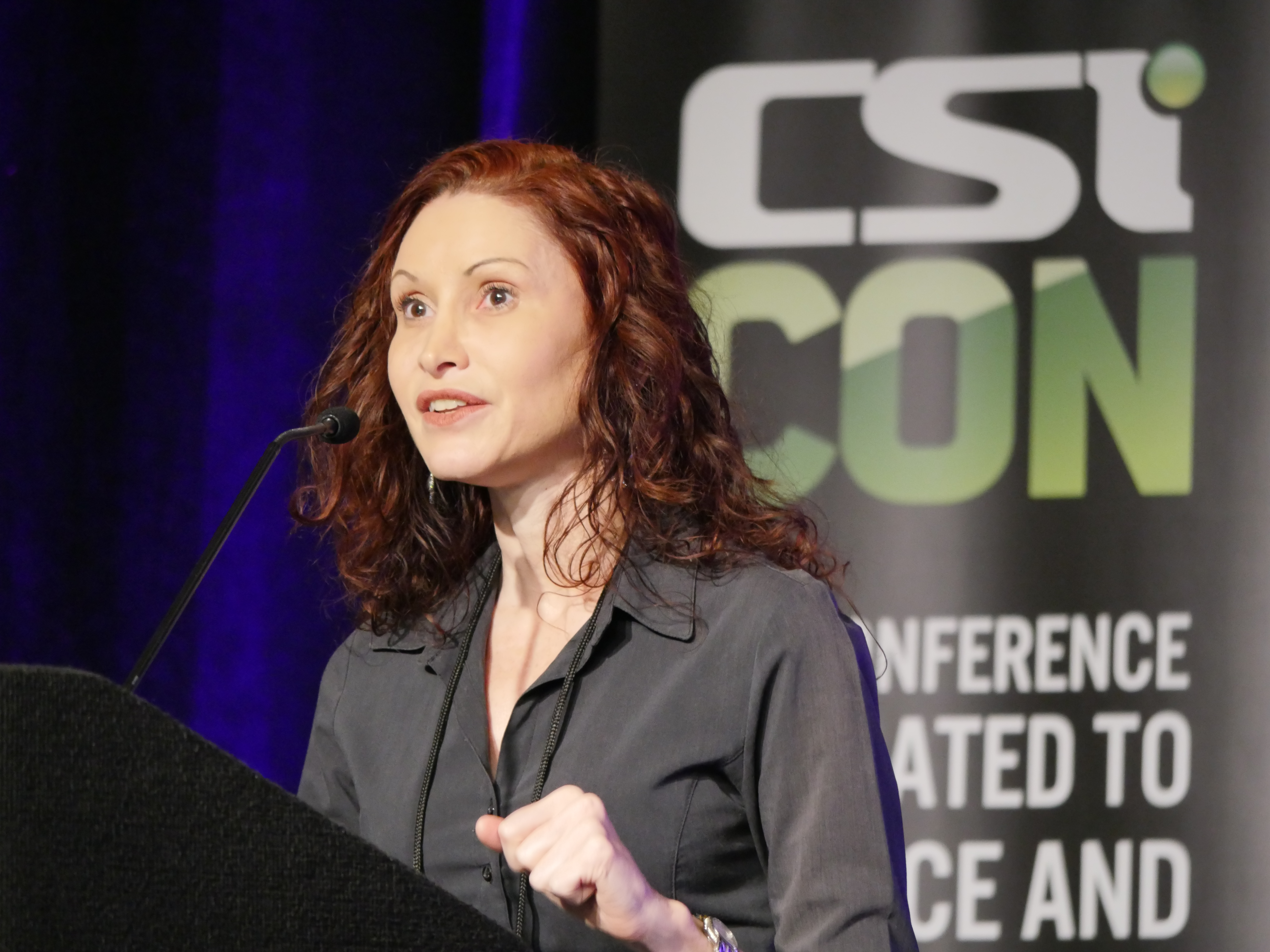
Natalia Pasternak Taschner CSICon 2018 Politicization of Science CAMs in the Brazilian Public Healthcare System

Taschner has been involved in many activities related to the promotion of science, and attended several conferences and seminars including:

- Taschner has contributed to the Genetic Literacy Project on the fear of biotechnology, GMO mosquitos, and opposition to pesticides.
- Taschner presented "Politicization of Science: CAMs in the Brazilian Public Healthcare System" at CSICon 2018 and "Brazilians Love and Support Science! Or is it Pseudoscience?" at CSICon 2019.
- In 2019 she organised a cycle of seminars about ignorance, in partnership with the University of São Paulo
- In 2018 she presented "How to spread science in Brazil" at the Academic Congress of Uncisal
- Taschner exhibited at the International Day of Light in 2018 at the UNESCO headquarters in Paris.
- She had an exhibition at the 61st anniversary of the Planetarium in São Paulo, 2018.
- In 2017 she participated in "4º Fala Ciência – Curso de Comunicação Pública de Ciência e Tecnologia" promoted by Universidade Federal de Viçosa
- She presented a TEDx USP Talk titled "A ciência brasileira e Síndrome de Cassandra" (English: Brazilian science and Cassandra syndrome)
- In 2016, Taschner was involved in the Brazilian National Science and Technology Week festival
- In 2008, Taschner participated in the "XII International Congress of Bacteriology and Applied Microbiology" in Istanbul. She presented a paper entitled The Xanthomonas axonopodis citri PHO regulon.

== Presence in media ==
Most media relating to Taschner can be found on the IQC website. In 2020 Taschner co-authored an article with Carlos Orsi for Skeptical Inquirer entitled "Believing" In Science Is Not "Understanding" The Science: Brazilian Surveys.

Taschner appeared in the journal Skeptic in 2018 with an article entitled "Brazilian Cancer Quackery".

Taschner has been interviewed on several occasions, including:

- Friends of Science in Medicine interviewed her for the April 2019 edition.
- Susan Gerbic interviewed Taschner for Skeptical Inquirer in the lead-up to CSICon 2018.
- Stuart Vyse interviewed Taschner for the Jan/Feb 2020 edition of Skeptical Inquirer.
- Rob Palmer interviewed Taschner at CSICon 2019 for The Skeptic Zone podcast, episode 756.
- Brian Kirby interviewed Taschner at CSiCon 2019 for 502 Conversations.
- Science Magazine quoted her in an article about the risk of reducing rigor in testing hydroxychloroquine for treatment of COVID-19.
- Cara Santa Maria interviewed Taschner for her podcast, Talk Nerdy.

Taschner has lectures at Casa do Saber on "What is Science and why trust it?", "Brazilian Science: Unknown to Brazilians" and the anti-vax movement.

Several of Taschner's lectures and presentations are available on YouTube, including:

- Follow the opening of the academic semester of UnB with the biologist Natalia Pasternak.
- Stand Up Scientists !
- Conversations with Scientists
- Brazilian scientists and Cassandra's syndrome

== Selected publications ==
=== Journals ===
Taschner has published several journal articles, including:

- Taschner, Natalia Pasternak; Orsi, Carlos (2021). "Science based public policies: Lessons from Covid19 on the use of randomized trials". Genetics and Molecular Biology. 44 (1 Suppl 1) e20200273. doi:10.1590/1678-4685-GMB-2020-0273. PMC 7876434. PMID 33543746.
- Taschner, Natalia Pasternak; De Almeida, Luiz Gustavo; Orsi, Carlos (2021). "Revising the "Hype Pipeline" Model in Scientific Communication". Frontiers in Communication. 6 601023. doi:10.3389/fcomm.2021.601023.
- De Almeida, Luiz Gustavo; Pasternak Taschner, Natalia; Lellis-Santos, Camilo (2021). "Outbreak! An Online Board Game That Fosters Collaborative Learning of Viral Diseases". Journal of Microbiology & Biology Education. 22 (1) 2539. doi:10.1128/jmbe.v22i1.2539. PMC 8060139. PMID 33953816.
- Taschner, Natália Pasternak; Orsi, Carlos; Almeida, Paulo; Pilati, Ronaldo (2022). "The impact of personal pseudoscientific beliefs in the pursuit for non-evidence-based health care". Journal of Evidence-Based Healthcare. 3 e3516. doi:10.17267/2675-021Xevidence.2021.e3516.
- Taschner, Natalia Pasternak (December 2021). "Vaccine hesitancy: Old story, same mistakes". Journal Health NPEPS. 6 (2) e5876. doi:10.30681/252610105876.
- Taschner, Natalia; Yagil, Ezra; Spira, Beny (25 February 2013). "The effect of IHF on sigmaS selectivity of the phoA and pst promoters of Escherichia coli". Archives of Microbiology. 185.
- Galbiati, Heloisa F.; Taschner, Natalia P.; Spira, Beny (27 May 2014). "The effect of the rpoSam allele on gene expression and stress resistance in Escherichia coli". Archives of Microbiology. 196 (8): 589–600. Bibcode:2014ArMic.196..589G. doi:10.1007/s00203-014-0994-y. ISSN 0302-8933. PMID 24862098. S2CID 18793775.
- Piantola, Marco Aurélio Floriano; Moreno, Ana Carolina Ramos; Matielo, Heloísa Alonso; Taschner, Natalia Pasternak; Cavalcante, Rafael Ciro Marques; Khan, Samia; Ferreira, Rita de Cássia Café (2018). "Adopt a Bacterium – an active and collaborative learning experience in microbiology based on social media". Brazilian Journal of Microbiology. 49 (4): 942–948. doi:10.1016/j.bjm.2018.04.005. ISSN 1517-8382. PMC 6175964. PMID 29728341.

=== Books ===
1. Taschner NP. Negacionismo da ciência e do Holocausto: estratégias econsequências. In: Schurster, Karl; Gherman, Michel; Ferreiro-Vázquez, Oscar. (Org.). Negacionismo: A construção social do fascismo no tempo presente. 1. ed. [S. l.]: EDUPE, 2022. p. 261–277.
2. Taschner NP. Science-basedpublic policies: bridging the gap between academia and policy makers. In: Hellequin, Anne Peggy; Barbeitas, Mady Malheiros. (Org.). Sociétés, crises et santé publique en Europe, en Amérique latine et dans les Caraïbes. 1ed.:, 2022, v., p. 169–186.
3. Taschner NP., & Orsi, C. (2021). Contra a realidade (1st ed). Editora Papirus.
4. Almeida. L. G, Baima, C, Taschner, N. P., & Orsi, C. (2020). Contra-dossiê das evidências sobre homeopatia, Instituto Questão de Ciência, São Paulo, Brazil.
5. Taschner, N. P., & Orsi, C. (2020). Ciência no Cotidiano: Viva a razão. Abaixo a ignorância!. (1st ed.). Editora Contexto.
6. ALENCAR NETO, J. N.; TASCHNER, N P . Prefácio. Manual de Medicina Baseada em Evidências. 1ed.: Sanar, 2021, v., p. 1-.
7. Taschner, N. P., & Orsi, C. (2020). Uma aula de como não testar um medicamento. In P. G. Junior, & M. Cabelo. (Org.), Pandemia e Pandemônio: Ensaios sobre biopolítica no Brasil (38 ed., pp. 27- ). São Paulo, Brazil.

Taschner authored chapter 18 of volume 2 of the book:

- Taschner, Natalia Pasternak (2015). "Ciência e Pseudociência" [Science and Pseudoscience]. In Ekuni, R.; Zaggio, L.; Bueno, O.F.A. (eds.). Caçadores De Neuromitos: O que voce sabe sobre o seu cérebro é verdade? [Neuromyth Hunters: What do you know about your brain and truth?] (in Portuguese). Memnon. ISBN 978-85-7954-084-4.

== Awards ==
She was recognized as one of the BBC's 100 women of 2021.
