= Carmo Planetarium =

Planetarium in Brazil

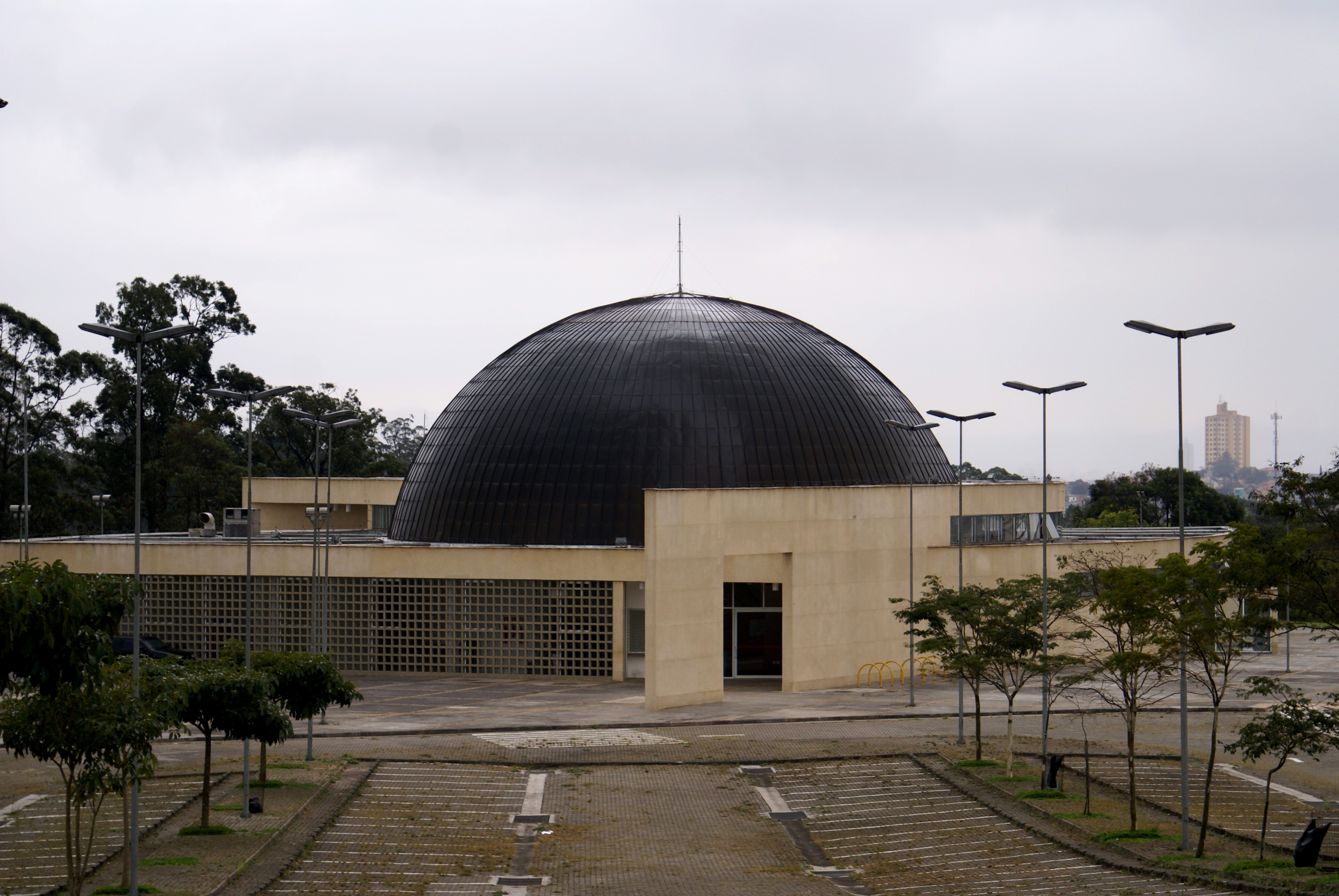
- Carmo Planetarium
- Location: São Paulo
- Coordinates: 23.5769°S 46.45948°W
- Website: www.prefeitura.sp.gov.br/cidade/secretarias/meio_ambiente/umapaz/planetario_do_carmo/

Carmo Planetarium (Portuguese: Planetário do Carmo) is a planetarium in Parque do Carmo, eastern São Paulo, Brazil. It is part of the Open University of the Environment and Culture of Peace (UMAPAZ), and opened on 30 November 2005. It is one of three planetaria in São Paulo, the others being Professor Aristóteles Orsini Planetarium and the Johannes Kepler Planetarium at Sabina Escola Parque do Conhecimento.

== Description ==
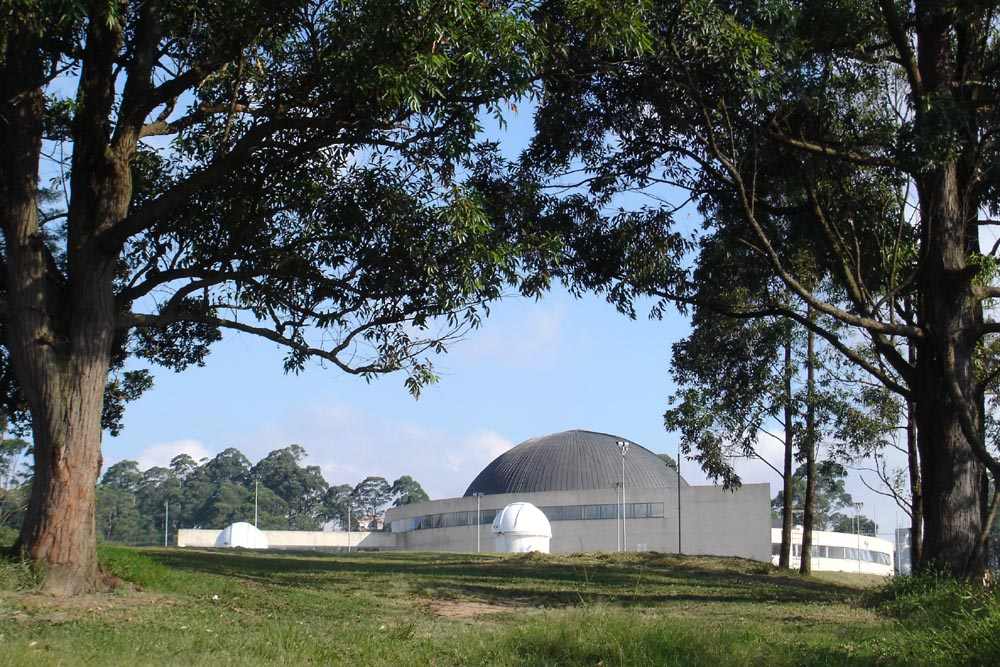
A view of the planetarium

The 1,750 square metres (18,800 sq ft) building has a projection dome that is 10 metres (33 ft) high and 20 metres (66 ft) diameter, with 230 reclining seats, and projection by a Carl Zeiss AG Universarium VIII, which uses 9,000 optical fibres and 109 lenses to portray the night sky. There is also a 70-seat classroom, reading space, and a lobby with exhibitions. Two telescopes are located on a terrace behind the planetarium. The planetarium building cost R$11 million to construct, and the projector cost R$5 million to purchase.

The planetarium is located at 137 John Speers Street. Several bus routes pass near the planetarium. It hosts pre-booked school visits on weekdays, and is open to the public on weekends and some weekdays during school holidays.

== Closures ==
The planetarium closed in 2007 due to structural problems arising from infiltration, and fungi was discovered on the lens of the projector in 2010. The observation area reopened in 2012, before closing again in January 2013 due to a water leak. The planetarium reopened on 8 May 2016, after repairs costing R$1.2 million. It reopened with revised management, and a branch of the astrophysics school (which is primarily located at the other planetarium in São Paulo).
