= Sabina Escola Parque do Conhecimento =

Science museum

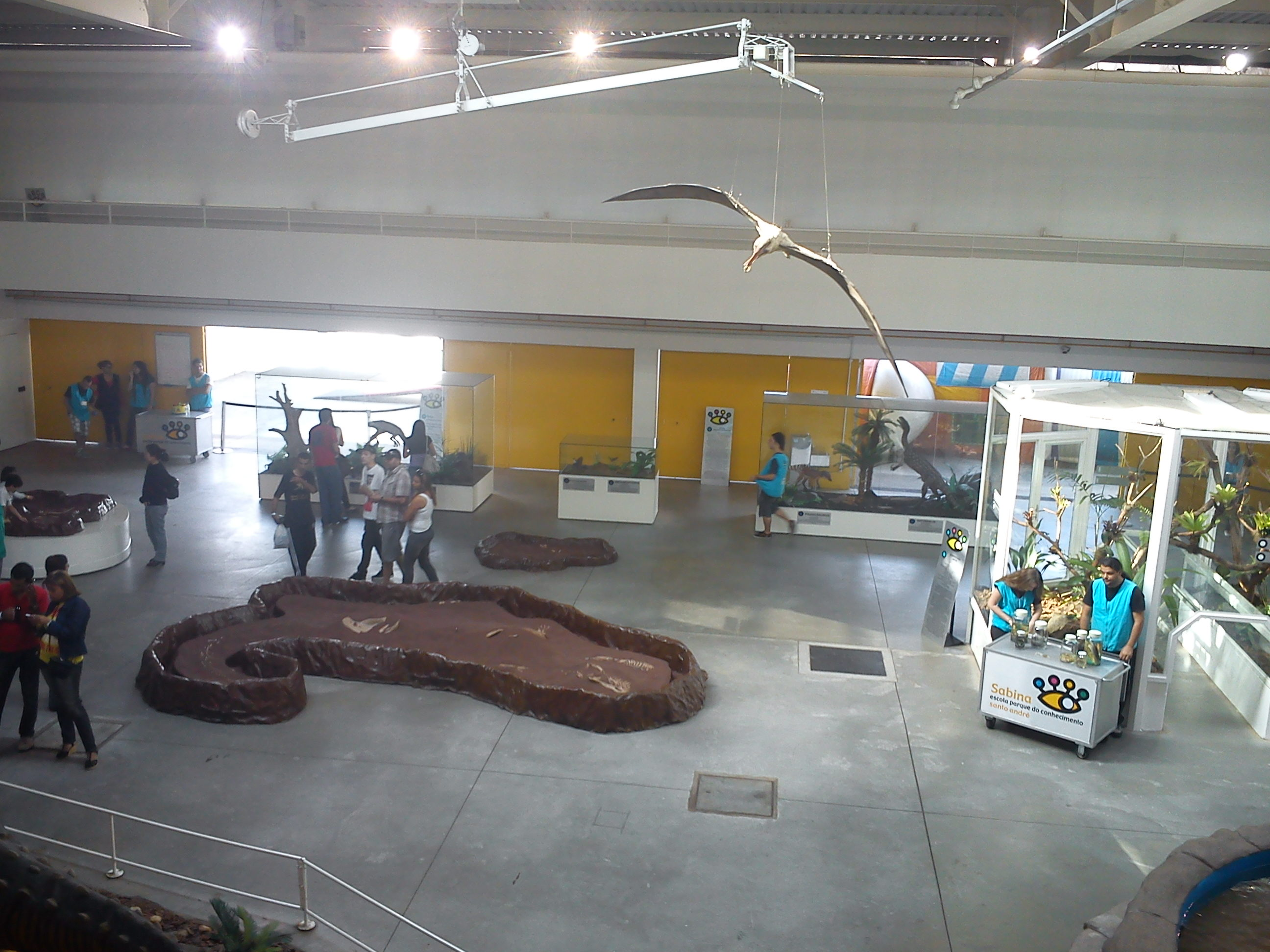
- Inside the main pavilion
- Location: Santo André, São Paulo, Brazil
- Coordinates: 23°40′45″S 46°31′53″W
- Website: sabina.santoandre.sp.gov.br

The Sabina School Park of Knowledge (Portuguese: Sabina Escola Parque do Conhecimento) is a science museum in Santo André, São Paulo, Brazil. Other planetaria in Greater São Paulo include Professor Aristóteles Orsini Planetarium and Carmo Planetarium.

== History ==
The school was created by the Municipal Government of Santo André to provide scientific support to the municipal school network. Originally conceived in 2001, the construction of the building and the initial acquisition of the contents was completed in mid-2006. It was inaugurated on 11 February 2007. The building was designed by Paulo Mendes da Rocha. It is in an area of 24,000 square metres (260,000 sq ft), with the building covering 14,000 square metres (150,000 sq ft).

== Main pavilion ==
The main pavilion covers 11,000 square metres (120,000 sq ft).

== Johannes Kepler Planetarium ==
The planetarium, named after Johannes Kepler, is a 18 m (59 ft)-diameter dome containing 247 seats and 13 wheelchair spaces. It uses a Carl Zeiss AG Starmaster SB to project over 6,000 stars, along with two digital projectors covering the entire dome. The planetarium and digital theatre covers 3,000 square metres (32,000 sq ft). Shows last around 30 minutes. It is open to the public on weekends and holidays.
