= 2021 Minas Gerais prostitute strike =

Labor dispute in Brazil

- Date: April 2021 (Note: Sources are unclear as to the length, start date, and end date of the strike. Work stoppage by prostitutes in Minas Gerais was reported on as early as April 1 in an article in O Tempo. News agency Agence France-Presse reported on April 7 that the workers had "gone on strike for a week". This week-long strike claim is also stated in an article from The Nigerian News, but that article gives an explicit start date for the strike as April 5.)
- Location: Minas Gerais, Brazil
- Goals: Categorization of sex workers as a priority group for COVID-19 vaccination
- Result: Strike fails to pressure Ministry of Health into classifying sex workers as a priority group

Parties
Associação das Prostitutas de Minas Gerais (Aprosmig, transl. Association of Prostitutes of Minas Gerais)

The 2021 Minas Gerais prostitute strike was a labor strike involving several thousand prostitutes in Minas Gerais, Brazil. The strike was organized by the Associação das Prostitutas de Minas Gerais (Aprosmig; transl. Association of Prostitutes of Minas Gerais) and ran for about a week in early April. Occurring during the COVID-19 pandemic, the goal of the strike was to pressure the Ministry of Health into categorizing sex workers among other priority groups for immunization against COVID-19. Several protests occurred in the state's capital city of Belo Horizonte. Despite the strike, the Ministry of Health did not add sex workers as a priority group for vaccines.

== Background ==
Throughout 2021, the COVID-19 pandemic continued in Brazil, with March of that year being one of the worst months for the pandemic. Sex workers were especially hard hit by the effects of the pandemic, with many of them reducing or outright suspending their activities as a result. In the state of Minas Gerais at this time, approximately 80,000 prostitutes were members of the Associação das Prostitutas de Minas Gerais (Aprosmig, transl. Association of Prostitutes of Minas Gerais), with the capital city of Belo Horizonte home to 3,500 of these members. While financial and health assistance was provided to some degree by both the city of Belo Horizonte and through donations, many prostitutes continued to work due to financial needs, and many have contracted COVID-19 as a result. However, after many hotels in downtown Belo Horizonte were closed as part of a lockdown starting on March 17, approximately 3,000 sex workers lost a place to do business.

== Course of the strike ==
On April 1, it was reported in the Minas Gerais-based newspaper O Tempo that sex workers throughout the state were performing a work stoppage. Cida Vieira, the president of Aprosmig, stated that the goal of the strike was to pressure municipal, state, and federal governments into adding sex workers as a priority group for vaccinations against COVID-19. Vieira stated that, prior to the strike, she had requested that the governments of Minas Gerais and Belo Horizonte add sex workers as a priority group, with both entities claiming that they were subordinate to the vaccination plan laid out by the federal Ministry of Health, which did not include sex workers among its priority groups. According to Vieira, the work stoppage was supported by the Rede Brasileira de Prostitutas (RBP, transl. Brazilian Network of Prostitutes) and multiple other state-based prostitute organizations. Speaking of the push to be classified as a priority group, Vieira said, "Our work is for daily physical contact and with several people. We are very vulnerable and we had to be included in some risk group. We don't want them to pass us in front of anyone, but to see us with the eyes of humanity". In addition to Aprosmig, the equivalent state organization in the nearby state of Bahia also chose to call for a work stoppage, though an April 3 article in the Bahia-based newspaper Correio reported that very few prostitutes in the state chose to participate, citing the need to continue to bring in money. Aprosmig stated that the strike would continue until they were guaranteed vaccinations for sex workers, who they argued qualified as frontline workers.

On April 5, several striking sex workers protested along Rua Guaicurus, one of the main thoroughfares in Belo Horizonte. On April 7, a protest in Belo Horizonte almost turned violent after a confrontation between protestors and police. In total, the strike lasted about a week, but in the end, the Ministry of Health did not add sex workers to their list of priority groups.

== See also ==
- 2021 Brazilian protests
- Strikes during the COVID-19 pandemic
