= Instituto Questão de Ciência =

Brazilian non-profit organisation promoting science and critical thinking

- Established: November 22, 2018
- Focus: * Combating the National Policy of Integrative and Complementary Practices * Popularizing science * Promoting critical thinking * Promoting scientific skepticism * Combating pseudosciences
- President: Natália Pasternak Taschner
- Website: iqc.org.br

The Instituto Questão de Ciência (IQC) (English: Science Question Institute) is a Brazilian non-profit organisation founded in 2018, dedicated to the promotion of scientific and critical thinking and the use of scientific evidence in public policies.

== Goals ==
One of the primary focuses of the IQC is opposition to the spending of public funds on forms of treatment that are either ineffective or without scientific proof, as is done through the Política Nacional de Práticas Integrativas e Complementares (National Policy of Integrative and Complementary Practices) in Brazil. The IQC seeks to convince the Brazilian government to stop financing such practices through the united health system, Sistema Único de Saúde (SUS). Other themes that motivated the creation of the institute include the phosphorylethanolamine fiasco (during which the drug was distributed in capsules by a professor at USP with the unverified claims that it would treat different types of cancer) and the invasion by anti-animal testing activists of the Royal Institute's laboratories in São Roque in 2013, as well as controversies involving genetic heritage and food labeling.

The IQC list as their focus points science education, scientific journalism and the skeptical movement.

== Formation ==
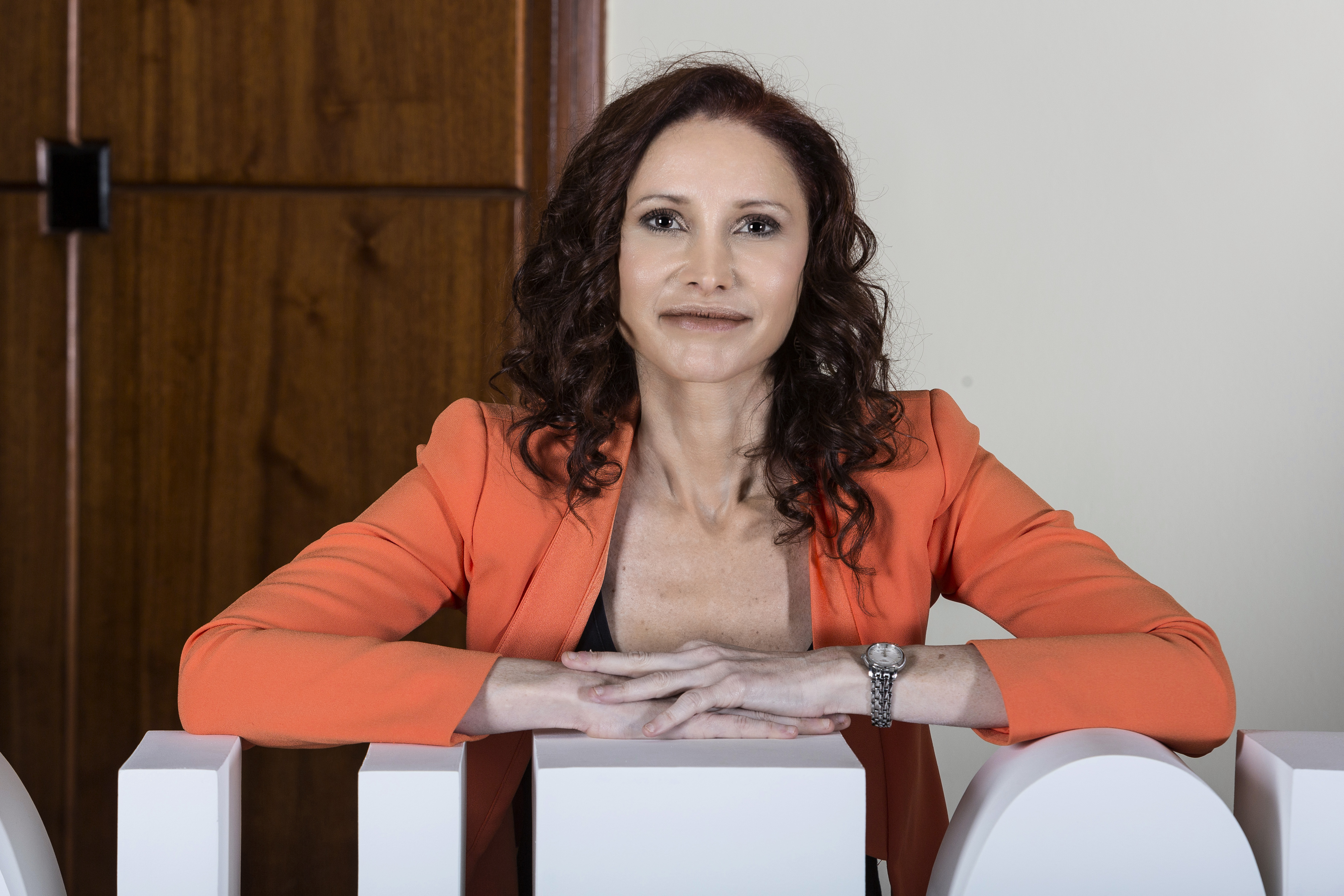
Natália Pasternak Taschner, founder and president of IQC

The launch of the IQC took place on November 22, 2018, in São Paulo, at an event that included a lecture by British physician Edzard Ernst, an expert in the analysis of evidence about alternative therapies. Since its launch, the institute has received expressions of support from the Brazilian and international scientific community. Drauzio Varella, Paulo Saldiva, Marcelo Knobel and other Brazilian scientists expressed support for the creation of the institute, in addition to skeptic James Randi, Edzard Ernst and other personalities in the world scientific dissemination.

== Board ==
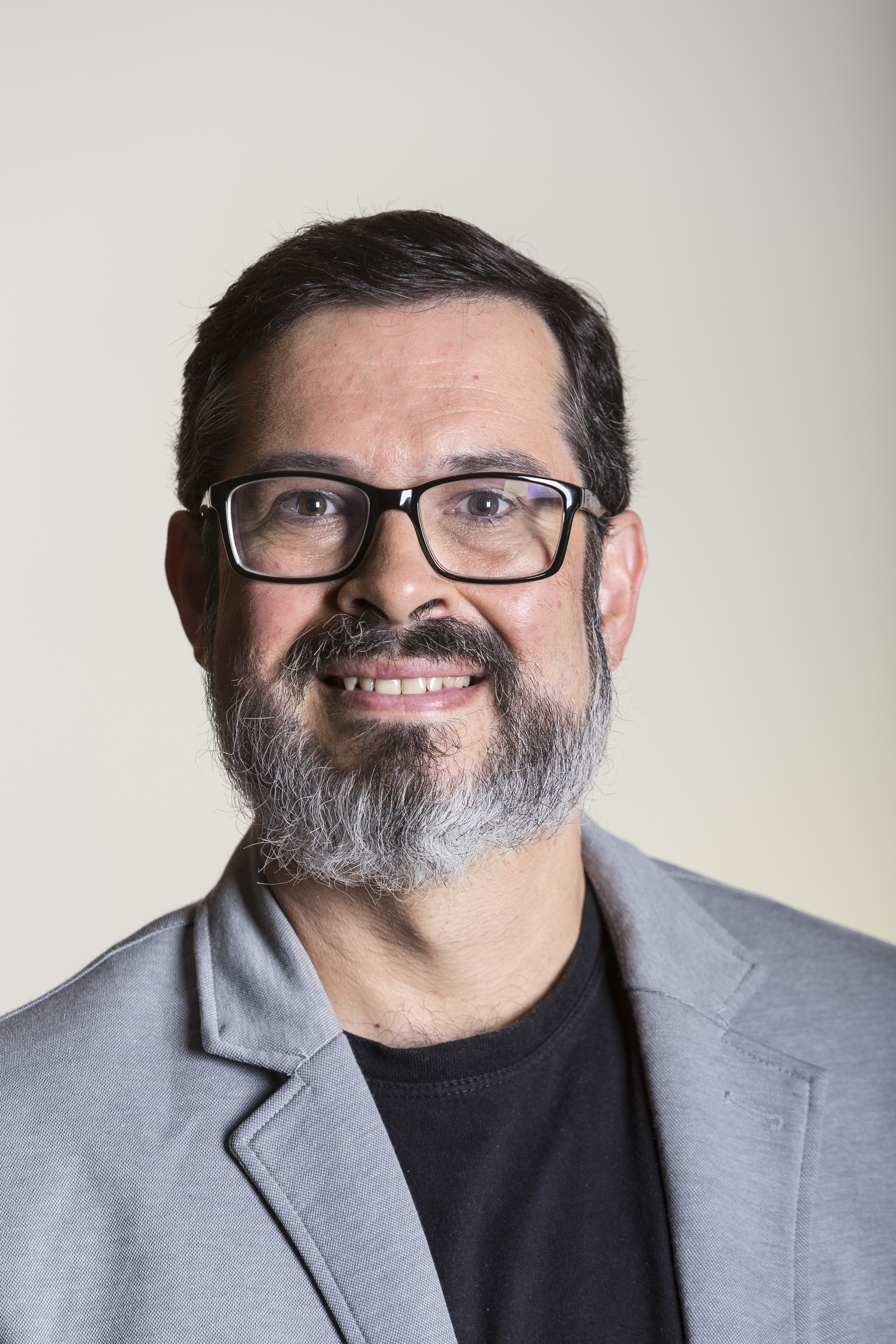
Carlos Orsi, founder and communication director of IQC, editor-in-chief of Revista Questão de Ciência

Until December 2019, the IQC board was composed of its founding members:

- Natália Pasternak Taschner – President
- Marcelo T. Yamashita – Director of Science
- Carlos Orsi – Director of Communications
- Paulo Almeida – Chief Financial Officer
