= Professor Aristóteles Orsini Planetarium =

Planetarium in Brazil

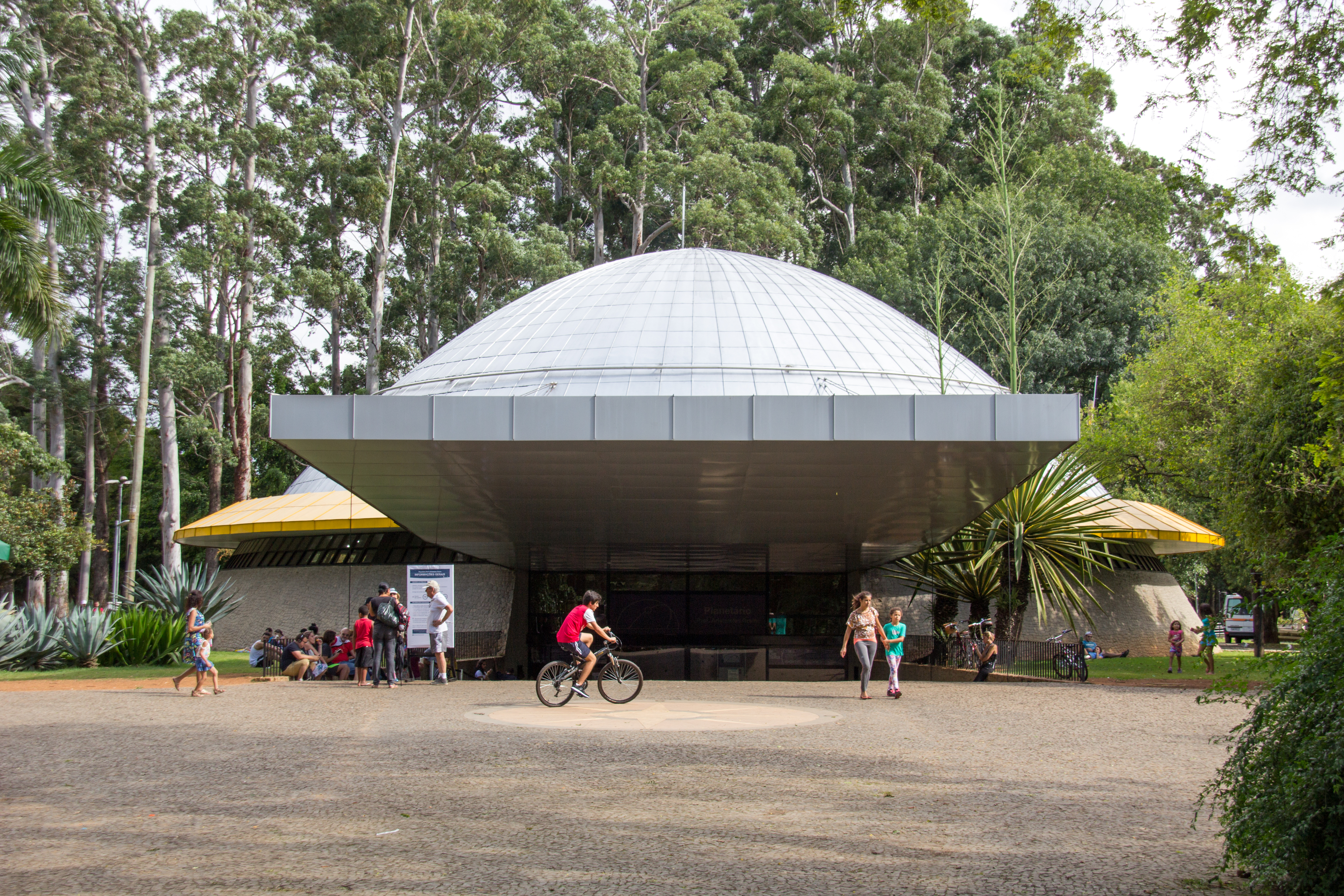
- The Professor Aristóteles Orsini Planetarium
- Location: São Paulo
- Coordinates: 23°35′04″S 46°39′39″W
- Website: http://www.parquedoibirapuera.com/atracoes/planetario-ibirapuera/

The Professor Aristóteles Orsini Planetarium (Portuguese: Planetário Professor Aristóteles Orsini), also known as the Ibirapuera Planetarium (Portuguese: Planetário do Ibirapuera), is a planetarium in Ibirapuera Park, São Paulo. It opened in January 1957, and was the first planetarium in Brazil and Latin America. It is one of three planetaria in São Paulo, with the others being Carmo Planetarium and the Johannes Kepler Planetarium at Sabina Escola Parque do Conhecimento.

== History ==
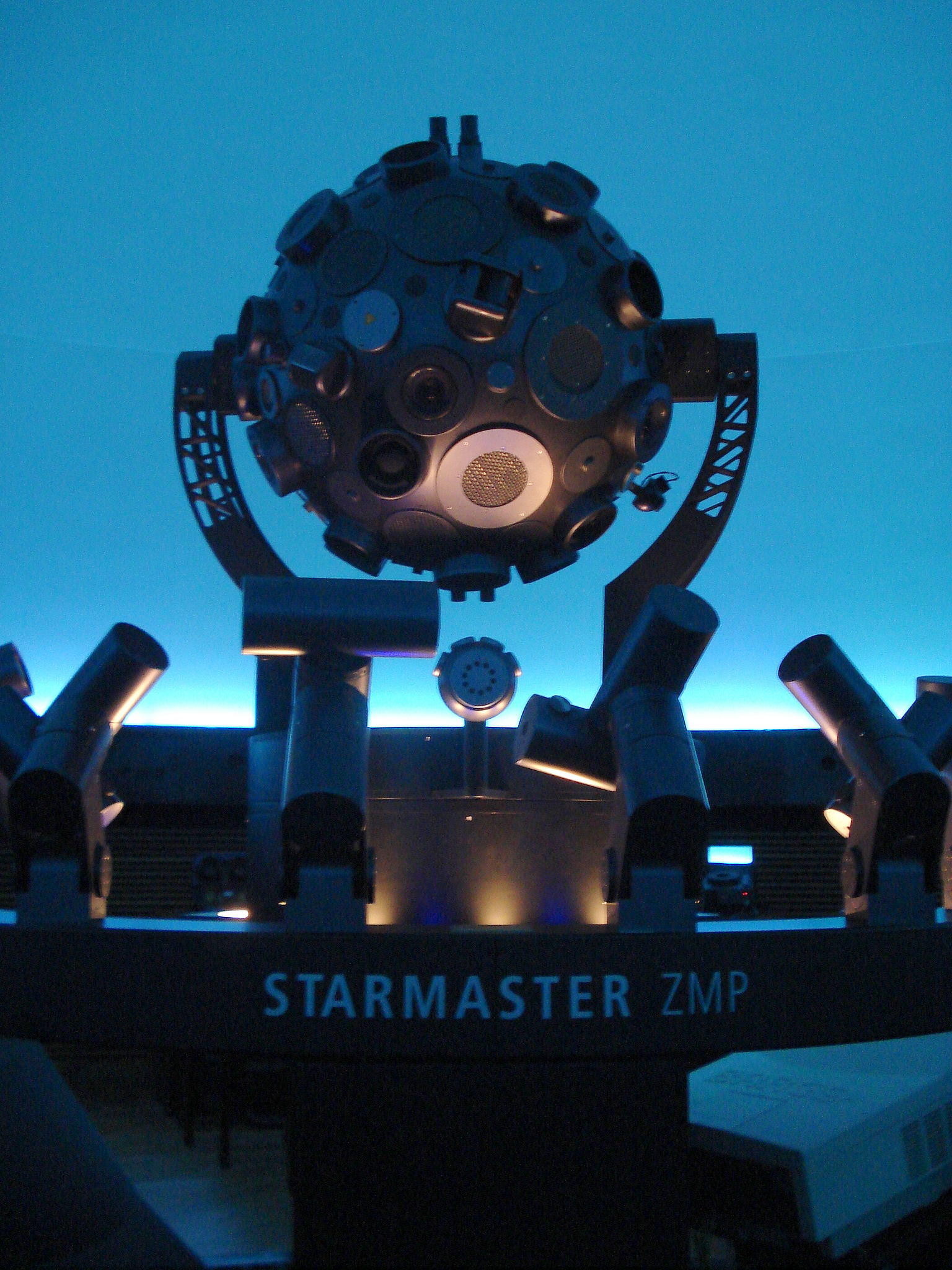
The projector in the theatre

The planetarium was proposed in 1951 by Aristóteles Orsini, then director of the Associação dos Amadores de Astronomia de São Paulo, as part of the 400th anniversary celebrations of the foundation of São Paulo. A Zeiss projector was then purchased, at a cost of ₢$3,000,000 (including transportation; 1952 values), arriving at the Port of Santos by 29 May 1952. Also in 1952, Orsini was commissioned to study the installation of the projector in a planetarium in the city, for which he visited Urania Sternwarte, Switzerland, and interned at the planetarium at Palais de la Découverte, Paris; he then recommended the creation of a science Museum in the same style as that in Paris, with the planetarium attached, which was never realised.

The architects of the final building were Antonio Carlos, Eduardo Corona and Roberto G. Tibau Pitombo, and was constructed by Construtora Politécnica Ltda.

By the time of the 400th anniversary, the planetarium was still being constructed, and the projector was being held by customs in Santos; it wasn't released until June 1955, when it was subsequently placed into storage in Viveiro Manequinho Lopes in Ibirapuera Park. By the end of 1956 the construction of the building was completed, three years behind the initial schedule. This delay caused the cost of the originally-planned metal dome to soar from ₢$700,000 to ₢$5,000,000 due to exchange rate fluctuations, far in excess of the budget for it. As a result, José Carlos Figueiredo Ferraz designed and installed a concrete projection dome instead, which was the first time such material had been used for this type of structure.

The planetarium opened on 26 January 1957, at which time it was the only planetarium in Brazil; it was opened by Orsini, who subsequently led the initial operation of the planetarium, at the invitation of Maury de Freitas Julião and Wladimir de Toledo Pizza Sobrinho.

The historical building is recorded by the Conselho Municipal de Preservação do Patrimônio Histórico, Cultural e Ambiental da Cidade de São Paulo (Conpresp; 1997) and Conselho de Defesa do Patrimônio Histórico, Arqueológico, Artístico e Turístico (Condephaat; 1992).

It closed in 1995–1997. In 1999 the building was closed by structural problems resulting in a roof leak, as well as a termite infestation. It was restored at a cost of R$9.6 million, re-opening on 22 September 2006. During the restoration, led by Carl Zeiss AG, modern projectors were installed.

The planetarium closed in May 2013 for renovation after a lightning strike damaged the projector. It reopened on 24 January 2016, a day before the city's anniversary.

== Planetarium ==
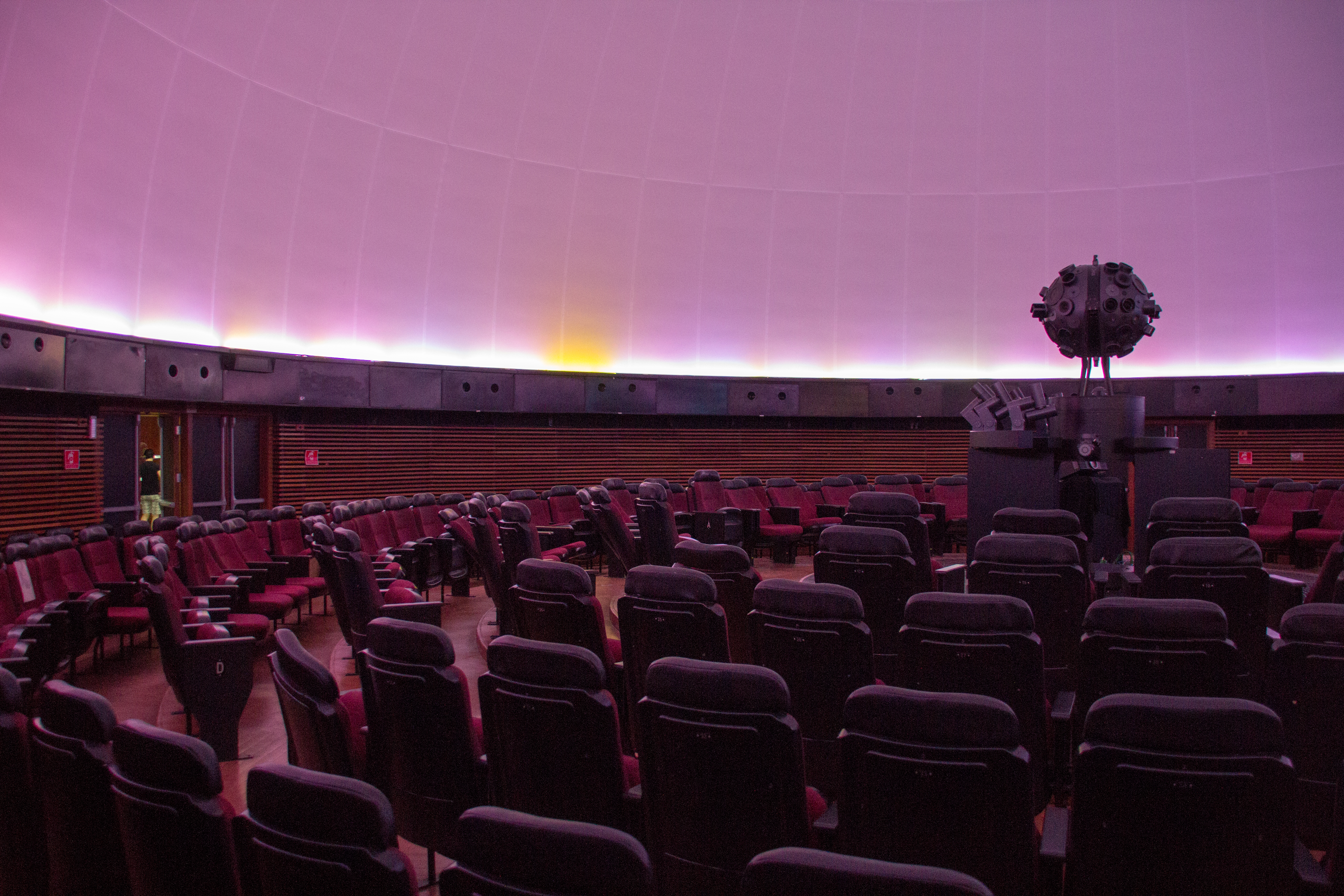
Inside the planetarium

The planetarium uses a Starmaster projector, manufactured by Carl Zeiss AG, which was installed in 2006 to replace the original Universarium III purchased in 1952. 44 additional projectors are also used. The projection dome has a capacity of 300 people, with a circular arrangement of reclining seats and projection at the top of the dome. The dome spans 18 metres (59 ft), and is on one floor with a mezzanine. The metal and concrete half-dome is surrounded by a yellow disk, and the interior is made of wood.

Planetarium shows last 30 minutes. The planetarium is open to pre-arranged school visits on Wednesdays, Thursdays and Fridays. It opens to the general public on Saturdays, Sundays, some holidays, and some weekdays in summer months via a ticket system, with 256 tickets available to the general public and 52 tickets reserved for disabled, pregnant, elderly or obese people and companions, with seven wheelchair spaces. In the 1990s it received around 350,000 visitors per year.

The planetarium is located around 5 minutes walk from the pedestrian Gate 10 of Ibirapuera Park, and is near to car parking at Gate 3.

== Municipal School of Astronomy ==
Adjacent to the planetarium is the Municipal School of Astronomy (Portuguese: Escola Municipal de Astrofísica Professor Aristóteles Orsini). It opened in January 1961 to teach astronomy courses, due to demand from the planetarium, which opened four years earlier. It has three classrooms, as well as a 100-seat auditorium. Courses range from introductory astronomy; solar system astronomy; stellar evolution; and cosmology. There is also an exhibition room, a reading room, and a telescope-building room.
