= Pint of Science =

Annual science festival

- Global Science Festival
- Founded: September 2012
- Founder: Dr. Praveen Paul and Dr. Michael Motskin
- Type: Non-profit organisation
- Region served: UK, Worldwide
- Volunteers: >2000
- Website: pintofscience.com

Pint of Science is an annual science festival that aims to communicate contemporary scientific developments to the public by bringing scientists to pubs, cafés and other public places to share their research and findings.

It is mainly organised and run by volunteer postgraduate or postdoctoral researchers, lecturers and public engagement staff who are based at universities or research institutions.

The festival takes place annually in the month of May and covers all aspects of research which are themed under the titles 'Beautiful Mind', 'Atoms to Galaxies', 'Our Body', 'Planet Earth', 'Tech Me Out', 'Our Society' and art-science events 'Creative Reactions'.

Each May, thousands of researchers across more than 600 cities and 25 countries share and discuss their findings with people. Due to the COVID-19 pandemic, the 2020 and part of the 2021 Pint of Science festival took place online.

== History ==
Pint of Science has its roots in a 2012 initiative by a group of UK based postgraduate and postdoctoral researchers. Festival founders Dr. Michael Motskin and Dr. Praveen Paul were then researching different neurodegenerative conditions at Imperial College London and thought that there was a gap between their research efforts and what motivated them. In addition, when discussing their work with friends, especially some of the new techniques being used, such as nanoparticle delivery of drugs to the brain, their friends thought it sounded like science fiction. They felt that it was important to show how scientists conduct research, especially to the individuals and families affected by the conditions that they were working on.

In September 2012, they organised 'Meet the Researchers', an event that brought people affected by Parkinson's, Alzheimer's, motor neuron disease, and multiple sclerosis into their labs so that they could see the research being carried out there. They said afterwards: "The guests were fascinated by the approaches being used to try to understand the biological basis of these afflictions and by the latest developments in both basic research and translational efforts. This event was inspirational to everyone involved - researchers and visitors alike. We thought that, if people want to come to labs to meet scientists, why not bring scientists to people? This was the birth of Pint of Science." After running the first festival in May 2013 in three cities, Pint of Science received many emails from people wanting to join the festival - both around the UK and the rest of the world.

== Event format ==
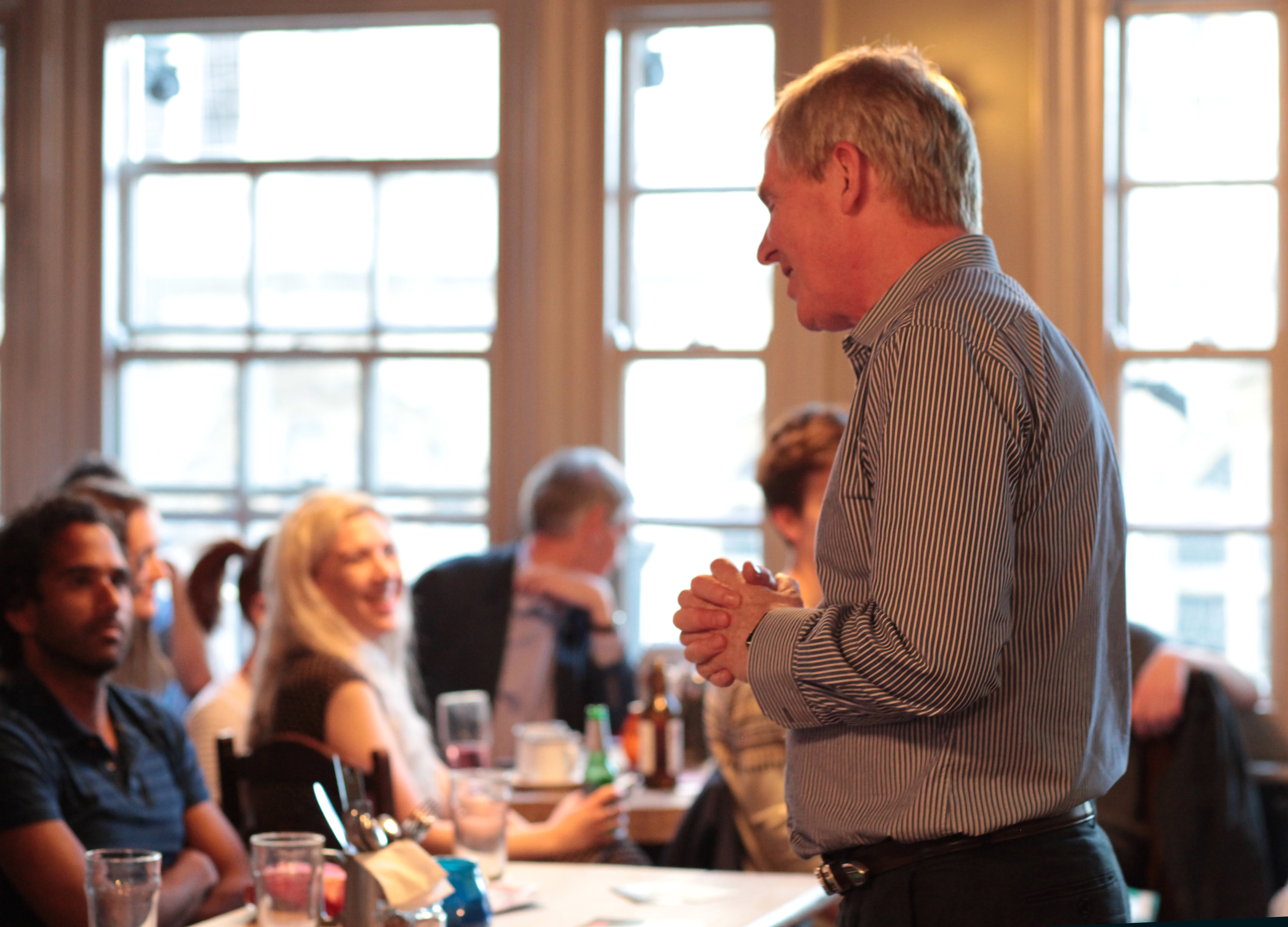
Pint of Science talk

There is no fixed format and freedom is given to the local organisers for how events are run. Rather than a series of formal talks, Pint of Science aims to recreate the buzz of popular music festivals, offering multiple stages across each city that allow leading experts in various scientific fields to present, discuss and take questions on their latest discoveries and research with members of the public. The events aim to have an interactive element, from demonstrations to quizzes, entertainment or robots.

Some events combine art and science and are called Creative Reactions. The UK Cambridge Pint of Science team started Creative Reactions as a collaboration between artists and Pint of Science scientists to produce artworks related to the science presented at the talks. They matched artists with their 50 speakers in Pint of Science Cambridge. The artists create a unique piece of art based on their interpretations of the scientific subjects in various forms of art such as illustrations, painting, jewellery, screen-printing, film, dance and more. The result of the collaboration was displayed in the very first Creative Reactions exhibition at the end of the 2015 festival, which had over 700 visitors in Cambridge. Creative Reactions exhibitions and performances have since expanded to further cities in the UK.

== International ==
In just its second year (2014), the Pint of Science festival expanded to include Australia, France, Ireland, Switzerland and the US, with all countries holding the events over the same three days.

Élodie Chabrol took part in the creation of the festival in London in 2013, and in 2014 went on to create the French branch of the festival which she is still managing. Since 2017 Élodie Chabrol has also been international director and has worked to include more than 20 new countries, spread all over the world across hundreds of cities. The aims and purposes can differ between countries, but they all work together to deliver the festival on the same dates. The largest Pint of Science country in terms of number of cities hosting the festival is Brazil, which had over 120 cities participating in 2023.

== Awards ==
Pint of Science was awarded Points of Light by UK Prime Minister David Cameron in November 2015 and the founders were interviewed about it on London Live television. Imperial College London awarded Pint of Science the "President's Inspirational Partner Award for Excellence in Societal Engagement" in June 2017. In 2019 Pint of Science received an award in the University of Oxford's Vice-Chancellor's Public Engagement with Research Awards under the 'Building Capacity' category. In November 2019, Pint of Science won a University of Lincoln Public Engagement with Research Award.
