= Sustainable Development Goal 2 =

Global goal to end hunger by 2030

- Mission statement: "End hunger, achieve food security and improved nutrition, and promote sustainable agriculture"
- Commercial?: No
- Type of project: Non-Profit
- Location: Global
- Founder: United Nations
- Established: 2015
- Website: sdgs.un.org

The Sustainable Development Goal 2 (abbr. SDG 2 or Global Goal 2) aims to achieve "zero hunger". It is one of the 17 Sustainable Development Goals established by the United Nations in 2015. The official wording is: "End hunger, achieve food security and improved nutrition and promote sustainable agriculture". SDG 2 highlights the "complex inter-linkages between food security, nutrition, rural transformation and sustainable agriculture". According to the United Nations, there were up to 757 million people facing hunger in 2023 – one out of 11 people in the world, which accounts for slightly less than 10 percent of the world population. One in every nine people goes to bed hungry each night, including 20 million people currently at risk of famine in South Sudan, Somalia, Yemen and Nigeria.

SDG 2 has eight targets and 14 indicators to measure progress. The five outcome targets are: ending hunger and improving access to food; ending all forms of malnutrition; agricultural productivity; sustainable food production systems and resilient agricultural practices; and genetic diversity of seeds, cultivated plants and farmed and domesticated animals; investments, research and technology. The three means of implementation targets include addressing trade restrictions and distortions in world agricultural markets and food trade markets and their derivatives.

After falling for decades, under-nutrition rose after 2015, with causes including various stresses in food systems such as climate shocks, the locust crisis and the COVID-19 pandemic. Those threats indirectly reduced the purchasing power and the capacity to produce and distribute food, which affects the most vulnerable populations and furthermore has reduced their accessibility to food.

While the world was witnessing a gradual decline in under-nutrition in 2023, the double burden of malnutrition – defined as the co-existence of undernutrition together with overweight and obesity – has been on the rise over the last two decades, characterized by a sharp increase in obesity rates and with only a gradual decline in thinness and underweight. Underweight among adults and the elderly has been cut in half while obesity is on the rise in all age groups.

The world is not on track to achieve Zero Hunger by 2030. "The signs of increasing hunger and food insecurity are a warning that there is considerable work to be done to make sure the world "leaves no one behind" on the road towards a world with zero hunger." It is unlikely there will be an end to malnutrition in Africa by 2030.

Data from 2019 showed that "globally, 1 in 9 people are undernourished, the vast majority of whom live in developing countries. Under nutrition causes wasting or severe wasting of 52 million children worldwide".

== Background ==
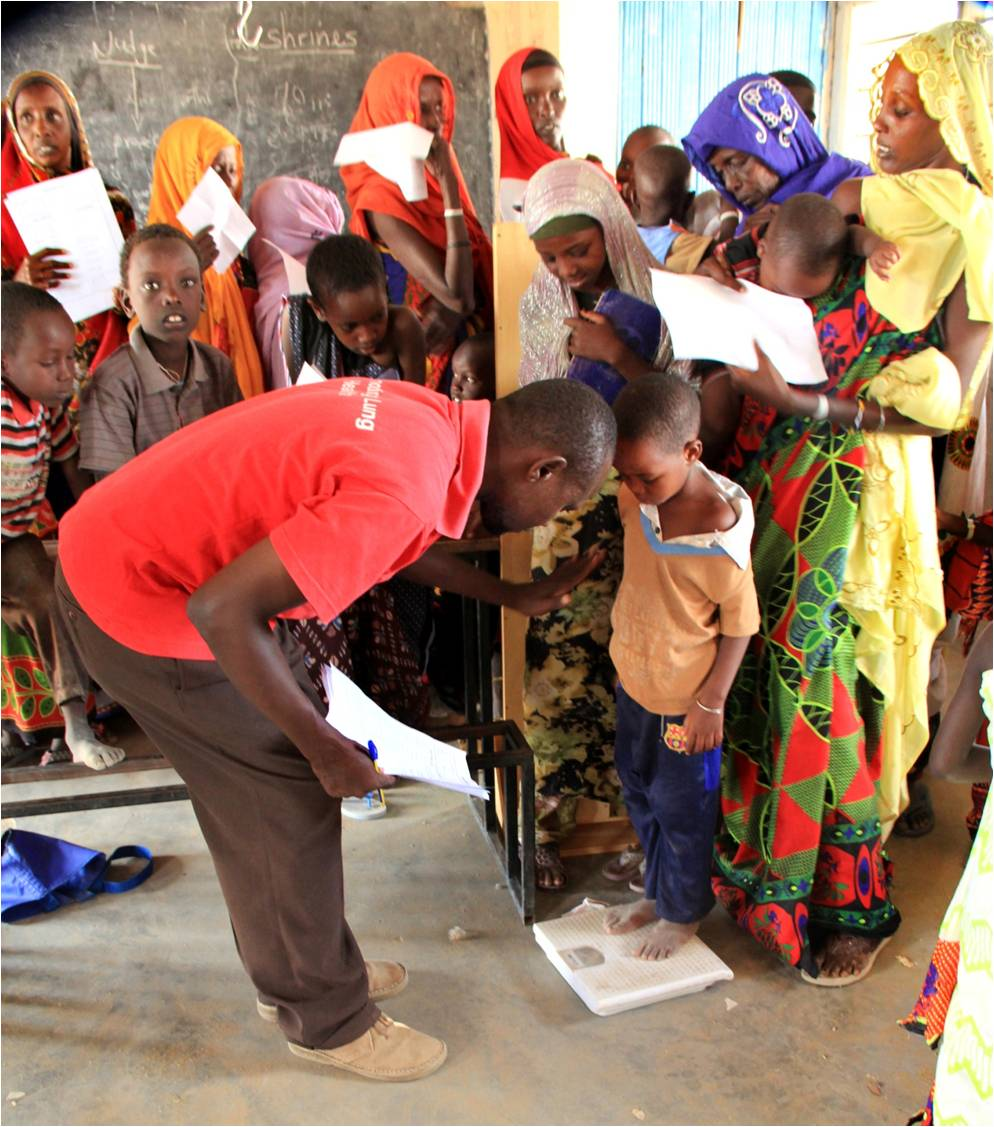
Kenyan health worker weighs a young Kenyan boy to determine if he is malnourished

In September 2015, the General Assembly adopted the 2030 Agenda for Sustainable Development that included 17 Sustainable Development Goals (SDGs). Building on the principle of "leaving no one behind", the new Agenda emphasizes a holistic approach to achieving sustainable development for all. In September 2019, Heads of State and Government came together during the SDG Summit to renew their commitment to implement the 2030 Agenda for Sustainable Development. During this event, they acknowledged some progress had been made, but that overall, "the world is not on track to deliver the SDGs". This is when "the decade of action" and "delivery for sustainable development" was launched, demanding stakeholders to speed up the process and efforts of implementation.

SDG 2 aims to end all forms of malnutrition and hunger by 2030 and ensure that everyone has sufficient food throughout the year, especially children. Chronic malnutrition, which affects an estimated 155 million children worldwide, also stunts children's brain and physical development and puts them at further risk of death, disease, and lack of success as adults. Hungry people are less productive and easily prone to diseases. As such, they will be unable to improve their livelihood.

Innovations in agriculture are meant to ensure increase in food production and subsequent decrease in food loss and food waste.

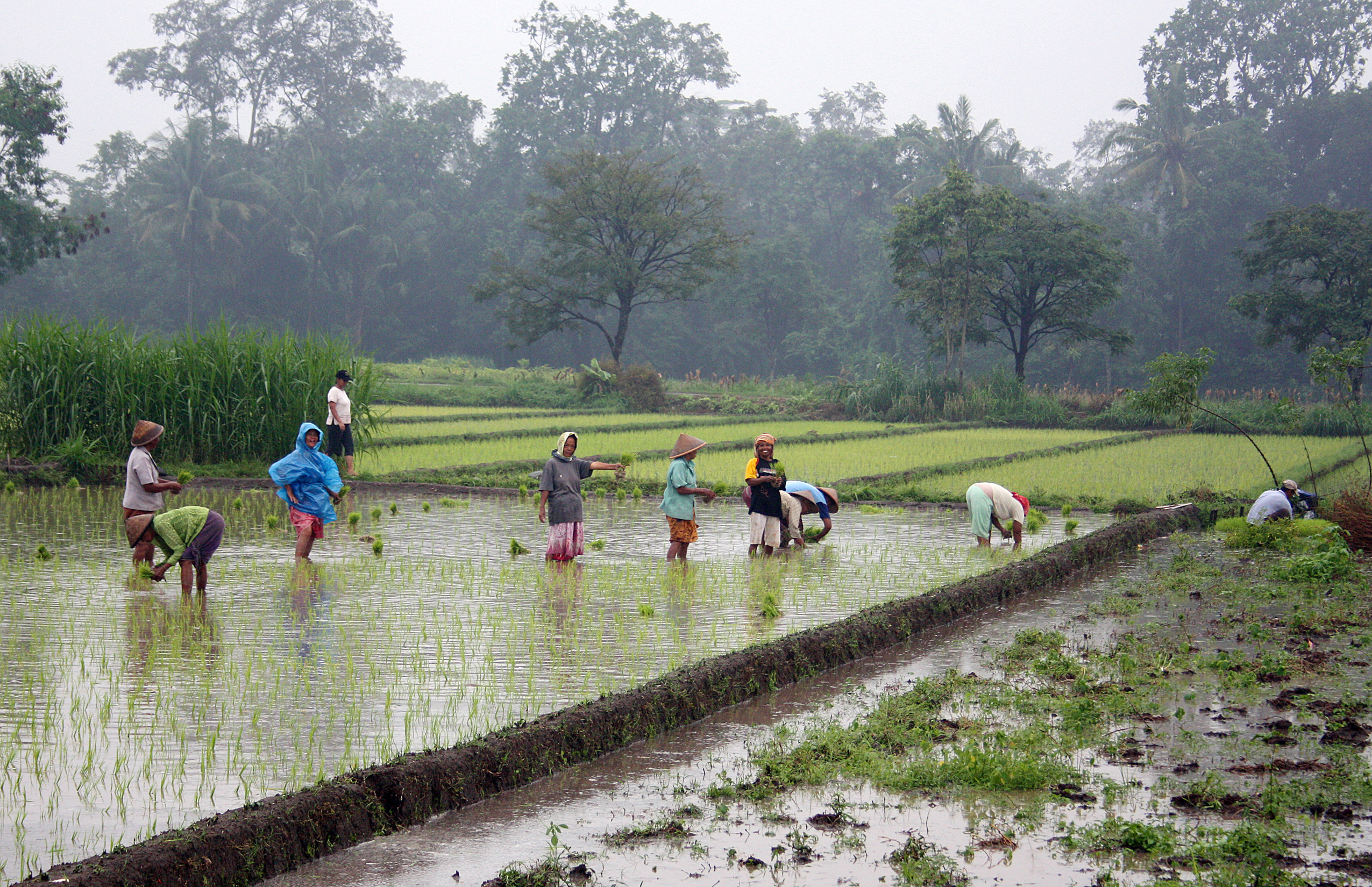
Javanese women performing manual labor during rice plantation in Indonesia

A report by the International Food Policy Research Institute (IFPRI) of 2013 stated that the emphasis of the SDGs should not be on ending poverty by 2030, but on eliminating hunger and under-nutrition by 2025. The assertion is based on an analysis of experiences in China, Vietnam, Brazil, and Thailand. Three pathways to achieve this were identified: 1) agriculture-led; 2) social protection- and nutrition- intervention-led; or 3) a combination of both of these approaches.

== Targets, indicators and progress ==
The UN has defined 8 targets and 13 indicators for SDG 2. Four of them are to be achieved by the year 2030, one by the year 2020 and three have no target years. Each of the targets also has one or more indicators to measure progress. In total there are fourteen indicators for SDG 2. The eight targets include ending hunger and increasing access to food (2.1), ending all forms of malnutrition (2.2), agricultural productivity (2.3), sustainable food production systems and resilient agricultural practices (2.4), genetic diversity of seeds, cultivated plants and farmed and domesticated animals (2.5), investments, research and technology (2.a), trade restrictions and distortions in world agricultural markets (2.b) and food commodity markets and their derivatives (2.c).

=== Target 2.1: Universal access to safe and nutritious food ===
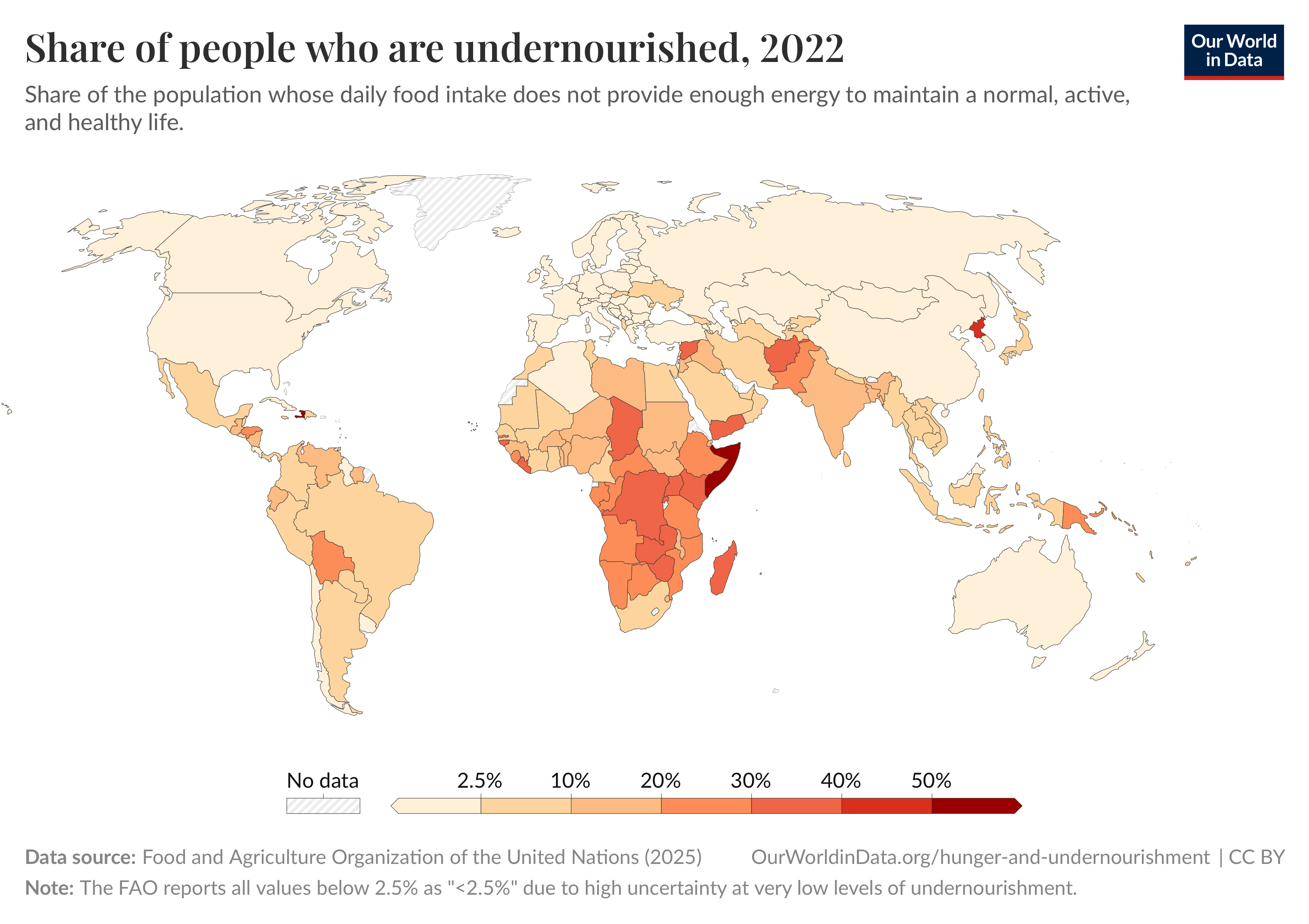
World map for Indicator 2.1.1 in 2022: Share of population who are undernourished

The first target of SDG 2 is Target 2.1: "By 2030 end hunger and ensure access by all people, in particular the poor and people in vulnerable situations including infants, to safe, nutritious and sufficient food all year round".

It has two indicators:

- Indicator 2.1.1: Prevalence of undernourishment.
- Indicator 2.1.2: Prevalence of moderate or severe food insecurity in the population, based on the Food Insecurity Experience Scale (FIES).

Food insecurity is defined by the UN FAO as the "situation when people lack secure access to sufficient amounts of safe and nutritious food for normal growth and development and an active and healthy life". The UN's FAO uses the prevalence of undernourishment as the main hunger indicator.

=== Target 2.2: End all forms of malnutrition ===
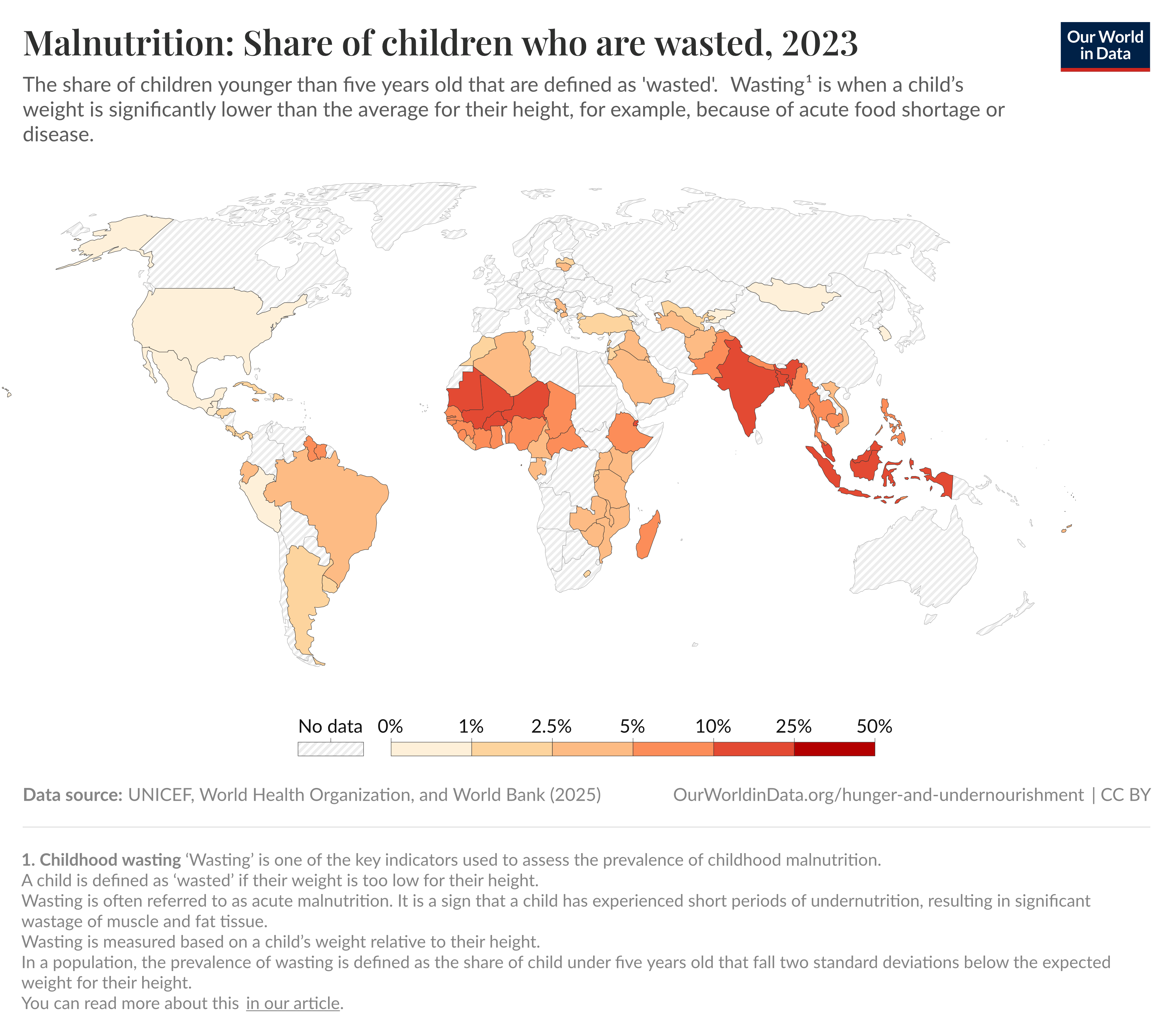
World Map for Indicator 2.2.2 - Share of children with a weight too low for their height (wasting)

The full title of Target 2.2 is: "By 2030 end all forms of malnutrition, including achieving by 2025 the international agreed targets on stunting and wasting in children under five years of age, and address the nutritional needs of adolescent girls, pregnant and lactating women, and older persons."

It has two indicators:

- Indicator 2.2.1: Prevalence of stunting (height for age <-2 standard deviation from the median of the World Health Organization (WHO) Child Growth Standards) among children under 5 years of age)".
- Indicator 2.2.2: Prevalence of malnutrition (weight for height >+2 or <-2 standard deviation from the median of the WHO Child Growth Standards).

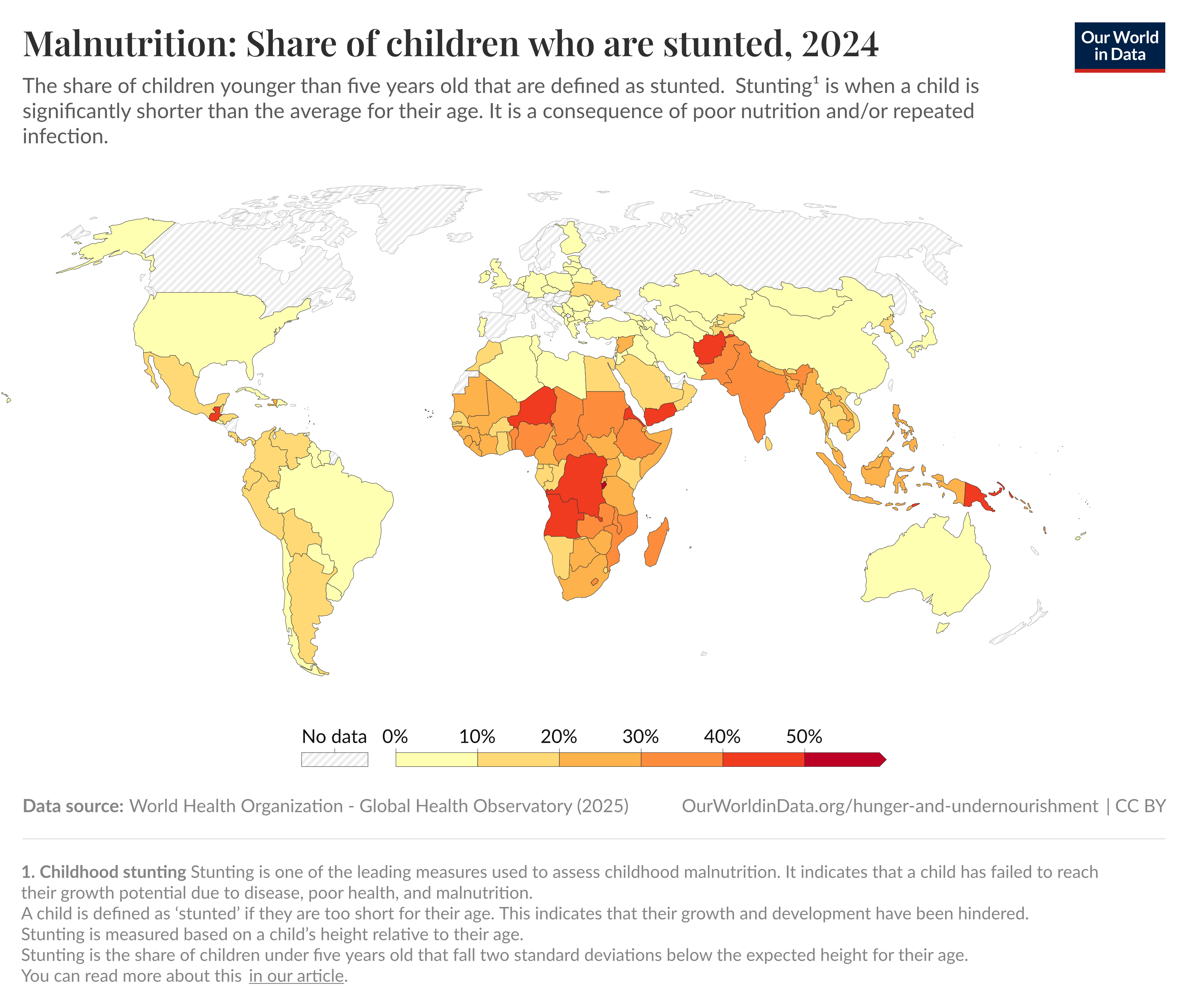
World map for indicator 2.2.1 in 2024: Share of children who are stunted

Stunted children are determined as having a height which falls below the median height-for-age of the World Health Organization's Child Growth Standards. A child is defined as "wasted" if their weight-for-height is more than two standard deviations below the median of the WHO Child Growth Standards. A child is defined as "overweight" if their weight-for-height is more than two standard deviations above the median of the WHO Child Growth Standards.

Stunting is an indicator of severe malnutrition. The impacts of stunting on child development are considered to be irreversible beyond the first 1000 days of a child's life. Stunting can have severe impacts on both cognitive and physical development throughout a person's life.

The 2017 High-level Political Forum on Sustainable Development (HLPF) Thematic review of SDG 2 reviewed progress made and predicted that there will be 130 million stunted children by 2025. Currently, there are: "59 million children that are stunted in Africa, 87 million in Asia, 6 million in Latin America, and the remaining 3 million in Oceania and developed countries."

More people are experiencing overweight and obesity problems in low- and middle-income countries.

=== Target 2.3: Double the productivity and incomes of small-scale food producers ===
The full title for Target 2.3: "By 2030 double the agricultural productivity and the incomes of small-scale food producers, particularly women, indigenous peoples, family farmers, pastoralists and fishers, including through secure and equal access to land, other productive resources and inputs, knowledge, financial services, markets, and opportunities for value addition and non-farm employment".

It has two indicators:

Agriculture value added per worker, 2017

- Indicator 2.3.1: The volume of production per labour unit by classes of farming/pastoral/forestry enterprise size.
- Indicator 2.3.2: Average income of small-scale food producers, by sex and indigenous status.

Small-scale producers have is systematically lower production than larger food producers. In most countries, small-scale food producers earn less than half those of larger food producers. It is too early to determine the progress done on this SDG. According to statistics division of the department of Economic and Social Affairs at the UN, the share of small-scale producers among all food producers in Africa, Asia and Latin America ranges from 40% to 85%.

This target connects to Sustainable Development Goal 5 (Gender Equality). According to National Geographic, the pay gap between men and women in the agriculture field averages at 20-30%. When the incomes of small-scale food producers are not affected by whether the farmer is female or where they are from, farmers will be able to increase their financial stability. Being more financially stable means doubling the productivity of food. Closing the gender gap could feed 130 million people out of the 870 million undernourished people in the world. Gender equality in agriculture is essential to helping achieve zero hunger.

=== Target 2.4: Sustainable food production and resilient agricultural practices ===
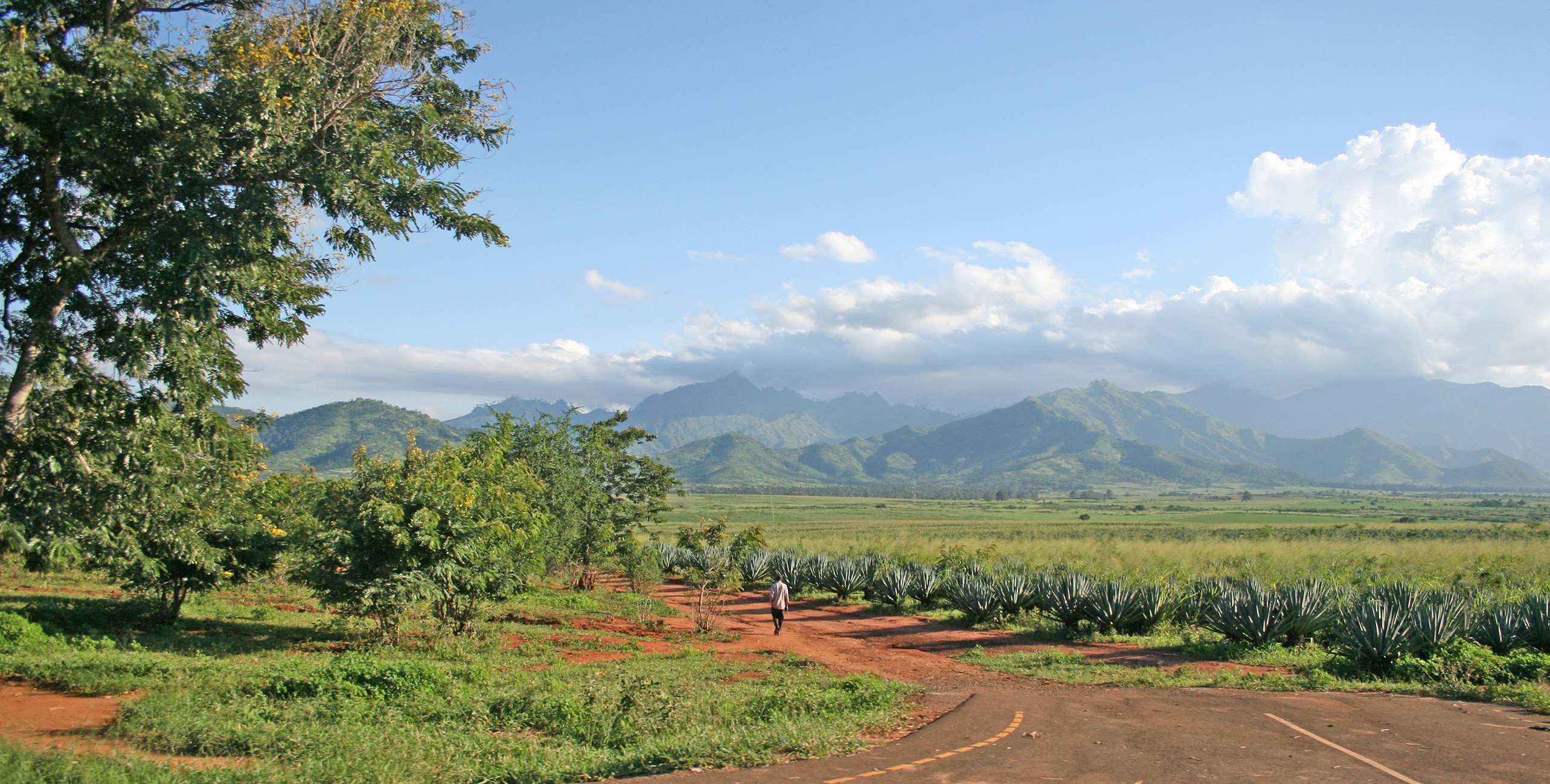
Sisal plantations in the outskirts of Morogoro, Tanzania

The full title for Target 2.4: "By 2030 ensure sustainable food production systems and implement resilient agricultural practices that increase productivity and production, that help maintain ecosystems, that strengthen capacity for adaptation to climate change, extreme weather, drought, flooding and other disasters, and that progressively improve land and soil quality".

This target has one indicator:

- Indicator 2.4.1: Proportion of agricultural area under productive and sustainable agriculture".

=== Target 2.5: Maintain the genetic diversity in food production ===
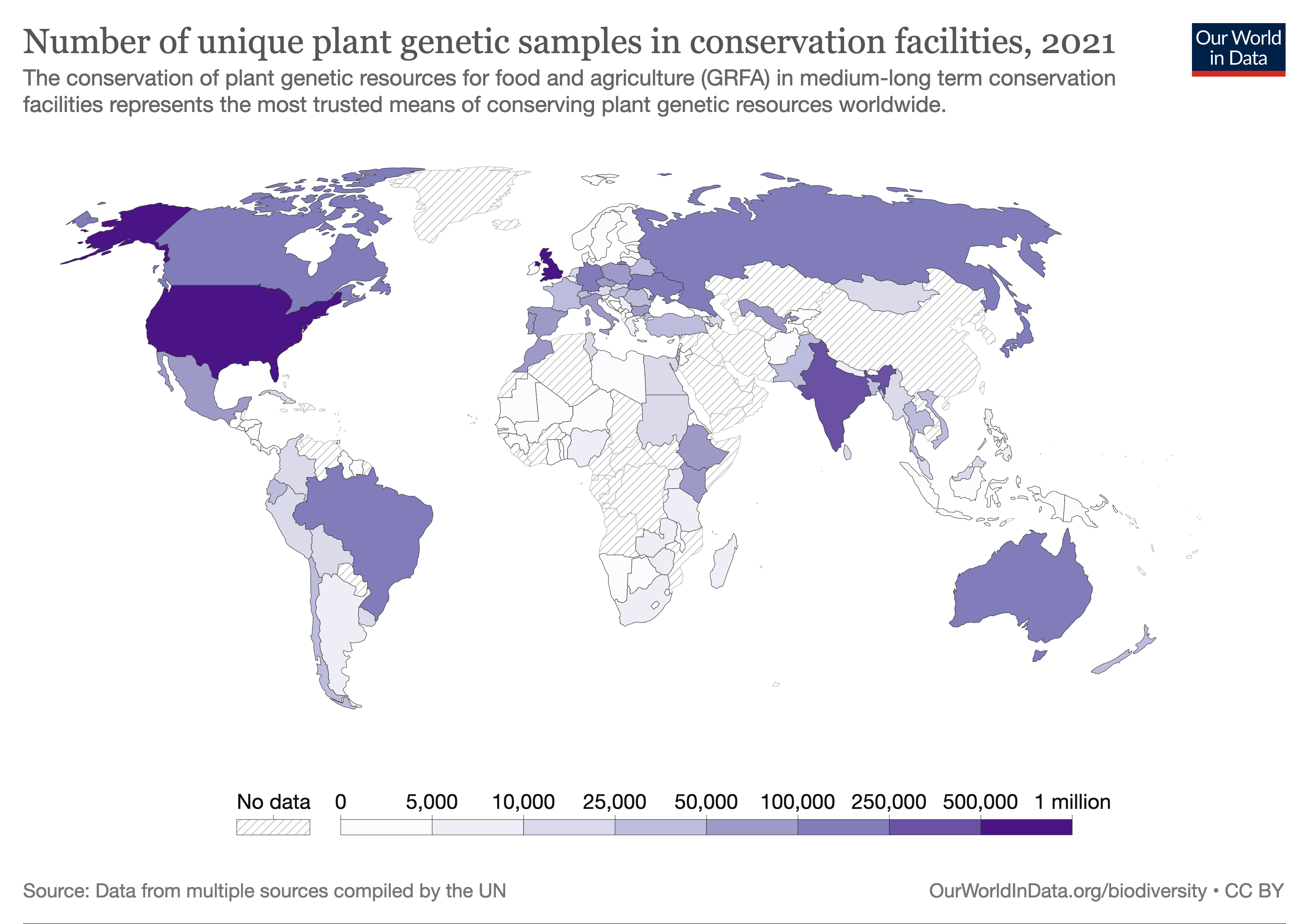
World Map Indicator 2.5.1 - Number of accessions of plant genetic resources secured in conservation facilities

The full title for Target 2.5: "By 2020 maintain genetic diversity of seeds, cultivated plants, farmed and domesticated animals and their related wild species, including through soundly managed and diversified seed and plant banks at national, regional and international levels, and ensure access to and fair and equitable sharing of benefits arising from the utilization of genetic resources and associated traditional knowledge as internationally agreed."

It has two indicators:

- Indicator 2.5.1: Number of plant and animal genetic resources for food and agriculture secured in either medium or long-term conservation facilities.
- Indicator 2.5.2: Proportion of local breeds classified as being at risk, not-at-risk or at the unknown level of risk of extinction.

The FAO's Gene Bank Standards for Plant Genetic Resources is the entity that sets the benchmark for scientific and technical best practices.

This target is set for the year 2020, unlike most SDGs which have a target date of 2030.

=== Target 2.a: Invest in rural infrastructure, agricultural research, technology and gene banks ===
World map for indicator 2.5.2 in 2019 - Proportion of local breeds classified as being at risk, not at risk or at unknown level of risk of extinction in 2019

The full title for Target 2.a: "increase investment, including through enhanced international cooperation in rural infrastructure, agricultural research and extension services, technology development, and plant and livestock gene banks to enhance agricultural productive capacity in developing countries, in particular in the least developed countries".

Agriculture orientation index for government expenditures, 2015

It has two indicators:

- Indicator 2.a.1: Agriculture orientation index for government expenditures.
- Indicator 2.a.2: Total official flows (official development assistance plus other official flows) to the agriculture sector.

The "Agriculture Orientation Index" (AOI) for Government Expenditures compares the central government contribution to agriculture with the sector's contribution to GDP. An AOI larger than 1 means the agriculture section receives a higher share of government spending relative to its economic value. An AOI smaller than 1 reflects a lower orientation to agriculture.

=== Target 2.b.: Prevent agricultural trade restrictions, market distortions and export subsidies ===
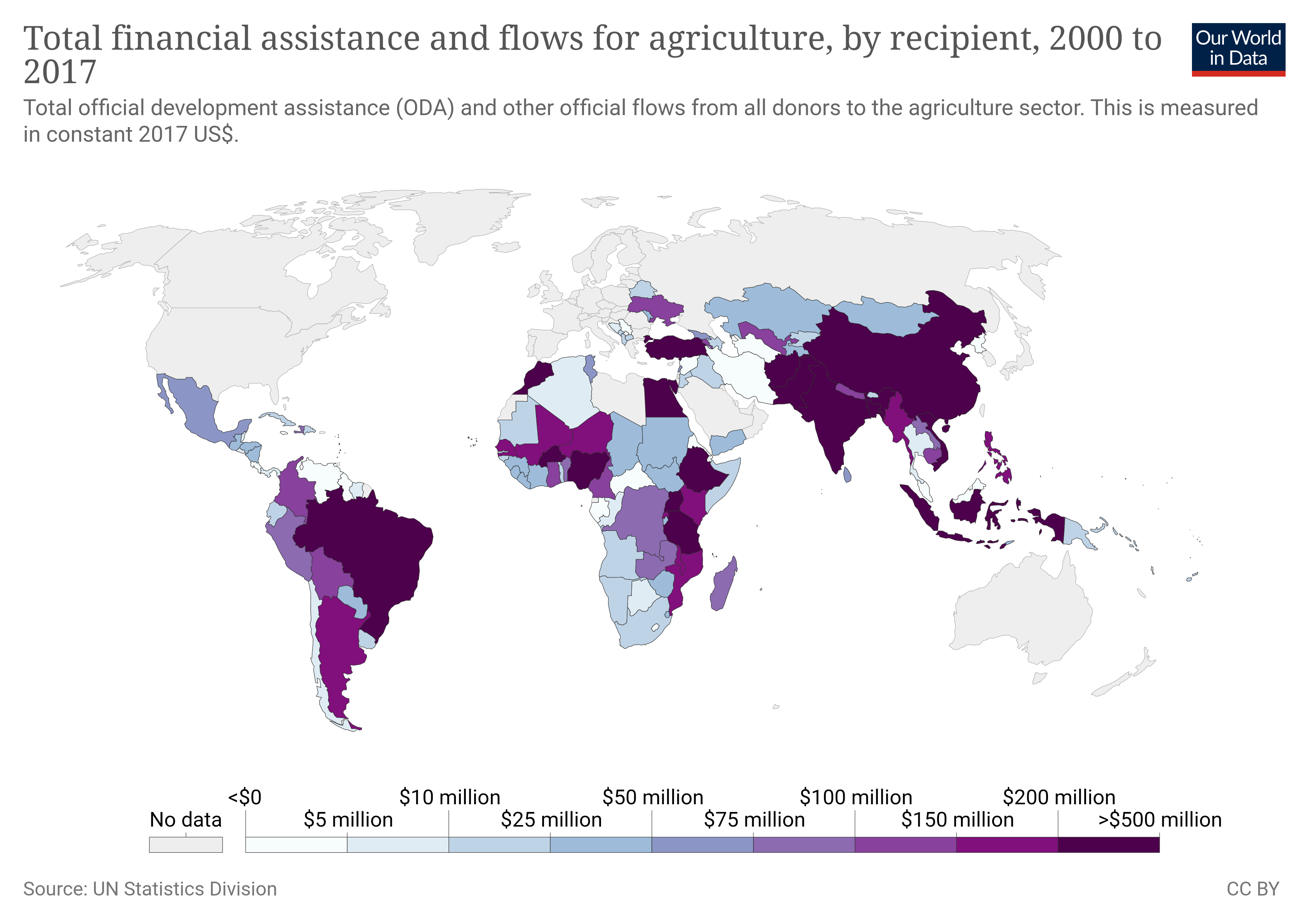
World Map Indicator 2.a.2 - Total financial assistance and flows for agriculture by recipient

The full title for Target 2.b: "Correct and prevent trade restrictions and distortions in world agricultural markets, including the parallel elimination of all forms of agricultural export subsidies and all export measures with equivalent effect, in accordance with the mandate of the Doha Development Round".

Target 2.b. has two indicators:

- Indicator 2.b.1: Producer Support Estimate". The Producer Support Estimate (PSE) is "an indicator of the annual monetary value of gross transfers from consumers and taxpayers to support agricultural producers, measured at the farm gate level, arising from policy measures, regardless of their nature, objectives or impacts on farm production or income."
- Indicator 2.b.2: Agricultural export subsidies". Export subsidies "increase the share of the exporter in the world market at the cost of others, tend to depress world market prices and may make them more unstable, because decisions on export subsidy levels can be changed unpredictably."

In 2015, the World Trade Organization decided to terminate the export subsidy for agricultural commodities. This includes "export credit, export credit guarantees, or insurance programs for agricultural products". The Doha Round is the latest round of trade negotiations among the WTO membership. It aims to reach major reforms of the international trading system and introduce lower trade barriers and revised trade rules.

=== Target 2.c. Ensure stable food commodity markets and timely access to information ===
The full title for Target 2.c is: "adopt measures to ensure the proper functioning of food commodity markets and their derivatives, and facilitate timely access to market information, including on food reserves, in order to help limit extreme food price volatility".

This target has one indicator: Indicator 2.c.1 is an Indicator of food price anomalies.

Food price anomalies are measured using the domestic food price volatility index. Domestic food price volatility index measures the variation in domestic food prices over time, this is measured as the weighted-average of a basket of commodities based on consumer or market prices. High values indicate a higher volatility in food prices. Extreme food price movements pose a threat to agricultural markets and to the food security and livelihoods, especially of the most vulnerable people.

The G20 Agricultural Market Information System (AMIS) offer regular updates on market prices.

=== Custodian agencies ===
Custodian agencies are in charge of monitoring the progress of the indicators:

- For all Indicators under Targets 2.1, 2.3 and 2.5, and for Indicators 2.a.1 and 2.c.1: Food and Agriculture Organization of the United Nations (FAO)
- Indicators 2.2.1 and 2.2.2 : United Nations Children's Fund (UNICEF), World Health Organization (WHO)
- Indicator 2.2.3: World Health Organization (WHO)
- For all Indicators under Targets 2.3 and 2.5, and for Indicators 2.a.1 and 2.c.1: Food and Agriculture Organization (FAO)
- Indicator 2.4.1: United Nations Environment Programme (UNEP) and Food and Agriculture Organization (FAO)
- Indicator 2.a.2: Organisation for Economic Co-operation and Development (OECD)
- Indicator 2.b.1: United Nations World Tourism Organization (UNWTO)

== Tools ==
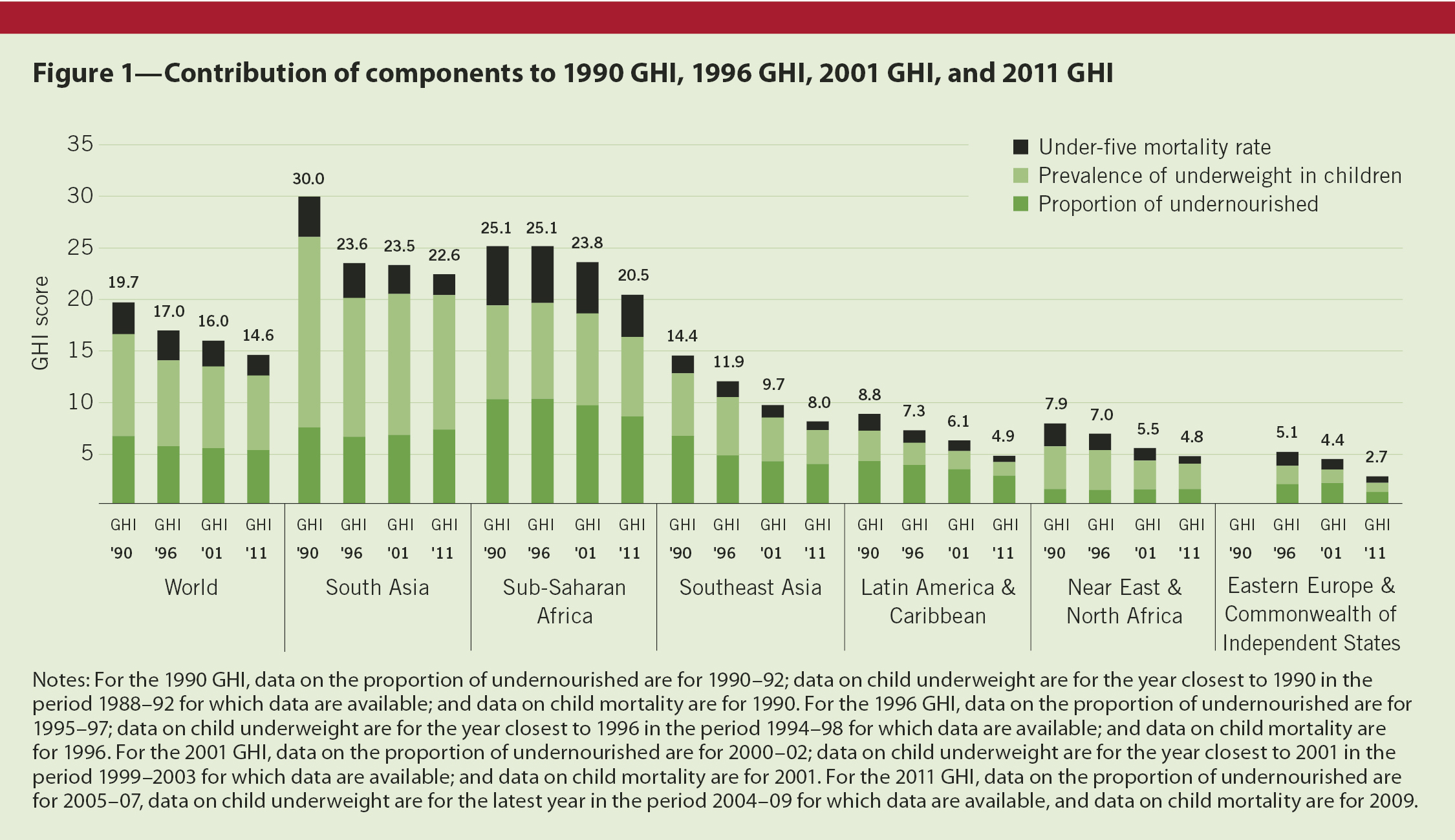
Comparing GHI Scores by Region 1990 - 2011

The Global Hunger Index (GHI) is a tool designed to measure and track hunger at global, regional, and national levels.

The FAO Food Price Index (FFPI) is a measure of the monthly change in international prices of a basket of food commodities.

== Monitoring progress ==
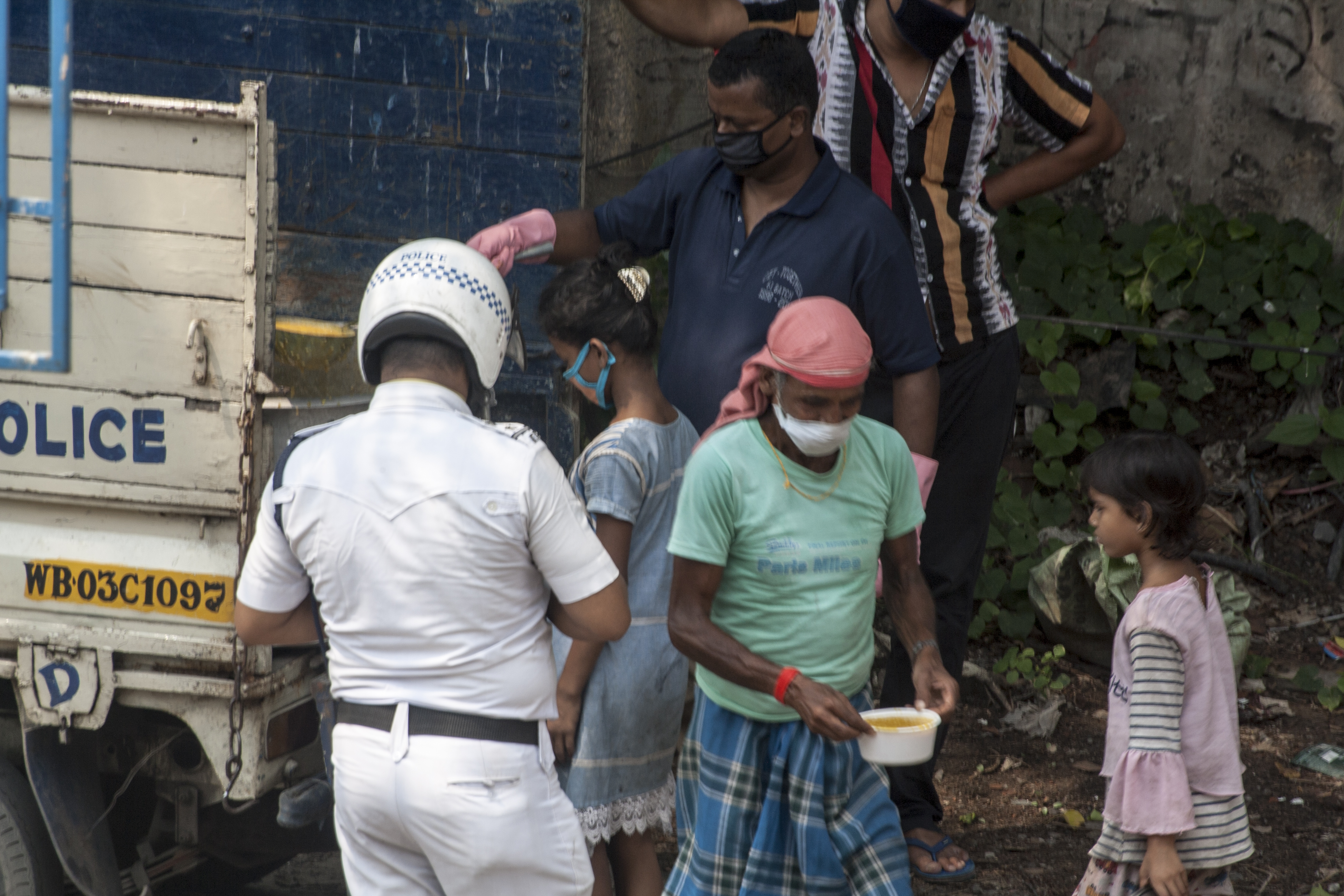
Kolkata Police North traffic guard distributing food among poor during Corona crisis in Kolkata, India

Despite the progress, research shows that more than 790 million people worldwide still suffer from hunger. There has been major progress in the fight against hunger over the last 15 years. In 2017, during a side event at the High-Level Political Forum under the theme of "Accelerating progress towards achieving SDG 2: Lessons from national implementation", a series of recommendations and actions were discussed. Stakeholders like the French UN mission, Action Against Hunger, Save The Children and Global Citizen were steering the conversation. It is unlikely there will be an end to malnutrition on the African continent by 2030.

As of 2017, only 26 of 202 UN member countries were on track to meet the SDG target to eliminate undernourishment and malnourishment, while 20 percent have made no progress at all and nearly 70 percent have no or insufficient data to determine their progress.

To achieve progress towards SDG 2 the world needs to build political will and country ownership. It also needs to improve the narrative around nutrition to make sure that it is well understood by political leaders and address gender inequality, geographic inequality and absolute poverty. It also calls for concrete actions including working at sub-national levels, increasing nutrition funding and ensuring they target the first 1000 days of life and going beyond actions that address only the immediate causes of malnutrition and look at the drivers of under-nutrition, as well as at the food system as a whole.

2019 data for world hunger is shown in the WFP Hunger Map.

== Challenges ==
The achievement of SDG 2 has been jeopardized by a number of factors, the most serious of which happened between 2019 and 2022; with the unprecedented 2019–2021 locust infestation in Eastern Africa, the 2020 global COVID-19 pandemic, and the 2022 Russian invasion of Ukraine. The Food and Agricultural Organization (FAO) has noted that trends in food insecurity, disruption in food supply, and income contribute to "increasing the risk of child malnutrition, as food insecurity affects diet quality, including the quality of children's and women's diets, and people's health in different ways". Climate change will likely cause severe disruption to all parts of the food supply chain, and the food system itself is a major driver of climate change.

=== Impact of the COVID-19 pandemic ===
Up to 142 million people in 2020, have suffered from undernourishment as a result of the COVID-19 pandemic. Stunting and wasting children statistics are likely to worsen with the pandemic. In addition, the COVID-19 pandemic "may add between 83 and 132 million people to the total number of undernourished in the world by the end of 2020 depending on the economic growth scenario".

The COVID-19 pandemic and lockdown has placed a huge amount of pressure on agricultural production, disrupted global value and supply chain. Subsequently, this raises issues of malnutrition and inadequate food supply to households, with the poorest of them all gravely affected. This has caused more than 132 million people to suffer from undernourishment in 2020. According to recent research there could be a 14% increase in the prevalence of moderate or severe wasting among children younger than five years due to the COVID-19 pandemic.

== Criticism ==
According to a group of researchers at Wageningen University, the SDG 2 targets ignore the importance of value chains and food systems. They note that SDG 2 addresses micronutrient and macronutrient deficiencies, but not overconsumption or the consumption of foods high in salt, fat, and sugars, ignoring the health problems associated with such diets. It calls sustainable agriculture without clarifying what sustainable agriculture entails exactly. The researchers argue that substantial number of indicators currently used for SDGs monitoring are not specifically developed for the SDGs, so the information needed for SDGs monitoring is not necessarily available and is not appropriate to reflect the interconnected nature of the SDG. The lack of connected or coordinated action from food production to consumption at all levels hinders progress on SDG 2.

== Links with other SDGs ==
The SDGs are deeply interconnected. All goals could be affected if progress on one specific goal is not achieved.

Climate change and natural disasters are affecting food security. Disaster risk management, climate change adaptation and mitigation are essential to increase harvests quality and quantity. Targets 2.4 and 2.5 are directly linked to the environment.

== Organizations and programmes ==
Organizations, programmes and funds that have been set up to tackle hunger and malnutrition include:

- United Nations Children's Fund (UNICEF)
- Food and Agricultural Organization (FAO)
- World Food Programme (WFP)
- International Fund for Agricultural Development (IFAD)
- World Bank
- United Nations Environment Programme (UNEP)

International NGOs include:

- Action Against Hunger (or Action Contre La Faim (ACF) in French)
- Feeding America
- The Hunger Project (THP)

== Sources ==
This article incorporates text from a free content work. Licensed under CC BY 4.0 (license statement/permission). Text taken from The State of Food Security and Nutrition in the World 2024, FAO.
