= Education policy in Brazil =

Education in Brazil

Ministry of Education
- Minister of Education: Milton Ribeiro

National education budget (2017)
- Budget: 5.95% of GDP; 15.72% of total government expenditure

General details
- Primary languages: Portuguese
- System type: Public (Federal, State, Municipal) & Private

Literacy
- Total: 91.73

Education policy in Brazil has been given importance by the federal and local governments since 1995. At that time, the government of President Fernando Henrique Cardoso and the Brazilian Ministry of Education began to pursue three areas of national education policy:

- education finance equalization
- conditional cash transfers
- education results measurement

According to the World Bank, these national education policies have tracked with global best practice, and implementation has been sustained and effective in improving performance and outcomes of education in Brazil. Though Brazil has made significant strides in improving labor force skills, Brazil is below average with respect to learning levels, secondary completion rates, and student flow efficiency, when compared to OECD and other middle-income countries. In addition, non-attendance rates and drop-out rates have also been on the increase. Moreover, these factors are especially high in lower income areas where the quality of education largely remains below the expected levels. These have been the recent targets of education policy.

== Constitutional rights to education ==
The Brazilian federal government legislates direction for national education, develops national educational plans, and provides technical and financial assistance to the states, the Federal District, and to municipalities for the development of educational systems. The Federal Constitution of Brazil outlines the educational rights of Brazilian citizens in Title VIII, Chapter III, Section 1.

- Education is the right of all and a duty of both the State and families, in cooperation with general society. The aim of education is defined as the full development of a person, qualification for work, and participation as a citizen (article 205).
- Education will be provided on the basis of I. equal conditions for access to school; II. freedom to learn, teach, research and express thought, art and knowledge; III. pluralism of ideas and coexistence of public/private schools; IV. free public education; V. appreciation of teaching professionals with minimum salaries based on exams and credentials; VI. democratic administration; and VII. guarantee of quality (article 206).
- Universities are given significant autonomy but have the requirement to comply with non-dissociation of teaching, research and extension (article 207).
- The state will fulfill its educational duty by ensuring I. mandatory and free elementary education; II. progressively universal high school education; III. specialized schooling for the handicapped; IV. assistance for early childhood education; V. access to higher education, research and the arts; VI. regular night courses; assistance through supplementary programs for school material, transportation, food, and health (article 208).
- Teaching is open to private enterprise as long as they comply with rules of national education and are authorized and evaluated by the government (article 209).
- Minimum curricula will be established for elementary schools to ensure common national education. However, some topics such as religion are optional and Indian communities are able to use their own language and learning methods (article 210).
- The Union, states, Federal District and municipalities will cooperate to organize educational activities; each governing body will take on a different role (article 211).
- A minimum percentage of tax revenues – 18% from the Union and 25% from the states, Federal District and municipalities – is to be used towards education through distribution process set out in law. Donations from companies for education are permitted (article 212).
- Public resources will be allocated to schools and other community, religious or philanthropic schools that channel funds to education, scholarships, or research (article 213).
- The law will establish a multi-year national educational plan to work towards the eradication of illiteracy, universal school assistance, improved quality, professional training, and humanistic, scientific, and technological advances (article 214).

== Education finance equalization policies ==
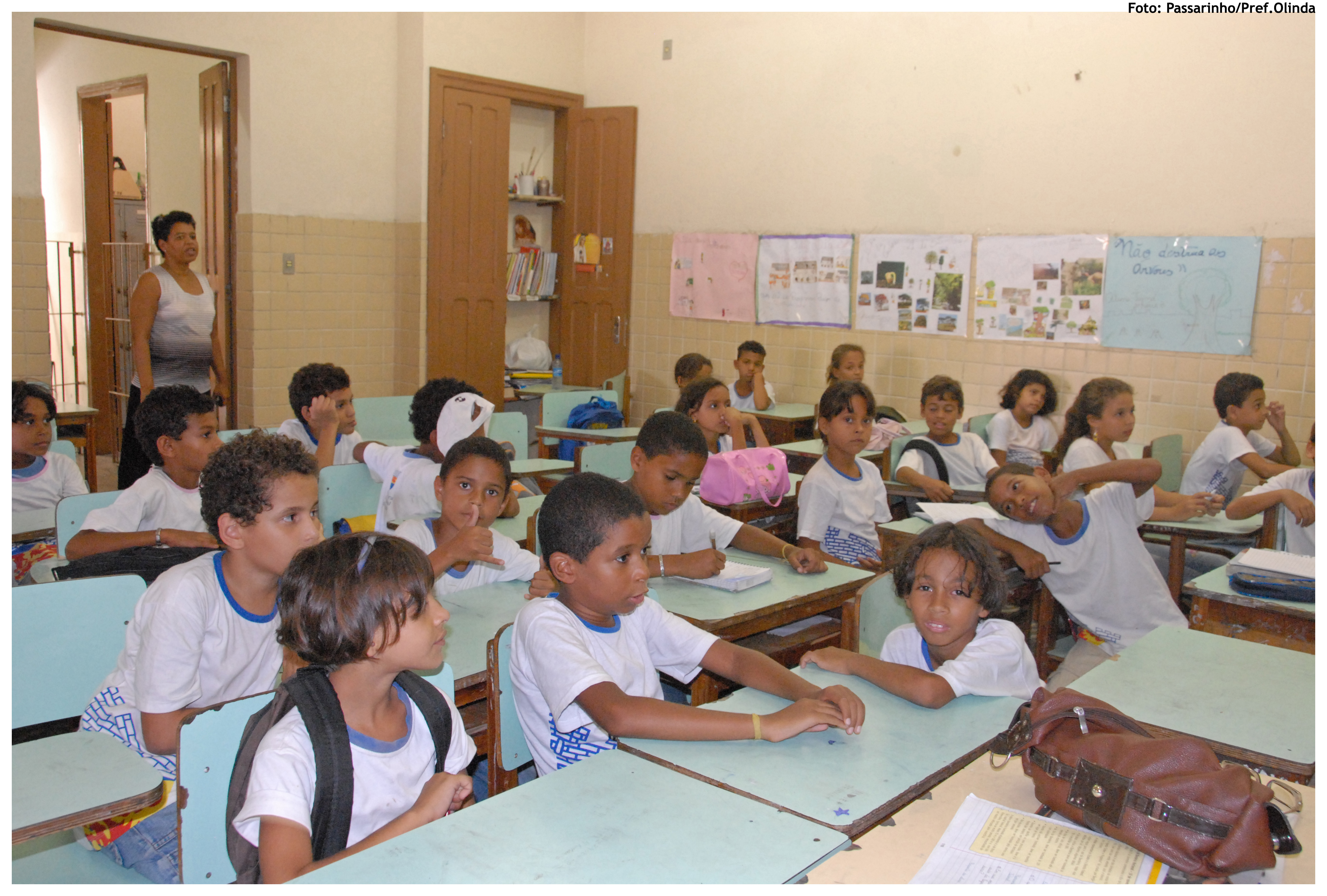
School in the Northeast of Brazil

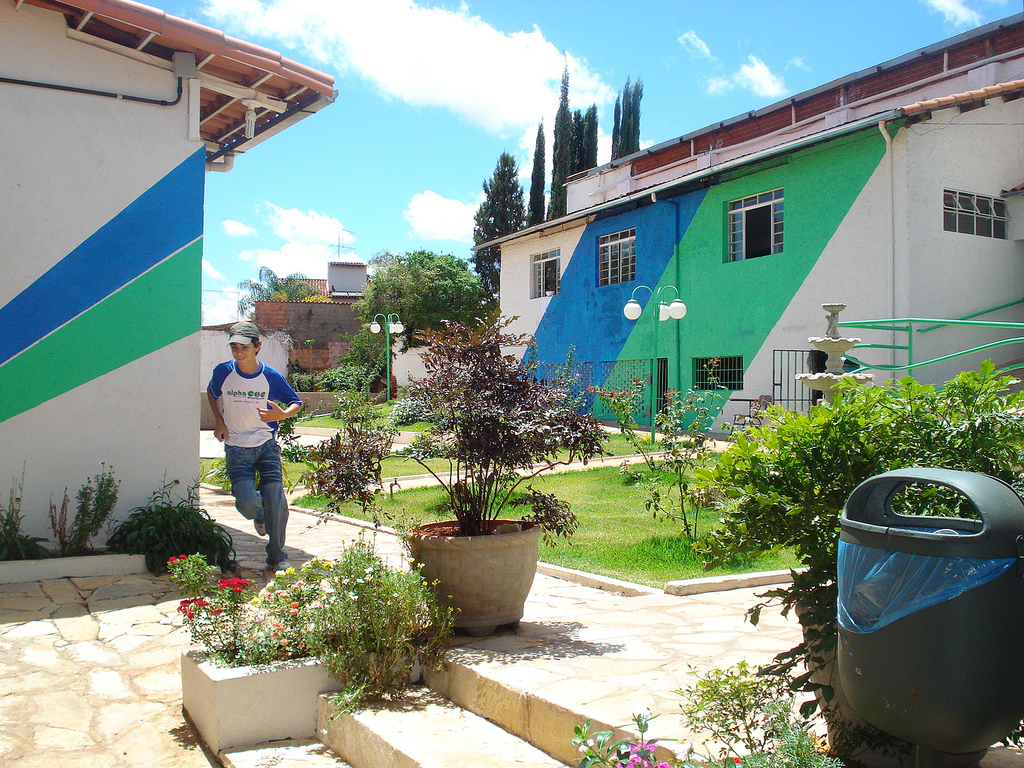
Private School in Brazil

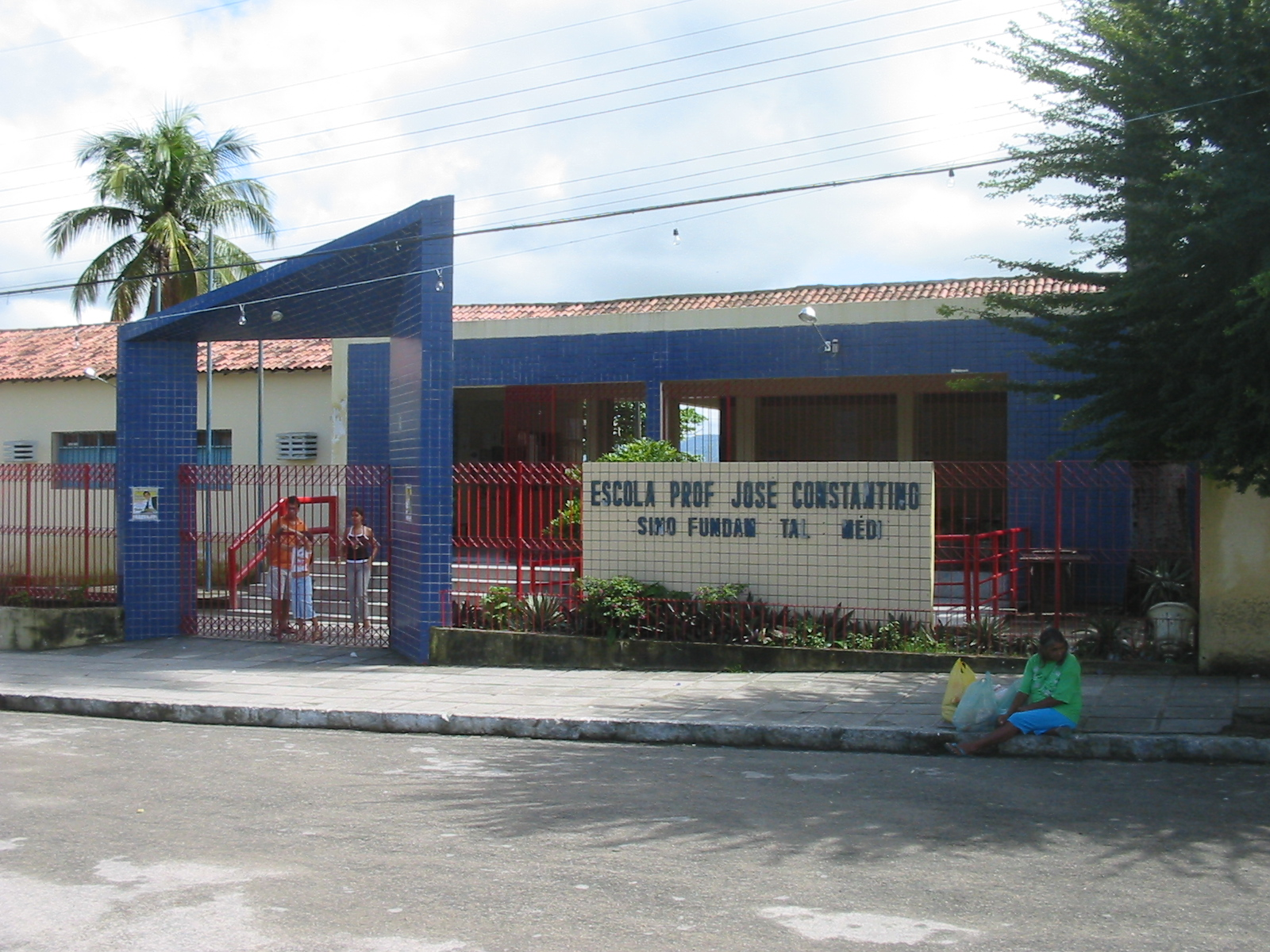
Escola Professor José Constantino

To reduce inequality and variation in per student spending between different regions and schools, in 1996, the government introduced and expanded education finance equalization policies, in particular through the creation of FUNDEF (1996–2006) and FUNDEB (2006–present), both of which entailed policies about allocation of education funding and increases in overall funding of education.

=== FUNDEF ===
The Fund for Maintenance and Development of the Fundamental Education and Valorization of Teaching (Fundo para Manutenção e Desenvolvimento do Ensino Fundamental e Valorização do Magistério (FUNDEF)) was introduced in 1996 to reform the funding of education in Brazil. It was established to make sure that money mandated by the constitution is actually spent on education and to establish a per student spending floor for the whole country. The policy mandated redistribution of funds within states across municipalities, so that all municipalities could reach the per student spending requirement. Additionally, federal government then supplemented spending in states and municipalities that could not afford the national spending floor. Finally, FUNDEF required that 60% of spending go towards teacher salaries and 40% go towards school operations.

In 1998, when FUNDEF was implemented, 30.6 billion reais(R$) were redistributed to six different states. Overall spending increased from approximately 2% of GDP in 1995 to 4% of GDP in 2008. Additionally, teacher salaries increased by an average of 70% in the first few years of implementation. According to research done by the Organization for Economic Cooperation and Development (OECD), FUNDEF played an important role in increasing enrollment rates over that period, particularly in small municipalities. It was, however, limited in scope, entailing the investment of funds only to elementary education and expiring in September 2006 when it reached 10 years of creation.

=== FUNDEB ===
On January 24, 2006, the House of Representatives approved the Proposal for Amendment to the Constitution creating the Fund for the Development of Basic Education and Appreciation of the Teaching Profession (Fundo de Manutenção e Desenvolvimento da Educação Básica e de Valorização de Profissionais de Educação (FUNDEB)), intended to finance elementary education (kindergarten, preschool, elementary, and high school education).

FUNDEB was made effective for fourteen years and has been gradually implemented. It was formed by allocating 20% of resources from state and federal taxes, and distributed these among each State and Municipality in proportion to the number of students enrolled. FUNDEB entailed committing R$2 billion in the first year, R$2.9 billion in the second year, R$3.7 billion in the third and R$4.5 billion in the fourth year and successive. It extended the financing equalization introduced under FUNDEF to secondary school and pre-school education, in order to ensure funding of basic education for all students in Brazil. FUNDEB also explicitly ensured funding for indigenous communities. As a result, FUNDEB increased the volume of federal funds committed to basic education by ten times, injecting new funds into all the stages of basic education and allocating resources for programs targeted to youth and adults.

The main objective of FUNDEB is to continue to redistribute resources related to education across the country, taking into account the social and economic development of regions. The federal government provides supplementary funds targeted to regions where the investment per student is below the minimum value for each year, allocating funds according to the number of students in basic education based on school census data from the previous year. Additionally, federal, state, and municipal councils, empowered by the Ministry of Education, provide monitoring and control of distribution, transfer and use of program resources.

== Conditional cash transfer policies ==
Brazil offers Conditional Cash Transfers (CCTs) to students, and as of January 2011 has one of the largest CCT programs of any country. The transfers are currently paid to 26% of the population.

=== Bolsa Escola ===
Bolsa Escola is a cash transfer program that provided cash payments to poor families with children ages 6 to 15 in exchange for their enrollment in school and their attendance of at least 85% of school days. The program was first implemented in 1995 by the municipalities of Brasília (the Federal District) and Campinas (in São Paulo State). Within three years, over 50 municipalities in seven states implemented similar programs. After these successful local CCT experiences in the mid-1990s, CCTs gained momentum in Congress, prompting President Fernando Henrique Cardoso's government to create the Federal Bolsa Escola program in April 2001.

By the end of 2001, it had been implemented in 98% of the 5,561 Brazilian municipalities, providing stipends to over 8.2 million children from 4.8 million families, at a cost of over US$700 million. In October 2003, President Luiz Inácio Lula da Silva unified Bolsa Escola and three other federal cash transfer programs into a single program called Bolsa Família.

=== Bolsa Família ===
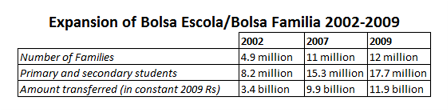

Bolsa Família (Family Allowance) is a social welfare program which provides financial aid to poor Brazilian families. Families must ensure that their children attend school and are vaccinated. The program's dual aims are to reduce short-term poverty by direct cash aid, and fight long-term poverty by increasing educational and experiential skills among the poor through conditional cash grants.

The Economist described Bolsa Família as an "anti-poverty scheme invented in South America" (which) "is winning converts worldwide." Bolsa Familia was in 2007 and 2010 the largest conditional cash transfer program in the world, though the Mexican program Oportunidades was the first nationwide program of this kind. The Bolsa Familia program was mentioned as one factor contributing to the reduction of poverty in Brazil, which fell 27.7% during the first term in the Lula administration. About 12 million Brazilian families receive funds from Bolsa Família,

== Educational measurement ==
The National Institute of Educational Studies and Research (Instituto Nacional de Estudos e Pesquisas Educacionais Anísio Teixeira (INEP)) is the assessment arm of the Ministry of Education. It was created in 1990 to collect, process and analyze data on education in Brazil.

=== The National Assessment of Basic Education and the Prova Brasil ===
The National Assessment of Basic Education (Sistema Nacional de Avaliação da Educação Básica (SAEB)) and the Prova Brasil ("Test of Brazil") are two exams that make up the Evaluation System of Basic Education in Brazil.

The SAEB was the first national Brazilian initiative to measure the Brazilian educational system in depth. It was developed in the late 1980s and was first applied in 1990. In 1995, SAEB was restructured to allow for performance comparison from year to year. Since the first assessment, it has provided data on the quality of the educational systems of Brazil as a whole, geographic regions and the federal units (states and Federal Districts). The SAEB is carried out by INEP / Ministry of Education every two years. Tests on the Portuguese language and mathematics are taken by a sample of students enrolled in the 4th and 8th grades of elementary school and also the 3rd year of high school, in public and private schools located in both urban and rural areas. Results are aggregated for each state of Brazil and for Brazil as a whole.

The Prova Brasil assessment was established in 2005, due to a desire for more detail beyond that included in the SAEB. It expanded the range of results providing data not only for Brazil and Brazilian states, but also for each municipality and school participant. The Prova Brasil assesses all students in public urban education in the 4th and 8th grades of elementary school, public elementary education in state schools, municipal and federal levels of rural and urban schools that have at least 20 students enrolled in the grade assessed. The methodology of the two evaluations is the same and they have been used in combination since 2007, but students take one or the other and never both.

The results of the SAEB and Prova Brasil are distributed to the public of Brazil and anyone can view the results online.

=== Index of Basic Education Quality ===
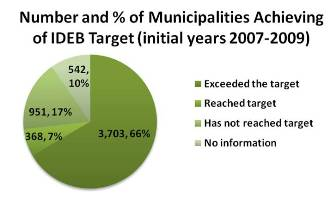

In 2007, the Brazilian Ministry of Education implemented the Index of Basic Education Quality (Indice de Desenvolvimento da Educacao Basica (IDEB)) to monitor education progress in every school, municipality, state and region of Brazil. The IDEB builds on the SAEB and the Prova Brasil, combining the results of the Prova Brasil test with data on student enrollments and rates of repetition and graduation to generate an index of school performance for all but the smallest of Brazil's 175,000 primary and secondary schools, 5,000-plus municipal school systems, 26 state systems and the federal district systems. The results of IDEB studies are reported twice a year, and receive media coverage. Based upon the findings, the federal government establishes targets for improvement of primary and secondary education across schools.

In the initial years of IDEB's implementation, 2007–2009, it was found that over 70% of municipalities either reached or exceeded targets set by the Ministry of Education and INEP for early primary education.

== Educational performance and outcomes ==
According to data from the SAEB/Proval Brasil from 1999 to 2007, there is evidence that educational performance is improving in all regions of Brazil. Performance for the lowest income students has also improved. According to the World Bank, Brazil increased PISA scores more for the lowest income groups than the highest income groups. However, gaps in school attendance and learning levels still remain between different income groups.

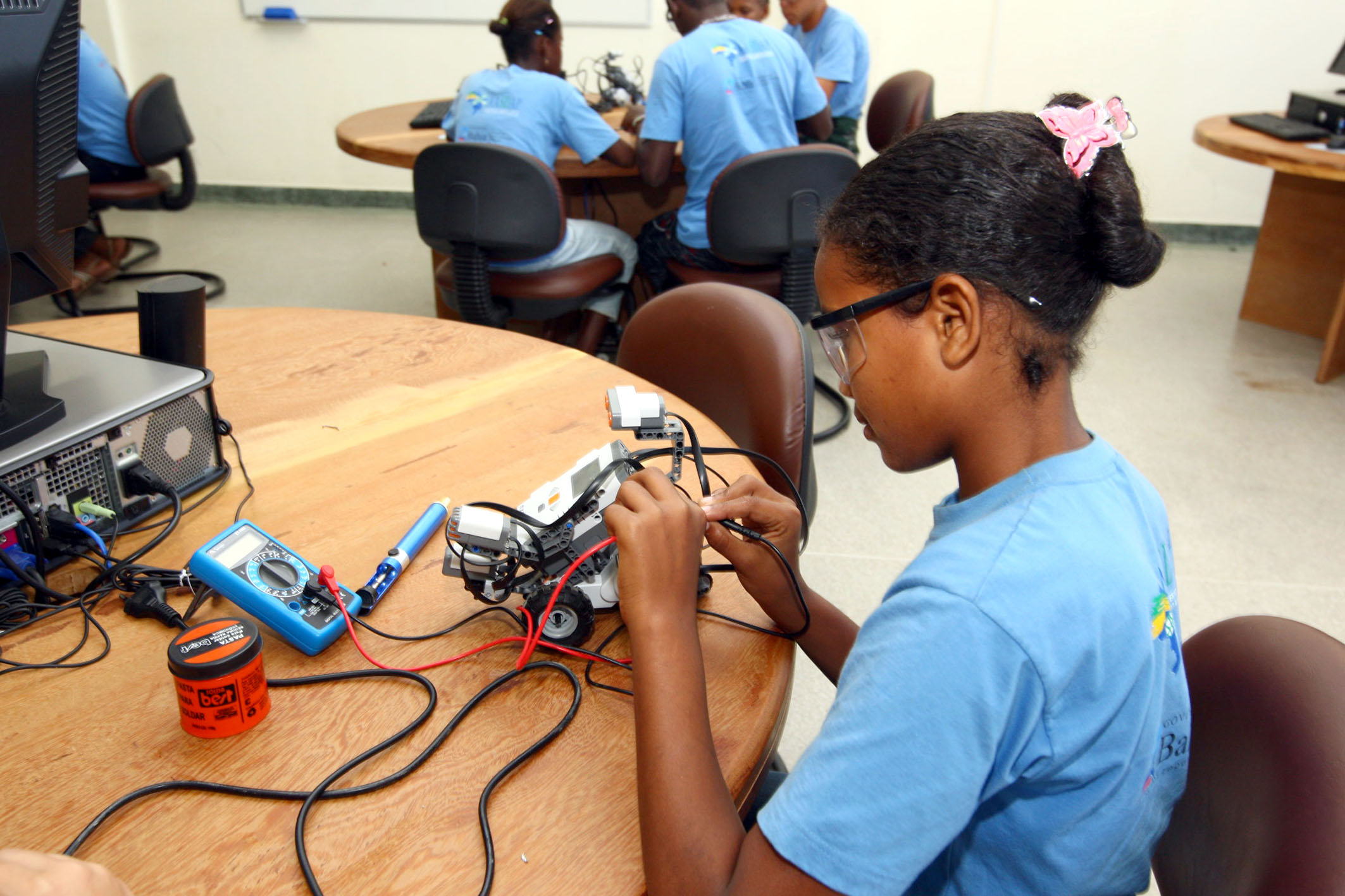
A Center for Scientific Education in the Central Region (Centro de Educação Cientifica de Serrinha)

=== PISA learning outcomes ===
The Program for International Student Assessment (PISA) test is designed to measure trends in countries' average student scores over time, relative to a mean score of 500 achieved by the OECD countries as a group in the year 2000.

Brazil has participated in PISA since 2000. Brazil had the strongest improvement in math and 3rd largest improvement overall (after Luxembourg and Chile) between 2000 and 2009 on PISA, but its absolute scores are still low compared to other participants. For example, 60% of students still scored below 400-showing that they lacked basic numeracy skills—compared with 14% across the OECD and 3-5% in top performing countries Shanghai and Korea. Additionally, Brazil falls behind others in the LAC (Latin American and Caribbean) region, including Chile, Uruguay and Mexico; and LAC countries as a whole trail the OECD average performance. According to the World Bank, "The gap in math skills between the average student in Shanghai and the average Brazilian student is approximately 5 school years."

=== Student attendance ===
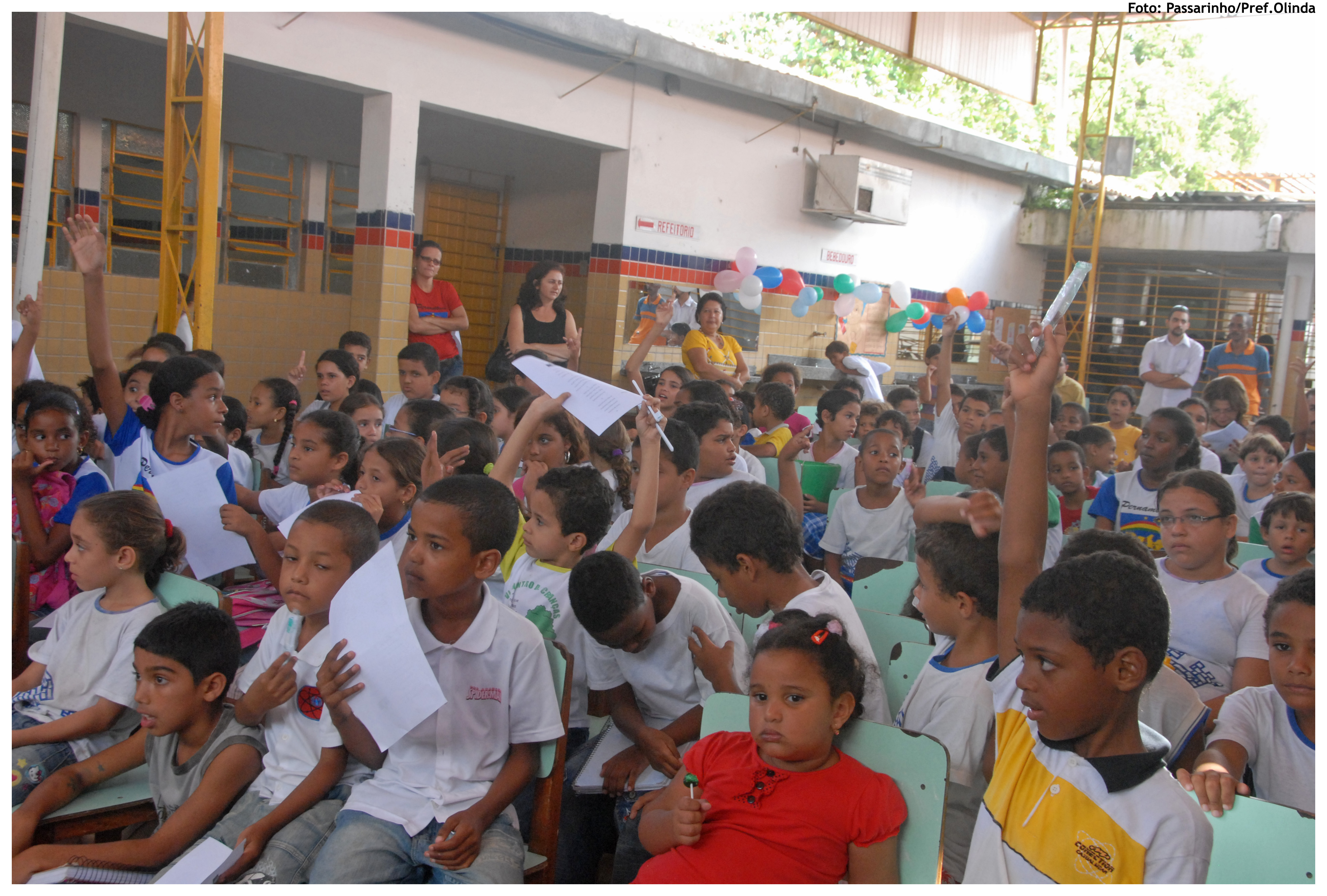
Students at a Northeast Municipality School: Escola Coronel José Domingos

After the expansion in education policies, enrollment rates in primary and lower-secondary education have increased. The percentage of children who finish primary education has increased from 42% to 71%, and the percentage of children who complete secondary school has increased from 28% to 55%. Additionally, in 1993 secondary education was often attained only when students came from parents who had attained secondary education. As of 2009, students complete between 9 and 11 years of schooling regardless of the schooling level of their parents, which ranges from 0–10 years. According to the 2007 National Household Sample Survey carried out by the Brazilian Institute for Geography and Statistics (IBGE), 97.6% of children between 7 and 14 years old are in school, 27 million students. Children that are not in school tend to belong to afro-descendent, indigenous and quilombola or poor communities, as well as children with disabilities or at-risk youth.

Non-attendance in schools is still a concern in parts of the country. As per estimates given by the IBGE, in more wealthy states, 95% of the children enroll from the beginning. However, in lower income regions, the rate of children enrolling at the beginning is recorded between 60% and 80%. According to a UNICEF survey, 35% of children complete fifth grade education in Brazil.

== New developments in policy ==
=== Raising teacher quality and training ===
The Ministry of Education has begun to introduce new standards for teachers, federally supported, higher quality teacher training programs and textbook screening and production. Such investment includes programs such as Mais Educacao, and the expansion of the federal technical schools. The federal government has also invested in policies like school-level planning under FUNDESCOLA, multi-grade teaching under Escola Ativa and capacity building for municipal education managers, with PAR.

=== Participation of non-governmental organizations ===
There are some examples of Brazilian government officials engaging with non-governmental organizations to support or manage teachers and schools:

- Popular Center for Culture and Development took over the administration of the local Secretariat of Education between August 2003 and late 2004 and implemented a variety of new teaching tools in the rural schools of Araçuaí, a poor municipality in the southeastern state of Minas Gerais.
- In Salvador, capital of the northern state of Bahia, Axé Project got permission in 1999 to create the Barbosa Romeo Municipal School, targeting at-risk youngsters like street kids.

=== Partnerships with Brazilian companies ===
The presidents of several Brazilian companies, including DPaschoal car parts chain, the Gerdau Group and major banks Itaú, Bradesco and Santander, founded All for Education (see Todos Pela Educação in Portuguese), and developed goals for Brazil's education and monitoring tools with help of U.S. and Brazilian education experts. All for Education engaged academic and media channels to help promote education as a national priority, and according to a poll by CNO/IBOPE education moved from the seventh biggest public concern to second, after crime.

== See also ==
- Academic degree – Brazil
- Bachelor's degree – Brazil
- High school – Brazil
- Politics of Brazil
- Primary education – Brazil
- Secondary education – Brazil
- Social issues in Brazil – Education
- Undergraduate education – Brazilian system
- Universities and higher education in Brazil
