= Education Policy Analysis Archives =

- Discipline: Education policy
- Language: English, Spanish, Portuguese
- Edited by: Jeanne M. Powers

Publication details
- History: 1993-present
- Publisher: Mary Lou Fulton Teachers College
- Frequency: Upon acceptance
- Open access: Yes
- License: Creative Commons Attribution 3.0 License

Standard abbreviations
- ISO 4: Educ. Policy Anal. Arch.

Indexing
- ISSN: 1068-2341
- LCCN: sn93007169
- OCLC no.: 27483741

Links
- Journal homepage; Online access; Online archive

Education Policy Analysis Archives / Archivos Analíticos de Políticas Educativas is a peer-reviewed open access academic journal established in 1993 by Gene V. Glass (Arizona State University). Articles are published in English, Spanish, or Portuguese. The journal covers education policy at all levels of the education system in all nations. The Lead Editor is Jeanne M. Powers (Arizona State University). The Coordinating Editors for Latin America are Sergio Celis and M. Beatriz Fernández, Universidad de Chile, Chile. The Coordinating Editors for Spanish-North America are Magdalena Bustos Aguirre, Sergio Gerardo Málaga-Villegas, and Ricardo Pérez Mora, Mexico. The Coordinating Editors (Portuguese) are Claudia Lemos Vóvio, Fabiany Tavares Silva, Gilberto José Miranda, and Luiz Carlos Novaes of Brazil. The Director of the Scholarly Communications Group is Gustavo Enrique Fischman, Arizona State University. The journal is abstracted and indexed in Education Research Complete and Scopus.

EPAA/AAPE is the highest ranked open access journal in the “education policy” category and the #2 education policy journal as per Google Scholar (h-5 index of 400. EPAA/AAPE articles were indexed in more than 20 registries, including CAPES (Qualis A1 rank - Brazil), DIALNET (Spain), the Directory of Open Access Journals, EBSCOhost, Scopus (SJR ranking - Quartile 2), ERIC, PubMed, SOCOLAR (China), and Web of Science Emerging Social Science Index, among others.
