= Fome Zero =

Government program in Brazil

Program logo

Fome Zero (Portuguese pronunciation: [ˈfomi ˈzɛɾu], Zero Hunger) is a program of the Government of Brazil introduced by President Luiz Inácio Lula da Silva in 2003, with the goal to eradicate hunger and extreme poverty in the country. It followed the lead of projects that had already put into practice by the Fernando Henrique Cardoso administration, which was named Bolsa Escola (School Stipend), and which had been established in 1995.

== Contents of the program ==
Lula followed the lead of projects that had already put into practice by the Fernando Henrique Cardoso administration, which was named Bolsa Escola (School Stipend), and which had been established in 1995. Lula expanded those projects with the new Fome Zero ("Zero Hunger") program, which was part of the Bolsa Família (Family Allowance) plan.

The program is co-ordinated by the Ministry of Social Development and Hunger Combat (Ministério do Desenvolvimento Social e Combate à Fome) and was intended to put into action the government's strategy to guarantee the right of access to basic food. The program takes a number of forms, ranging from direct financial aid to the poorest families (with the Bolsa Família card) to diverse strategies such as creating water cisterns in Brazil's semi-arid areas, creating low-cost restaurants, educating people about healthy eating habits, distributing vitamins and iron supplements, supporting subsistence family farming and giving access to microcredit.

== Effects ==
The program is believed to have contributed to Brazil's recent reported improvements in its fight against poverty, according to research promoted by some universities and the Brazilian Institute of Geography and Statistics (IBGE). An ex ante econometric evaluation of Bolsa Escola did find significant effects on both school attendance rates and the number of children involved in child labor.

The World Bank, which created in June 2005 a Bolsa Família Project to assist the Brazilian government in managing the Bolsa Família Program, declared that "Although the program is relatively young, some results are already apparent, including: (...) contributions to improved education outcomes, and impacts on children’s growth, food consumption, and diet quality".

A study by the UNDP Poverty Centre found that over 80% of the Bolsa Familia benefits went to families in poverty (making under half the minimum wage per capita), thus most of the benefits were going to the poor. BF was also claimed to have been responsible for about 20% of the drop in inequality in Brazil since 2001, which is welcome in one of the most unequal countries on the planet. Research promoted by the World Bank showed a significant reduction in child labor exploitation among children benefited by the Bolsa Família program.

The program has also been reported to have made a significant impact on the ability of the poorest families to eat. Children in public school receive one free meal a day—two in the poorest areas—and so less of their family's limited income is needed to pay for food. In a survey of Bolsa Familia recipients, 82.4% reported eating better; additionally, it was reported to increase the incomes of the poorer families by about 25%.

== Criticism ==
In 2003, David de Ferranti, the World Bank IBRD representative for Latin America and the Caribbean, criticized the program, due to its lack of clear focus, saying the program did not combat the country's poverty and income inequality. He also criticised the mechanisms for money donation and food gathering and distribution.

Five months after Lula took office, the budget for Fome Zero was cut down a third from its original amount, and one year later, about $800 million was budgeted toward the program, but only $130 million of that was actually disbursed.

Fome Zero was considered by the opposition at the time (especially the PSDB and DEM parties) a failure, due to what they believed was the government's inability to manage the program effectively. Murilo Zauith, a PFL federal deputy, in March 2005, said the program was faulty, citing as an example the death of several indigenous children due to malnutrition in the city of Dourados, Mato Grosso do Sul. However, Humberto Costa, the Minister of Health at the time, considered the death count average and not alarming.

Another early criticism was that the program turned mostly into a money-transfer program, subject to corruption, and did not completely solve the problem. Data from 2014 to 2015 showed that malnutrition is still a problem in Brazil and responsible by 4.3 deaths per 100,000 people per year, linked to the fact that 3.8% of the population (7.6 million people) still earns less than US$1 a day. However, this was down from 7.6 deaths per 100k in 2002 and fell further to 2.4 by 2021.

== Sources ==
- Aaron Ansell, Zero Hunger: Political Culture and Antipoverty Policy in Northeast Brazil (Chapel Hill: University of North Carolina Press, 2014) ISBN 978-1-4696-1397-0

== See also ==
- Bolsa Família
- Lulism
- Zero Poverty Program, a similar program introduced by Yogi Adityanath in the Indian state of Uttar Pradesh
