= Education policy =

Rules which govern schooling systems

Education policy consists of the principles and policy decisions that influence the field of education, as well as the collection of laws and rules that govern the operation of education systems. Education governance is often shared across local, state, and federal levels. Some analysts view education policy as a form of social engineering.

Education occurs in diverse forms across various institutions. Examples of such educational institutions may include early childhood education centers, kindergarten to 12th grade schools, two- and four-year colleges or universities, graduate and professional education institutes, adult-education establishments, and job-training schemes. The goals of these institutions help shape education policy. Furthermore, these education policies can affect the education people engage in at all ages.

Key areas of debate in education policy, specifically from the field of schools, include school size, class size, school choice, school privatization, police in schools, tracking, teacher selection, education and certification, teacher pay, teaching methods, curricular content, graduation requirements, school-infrastructure investment, and the values that schools are expected to uphold and model.

Education policy also addresses challenges in higher education. The Pell Institute analyzes the barriers experienced by teachers and students within community colleges and universities. These issues involve undocumented students, sex education, and federal-grant aides.

Education policy analysis is the systematic study of education policies. It seeks to answer questions about the purpose of education, the objectives (societal and personal) that it is designed to attain, the methods for attaining them, and the tools for measuring their success or failure. Research intended to inform education policy is carried out in a wide variety of institutions and in many academic disciplines. For example, researchers are affiliated with schools and departments of education, public policy, psychology, economics, sociology, and human development. Additionally, sociology, political science, economics, and law are disciplines that can be used to better understand how education systems function, their impacts, and how policies might be changed under different conditions. Education policy is sometimes considered a sub-field of social policy and public policy. Examples of education policy analysis may be found in such academic journals as Education Policy Analysis Archives and in university-policy centers such as the National Education Policy Center housed at the University of Colorado Boulder.

== Education reform in the United States ==
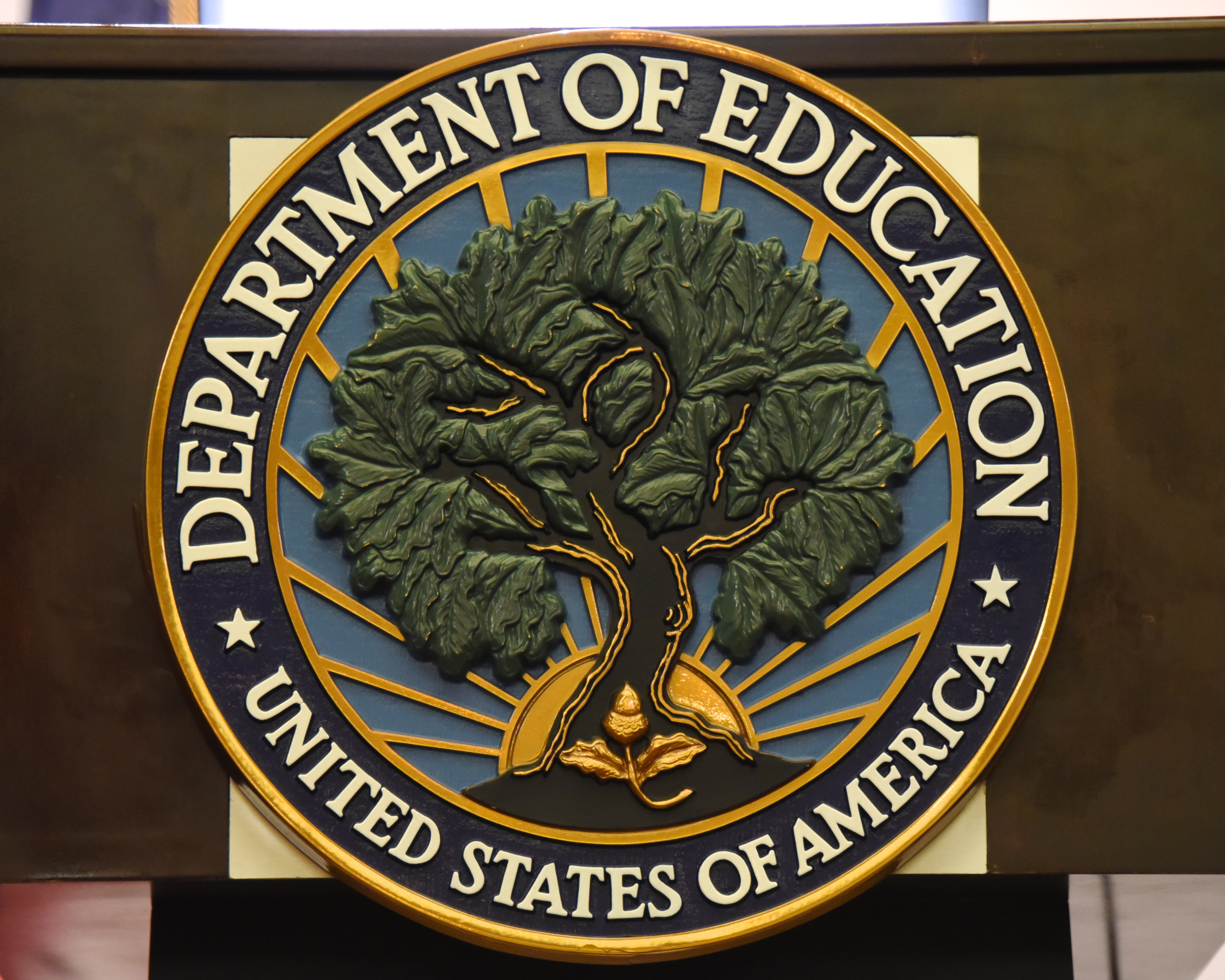
Official seal of the United States Department of Education

Over the past 30 years, policymakers have seen a steady increase in their involvement at the state and federal levels of government in US schools. According to the Tenth Amendment to the United States Constitution, state governments have the main authority on education. State governments spend most of their budgets funding schools, whereas only a small portion of the federal budget is allocated to education. The federal government advances its role by building on state and local education policies. Over time, the role of the federal government grew through federal education policies that affected the funding and evaluation of education. For example, the National Defense Education Act (NDEA) was established in 1958 to increase federal funding to schools, and the National Assessment of Educational Progress was created to track and compare student performance in academic subjects across the states. Moreover, the United States Department of Education was created in 1979.

Education reform is currently being seen as a "tangled web" due to the nature of the education authority. Some education policies are being defined at either the federal, state or local level and in most cases, their authorities overlap one another. This manner of authority has led many to believe education governance is inefficient. Compared to other OECD countries, educational governance in the US is more decentralized, and most of its autonomy is found within the state and district levels. The reason for this is that US citizens put an emphasis on individual rights and fear federal government overreach. A 2011 report by the National Center on Education and the Economy believes that the education system is neither coherent nor likely to see improvements due to the nature of it.

A critical race theory analysis of the history of education reform in the United States reveals the influence of systemic racism on educational policy. Historically, educational policy changes have resulted from progress from protest, and such progress has met with pushback.

== Teacher policy ==
Teacher policy is education policy that addresses the preparation, recruitment, and retention of teachers. A teacher policy is guided by the same overall vision and essential characteristics as the wider education policy.

=== Nine key dimensions ===
Nine key dimensions are considered crucial to any comprehensive teacher policy:

- Recruitment and retention
- Education (initial and continuing)
- Deployment
- Career structures/paths
- Employment and working conditions
- Reward and remuneration
- Standards
- Accountability
- School governance

==== Recruitment and retention ====
Effective education systems have safe ways to attract, recruit, and retain well-performing educators. There has been a growing demand for teachers, but the supply continues to decline, and many leave the profession. This development threatens the "academic and economic welfare of students" and drains taxpayers' money. Federal and state governments, along with school districts, can invest in complete human capital systems to prepare and retain committed and capable educators for the long term. Reasonable talent management strategies for the education sector focus on the recruitment, development, and retention of intelligent and efficient teachers.

==== Education (initial and continuing) ====
Teachers can become better educators by going back to school periodically. School administrators and district officials can encourage teachers to use available resources and opportunities to continue the learning process. Conferences with workshops provide tools that teachers can use to integrate technology into the classroom and earn Continuing Professional Development Units to boost their careers. School administrators are obliged to ensure that teachers are competent in classroom management and the protection of students from harm such as bullying.

== Gender equality ==
Twenty countries whose education sector plans were reviewed from a gender equality perspective

Quality and timely data and evidence are key factors for policy-making, planning, and the delivery to advance gender equality in and through education. They can help countries to identify and analyze gendered patterns and trends, and better plan and target resources to address gender inequalities. They can also help to identify and inform interventions that influence participation, learning, and empowerment, from early childhood to tertiary education and beyond.

Though the SDG 4 monitoring framework is a step forward in the policy process, a complete monitoring framework for gender equality in and through education should include indicators that consider:

- Social and gender norms,
- Values and attitudes (many of which can be influenced by education).
- Education laws and policies, as well as legislation and policies outside of the education system.
- Resource distribution; and teaching and learning practices and environments.

Efforts are also needed to track disparities in informal and non-formal learning contexts with a lifelong learning approach, and to ensure that data are collected on the most excluded.

== See also ==
- Education policy in Brazil
- Higher education policy
- Social policy

== Sources ==
- This article incorporates text from a free content work. Licensed under CC BY-SA 3.0 IGO (license statement/permission). Text taken from Teacher policy development guide: summary, 14, 18, UNESCO, UNESCO. UNESCO.
- This article incorporates text from a free content work. Licensed under CC BY-SA 3.0 IGO. Text taken from From access to empowerment: UNESCO strategy for gender equality in and through education 2019-2025, UNESCO, UNESCO. UNESCO.
