= Zero Hunger Political Culture and Antipoverty Policy in Northeast Brazil =

2014 book by Aaron Ansell

- Author: Aaron Ansell
- Language: English
- Published: 2014
- Publisher: The University of North Carolina Press
- Publication place: United States
- Pages: 265
- Awards: Brazil Section Award: Latin American Studies Association
- ISBN: 1469613972

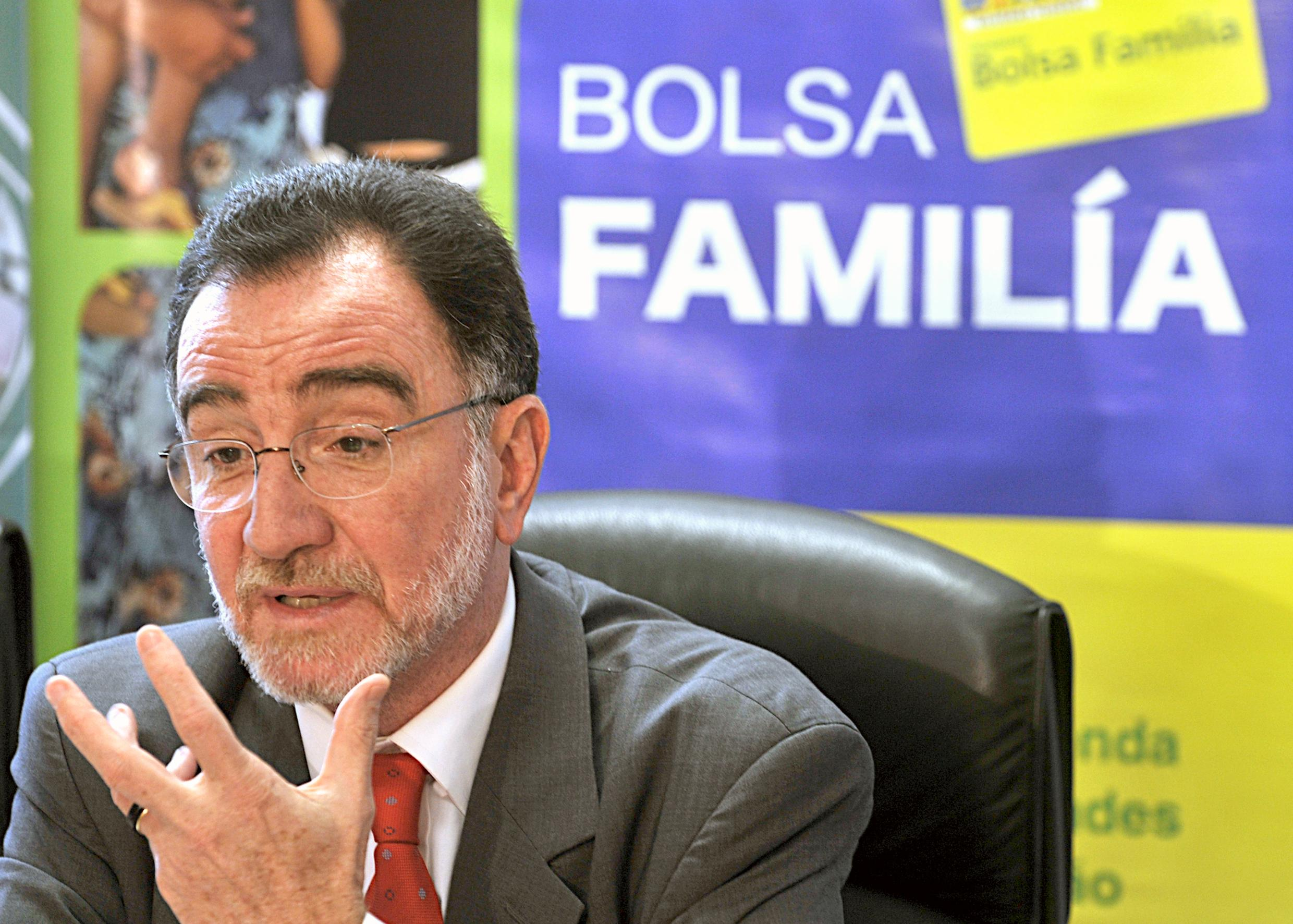
Brasília- The Minister of Social Development and Fight Against Hunger, Patrus Ananias, talks with journalists about the new monitoring system of Bolsa Família

Zero Hunger: Political Culture and Antipoverty Policy in Northeast Brazil is a book by anthropologist Aaron Ansell published by the University of North Carolina Press in 2014. The book traces the interactions between an activist state (the Workers' Party or Partido dos Trabalhadores) and a historically impoverished segment of the nation, offering an alternative to clientelism and universalism through the introduction of "intimate hierarchies," which note the unofficial relationship and exchanges between politicians and their constituencies that maintain aspects of agricultural life in Northeast Brazil. The book won the 2015 Brazil Section Book Award from the Latin American Studies Association.

== Synopsis ==
In this book, Ansell argues that Northeastern Brazil, under the PT, does not align with the traditional notions of clientelism or universalism, but instead has developed an unspoken system of “intimate hierarchies” that support a mutually beneficial socio-political system for politicians or elites and the impoverished citizens of Northeast Brazil.

Ansell is responding to the predominant literature on post-authoritarian Brazil that uses the concept of clientelism as a means for elites to maintain their status, and for inequality to remain static. This concept, and the arguments of its practice, limits social and economic mobility in Northeast Brazil, holding marginalized and impoverished populations in their current place. Ansell's contribution to the literature is the introduction of a new way to think about the relationship between the party and citizens which complicates the traditional notions of clientelism.

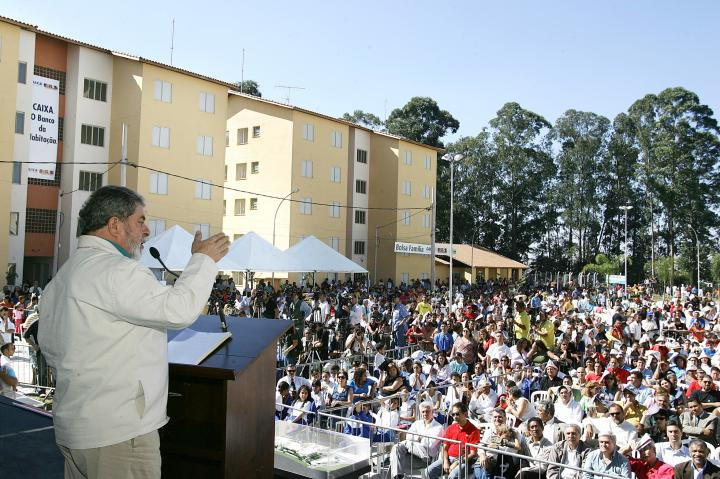
President Lula speaks during the ceremony of the Residential Lease Program - PAR, certificates of the Housing Allowance Program - PSH, and cards from the Bolsa Família Program

Three terms that are vitally important to this book are patronage, clientelism, and universalism. Patronage is the granting jobs, favors, or services to individuals or groups who support a political party or campaign. Clientelism is a social order that depends upon and stems from patronage, particularly in politics where it emphasizes or exploits such relations of granting favors for political support. Universalism is a system where goods and services are distributed not as favors for political support, but as rights for all individuals regardless of politics.

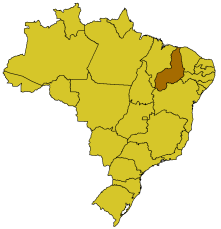
Piaui, Brazil

This book is an ethnography, which examines the attempts of PT activists to use the program Zero Hunger (Fome Zero) to assist poor agricultural workers in northeast Brazil. Ansell's research began in 2001 at the Workers’ Party headquarters in Rio and continued through extensive field research conducted in the early 2000s. Ansell engaged with PT activists tasked with convincing the local, poor, largely subsistence farmers of the merits of the federal government's social program. The programs these young PT activists were pushing are Zero Hunger and, later, Bolsa Família (Family Stipend Program). Zero Hunger originally comprised many different programs. Some of these included projects with livestock rearing and cash cards. The cards became a large part of the later project, Bolsa Família. The programs are designed to attempt to construct a shared identity rooted in ideas of emancipation, with the eventual goal of mobilizing poor agricultural workers to pressure municipal, state and federal governments into providing goods and services which PT activists framed as their rights.

According to Ansell, PT activists and government workers used three primary strategies in the attempt to convince northeastern Brazilians of the legitimacy and effectiveness of these programs. The first is what Ansell calls induced nostalgia, which is an attempt by PT activists to get local farmers to first conceptualize, then to reform and recreate the myth of the lost era of collective labour and consumption, which occurred before a reliance on clientelism. The second strategy used by PT activists was a strategy that Ansell refers to as Programmatic Pilgrimage. This strategy involved bussing large groups of subsistence farmers and agricultural workers to the state capital in Teresina. Here, they were encouraged to disregard their local and individual identities in exchange for a unification under the premise of a post-slavery ‘Quilombola’ past. The third strategy used by PT activists was one in which PT activists attempted to undermine the authority and command of local politicians, such as the mayor, by creating an independent and self-run committee that handled matters relating to the Zero Hunger program. The administration of the program was then, at least theoretically, free from regional politics and was controlled without the considerations and personal motivations of elites in localities.

Despite their efforts, Ansell argues that none of these strategies really worked. This forced PT activists to reevaluate their understandings of the relationships between political elites and agrarian workers. Ansell calls these relationships, or networks of relationships, ‘intimate hierarchies.’ As the name suggests, these relationships are not as strictly delineated as either clientelism or universalism, but rather serves as a middle way between the two. Thus, these relationships are not vote buying, or official exchanges of favors, goods, or services for political support, as are associated with clientelism. Rather they are the long-term, unbalanced, yet mutually beneficial agreements between political elites and the masses according to which gifts, favors, goods, or services are to be exchanged without official records or an expectation for exact calculations.

While these previous strategies were all fairly unsuccessful, Ansell notes that the PT activists did have some positive impacts on the region and the agrarian workers. First, livestock projects, which aided in the monetary and logistical complications of raising livestock, did assist the economic standing of farmers in the region. Second, activist involvement proved beneficial for women, as it shifted the patriarchal understanding of the household. Third, strategies like induced nostalgia and programmatic pilgrimage did assist in the formation of an understood community based in lower economic standing of the region, and its citizens, as a whole. And lastly, the emphasis of rights in the Zero Hunger Program shifted perceptions away from strict notions of clientelism to a heightened sense of mutual respect and long-term cooperation.

== Critical reception ==
Reviews of this book were completed by Stanley E. Blake in the Hispanic American Historical Review 95 (2015): 381-382. and Robert Gay in the Journal of Latin American Studies 47 (2015): 630-632. Stanley E. Blake (Ph.D., State University of New York, History, 2001) is a professor of history at the Ohio State University specializing in national identity in modern Brazilian and Latin American history. Robert Gay (Ph.D., Brown University, Sociology) is a professor of sociology at Connecticut College specializing in democracy, violence, and organized crime in Brazil.

Blake praises Ansell for his analysis of patronage through the use of rational choice theory in the establishment of the concept of “intimate hierarchies.” This analysis is seen to force a conversation among historians on assumptions regarding the relationship between rural Brazil's residents and their politicians and bureaucrats. Gay echos these praises, adding commendations for Ansell's grounding of clientelism and universalism in lived social and political experiences, rather than discussing them in the abstract. Additionally, Gay notes the use of multiple voices and a lack of emphasis on the author as an asset to the book's design and execution.

Unlike a lot of ethnographies, this is not one that is dominated by the author’s voice. On the contrary, throughout the book we get to hear from a wide variety of actors, from poor agricultural workers, to local politicians, to out of town administrators and activists. This is no small achievement in a community where being seen talking to one person can close off access to another. Ansell proves that he is a skilled ethnographer by the very fact that he can bring so many different voices to the table.

While Gay forgoes significant criticism, Blake is hesitant to fully embrace the analysis due to the use of anecdotal evidence and the lack of attention to long-term effects of the policies in question. Blake also notes that the anthropological account “would have benefited from a deeper engagement with the work of Brazilian labor historians who have demonstrated the ways in which workers further their own economic, social, and political interests by challenging and negotiating with employers, labor unions, and the state.”

== Awards ==
Zero Hunger won the 2015 Brazil Section Book Award from the Latin American Studies Association.
