= Conditional cash transfer =

Type of poverty reducing program

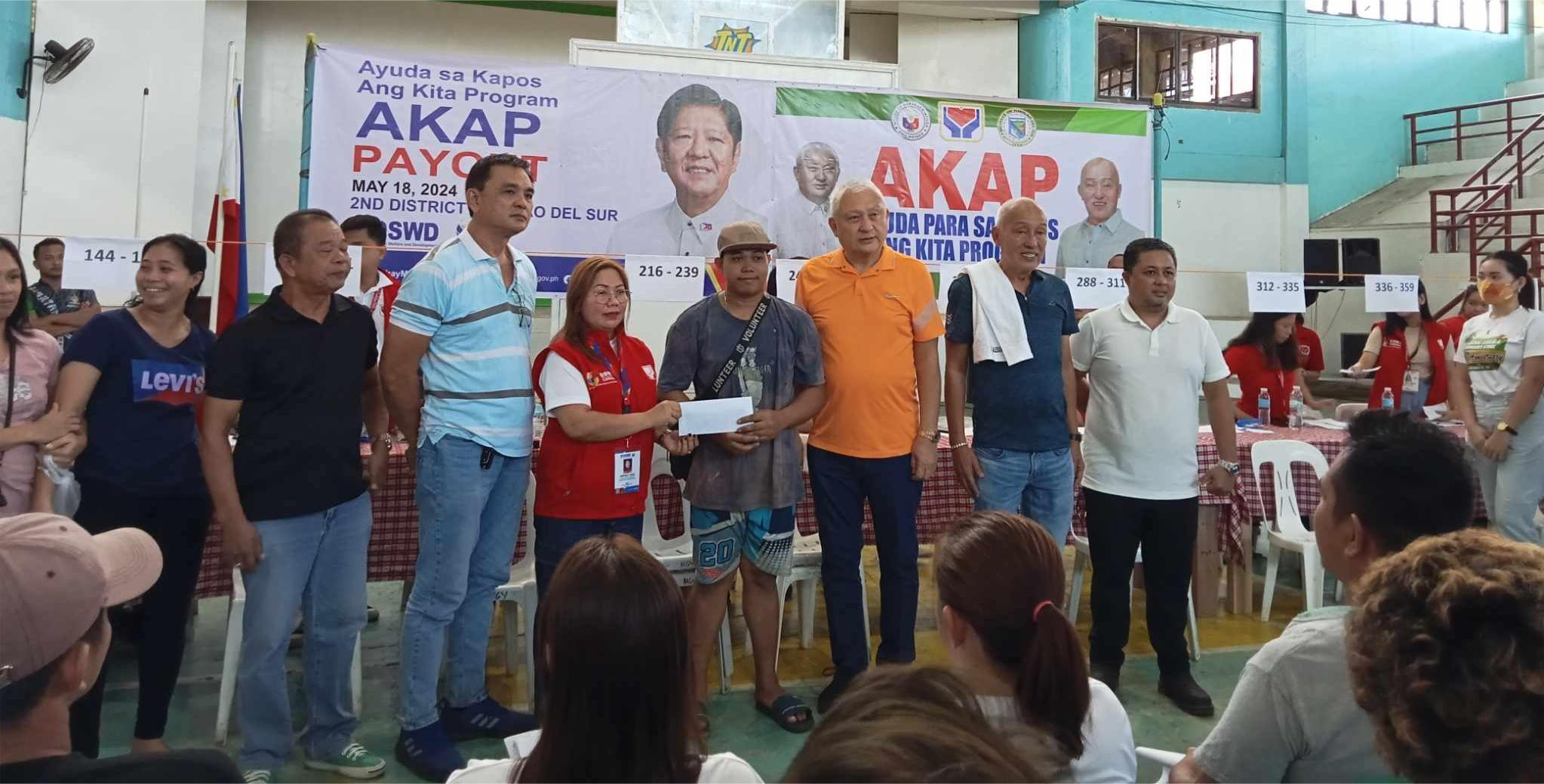
Payout of a conditional cash transfer program aimed at near-poor communities. ( Surigao del Sur, Philippines )

Conditional cash transfer (CCT) programs aim to reduce poverty by making cash transfers conditional upon the receivers' actions. The government (or a charity) only transfers the money to persons who meet certain criteria. These criteria may include enrolling children into public schools, getting regular check-ups at the doctor's office, receiving vaccinations, or the like. CCTs seek to help the current generation in poverty, as well as breaking the cycle of poverty for the next through the development of human capital. Conditional cash transfers could help reduce feminization of poverty.

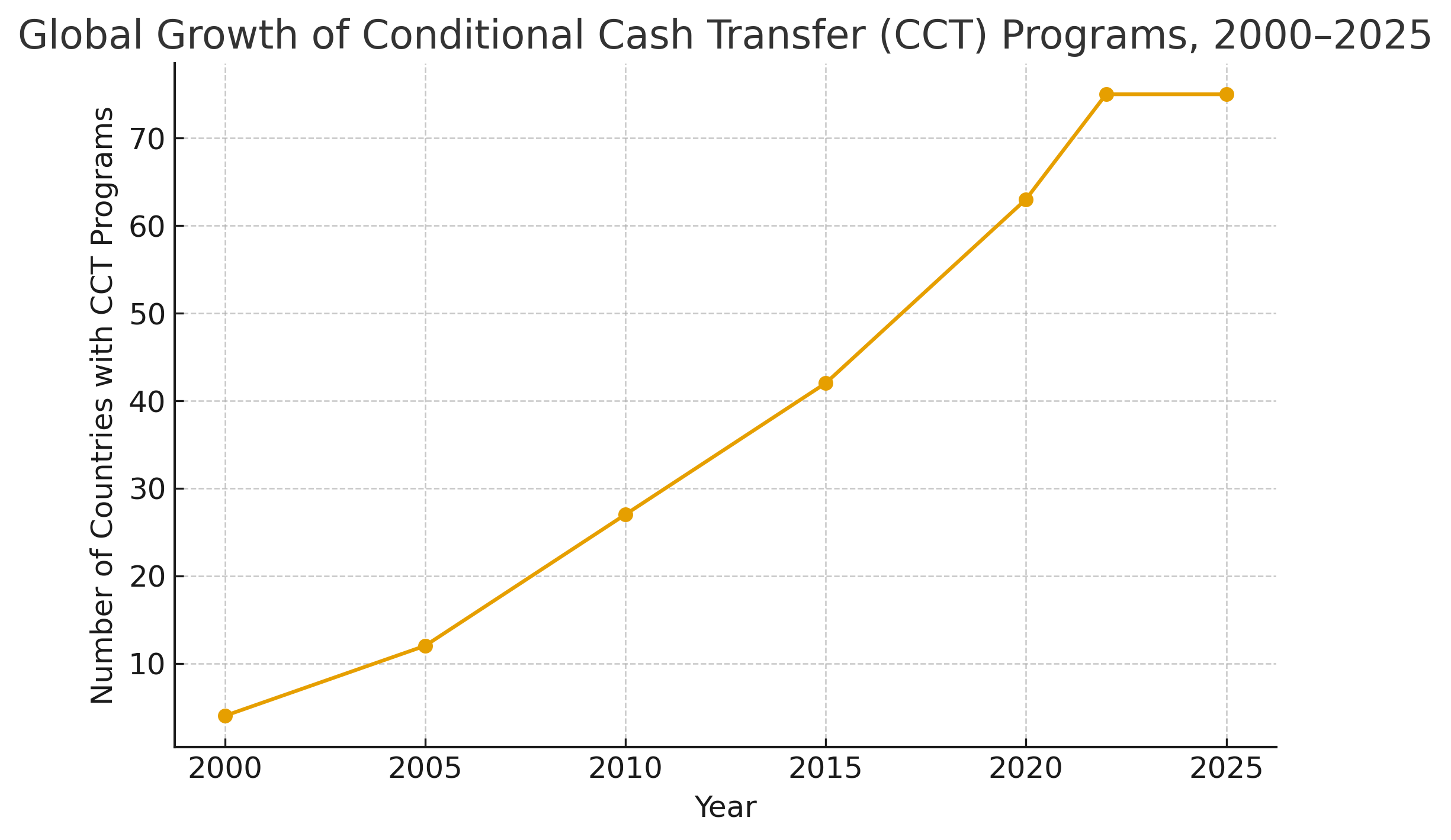
Growth of CCT worldwide from the 2020s to 2025s.

== Effectiveness ==
=== Short-term ===
Few development initiatives have been evaluated as rigorously as CCT programs. The implementation of conditional cash transfer programs has been accompanied by systematic efforts to measure their effectiveness and understand their broader impact on household behavior, a marked departure from the limited attention that was paid to rigorous impact evaluations in the past. Evaluation results are available for PROGRESA in Mexico, PETI in Brazil and the Atención a Crisis in Nicaragua. These evaluations reveal that conditional cash transfers can provide effective incentives for investing in the poor's human capital. A 2015 analysis by staff at Argentina's National Scientific and Technical Research Council estimated that the Universal Allocation per Child programme had increased school attendance for children between the ages of 15 and 17 by 3.9 percent.

CCTs have affected not only the overall level of consumption, but also the composition of consumption. There is evidence that households that receive CCTs spend more on food and, in the food basket, on higher-quality sources of nutrients than do households that do not receive the transfer but have comparable overall income or consumption levels.

In Bangladesh, Pakistan, and Turkey, where school enrollment rates among girls were lower than among boys, CCTs have helped reduce this gender gap.

CCTs have resulted in sizeable reductions in poverty among recipients—especially when the transfer has been sufficient, well targeted, and structured in a way that does not discourage recipients from taking other actions to escape poverty. Because CCTs provide a steady income, they have helped protect poor households from the worst effects of unemployment, catastrophic illness, and other sudden income shocks. And making cash transfers to women, as virtually all CCTs do, may have increased their bargaining power.

In the US, a paper by the Institute for Research on Poverty concluded in 2011:

Over time, we find that expenditures have shifted toward the disabled and the elderly, and away from those with the lowest incomes and toward those with higher incomes, with the consequence that post-transfer rates of deep poverty for some groups have increased. We conclude that the U.S. benefit system is paternalistic and tilted toward the support of the employed and toward groups with special needs and perceived deservingness.

A 2022 study in the Quarterly Journal of Economics found that CCT to newborns increased their educational outcomes and young adult earnings. The economic impact was large enough that "the transfer pays for itself through subsequent increases in federal income tax revenue".

=== Long-term Effects ===
Beyond the short-term effects of accessing cash, increasing consumption, schooling, and health expenditure, etc. CCTs also have long-term effects in different areas. Researchers have investigated how CCT affects households in the long term in terms of economic resilience. These studies examine whether early exposure to CCTs strengthens households’ ability to overcome future shocks and improves adult socioeconomic pathways. Additionally, CCT also improves these households’ intergenerational mobility. It generates positive spillover effects for the next generation. Lastly, CCT deeply benefits these households with positive health and demographic complementary effects.

==== Economic resilience of CCT ====
A study in 2025 used administrative data from Ecuador’s Human Development Grant(HDG) to track children with CCT into childhood, examining how prior exposure to the CCT influenced their education level, household income, and economic resilience during the COVID-19 pandemic. The study found that there are no robust effects across the entire sample, but it indicates that for these rural children exposed to CCT, the program increases 5-10 percentage points during COVID-19. This implies that the CCT improves the economic resilience of these households in the event of an economic shock in the future.

==== Intergenerational Spillover Effects of CCTs ====
Other studies focus on intergenerational mobility. Research across Latin America suggests that the children of CCT beneficiaries are more likely to enter and remain in school, even after their households leave the program. The research suggests that increasing educational attainment is associated with a reduction in intergenerational poverty among CCTs. CCTs enhance human capital accumulation across generations, leading to increased employment opportunities and improved economic stability in the future. Additionally, these children can gain cognitive skills, social skills, higher employment, and income in the future. Therefore, households receiving CCT can benefit their children in the future by gaining different skills and increasing the employment rate, which is a way of intergenerational spillover effects.

==== Health and Demographic Complementary Effects of CCTs ====
CCT has a long-term effect on increasing household spending on food and health care, especially for children. There are long-term improvements in childhood nutrition and health. This prevents children from suffering the diseases caused by malnutrition, such as lower stunting rates and higher adult height.

Furthermore, households exposed to CCT display a lower mortality rate for infants and neonates. A study from Barham focuses on Mexico’s Progresa, which is one of the largest CCT programs in the world. They compared the different outcomes for these households after receiving CCT. The indices are the mortality rate for infants (0–12 months) and neonates(0–28 days). The research resulted in a 11% decline in the infant mortality rate for the treatment group (after receiving the CCT). And a 2% decline in the neonate mortality rate, even though it is smaller than the 11%, is still significant. The mechanisms behind this are that cash enables households to afford better nutrition and health support. They can access various foods to ingest enough nutrients and support health clinic visits.

=== Medical applications ===
Modest financial incentives delivered in routine clinical practice have been found to significantly improve adherence to, and completion of, vaccination programmes.

=== Digitalization of CCT ===
In recent years, many CCT programs have employed digital payment systems to improve efficiency, reduce mistakes, and expand access for beneficiaries. There are some mobile money platforms, such as Kenya’s M-Pesa and India’s Aadhaar, that have enabled governments to transfer directly to verified recipients and minimize administrative delays. In a 2021 World Bank evaluation, it found that digital transfers in CCT reduced transaction costs by up to 40% and increased the reliability of payment delivery in rural areas.

The COVID-19 pandemic further accelerated the digitalization of CCT. Countries including Brazil, the Philippines, and Indonesia introduced emergency cash transfers, allowing for rapid coverage to these new vulnerable populations. Studies from 2020–2022 show that households receiving digital CCT were more likely to maintain school attendance and access health services than households relying on traditional in-person collection systems.

Despite these advantages, there are still some challenges, such as limited internet access, digital illiteracy, and inconsistent biological identification systems, to restrict the coverage of digital CCTs in low-income regions.

== Difficulties ==
Although the benefits of conditional cash transfer programs across the world have been widely noted, there remains a series of obstacles to their success that have caused some programs to be stunted or terminated completely.

=== External factors ===
According to a comprehensive study done by senior research analysts Laura Rawlings and Gloria Rubio of the World Bank, the beginning stages of program implementation present the challenge of creating a reliable implementation schedule. On many occasions, changes in political leadership, natural disasters, or changes in program administration have delayed the implementation schedule and lead to decreased efficiency or program termination.

An example of the negative outcomes of one such delay is provided by the UN Development Programme's in-depth study of the short-lived Nicaragua's Social Protection Network. According to the study, the movement of the program administration to the country's Ministry of the Family caused a delay in efficiency and resources that, among other factors, led to the program's termination. Delays can also be caused by difficulties in developing the program management information system (MIS).

One such delay in Mexico's Oportunidades program caused 27% of its targeted population not to receive any transfers after two years of implementation.

In addition to unscheduled delays, other external factors that can hinder a CCT's success pertain to unexpected financial crisis. According to a comprehensive assessment provided by the World Bank, the structure of conditional cash transfer programs has not yet been adjusted to retain success in the event of a large financial crisis.

Primarily, conditional cash transfer programs are not flexible enough to extend benefits to households that fall into the program's targeted population only during economic downturns. Thus, those not normally covered by the program's benefits may be harder hit than those who are but will not be able to be assisted.

=== Exclusion ===
Another common obstacle to success in most CCTs is exclusion of needy homes in the targeting process. In an assessment by the World Bank, much exclusion was due to remote communities' inability to access schools or clinics. Many such communities fall into developing countries' most poverty-stricken populations but cannot follow through with conditionalities since the transportation costs to attend schools or hospital visits outweigh the benefits. Furthermore, an evaluation of Mexico's Progresa-Oportunidades program addresses the issue that those in poverty with debilitating illnesses can be excluded from CCTs due to their physical inability to accomplish the conditionalities.

Exclusion has been noted by both the World Bank study and the Progresa-Oportunidades evaluation evident in community-based targeting and self-targeting approaches. In the case of self-targeting, used by Mexico's Progresa-Oportunidades, working women may be excluded from the program because they are unable to miss work to register or accomplish all conditions. In the case of community-based targeting, the World Bank study notes that the extremely poor who may live in generally middle-class communities will be excluded.

=== Distrust ===
Targeted populations' distrust of the program due to lack of adequate information has been noted by at least three case studies to be a leading factor in the CCT programs' downfalls. The extensive study by the UN Development Programme on Nicaragua's Social Protection Network (RPS) reveals that the level of distrust of the program was so high that a domestic publicity campaign could have possibly saved the RPS from extinction. This high level of domestic distrust was due, in part, to efforts to politicize the program.

One report addressed in the UN Development Programme's study stated that RPS employees were approached by members of the government, who demanded that half their salaries be donated to the party in power. Although the RPS was successful in avoiding the threats, it was later revealed that the RPS was the only Nicaraguan institution of its kind not making government contributions.

This same level of distrust is reflected in a study on the feasibility of a Haitian CCT made by the International Food Policy Research Institute. In the focus group they interviewed, almost all subjects expressed a "profound lack of faith" in the Haitian government. Instead, they preferred that the conditional cash transfer programs be implemented by community committees or NGOs.

However, this distrust in governments' ability to fairly implement CCTs fairly is not strictly limited to developing countries. In an article in The New York Times addressing the termination of the pilot CCT, Opportunity NYC, the committee leader of one of its lending institutions stated that people were distrustful and confused by the program's intricacies. New York City's deputy mayor for health and human services added that many busy and stressed households were not being able to handle the many conditions they had to complete since they were not efficiently educated about the program.

== Unconditional versus conditional cash transfers ==
There have been discussions about whether imposing conditions is necessary or important for a cash transfer program. Research, such as the pilot conditional cash transfer program in Indonesia called Generasi, examined the importance of conditionality. One report looks at data from Mexico's Oportunidades/Progresa program, which looks at families who accidentally did not receive forms that monitor school attendance and therefore received unconditional cash transfers. It then compares them with those households that did receive the forms. It was shown that conditionality had the strongest impact on children's attendance to secondary school, as enrollment rates in secondary school were higher for those that received the forms.

Another report on an experiment in Malawi is researching the importance of conditionality among families with school-age girls. The program was conducted, with data collected between October 2007 and June 2010. It was found that the treatment arm providing conditional cash transfer programs had higher enrollment rates, as well as higher scores in independently administered tests of cognitive ability, mathematics and English reading comprehension. However, the UCT treatment arm had a much lower incidence of pregnancy and marriage among school-age girls.

A strong argument against the conditionality of social cash transfers is proposed by proponents of a rights-based approach to development. From a human rights perspective, cash transfers are a means to ensure the human rights to social protection and an adequate standard of living for all members of society, including first and foremost the fundamental right to food. States have the duty to ensure those rights with a maximum of available resources. While reducing poverty in general, conditional cash transfers have shown to often exclude those who need it the most, violating the human rights principle of non-discrimination and equality.

The following program in Malawi is an example of an unconditional cash transfer:

The Mchinji Pilot Social Cash Transfer Scheme is part of the larger Malawi Social Protection Policy and Framework, and began in April 2006. It is mainly financed by UNICEF and the National AIDS Commission. The objectives of the scheme are to reduce poverty of people in the pilot area who are ultra poor and labor constrained, increase school enrolment and attendance, and to generate information regarding the feasibility of a cash transfer program as part of a Social Protection Programme for Malawi. The goal for this program is to reduce the ultra poverty rate from the 22% rate in 2007 to 10% by 2015.

This program targets those households that are ultra poor (See poverty for definition) and those who are labor constrained, defined as either a household in which no able-bodied members 19–64 can work due to chronic sickness or disability or a household with one-able bodied member that has to care for more than three dependents. About 22% of Malawi as of 2007 was ultra-poor, living on less than 20 cents a day, and of that group 10% are labor constrained.

The program would give anywhere from 600 kwacha ($4 US) monthly for a one-person household to 1800 kwacha ($13 US) monthly for a four or more person family. There is also an extra bonus of 200 kwacha for children enrolled in primary school and 400 kwacha for children enrolled in secondary school. The location for the program is in the Mchinji District, the 14th poorest district out of 28 in Malawi.

It was chosen for its average poverty level of all the districts in Malawi and its proximity to the capital, Lilongwe.

The first comprehensive systematic review of evidence on health effects of cash transfers found that the relative effectiveness of conditional and unconditional cash transfers remains very uncertain. The review found only three studies that compared conditional cash transfers with unconditional ones directly, and it recommended additional randomized controlled trials of conditional compared with unconditional cash transfers.

== Projects by country ==
Conditional cash transfers have been used in many countries.

=== Africa ===
While most conditional cash transfer programs are in Latin America, a significant amount of research has been conducted regarding the implementation of these programs in Africa. In addition, programs are looking to the Latin America for examples on how to implement these programs. While there are a few unconditional cash transfer programs in Africa being tested, two conditional cash transfer programs in Africa are currently being implemented. For CCTs to be successful, they require sufficient infrastructure. Poor education and health systems limit the benefits of CCT programs. Impacts should be seen in regard to the effectiveness of health and education institutions of the country.

==== Egypt ====
The program Minhet El-Osra began in 2009, and was piloted in an urban slum in Cairo, Ain Es-Sira, and 65 villages in rural Upper Egypt by the Egyptian Ministry of Social Solidarity.

==== Morocco ====
Since 2007 a pilot conditional cash transfer program has been researching its effectiveness in Morocco, organized by the World Bank. The program targets poor regions of Morocco with high dropout rates and should cover 160,000 households by 2010. The pilot program is a comparative test that has four treatment groups. One group is receiving unconditional cash transfers, regardless of child school attendance. The next three are given conditional cash transfers to families of children grades 3-6 based on the child's attendance at school.

The three treatment groups vary in how attendance is monitored, ranging from monitoring attendance based on teacher's report, all the way to a sophisticated system involving monitoring through biometric fingerprint machines.

In addition, within each classroom, which parent (the mother or father) is randomized to see if the family benefits more from having the money targeted to one or the other. This study will bring research that assesses the importance of conditionality, monitoring, and targeting within a conditional cash transfer program.

==== Nigeria ====
New Incentives provides cash transfers conditioned on children's vaccination. As of 2024, it is one of GiveWell's top four recommended charities.

==== Sierra Leone ====
Research has been carried out by the Overseas Development Institute into the challenges of implementing cash transfers in Sierra Leone and in ensuring their success. After a decade of conflict over 70% of the population lives in poverty and over 25% in extreme poverty (defined as being unable to achieve the bare minimum nutritional food intake). Given the poverty and the high levels of fragmentation in society, cash transfer schemes have been small scale to date, but include:

- Meeting immediate income needs;
- Putting cash into the community and stimulating the local economy; and
- Empowering people by enabling autonomous decision-making over expenditure.

Any expansion of the system has to take into account:

- The risk (both real and perceived) of dependency
- Infrastructure
- Institutional capacity
- Risk of corruption
- Affordability

Researchers at the Overseas Development Institute found that the perceived risk of dependency was very high and that transfers of tools, sewing machines, or agricultural inputs have proved to be more popular. Furthermore, organisations such as the World Food Programme were of the belief that giving food, instead of cash, in payment for public works was more culturally relevant, in an area where workers had traditionally been paid this way. Yet the actual risk of dependency proved to be far less than feared. The research has also shown that despite poor infrastructure, administering cash transfers has not presented as great a challenge as expected. Informal networks have ensured cash is flowing from the urban to rural areas, even if by hand, and local councils and schools far from the capital are now also receiving payment through bank accounts and not in cash. The same goes for institutional capacity which is widely believed to be improving.

Corruption in Sierra Leone continues to pose a serious challenge and the country ranked only 142 out of 163 in Transparency International's 2006 rankings. Cash transfers are no more prone to corruption than other sources of government spending, yet specific parts of the process of implementation must be carefully monitored. Affordability is argued to be low. Total government expenditure on social protection was budgeted at around US$1.5 million in 2006 and US$2.8 million in 2007 and social protection expenditure is estimated at around 1.5% to 2.5% of non-salary, non-interest recurrent government expenditure, 0.3–0.6% of total government expenditure and a small fraction of a percentage of GDP.

==== South Africa ====
In South Africa unconditional cash transfer and social assistance spending amounts to approximately US$20-billion per annum or 15.2% of its total Governmental expenditure (while the country has a GDP of only US$368-billion). The number of individual programme beneficiaries totalled 17.5-million in 2018 (76.1% of its total labour force), compared to Bolsa Família in Brazil which has 12-million families as beneficiary

The impact on the country's labour force participation has been found to be "ambiguous and dependent on a number of factors", according to the Southern African Labour and Development Research Unit, while "education and health-care conditions attached to many transfers can also increase human capital formation and therefore create a long-term positive impact on labour market participation".

=== Asia ===
==== Bangladesh ====
The Female Secondary School Assistance Project was established in 1994. This CCT program, conditional only on school attendance and girls remaining unmarried, provides tuition and stipends.

==== Cambodia ====
Cambodia Education Sector Support Project, established in 2005, is conditional on attendance and maintaining passing grades.

==== Indonesia ====
===== Bantuan Langsung Tunai =====
Bantuan Langsung Tunai (lit. 'Direct Cash Assistance') was implemented by Indonesian president Susilo Bambang Yudhoyono in 2005.

===== Program Indonesia Pintar =====
In 2018, Program Indonesia Pintar (PIP) was launched, which has a focus of helping the government meet its constitutional guarantees by providing incentives for all children to complete at least a 9-year basic education.

===== Program Keluarga Harapan =====
Program Keluarga Harapan (PKH) is a household CCT program established in 2007. It is focused on reducing poverty, maternal mortality, and child mortality and providing universal coverage of basic education.

===== Program Nasional Pemberdayaan Masyarakat-Generasi Sehat dan Cerdas =====
Program Nasional Pemberdayaan Masyarakat-Generasi Sehat dan Cerdas is a community-based CCT program established in 2007. Similar to PKH, PNPM is focused on reducing poverty, maternal mortality, and child mortality and providing universal coverage of basic education.

==== Philippines ====
===== Ayuda sa Kapos ang Kita Program =====
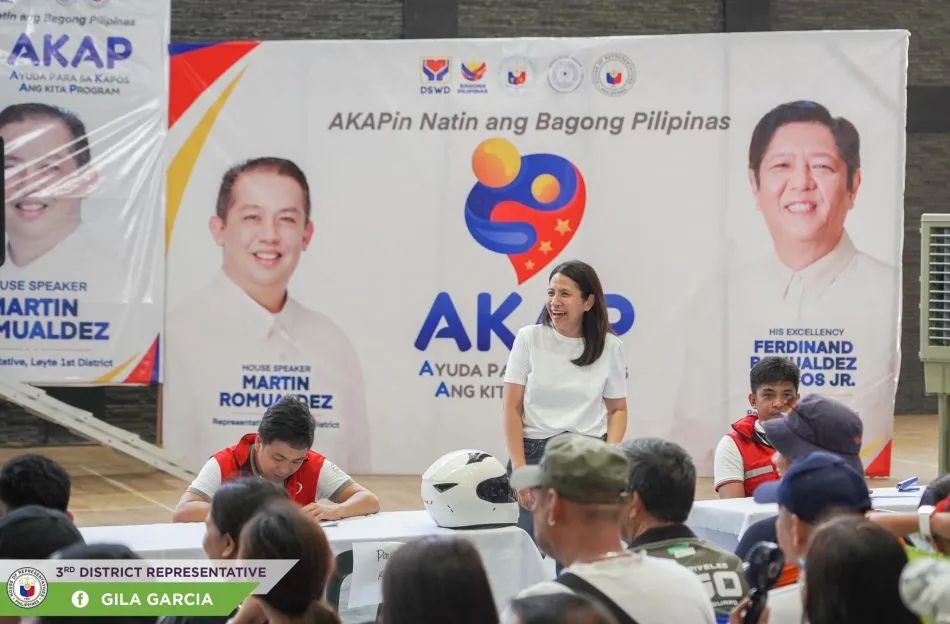
A member of the House of Representatives of the Philippines headlines a mass distribution of financial assistance under the Ayuda sa Kapos ang Kita conditional cash transfer program.

The Ayuda sa Kapos ang Kita Program (often referred to by the acronym AKAP which is from the Tagalog word pag-akap - to embrace, accept, integrate ) was established in December 2023 and launched in February 2024 by the Department of Social Welfare and Development to assist the near-poor segment of the population, responding to the economic difficulties of Filipinos earning minimum wage who are vulnerable to economic shocks such as runaway inflation that can easily send them back into poverty.

====== Criticism ======
On February 13, several senators questioned a new ₱26.7 billion cash assistance program of the Department of Social Welfare and Development (DSWD) named "Ayuda sa Kapos ang Kita Program" (AKAP), which they described as a "foreign project". DSWD Undersecretary for Legislative affairs Fatima Aliah Dimaporo said the project was also "just as foreign" to the DSWD and that the project was not part of the original budget proposal for 2024 from Malacañang. Senator Imee Marcos said she learned about the program from a congressman who sent her a text message saying "All soft projects including AKAP must go through the Office of the Speaker. AKAP, AICS, TUPAD, MAIP for the PI and other efforts". Senator Sonny Angara, chair of the Senate finance committee, said the AKAP program was initiated by the House. In response, House appropriations chairman Elizaldy Co, said Imee Marcos was tarnishing the good intention of the program.

AKAP has been linked to the political ambitions of Martin Romualdez, Speaker of the House of Representatives of the Philippines, during the presidency of Bongbong Marcos. Economist JC Punongbayan argued that the selection process, due to their control by representatives' district offices, has led to multiple cash leakages, with barangay officials prioritizing relatives and friends in the handing out of benefits, leading to nonpoor and undeserving people receiving benefits. He also points to legislators such as Romualdez hosting mass distributions of cash transfers "like a gameshow host giving out prizes in a noontime show" and their allies' crediting longstanding Department of Labor and Employment and congressional leaders as evidence of patronage politics. The City Post claimed that AKAP and similar programs blur the line between governance and vote-buying; It also excoriated legislative bodies that usurp the functions of the executive branch and frowns on legislators that use cash transfer programs to promote their candidacies in future elections.

During the 2025 election campaigns, Vote Report PH said that incumbent officials used AKAP to endorse candidates or party-list groups, alleging the misuse of public resources.

===== Other conditional cash transfers initiated by the Bongbong Marcos administration =====
Punongbayan further listed four other ayuda projects established under Bongbong Marcos: the Start-up Investment Business and Livelihood Program (SIBOL), Cash Assistance and Rice Distribution (CARD), the Integrated Scholarships and Incentives Program (ISIP) for the Youth, and the Farmer's Assistance for Recovery and Modernization (FARM). According to the government, SIBOL was established to provide cash assistance for micro, small, and medium-sized enterprises and individuals seeking better employment opportunities; CARD aims to alleviate the burden on indigent families of high prices of rice (which Romualdez referred to as "a staple on every Filipino's diet") by providing financial assistance and affordable rice; while ISIP provides financial assistance and opportunities to disadvantaged but deserving students.

====== Criticism ======
Punongbayan argued that these other projects served the same purpose of creating political patronage networks. These cash transfers have been distributed through mass gatherings held by local politicians collectively labeled the Bagong Pilipinas Serbisyo Fair.

===== Pantawid Pamilyang Pilipino Program of 2019 =====
Pantawid Pamilyang Pilipino Program (4Ps; lit. 'Bridging Program for the Filipino Family') is a conditional cash transfer program of the Philippine government administered by the Department of Social Welfare and Development (DSWD). It aims to reduce extreme poverty in the Philippines by investing in health and education, particularly for children aged 0–18. The program was modeled after similar conditional cash transfer programs in other developing countries, such as Brazil (Bolsa Família) and Mexico (Oportunidades). As of June 25, 2024, the program operates in 17 regions, 79 provinces, 1,484 municipalities, and 143 cities, covering 4,090,667 household beneficiaries.

The program was institutionalized through Republic Act No. 11310, which was signed into law by President Rodrigo Duterte in April 2019.

=== Europe ===
Conditional cash transfer programs are not used widely in Europe. In the UK, in 2011 CentreForum, proposed an additional child benefit dependent on parenting activities.

United Kingdom

Conditional cash transfers are also being tested to address homelessness and housing insecurity. In the United Kingdom, the Centre for Homelessness Impact launched a randomised controlled trial evaluating the impact of personalised budgets for individuals with experience of rough sleeping or temporary accommodation. The trial compares outcomes for a treatment group receiving a conditional cash transfer with those for a control group receiving usual support services. The study aims to assess whether direct, conditional, financial support influences housing stability, wellbeing, financial security and related outcomes. The project involves delivery partners across regions of England and is independently evaluated by King’s College London and IFF Research. Results are expected to contribute to evidence on the role of direct cash transfers as a policy intervention for people experiencing homelessness.

==== Malta ====
===== Children's Allowance =====
Children's Allowance is awarded to married couples, civil union couples, cohabiting couples, single parents, separated parents or returned emigrants, having the care and custody of their children under 16 years of age and whose total annual income of relevant year two years prior to current year from employment is less than €27,434.

==== Turkey ====
In Turkey, Şartlı Nakit Transferi (ŞNT), Şartlı Eğitim Yardımları (ŞEY) and Şartlı Sağlık Yardımları (ŞSY) were established in 2003, implemented by the General Directorate of Social Assistance (GDSA; Turkish: Sosyal Yardımlar Genel Müdürlüğü), under the umbrella of Ministry of Family and Social Services. These CCT programs have been implemented by GDSA since 2003 with education and health components in which almost ₺6 billion (approx. €2 billion) have been spent to about 3.5 million beneficiary households. In order to be paid regularly in CCT program, students (ages 5–20) have to attend to their school regularly and children (ages 0–6) have to be taken to health centres regularly. All the conditions are being monitored by GDSA from the databases of the Ministry of Health and the Ministry of National Education by the means of an interactive web-based MIS.

The conditional education grants are provided to children of the target group on school enrollment condition, from the first grade through the end of the twelfth grade. Once qualified as beneficiaries, children should maintain at least 80 per cent attendance rate to continue to receive the grant.

Individual payment amounts differ according to components. Girls are paid higher amounts than boys in education component to encourage poor families to send their daughters to school. Besides, due to increasing drop-out rates in higher grades, secondary school (9th–12th grades) students are paid higher amounts than primary school ones in order to ensure the effect of the program on decreasing the drop-out rates.

The project named "Strengthening the Impact of the Conditional Cash Transfer Programme in Turkey for Increasing High School Attendance" (Turkish: Liseye Devam Senden, Destek Bizden) has been started up in December 2014 by GDSA through EU co-finance. The project has been integrated to Turkey's CCT implementation and designed for high school CCT beneficiaries in order to ensure them to get a degree and decrease early school leaving rates which also is one of the most important topics for 2020 European Union targets for a sustainable growth.

In the scope of the project, extra incentives were added into CCT education programme aiming to support high school education attendance which would provide stronger reinforcement for the CCT families. Grants (€60 in 2014 and €70 in 2015 for each eligible student) is provided for parents (preferably mothers) of high school (9th, 10th and 11th grades and 12th for 2015) CCT beneficiaries suffering from lack of financial resources to cover educational expenditures especially in the beginning of each year.

=== Latin America ===
Many countries in Latin America are now using CCT programs as a major tool of their social policy since they have been proven to be very effective in helping poor families. By 2011 CCTs had spread to 18 countries in the region and covered as many as 129 million beneficiaries. Although the conditions and amounts of money may vary from country to country, ranging from $5 to $33 per child, in general these programs provide money to poor families under the condition that those transfers are used as an investment on their children's human capital, such as regular school attendance and basic preventive health care. The purpose of these programs is to address the inter-generational transmission of poverty and to foster social inclusion by targeting the poor, focusing on children, delivering transfers to women, and changing social accountability relationships between beneficiaries, service providers and governments. Most of these transfer schemes are now benefiting around 110 million people in the region, and are considered relatively cheap, costing around 0.5% of their GDP.

Conditional cash transfer programs can be very effective in reducing poverty in the short term since they have helped to increase household income and consumption in poor families. They have also worked effectively in increasing school enrollment and attendance, especially in middle school. A substantial improvement in health and nutrition of the children that benefit from these programs has been acknowledged. However, studies by the UNDP have shown that conditional cash transfers neither represented a significant increase in the quality of education and in learning nor significant increased salaries, once the recipients entered the labor force.

Most CCT programs are very well-targeted and effective in reaching the poor and the excluded groups, notably the extreme poor living outside the reach of social protection programs tied with formal sector employment. On average, 80% of the benefits go to the 40% poorest families. The programs have also promoted equality of gender since they provide larger funds to girls since they often drop out earlier, so it has increased their enrollment and attendance to secondary levels of education. In the long run, these investments may also yield to significant changes in women's empowerment and insertion in economic networks.

==== Argentina ====
Universal Allocation Per Child (Spanish: Asignación universal por hijo) is a social security program in Argentina. It pays a monthly subsidy to families for each child under 18 or disabled. Despite the name, it is not yet a universal program, and currently applies only to families who do not have a regular reported income. A plan is in place to enlarge the scope of the program.

It was established in 2009 by a Necessity and Urgency Decree, signed by president Cristina Fernández de Kirchner. A conditional cash transfer programme, eligibility for the scheme was focused on families without formal employment and earning less than the minimum wage who ensured their children attended school, received vaccines and underwent health checks. By 2013 it covered over two million poor families, and by 2015 it covered 29 percent of all Argentinian children. A 2015 analysis by staff at Argentina's National Scientific and Technical Research Council estimated that the programme had increased school attendance for children between the ages of 15 and 17 by 3.9 percent.

==== Brazil ====
Bolsa Família (formerly Bolsa Escola) started in the 1990s and expanded rapidly in 2001 and 2002. It provides monthly cash payments to poor households if their school-aged children (between the ages of 6 and 15) are enrolled in school, and if their younger children (under age 6) have received vaccinations. Over the years, the Brazilian cash transfer program has incrementally expanded its beneficiary base through administrative and institutional improvements.

==== Chile ====
Chile Solidario, established in 2002, requires the family to sign a contract to meet 53 specified minimum conditions seen as necessary to overcome extreme poverty. In exchange, they receive from the state psychosocial support, protection bonds, guaranteed cash subsidies, and preferential access to skill development, work and social security programs.

==== Colombia ====
Familias en Acción, established in 2002, is a conditional cash transfer program, very similar to the Mexican PROGRESA/Oportunidades, consisting of cash transfers to poor families conditional on children attending school and meeting basic preventive health care requirements.

==== Guatemala ====
Mi Familia Progresa, established April 16, 2008, is a conditional cash transfer program that is intended to provide financial support to families living in poverty and extreme poverty and who have children age 0 to 15 years and/or pregnant women or nursing mothers who live mainly in rural and marginal areas of the peripheries of urban centers (cities).

==== Honduras ====
The Family Allowance Program (PRAF II) created in 1998 was based on the PRAF I program created in 1990. The Family Allowance Program, PRAF, founded in 1990 as a social compensation program of the government of the Republic of Honduras.

==== Mexico ====
Oportunidades is the principal anti-poverty program of the Mexican government (the original name of the program was Progresa, but it was changed in 2002). Oportunidades focuses on helping poor families in rural and urban communities invest in human capital—improving the education, health, and nutrition of their children. The Progresa program was one of the first large-scale conditional cash transfer programs.

==== Nicaragua ====
The Social Protection Network, established in 2000 and implemented by the Social Emergency Fund (FISE), was terminated in 2005.

==== Panama ====
Red de Oportunidades is a program implemented by the Government of Panama to the population under 18 to provide them access to health services and education.

==== Peru ====
Juntos was established in 2005. The program provides a monthly dividend to mothers (married or single) living in extreme poverty. Mothers can only qualify for the program if they send their children to school and take them for regular medical checkups.

=== North America ===
==== Jamaica ====
The Programme of Advancement Through Health and Education (PATH), administered by the Ministry of Labour and Social Security, is a conditional cash transfer programme. It provides cash transfers to poor families, who are subject to comply with conditions that promote the development of the human capital of their members. PATH was created in 2001, as part of a wide-ranging reform of the welfare system carried out by the government of Jamaica.

==== United States ====
===== Opportunity NYC =====
Opportunity NYC was an experimental conditional cash transfer program (CCT) by the Mayor of New York City, Michael Bloomberg. Announced in April 2007, it was the first CCT program to be launched in the United States. Its initial phases were funded by a number of private partners including the Rockefeller Foundation, Robin Hood Foundation, the Open Society Institute, Starr Foundation, AIG, and Mayor Bloomberg's own Bloomberg Family Foundation. The program is being evaluated by MDRC, a nonprofit research firm, using a random assignment research design. Opportunity NYC was administered by Seedco, a nonprofit community development organization. The program ended on 31 August 2010.

===== Social Security =====
In the United States, Social Security is the commonly used term for the federal Old-Age, Survivors, and Disability Insurance (OASDI) program and is administered by the Social Security Administration (SSA). The Social Security Act was passed in 1935, and the existing version of the Act, as amended, encompasses several social welfare and social insurance programs.

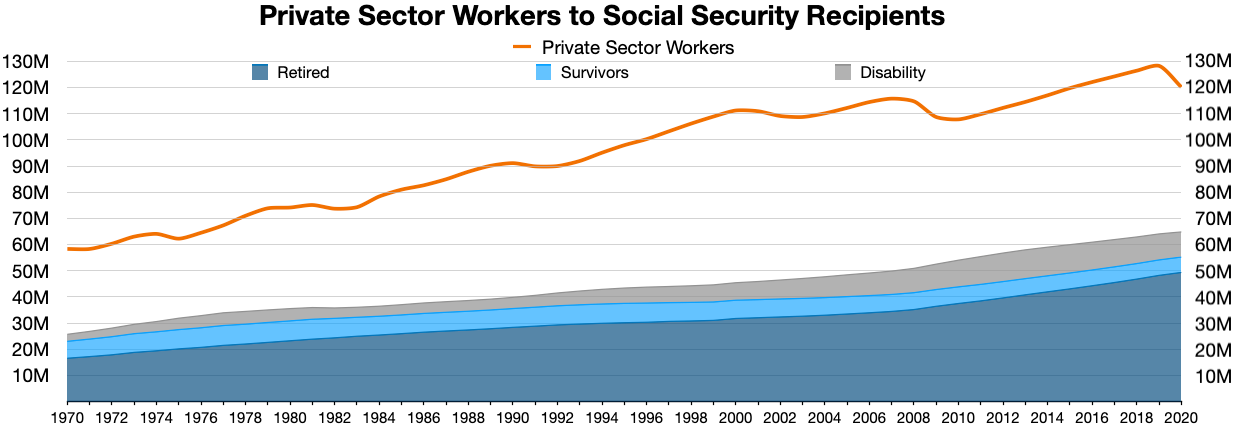
Private sector workers relative to social benefit recipients Private sector workers Disability recipients Survivors benefits Retired Social Security

===== Temporary Assistance for Needy Families =====
Temporary Assistance for Needy Families (TANF /tænɪf/) is a federal assistance program of the United States. It began on July 1, 1997, and succeeded the Aid to Families with Dependent Children (AFDC) program, providing cash assistance to indigent American families through the Administration for Children and Families, a division of the United States Department of Health and Human Services. TANF is often regarded as just "welfare", but some argue this is a misnomer. Unlike AFDC, which provided a guaranteed cash benefit to eligible families, TANF is a block grant to states that creates no federal entitlement to welfare and is used by states to provide non-welfare services, including educational services, to employed people.

== See also ==
- Cash and Voucher Assistance
- Cash transfers (Transfer payments)
- Means test
- Unconditional basic income

Specific programs:

- Universal allocation per child
- Bolsa Família
- Oportunidades
- Opportunity NYC
- Social Protection Network
- Pantawid Pamilyang Pilipino Program - Philippine implementation of CCT
- New Incentives
