= John Hoddinott (economist) =

Canadian economist

John Hoddinott (born 11 October 1961), is a Canadian economist and the Howard Edward Babcock Professor of Food, Nutrition and Public Policy at Cornell University. In 2002–2015, Hoddinott was a Deputy Division Director at the International Food Policy Research Institute. Since 1997, he has been a research associate at the Centre for the Study of African Economies at the University of Oxford. Hoddinott received his DPhil in 1989 from Oxford University.

== Biography ==
Hoddinott grew up in Toronto, Canada. He obtained his bachelor's degree in economics at the University of Toronto in 1984 and MA in economics in 1986 at York University in Canada. Hoddinott received his DPhil in 1989 from Oxford University. After working in different positions at Oxford, in 1997 Hoddinott moved to Washington DC to begin working for the International Food Policy Research Institute where he worked as a senior research fellow for more than ten years. In 2015, Hoddinott was honoured with the Howard Edward Babcock Professor of Food, Nutrition and Public Policy at Cornell University. Hoddinott has performed editorial duties for the Journal African Economies, Economics and Human Biology and Food Security. He has also served in the editorial boards of the Agricultural and Resource Economics Review, the Journal of Development Studies and the Oxford Development Studies.

== Research ==
Hoddinott's research has focused on understanding poverty, hunger and undernutrition in low-income countries. Hoddinott has published 8 books, more than 40 book chapters and more than 80 peer-reviewed journal articles. According to IDEAS/RePEc, he belongs to the top 5% of highest ranked economists in the world.

Hoddinott's PhD work focused on theoretical and empirical modelling of remittance and migration flows in Western Kenya. After this, much of his research work revolved around theoretical and empirical issues related to intra-household resource allocation in developing countries. One of the key insights from this work was that raising women's share of cash income within households was associated with increased budget share for food and reduced budget shares for alcohol and cigarettes.

Another major theme of Hoddinott's research is the long-term consequences of child under-nutrition. This work is informed by two-decade-long longitudinal surveys conducted in Zimbabwe and Guatemala where young children were followed until their adulthood. In Zimbabwe, Hoddinott together with Harold Alderman and Bill Kinsey found that nutritional status in early childhood was a strong predictor of attained height and schooling in early adulthood. In Guatemala, individuals who were exposed to a nutritional intervention in early childhood some 20-years earlier had higher wages than individuals who were not exposed to this intervention. Together these studies suggest that improvements in early childhood nutrition can shape long-term economic outcomes in low-income countries. Reflecting these ideas, in 2004, Hoddinott together with Jere Behrman and Harold Alderman authored a report for the Copenhagen Consensus that attempted to quantify the economic costs of hunger and malnutrition. The report concluded that investments in programs or policies to reduce hunger and malnutrition are likely to have high rates of return.

Hoddinott has also done extensive research on evaluating social safety net programs in low and middle income countries. These include evaluations of the PROGRESA program in Mexico (now called Oportunidades), Bolsa Familia in Brazil and the Productive Safety Net Programme in Ethiopia. Hoddinott has also extensively studied various design aspects of social safety net programs, especially on issues related to targeting and payment modalities.

== Selected bibliography ==
=== Books ===
- Haddad, Lawrence J.; Hoddinott, John; Alderman, Harold (1997). Intrahousehold resource allocation in developing countries: models, methods, and policy. Baltimore: Johns Hopkins University Press. ISBN 978-0-8018-5572-6.
- Coady, David; Grosh, Margareth; Hoddinott, John (2004). Targeting of transfers in developing countries: Review of lessons and experience. Washington D.C.: The World Bank. ISBN 978-0-8213-5769-9.

=== Journal articles ===
- Hoddinott, John; Haddad, Lawrence (February 1995). "Does female income share influence household expenditures? Evidence from Côte d'Ivoire". Oxford Bulletin of Economics and Statistics. 57: 77–96. doi:10.1111/j.1468-0084.1995.tb00028.x.
- Alderman, Harold; Hoddinott, John; Kinsey, Bill (July 2006). "Long term consequences of early childhood malnutrition". Oxford Economic Papers. 58 (3): 450–474. doi:10.1093/oep/gpl008. hdl:10568/157407.
- Hoddinott, John; Maluccio, John; Behrman, Jere; Flores, Rafael; Martorell, Reynaldo (February 2008). "Effect of a nutrition intervention during early childhood on economic productivity in Guatemalan adults". The Lancet. 371 (9610): 411–416. doi:10.1016/S0140-6736(08)60205-6. PMID 18242415. S2CID 22647359.
