= Opportunity NYC =

Experimental conditional cash transfer program

Opportunity NYC was an experimental conditional cash transfer program (CCT) by the Mayor of New York City, Michael Bloomberg. Announced in April 2007, it was the first CCT program to be launched in the United States. Its initial phases were funded by a number of private partners including the Rockefeller Foundation, Robin Hood Foundation, the Open Society Institute, Starr Foundation, AIG, and Mayor Bloomberg's own Bloomberg Family Foundation. The program is being evaluated by MDRC, a nonprofit research firm, using a random assignment research design. Opportunity NYC was administered by Seedco, a nonprofit community development organization. The program ended on 31 August 2010.

== Background ==
The program hoped to build on the successes of similar programs that had garnered international recognition in the developing world, including the Bolsa Familia in Brazil and Oportunidades in Mexico. Oportunidades is a 10-year-old aid initiative that has been credited with alleviating Mexico's direst poverty and makes demands on participants while offering small but meaningful cash rewards.

The principal objective of Opportunity NYC Family Rewards was to test the impact of monetary incentives on children's education, family health and adults' workforce outcomes. The cash payments go to the family, almost always the mother or other female head of the household. Parents can receive from $40 to $100 a month if they keep up with responsibilities such as taking their children to the doctor or keeping them in school.

The program has three components: an education, health and work component. The education component gave money for certain milestones, including $50/month for 95% high school attendance, $600 for each Regent exam passed by a high school student, and $25 per parent-teacher conference the parents attended. The health component gave money for health related milestones, including $200 for each family member who received a non-emergency checkup from a doctor, and $200 upon completion of a pediatrician advised Early Intervention evaluation for a child under 30 months. The work component gives families $300 for someone working an average of 30 hours/week for 2 months, or between $300–$600 for completing an education or professional training course.

The World Bank, considers that "Conditional cash transfers provide money directly to poor families via a 'social contract' with the beneficiaries – for example, sending children to school regularly or bringing them to health centers. For extremely poor families, cash provides emergency assistance, while the conditionalities promote longer-term investments in human capital."

Those on the right applaud the system because it relies on individual initiative and acts as an investment in the future: Children in the program are healthier, they stay in school longer and they grow up with a better chance to become productive citizens. Those on the left say the program helps stabilize troubled families and gives poor children more consistent access to society's benefits.

== Results of Opportunity NYC ==
The program was constantly evaluated by MDRC, and data from the first two years of the program has been released, with the hope that research covering all 3 years of the program will be released in March 2011. The data shows that the program, in terms of overall poverty, created the greatest improvement in reducing the share of families living in severe poverty from 30% to 17%, and increased the likelihood that parents had bank accounts. In terms of education, positive results were most seen in high school and less in elementary and middle school students. The program group was shown to have an increased likelihood of passing at least two Regents exams by 6%, and increased the likelihood of having a 95% or better attendance by 15%. The effects of the program on improving heath was marginal, as the most significant statistic was an increase in the receipt of at least two preventative dental care visits by 10%. The program also had marginal effects in enhancing the parents' work and training, as it had a 2-3% greater likelihood of receiving a training certificate or associate degree.

== See also ==
- Bolsa Família
- Oportunidades
- Pantawid Pamilyang Pilipino Program
