= Social welfare in Mexico =

Mexico offers social welfare assistance designed to meet needs of the Mexican population, including assistance for low-income populations, women, youth, the elderly, and disabled individuals. Mexico has been offering social welfare since 1999. Despite the fact that Mexico offers welfare to its citizens through various programs, the poverty level in Mexico is currently at 36.3%.

== For low-income families ==
In Mexico, the social welfare program for low-income families was originally known as "Oportunidades", meaning "opportunities". It was eventually renamed "Prospera", meaning "to prosper". The program was established in 1997 and was designed to encourage families to send their children to school and health centres. Nearly six million families have benefited from this program. The goal of the “Prospera” program is to improve the quality of life of the poor in terms of nutrition, education, and health. The program is still available to date for Mexican citizens in need of assistance. In particular, it is highlighted on the Mexican government website for people who are affected by natural disasters and other emergencies.

Another program created to help low-income families was the FIDELIST. This program was created in 1984 and essentially subsidized the prices of corn tortillas. It ran until 1990 when it was replaced by the Tortilla sin Costo, which provided subsidized or free tortillas for 2.1 million low-income families and equaled approximately 3% of Mexico’s total corn consumption. However, the current tortillas program for low-income people in Mexico, as offered by the Mexican government, is to provide a two-year loan at 6% interest to set up a tortilla business; there are no 'free tortillas' for the poor.

== Socio-economic & Gender-based Disparities in Healthcare ==
Social welfare issues for women in Mexico often stem from disparities in accessing reproductive and general healthcare, resulting in women facing systematic violence. Women’s health care differs from general healthcare because of reproductive health factors inapplicable to male-born individuals. Therefore, gender-based variables along with barriers to universal healthcare make accessibility difficult particularly in the case of women (those who are female-born). These include ethnicity, economic status, and geographics. For instance, Indigenous women in Mexico face barriers to healthcare access (both general and reproductive) stemming from poverty, lack of education, and geographic isolation. Failing to adequately serve marginalized women sharing these characteristics reflects obstetric violence.

Along with lack of access as a form of discriminatory treatment, reproductive healthcare that is uneven in quality can lead to poor health outcomes for patients seeking maternal care. Thus, inconsistent or complete lack of reproductive healthcare constitutes obstetric violence. For example, while abortion is legal in many Mexican states, there is an immediate need for support through social welfare programs for those seeking backdoor abortions or victims of forced sterilization mandates through policy reform.

== Filling the Gaps: Social Welfare Programs for Minority Women ==
For women, several programs exist, like the “Programa para el Adelanto, Bienestar e Igualdad de las Mujeres (PROABUM)", enhancing women’s rights through financial aid and other forms of support, with a particular focus on reproductive health, leadership development, empowerment, and institutional strengthening.

Founded and supported by the Mexican federal government through INMUJERES, the program prioritizes low-income and marginalized women and offers prompt assistance to those in need of access to reproductive healthcare and support services. Through a network of Centros para el Desarrollo de las Mujeres (CDM) located in 11 towns in Mexico City, PROABIM provides services like healthcare access initiatives, economic empowerment programs, and legal consultation. These centers collaborate with local organizations to handle systemic issues, such as obstetric violence. Additionally, this program operates year-round and is evaluated on a regular basis through reports on its initiatives and results. This helps measure its impact and point out areas that need improvement. However, its accessibility for women from various socioeconomic backgrounds is still a crucial topic of evaluation.

As outlined in their “objectives” and “themes” section of their program overview, the “Coinversión para el Bienestar de las Mujeres” program acknowledges the importance of recognizing relationships between ethnic/racial qualities and gender in creating barriers to equal social and economic opportunities. Based on these connections, their services are structured, focusing on strengthening pre-existing organizations and promoting their call for equality in fields such as healthcare.

This program contributes to solving socio-economic and gender-based issues through financially advocating for organizations dedicated to confronting these challenges. Through funding, it prioritizes initiatives assisting young, adolescent, and elderly minority women. This also includes indigenous, LGBT+, and disabled women who are particularly susceptible to obstetric violence. For instance, it funds organizations focused on advancing public awareness of women’s reproductive rights and resources for approaching all forms of violence (including obstetric violence). On an institutional level, it supports organizations pushing for political reform that will ultimately make healthcare resources more easily accessible.

== Social welfare for children ==
Children in Mexico can also apply for social welfare, depending on their circumstances. One protection available to them is the DIF (Desarrollo Integral de la Familia), which is a program for family services that are state-run. Children can also benefit from the Prospera program (formerly known as Oportunidades) as mentioned above. According to a study by IFPRI, the International Food Policy Research Institute, Prospera has positively improved factors such as school enrollment, health appointment attendance, and children’s nutrition. For example, enrollment in school for Prospera children has increased significantly, with girls increasing by 20% and boys increasing by 10%. Some recent program advances have refocused assistance toward children in both rural and urban areas; originally, it was only set up to serve rural children. Now, more children have access to this assistance. Overall, the social welfare of children has been improved by these measures.

== For the elderly and disabled ==
Other groups that are eligible to receive social welfare assistance in Mexico are the elderly and the disabled. The pension age in Mexico is 65 years. The amount given in the pension varies depending on how much the person contributed to the pension program. Pensions are usually 2,253.76 pesos a month. People with disabilities are also given pensions. The average pension for a disabled individual is roughly 2,253.76 pesos a month.

== Prospera history ==
An evolution of the Oportunidades social welfare programme has, in its various forms, given conditional cash transfers (CCTs) to Mexico’s poorest since the 1990s. The scheme, originally called PRONASOL in 1989, before being renamed Progresa in 1997 and Oportunidades in 2002, was the first major social programme of its kind in Latin America. The programme gave poor families cash in exchange for their meeting conditions such as enrolling their children in school and getting regular health check-ups. It went on to inspire other similar schemes across Latin America, including Brazil’s Bolsa Família – perhaps the most well-known and successful of them all. The program was eliminated by the President Andrés Manuel López Obrador in 2019, and the funds allocated to a new program called "Becas para el Bienestar Benito Juárez" or Scholarships for Wellbeing Benito Juárez.

=== Becas para el Bienestar Benito Juárez ===
The program provides scholarships for families with children throughout early childhood and high school education. Requiring that the families have a child enrolled in a school.

This program targets families with school age children who live in extreme poverty, and previous beneficiaries of the PROSPERA program. The income of those participants must be below the Income Poverty Line (Pobreza por Ingresos LPI)
