= Hoddinott =

Hoddinott is a surname. Notable people with this surname include:

- Alun Hoddinott (1929–2008), Welsh classical composer
- Diana Hoddinott (born 1945), English actress
- Frank Hoddinott (1894–1980), Welsh association footballer
- John Hoddinott (economist) (born 1961), Canadian economist
- John Hoddinott (1944–2001), British police officer
- Robbie Hoddinott, member of Kingfish (band)
