= HarvestChoice =

HarvestChoice is a research initiative, which generates information to help guide strategic investments in agriculture aimed at improving the well-being of poor people in Sub-Saharan Africa through more productive and profitable farming. The initiative is coordinated by the International Food Policy Research Institute and the University of Minnesota and is supported by a grant to IFPRI by the Bill & Melinda Gates Foundation.

Phase I of HarvestChoice ran from October 2006 to June 2010, while Phase II began in December 2010 for a period of 4 years and a total budget of $8.2M.

== Purpose of the Initiative ==
HarvestChoice and its partners develop databases, tools, analyses, and syntheses designed to improve strategic investment and policy decisions related to farming. The overriding objective is to accelerate and enhance the performance of those crops and cropping systems most likely to bring significant benefits to the world's poor and undernourished.

== Types of Information provided ==
The use of spatially‐referenced data and spatially‐explicit analysis to generate spatially specific knowledge is a cornerstone of the HarvestChoice initiative. A fundamental characteristic of agriculture (particularly subsistence agriculture) is the close coupling of its performance with prevailing biophysical conditions, conditions that can vary widely over space and time. HarvestChoice relies on its own and its partners' spatial datasets to provide new information on:

- the location of the poor and undernourished in relation to major crop production systems
- the dependence of both urban and rural poor on specific crops and crop products
- the incidence and severity of major production constraints such as drought and disease in focus crops and locations
- the potential benefits to the poor from alleviating such constraints
- an inventory and characterization of existing and prospective technologies that might help address
- an economic evaluation of the potential crop production, consumption, price, and trade, as well as the likely hunger and income consequences of a range of technology scenarios, and
- the potential commercialization challenges that promising technology options might face.

=== Types of spatial data ===
There are five major, intertwined geographies of direct relevance to the work of HarvestChoice;

- the spatial distribution and performance of agricultural production systems,
- the spatial distribution and severity of production constraints (e.g., drought, low fertility soils, pests and diseases),
- spatial variation in the potential efficacy of on-farm interventions (e.g., improved seeds, mulching, supplemental irrigation, fertilizer use, biological control of pests),
- spatial variation in access to input and output markets (e.g. time of travel to markets, farmgate prices of fertilizer and agricultural products),
- spatial variation in national and local policies and regulations (that influence, for example, marketing decisions, the quality of infrastructure and services, the generation of and access to, and uptake of new technology).

== Spatial products ==
HarvestChoice makes available spatially (and socio-economically) explicit estimates of the potential welfare benefits of a range of interventions (e.g., on-farm, market and market access, and national policy).

These maps (alongside tables, graphs, and text) provide information of direct relevance to agricultural development investors and policymakers. They do this by detailing the potential scale and distribution of economic benefits – including the identification of locations and social groups whose welfare might be impacted negatively. These outputs will, however, be supplemented by a larger collection of novel spatial data products that represent key, intermediate factors;

- the baseline location and performance of agriculture worldwide (for at least 15 crops),
- the incidence and severity of production constraints (for at least 30 abiotic and biotic constraints),
- the potential response to on-site technology and management interventions (e.g., for different crop varieties, different levels of nutrient, water, and pest management), and
- the influence of changing transportation costs on profitability.

This amounts, potentially, to several thousand maps and associated datafiles.

== Literature ==
- Alston, Julian M., P.G. Pardey, J.S. James, and M.A. Andersen. 2009. The economics of agricultural R&D. Annual Review of Resource Economics 1: 537-565.
- Wood, S. 2007. A Harvest Choice Primer on Agricultural Potential
- Wood, S. 2007. A Harvest Choice Primer on Geographical Targeting/ Segmentation and Development Domains
- You, L., and S. Wood. 2006. An entropy approach to spatial disaggregation of agricultural production. Agricultural Systems 90(1-3): 329-347.
- You, L., S. Wood, and U. Wood-Sichra. 2009. Generating plausible crop distribution maps for Sub-Saharan Africa using a spatially disaggregated data fusion and optimization approach. Agricultural System 99, Issues 2-3, p. 126-140.
