= Pantawid Pamilyang Pilipino Program =

Conditional cash transfer program

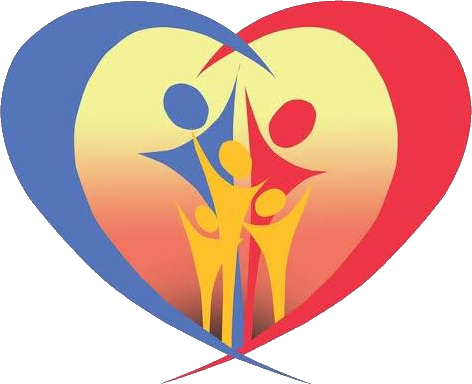
- Commercial?: No (Government)
- Type of project: Conditional cash transfer
- Owner: Department of Social Welfare and Development
- Country: Philippines
- Established: September 19, 2007
- Status: Active

Pantawid Pamilyang Pilipino Program (4Ps; lit. 'Bridging Program for the Filipino Family') is a conditional cash transfer program of the Philippine government administered by the Department of Social Welfare and Development (DSWD). It aims to reduce extreme poverty in the Philippines by investing in health and education, particularly for children aged 0–18. The program was modeled after similar conditional cash transfer programs in other developing countries, such as Brazil (Bolsa Família) and Mexico (Oportunidades). As of June 25, 2024, the program operates in 17 regions, 79 provinces, 1,484 municipalities, and 143 cities, covering 4,090,667 household beneficiaries.

Introduced by the DSWD as the Ahon Pamilyang Pilipino program through nationwide pilot tests in late 2007 during the administration of President Gloria Macapagal Arroyo, the 4Ps program was institutionalized through Republic Act No. 11310, which was signed into law by President Rodrigo Duterte in April 2019.

== Program structure ==
=== Objective ===
The program focused on these objectives:

1. Social development: by investing in capability-building, the program will be able to break the intergenerational poverty cycle.
2. Social assistance: provide cash assistance to address beneficiaries' short-term financial needs.

=== Eligibility ===
The poorest among poor families as identified by a 2003 Small Area Estimate (SAE) survey from the National Statistical Coordination Board (NSCB) are eligible. The poorest among the poor are selected through a proxy-means test. Economic indicators such as ownership of assets, type of housing, education of the household head, livelihood of the family and access to water and sanitation facilities are proxy variables to indicate the family economic category. Additional qualifications for households include having children 0–14 years old and/or pregnant women during the assessment. Applicants must agree on all the conditions set by the government to enter the program.

== History ==
The Department of Social Welfare and Development (DSWD), as headed by Secretary Esperanza Cabral, introduced a conditional cash transfer (CCT) program called the Ahon Pamilyang Pilipino for a pilot group of 4,459 families in the period of September to December 2007. The agency initiated the program after receiving inspiration for the idea at the World Bank's 3rd International Conference on Conditional Cash Transfer held in Istanbul, Turkey in June 2006, with Cabral introducing the concept to President Gloria Macapagal Arroyo at a March 2007 cabinet meeting that discussed poverty and the Millennium Development Goals set by the United Nations. The program was renamed Pantawid Pamilyang Pilipino in late 2008, and by 2009, the program's targeting system under DSWD for identifying impoverished households was instituted as the National Household Targeting System for Poverty Reduction (NHTS-PR), commonly known as "Listahanan" (lit. 'list-household', a portmanteau of the Filipino words "listahan" and "tahanan"). From 2007 to 2010, the program was mainly financed by loans from the World Bank.

== Analysis and reception ==
In a March 2012 report from the World Bank, the 4Ps program was found to have been most beneficial to the Philippines' most impoverished households among all socioeconomic classes, with 71% of its beneficiaries belonging to the poorest 20% of the national population. Based on these results, the report concluded that the program managed to reach a higher share of beneficiaries from the poorest households compared to other countries' CCT programs.

Certain entitites had derided the program (among other similar ones offered by the Government of the Philippines) as causing the recipients to lose incentive to strive hard and just wait for the payouts, that in the words of Ramon Tulfo, "it promotes sloth, indolence or laziness among the lower sectors of society."

== See also ==
Poverty in the Philippines: Hunger
