= Bienestar (Mexico) =

Bienestar (Spanish for welfare) is an umbrella term used by the federal government of Mexico since 2018, established during the presidency of Andrés Manuel López Obrador. The term Bienestar is widely used in the names of goods and services provided by various government secretariats and agencies throughout the country for social welfare.

== Agencies ==
- Alimentación para el Bienestar (Food for Welfare)
- Financiera para el Bienestar (Financial Services for Welfare)
- Instituto de Salud para el Bienestar (Institute of Health for Welfare; defunct)
  - IMSS-Bienestar, its successor
- Secretaría del Bienestar (Secretariat of Welfare)

== Goods ==
- Aceite del Bienestar (Welfare Oil)
- Agua Bienestar (Welfare Water)
- Arroz del Bienestar (Welfare Rice)
- Atún del Bienestar (Welfare Tuna)
- Avena del Bienestar (Welfare Oatmeal)
- Azúcar del Bienestar (Welfare Sugar)
- Café Bienestar (Welfare Coffee)
- Chocolate Bienestar (Welfare Chocolate)
- Frijoles Bienestar (Welfare Beans)
- Gas Bienestar (Welfare Gas)
- Harina para el Bienestar (Welfare Flour)
- Jabón en Barra del Bienestar (Welfare Soap)
- Jugos del Bienestar (Welfare Juice)
- Leche para el Bienestar (Welfare Milk)
- Lentejas del Bienestar (Welfare Lentils)
- Maíz del Bienestar (Welfare Maize)
- Miel del Bienestar (Welfare Honey)
- Papel higiénico del Bienestar (Welfare Toilet Paper)
- Pastas para sopa del Bienestar (Welfare Soup)
- Sardina del Bienestar (Welfare Sardine)

== Programs ==
- Fertilizantes para el Bienestar (Welfare Fertilizers)
- Pensión para el Bienestar (Welfare Pension)
- Universidades para el Bienestar Benito Juárez García (Welfare Universities Benito Juárez García)

== Services ==
- Banco del Bienestar (Welfare Bank)
- Cafetería del Bienestar (Welfare Coffeehouse)
- Conectividad para el Bienestar (Connectivity for Welfare)
- Farmacias del Bienestar (Welfare Pharmacies)
- Internet para el Bienestar (Internet for Welfare)
- Megafarmacia del Bienestar (Megapharmacy of Welfare)
- Tiendas del Bienestar (Welfare Stores)

== See also ==
- National Solidarity Program (Mexico), a welfare program that operated from 1989 to 1995
- Oportunidades, a welfare program that operated from 2002 to 2014
