= National Household Targeting System for Poverty Reduction =

Philippines poverty data system

- Talaan ng Sambahayan

Government Project overview
- Formed: 2009
- Headquarters: Batasan Complex, Constitution Hills, Quezon City
- Minister responsible: Vincent Andrew Leyson
- Government Project executives: Daric Antoni Dava, Systems Engineering; Vernon Tan, Systems Administration
- Parent Government Project: DSWD
- Website: nhto.dswd.gov.ph

The National Household Targeting System for Poverty Reduction (NHTS-PR), commonly known as Listahanan (lit. 'list-household', a portmanteau of the Filipino words "listahan" and "tahanan"), is a data bank and an information management system that identifies who and where the poor are in the Republic of the Philippines. Data collection began in response to findings by the National Statistical Coordination Board that 30% of Filipino families have an income below that needed for "basic requirements". It is intended to inform government departments and policy-makers on the socio-economic status of nearly 400,000 households.

== Outcomes ==
The use of the NHTSPR has led to 4.4 million poor households being enrolled in Pantawid Pamilyang Pilipino Program or the Philippine conditional cash transfer program, and the poor elderly receiving social pensions. It has also led to 4,000 health cards being distributed which provide state-run health insurance for poor families.

== Current operations ==
The database has identified a total of 5.25 million households below the poverty threshold of their respective provinces. With such information, national government agencies, local government unit, and non-government organizations can direct resources to the ones who need them the most. With the use of the database, projects like electrification can be concentrated on areas with high incidence of poverty, uplifting the community economic sustainability and reducing poverty. The system can also correlate other poverty related problems like human trafficking in order to prevent them from even happening.

== Driving mechanism ==
Since the NHTS-PR is technically an information management system, it is very reliant on technology. It uses Open Technologies as the primary software backbone and the latest multiple processor servers available at the time. A major challenge inherent to data sharing is porting since different agencies are using different proprietary software. To overcome such challenge, data porting software are developed in-house from existing Open Source systems.
