= Department of Social Welfare and Development =

Executive department of the Philippine government

- Kagawaran ng Kagalingan at Pagpapaunlad Panlipunan
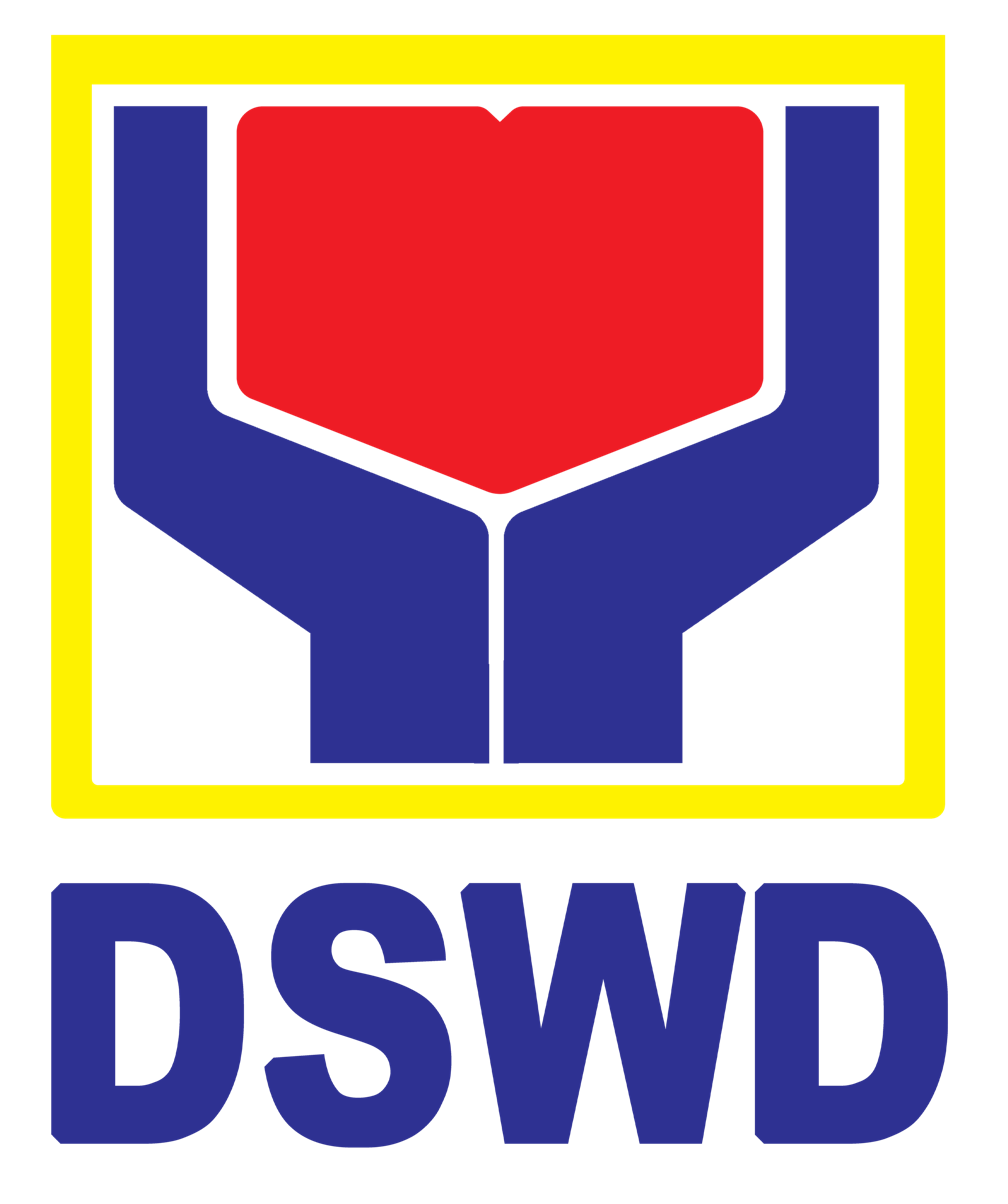
- Logo

Department overview
- Formed: May 31, 1939; 87 years ago
- Superseding Department: Social welfare and development
- Headquarters: Batasan Complex, Batasan Hills, Quezon City
- Motto: Maagap at Mapagkalingang Serbisyo (lit. Punctual and Compassionate Service)
- Employees: 3,018 (2024)
- Annual budget: ▼ ₱197 billion (2023)
- Department executives: Rex Gatchalian, Secretary; Hurjae Lubag, Head Executive Assistant, Office of the Secretary; Irene Dumlao, Spokesperson and Assistant Secretary for Disaster Response
- Website: www.dswd.gov.ph

The Department of Social Welfare and Development (DSWD; Filipino: Kagawaran ng Kagalingan at Pagpapaunlad Panlipunan) is the executive department of the Philippine government responsible for the protection of the social welfare of rights of Filipinos and to promote social development.

== History ==
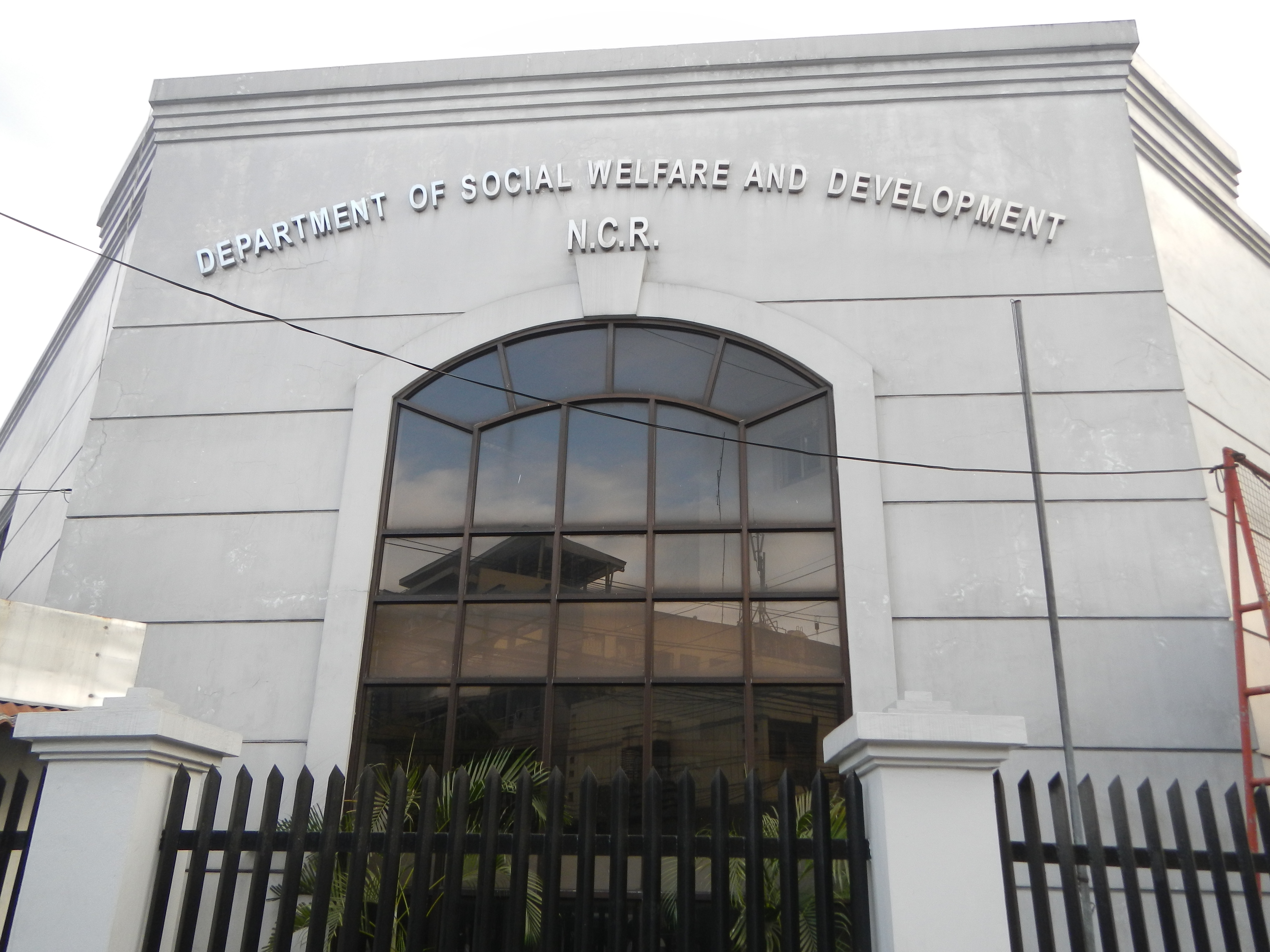
DSWD's Field Office building in the National Capital Region

=== American colonial era ===
In 1915, the Public Welfare Board (PWB) was created and tasked with studying, coordinating and regulating all government and private entities engaged in social services. In 1921, the PWB was abolished and replaced by the Bureau of Public Welfare under the Department of Public Instruction.

Commonwealth Act No. 430 enacted in May 31, 1939 created the Department of Health and Public Welfare. In 1941, the Bureau of Public Welfare officially became a part of the Department of Health and Public Welfare. In addition to coordinating services of all public and private social welfare institutions, the Bureau also managed all public child-caring institutions and the provision of child welfare services.

=== Post-World War ===
In 1947, President Manuel Roxas abolished the Bureau of Public Welfare and created the Social Welfare Commission, under the Office of the President, in its place.

=== As the Department of Social Welfare ===
In 1968, Republic Act 5416, known as the Social Welfare Act of 1968, created the Department of Social Welfare, placing it under the executive branch of government. In 1976, the Department of Social Welfare was renamed Department of Social Services and Development (DSSD) through Presidential Decree No. 994. This was signed into law by President Ferdinand Marcos and gave the department an accurate institutional identity. On June 2, 1978, the DSSD was renamed Ministry of Social Services and Development (MSSD) in line with the change in the form of government.

=== As the Department of Social Welfare and Development ===
The MSSD was reorganized and renamed the Department of Social Welfare and Development (DSWD) through Executive Order 123, which was signed by President Corazon Aquino. Executive Order No. 292 in 1987, also known as the Revised Administration Code.

In 1991, the passage of Republic Act No. 7160, otherwise known as the Local Government Code, affected the devolution of DSWD basic services to local government units.

== Organizational structure ==
The department is headed by the Secretary of Social Welfare and Development, with the following eleven undersecretaries and 20 assistant secretaries:

- Undersecretary for Social Welfare and Development
- Undersecretary for General Administration and Support Services Group
- Undersecretary for Operations Group
- Undersecretary for Disaster Response Management Group
- Undersecretary for Policy and Plans Group
- Undersecretary for Standards and Capacity Building
- Undersecretary for National Household Targeting System and Pantawid Pamilyang Pilipino Program
- Undersecretary for Special Concerns
- Undersecretary for Innovations
- Undersecretary for Inclusive and Sustainable Peace
- Undersecretary for Legislative Coordination and External Affairs
- Assistant Secretary for Strategic Communications
- Assistant Secretary for Policy and Plans
- Assistant Secretary for Legislative Affairs under PPG
- Assistant Secretary for External Assistance and Development under PPG
- Assistant Secretary for Administration under GASSG
- Assistant Secretary for Finance under GASSG
- Assistant Secretary for SCBG
- Assistant Secretary for DRMG
- Assistant Secretary for Specialized Programs under Operations Group
- Assistant Secretary for Statutory Programs under Operations Group
- Assistant Secretary for Regional Operations under Operations Group
- Assistant Secretary for the National Household Targeting System for Poverty Reduction
- Assistant Secretary for the Pantawid Pamilyang Pilipino Program
- Assistant Secretary for Inclusive-Sustainable Peace and Special Concerns
- Assistant Secretary for Community Engagement
- Assistant Secretary for Innovations
- Assistant Secretary for Partnerships Building and Resource Mobilization under the Office of the Secretary
- Assistant Secretary for International Affairs, and Attached and Supervised Agencies under the Office of the Secretary
- Assistant Secretary/Chief Information Officer under the Office of the Secretary
- Assistant Secretary/Special Assistant to the Secretary for Centers and Residential Care Facilities

== Attached agencies ==
- Council for the Welfare of Children
- National Authority for Child Care (NACC)
- Juvenile Justice and Welfare Council
- National Council on Disability Affairs

== Supervised agencies ==
- National Anti-Poverty Commission
- National Commission on Indigenous Peoples
- Presidential Commission for the Urban Poor

== Programs and Services ==
=== Kalahi CIDSS – NCDDP ===
The Kapit-Bisig Laban sa Kahirapan – Comprehensive and Integrated Delivery of Social Services – National Community-Driven Development Program (Kalahi CIDSS–NCDDP) is the community-driven development program of the Philippine Government implemented through the Department of Social Welfare and Development. Supplemented by the government of the Philippines.

=== The Pantawid pamilyang Pilipino Program ===
The Pantawid Pamilyang Pilipino Program or "4Ps" (conditional cash transfer) is a human development program that invests in the health and education of poor families, primarily those with children aged 0–18.

=== Sustainable Livelihood Program ===
The Sustainable Livelihood Program (SLP) is a community-based capacity building effort that seeks to improve the program participants’ socio-economic status through two tracks: Micro-enterprise Development and Employment Facilitation.

=== Listahanan ===
An information management system that identifies who and where the poor are in the country. It is being operated by the National Household Targeting System for Poverty Reduction (NHTS-PR).

=== Supplemental Feeding Program ===
Provision of food in addition to the regular meals, to target children as part of the DSWD's ECCD program of the government.

=== Disaster Response Operations ===
Life-saving emergency relief and long-term response.

=== RRPTP ===
Recovery and Reintegration Program for Trafficked Persons (RRTP) is a comprehensive package of programs and services, enhancing the psychosocial and economic needs of the beneficiaries.

=== PAMANA ===
Payapa at Masaganang Pamayanan (PAMANA) aims to improve access of poor communities to basic social services and promote responsive governance.

=== Protective Services Program ===
Assistance to Individuals In Crisis Situations (AICS) and Assistance to Communities in Needs (ACN) Provides a range of interventions to individuals, families, and communities in crisis or difficult situations and vulnerable or disaster-affected communities.

=== ISWSFN ===
International Social Welfare Services for Filipino Nationals is a program for migrant Filipinos and other overseas Filipino nationals who are in crisis situation and in need of special protection are encouraged to seek assistance in the Philippine Embassies in their countries of destination.

=== Center and Residential Care Facilities ===
Services rendered in facilities 24-hour that provide alternative family care arrangement to poor, vulnerable and disadvantaged individuals or families in crisis.

=== Adoption and Foster Care ===
The act of adoption, of permanently placing a minor with a parent or parents other than the birth parents in the Philippines.

=== Gender and Development ===
Gender is about relations—between men and women, women and women, also between men and men and boys and girls. The GAD as perspective recognizes that gender concerns cut across all areas of development and therefore gender must influence government when it plans, budget for, implements, monitors and evaluates policies, programs and projects for development.

=== BUB ===
Pilot tested in 2013 and now on its 3rd cycle, the Bottom-Up Budgeting (BUB) Process is proposed to ensure implementation of priority poverty reduction projects.
