= Universal allocation per child =

Social security program in Argentina

Universal Allocation Per Child (Spanish: Asignación universal por hijo) is a social security program in Argentina. It pays a monthly subsidy to families for each child under 18 or disabled. Despite the name, it is not yet a universal program, and currently applies only to families who do not have a regular reported income. A plan is in place to enlarge the scope of the program.

It was established in 2009 by a Necessity and Urgency Decree, signed by president Cristina Fernández de Kirchner. A conditional cash transfer programme, eligibility for the scheme was focused on families without formal employment and earning less than the minimum wage who ensured their children attended school, received vaccines and underwent health checks. By 2013 it covered over two million poor families, and by 2015 it covered 29 percent of all Argentinian children. A 2015 analysis by staff at Argentina's National Scientific and Technical Research Council estimated that the programme had increased school attendance for children between the ages of 15 and 17 by 3.9 percent.
