= Corruption in Sierra Leone =

Corruption in Sierra Leone is endemic. Sierra Leone is widely considered to be one of the most politically and economically corrupt nations in the world and international rankings reflect this. Transparency International's 2025 Corruption Perceptions Index scored Sierra Leone at 34 on a scale from 0 ("highly corrupt") to 100 ("very clean"). When ranked by score, Sierra Leone ranked 109th among the 182 countries in the Index, where the country ranked first is perceived to have the most honest public sector. For comparison with regional scores, the best score among sub-Saharan African countries (Note: Angola, Benin, Botswana, Burkina Faso, Burundi, Cameroon, Cape Verde, Central African Republic, Chad, Comoros, Côte d'Ivoire, Democratic Republic of the Congo, Djibouti, Equatorial Guinea, Eritrea, Eswatini, Ethiopia, Gabon, Gambia, Ghana, Guinea, Guinea-Bissau, Kenya, Lesotho, Liberia, Madagascar, Malawi, Mali, Mauritania, Mauritius, Mozambique, Namibia, Niger, Nigeria, Republic of the Congo, Rwanda, Sao Tome and Principe, Senegal, Seychelles, Sierra Leone, Somalia, South Africa, South Sudan, Sudan, Tanzania, Togo, Uganda, Zambia, and Zimbabwe.) was 68, the average was 32 and the worst was 9. For comparison with worldwide scores, the best score was 89 (ranked 1), the average was 42, and the worst was 9 (ranked 181, in a two-way tie). The 2018 Global Competitiveness Report ranked Sierra Leone 109th out of 140 countries for Incidence of Corruption, with country 140 having the highest incidence of corruption. Corruption is prevalent in many aspects of society in Sierra Leone, especially in the aftermath of the Sierra Leone Civil War. The illicit trade in conflict diamonds funded the rebel Revolutionary United Front (RUF) forces during the civil war, leading to fighting between the Sierra Leone Army and the RUF for control of the diamond mines. Widespread corruption in the health care sector has limited access to medical care, with health care workers often dependent on receiving bribes to supplement their low pay.

== History ==
Sierra Leone has struggled with corruption since its independence from the British in 1961. The All People's Congress (APC), which was in power from 1968 to 1992, was rife with corruption and engaged in numerous scandals, including misappropriation of funds and the creation of a patronage system to hold onto power. Under the leadership of President Siaka Stevens, powerful government officials, including the president, stole large amounts of wealth from state treasuries to enrich themselves and their allies. Corruption in the APC was well known due to the public nature of these scandals and their frequency. This widespread corruption contributed to ineffective governance and lack of trust in the state. In 2007, a leaked audit commissioned by then president Ernest Bai Koroma revealed widespread corruption in many government ministries including suspicious loans and missing international aid funds. The report identified corruption as a significant barrier to development in Sierra Leone and recommended thorough investigations.

== Corruption in health care ==
Like other countries in West Africa, access to health care can be difficult to obtain in Sierra Leone and often requires bribes. These bribes can supplement the low pay of medical staff or government workers, and are often given to avoid bureaucratic red tape. According to the Afrobarometer survey conducted in Sierra Leone in July 2018, 50% of respondents reported needing to pay a bribe in order to obtain medical care. This exacerbates a health care system that was already struggling to provide basic services. Corruption helped contribute to the spread and severity of the 2015 Ebola outbreak by weakening the under-resourced health care system. When the crisis struck, the health system was not able to withstand the pressure of a major outbreak. The health care system had been severely damaged by the Sierra Leone Civil War, leading to shortages of medical personnel, infrastructure and equipment. Corruption has contributed to failings in major health care initiatives including a policy that would provide free maternal health care to women in Sierra Leone. Scandals over coerced bribes and misappropriated funds harmed the effectiveness of the medical system. In the aftermath of these scandals, reforms were made to the program, including a tracking system for the allocation of medicine and accountability measures in the health care section. However, not all of these measures, including government efforts to raise health care worker's salaries, were seen as effective and bribery continues to be a major issue.

== Corruption in mineral extraction ==
Sierra Leone is well-endowed with diamonds, which are vulnerable to illicit extraction and smuggling. During the Sierra Leone Civil War, the rebel Revolutionary United Front (RUF) used revenue from the illicit diamond trade to fund their operations. The Mining regulations and laws currently in place are not adequately enforced, allowing illegal mining operations to successfully exploit natural resources including diamonds. In a 2011 study, interviewees reported the presence of corrupt officials responsible for monitoring diamond mining operations and preventing the smuggling of diamonds out of the country. These officials were alleged to take bribes in exchange for allowing illicit diamonds to be smuggled to neighbouring countries such as Guinea or Mali, where they are given false certificates stating that they came from legal mines.

== Sierra Leone Anti-corruption Commission ==
The Sierra Leone Anti-corruption Commission (ACC-SL) commonly known as ACC is an independent agency of the Sierra Leone government that investigates and prosecutes corruption cases. The ACC was established by the Anti-Corruption Act passed by the Sierra Leone Parliament in 2000 under the leadership of Sierra Leone's then president Ahmad Tejan Kabbah.
