= Near poverty =

State of living on income marginally above poverty

Near poverty is the state of living on an income marginally above the poverty line, defined by the U.S. Census Bureau as a household with an income "between 100 percent and 125 percent of the poverty line". The classification was first studied by the U.S. Census in a 2014 report that showed the number of people living just above the poverty line had decreased since the 1960s, believed to be due to an increase in the number of people who have fallen beneath the poverty line.

Children are particularly at risk of poverty and near-poverty. About thirty per cent of adults (18-64 years old) live in near-poverty, compared to 44 percent of children under 18 years of age.
