= Oportunidades =

Mexican social assistance program

Oportunidades (English: Opportunities; later rebranded as Prospera and more recently as Bienestar) is a government social assistance program in Mexico founded in 2002, based on a previous program called Solidaridad, created in 1988 and renamed Progresa in 1997. It is designed to target poverty by providing cash payments to families in exchange for regular school attendance, health clinic visits, and nutrition support. Oportunidades is credited with decreasing poverty and improving health and educational attainment in regions where it has been deployed. Key features of Oportunidades include:

- Conditional cash transfer (CCT): To encourage co-responsibility, receipt of aid is dependent on family compliance with program requirements, such as ensuring children attend school and family members receive preventative health care.
- "Rights holders": Program recipients are mothers, the caregiver directly responsible for children and family health decisions.
- Cash payments are made from the government directly to families to decrease overhead and corruption.
- A system of evaluation and statistical controls to ensure effectiveness.
- Rigorous selection of recipients based on geographic and socioeconomic factors.
- Program requirements target measures considered most likely to lift families out of poverty, focusing on health, nutrition and children's education.

Oportunidades championed the conditional cash transfer (CCT) model for programs instituted in other countries, such as a pilot program in New York City, the Opportunity NYC, and the Social Protection Network in Nicaragua. Other countries that have instituted similar conditional cash transfer programs include Brazil, Peru, Honduras, Jamaica, Chile, Malawi and Zambia.

== Administration ==
Progresa-Oportunidades is designed to be a centrally run program that relies on a horizontal integration of programs and services among the agencies and ministries in the executive branch. This required the establishment of a body with enough power to coordinate the participants in the program and monitor the budget. Instead of restructuring an old agency, it was decided to form a new agency with all of the appropriate powers and the backing from the president.

Although this provided for an easier and faster startup, it also meant that many of the related agency structures, which Progresa-Oportunidades would have to rely on for its sustainability, were incompatible with the new program. Officials in related structures such as the Ministry of Health and Education were not provided with the appropriate incentives to channel their work toward Progresa-Oportunidades. Many were individuals who had worked on earlier poverty programs and who now saw their resources shifting in a new direction. And officials often had more to gain politically from abandoning this program and starting a new one.

As a centrally administered program, Oportunidades allows for low operational costs and a greater level of efficiency in the transmission of benefits directly to the participants in the program. The program has sometimes been criticized for this completely “top down” approach. However, the lack of community participation in the identification of beneficiaries and the allocation of funding helps to limit the opportunities for corruption at the local level, which has traditionally been a problem with such government-funded programs.

== Information strategies ==
To effectively disseminate information about the program, Progresa-Oportunidades pursued a three-pronged strategy. First, an extensive amount of information was made generally available through the Internet. Secondly, information was provided to Congress and other government officials at all levels in the form of detailed budget proposals, program evaluations, and other relevant documents. Finally, public relations campaigns were initially minimal to avoid raised expectations. However, since 2006, the public profile of the program has been raised, particularly through extensive radio and television advertisements.

== Transparency and accountability ==
Traditionally, most anti-poverty programs in Mexico have relied on presidential support to establish their funding and public profile. Although Oportunidades originally was no different in its dependence on Zedillo to support its startup costs, much effort has since been made to establish an image of Progresa-Oportunidades as independent of the president and national party politics, in order to heighten the chances that it would survive transfers of power in the executive branch. Several congressional provisions have helped to ensure this identity.

Among these are several provisions that prevent the program being used for political proselytizing. In 2000 and 2003, program officials were prohibited from signing up new beneficiaries within six months of national elections to prevent vote buying. In addition, budget provisions have been enacted that attempt to directly communicate with beneficiaries to educate them about rights and responsibilities regarding the program.

== Under political transitions ==
The transition between the Zedillo and Fox administrations was a crucial test of the long-term sustainability of Progresa-Oportunidades. President Fox's administration achieved early public recognition for its commitment to anti-poverty strategies as well as its willingness to continue with earlier initiatives that had proved to be successful. Fox ultimately decided to continue with the program because its independent image meant that it had not become identified with the old ruling party (the PRI) or with former President Zedillo in the eyes of the public. Additionally, Fox had received confirmation of the program's benefits from the program's own impact evaluations and outside international financial institutions who held Oportunidades in high esteem and hoped to see it continue.

== Effectiveness ==
Oportunidades has been hailed as a success by many in Mexico and globally. The first round of evaluations were carried out by the prestigious International Food Policy Research Institute (IFPRI), between 1997 and 2000. The #IFPRI-Progresa partnership played a large role in shaping Mexican social policy and in bringing the randomized controlled trial (RCT) to the forefront of policy evaluation worldwide.

Since 2002, the Instituto Nacional de Salud Pública (National Public Health Institute, INSP) and the Centro de Investigaciones y Estudios Superiores en Antropología Social (Center for Research and Higher Studies in Social Anthropology, CIESAS) have been responsible for carrying out ongoing evaluations of both program operations and impact. The Oportunidades evaluation website contains a relatively comprehensive listing of the documents and databases produced during all of the evaluation rounds.

=== IFPRI-Progresa ===
Communications between IFPRI and Progresa's leadership commenced in late 1997, with the final contract ($2.5 million USD) signed during the third quarter of 1998. The IFPRI-Progresa research team's overall objective was to "determine if Progresa was functioning in practice as it [was] intended to by design." The evaluation was divided between 'operational' evaluation (is the program being carried out according to the design?) and 'impact' evaluation (is the program having the intended effect on the target population?). Without discounting the importance of the operational evaluation, the data focuses exclusively on impact evaluation, which received far greater attention and had a much broader audience. The impact evaluation involved the production of far more technical documents, reports, and later, published journal articles and books.

The results of IFPRI's initial evaluations began to form into reports in late 1999 and early 2000; most final reports (18 in total) were submitted before the end of 2000, with the executive synthesis report published on September 1 that year. The thematic core of the IFPRI evaluations conformed to the three program components: health, education, and nutrition. In these areas, Progresa increased school enrollment, lowered incidence of disease in children, and increased growth for young children receiving nutritional supplements. In sum "in the central impact areas...the results [were] encouraging."

==== Methodology ====
According to the bulk of literature describing IFPRI-Progresa, the project was the first large-scale social policy evaluation implemented in a ‘developing’ country context to use randomized controlled trial (RCT) research design. In the perennial debates surrounding the RCT as a tool of social policy evaluation IFPRI-Progresa provided (and continues to provide) an important proof-of-concept, an example exalted by proponents and held aloft before critics.

===== Sampling design =====
Original sample selection took place in mid-1997. All available information indicates that personnel at Secretaría de Desarrollo Social, Mexico undertook and directed the process before the arrival of most of the IFPRI research team.

One of the most detailed accounts is as follows:

"The design of the impact evaluation of Progresa in communities and households is quasi-experimental...To undertake this component of the evaluation, a random sample of communities with 'high' or 'very high' degrees of marginalization were selected which would be incorporated into the program during Phase II (November 1997) and which would serve as the [treatment] communities...Another sample of communities with similar characteristics was randomly designated from those that could have been the object of later selection, and that could function as controls...the size of the sample was estimated starting from a universe of 4,546 localities to choose 330 base localities, and from a universe of 1,850 to choose 191 control localities, using a distribution proportional to the size of the locality.”

===== Attrition =====
Attrition bias is a well-known issue in quantitative study designs which can create a situation "analytically similar" to selection bias in that "attrition lead[s] to selective [read: systematically different] samples." "The IFPRI evaluation did not follow up migrants as part of the evaluation surveys," and yet by November 2000, 17% of households and 29% of individuals from the original November 1997 sample were no longer in the survey. Moreover, "attrition differ[ed] significantly between treatment and control groups, even after controlling for household characteristics and the eligibility criteria." The presence of nonrandom attrition indicates that even if the samples were experimentally selected and statistically equivalent to begin with, by the end of the experiment period they would have been significantly unequal.

As opposed to selection bias, which features prominently in the IFPRI-Progresa documentation, only two final reports mention attrition bias (which creates essentially the same problem as selection bias from an analytic point of view). Schultz (2000) carried out analyses of enrollment using a "panel sample" (households with data across all five survey rounds) and "pooled sample" (households with data in at least one survey round). While admitting that "it is not possible to implement a satisfactory sample-selection-correction model," the word 'attrition' appears only once. The rest of the report frames the use of both samples as a form of robustness testing. This framing turns attention away from attrition bias, instead highlighting the dual-sample testing as a strength of the analysis. Behrman and Todd (1999) discuss attrition more extensively.

===== Contamination =====
Here, contamination refers to the possibility that "families or individuals from control localities or other localities [can] immigrate to treatment group localities in order to receive program services" (the term can refer to several other concepts). As with attrition bias, the decision to not track down sample out-migrants makes any quantification of this bias impossible. For later survey rounds, however, the outlook is worrisome:

"The rapid expansion of the program, even before households in the original control communities started receiving transfers, meant that control communities often literally were surrounded by other communities that were already receiving them. Under such circumstances, it is likely that households in the control communities may have expected to receive [Progresa] transfers before they actually started to receive them, which complicates interpretation of the estimated program effects."

===== Changing eligibility requirements =====
The targeting mechanisms Progresa employed were the subject of much discussion and varied across time. To summarize, Progresa targeted beneficiaries using a three-tiered mechanism: (1) the selection of marginal communities according to specially developed marginality index, (2) the selection of poor households using a multidimensional poverty line, and (3) community validation of the list of beneficiaries at a town meeting.

The weighting of different household characteristics in the calculations of household (not community) eligibility was modified during mid-1999, between the IFPRI-Progresa surveys, a process dubbed densificación or densification (in response to "the tendency of the [targeting] method to classify as beneficiaries households with more children and to exclude smaller households or older households that have no young children,"). These adjustments shifted the definition of 'poor'/eligible households and increased the number of eligible households in the sample from 53% to 78% in the treatment group, and from 50% to 78% in the control group.

As of November 1999, when the final round of ENCEL surveys was conducted, "819 of the 3023 densified households [27% of those added through densification, 3% of the overall sample] had been incorporated."

Three of the final evaluation studies define 'eligible' households as only the group originally chosen for incorporation (pre-densification). Ten others employ the post-densification criteria, and finally two more experiment with both.

== Critical academic reviews of effectiveness ==
Beltran and Delgado (2023) use a Computable general equilibrium (CGE) model to investigate the impact on poverty and income distribution of the Prospera program. Their conclusions, which are more negative than many other reposts, include the following: while the transfers to households from the poor category have a positive impact on the Mexican economy they serve to hide the real problem. The real problem for Beltran and Delgado is the low wage share; while the program has tended to prevent poverty from deepening it has neither reduced the numbers in poverty or reduced inequality; that variations in consumption are better explained by the variations in the returns to capital and rather than to labor.

== Influence ==
IFPRI-Progresa catalyzed a number of changes in Mexican governance and global international development agendas.

By the time Progresa began to form in the heads of Mexican social policy designers, the controversy surrounding the long rule of the Partido Revolucionario Institucional (Institutional Revolutionary Party, PRI) and its social policies was already entrenched. Under 'New Federalism,' president Ernesto Zedillo (1994–2000) was attempting to de-politicize social programs. One of the paramount objectives at the core of Progresa’s development, therefore, was to establish the program's apolitical status by sustaining it through the presidential switch in 2000. Vicente Fox Quesada, leader of the Partido Acción Nacional (National Action Party, PAN), won the presidential elections on July 2, 2000 and took office on December 1.

Surviving the presidential election cycle — a feat never before accomplished by a Mexican social program — Progresa endured through the first changeover of the national ruling party in 71 years. The IFPRI final reports were released primarily during this interval. Program supporters used the transition period to convince skeptical parties in the new administration of Progresa' effectiveness through personal contact, meetings, and media reports.

Due to the IFPRI evaluations, Progresa gained political hardiness and funding sources, while evaluation became a codified part of Mexican social programming. Fox continued the program and expanded it significantly into urban areas. A loan for US$1 billion from the Inter-American Development Bank (IDB) for the expansion of the program was negotiated during 2001, and disbursed beginning in 2002. In 2003, the Ley General de Desarollo Social (General Law of Social Development, LGDS) explicitly codified the requirement for independent evaluation for all federally run Mexican social programs and for this purpose established the Consejo Nacional de Evaluación (National Council on Evaluation, CONEVAL).

The excitement for the new program spread not only through Mexico, but through the IDB and World Bank, too. Both organizations extensively employed the example of IFPRI-Progresa to forward CCTs and EBP (via rigorous evaluation of social programs). The World Bank featured the program as a model in the 2004 Conference on Poverty in Shanghai, and in 2006 the former President James D. Wolfensohn commented "Progresa’s rigorous emphasis on evaluation has set a standard for poverty reduction programs in the developing world." The evaluation remains one of the programs' most celebrated features, having "inspired many others in Latin America and other regions."

CCTs worldwide have drawn from the Oportunidades' model, often through direct consultation with its designers and managers. Subsequent evaluations of Oportunidades and other CCT programs have corroborated the positive effects found in the results found by IFPRI-Progresa.

== See also ==
- Bolsa Família
