= Sustainable livelihood =

Development concept

Sustainable livelihood emerges at the intersection of development and environmental studies to offer a new way to think about work, production and distribution. Specifically, the work of vulnerable populations (e.g., low income population living in the bottom of the pyramid, indigenous communities, etc.) are discussed in this concept to build a sustainable future where inequality is eliminated in households. The term reflects a concern with extending the focus of poverty studies beyond the physical manifestations of poverty to include also vulnerability and social exclusion.

The term sustainable refers to an individual's ability to provide for themselves in a viably long manner. "Sustainability" also refers to the ability to undergo external shocks or stresses and recover from such traumas by maintaining or improving one's livelihood. The sustainable livelihood framework provides a structure for holistic poverty alleviation action. The sustainable livelihood approach focuses on finding resolutions to the problems of vulnerable communities by creating human-centered, participatory, and dynamic development opportunities. It is a bridge connecting the environment and humans to live in harmony. One example of an activity that aims for enhancing sustainable livelihood is the Sustainable Development Goals (SDGs) proposed by the United Nations. All of their 17 goals for 2030 are the aimings that the world needs to be achieved to ensure that "no one is left behind" and a sustainable world. However, due to the COVID-19 pandemic, all 17 goals are experiencing significant delay and need to be tackled in a collaborative way beyond the flame of the goals. For example, SDG 1(No Poverty) was pushed back due to job losses and declining household welfare decreasing financial security and halted development in fighting poverty.

== History ==
The term Sustainable Livelihood was first proposed in a rural context, and was later amended by the Brundtland Commission. Authors Gibson-Graham, Cameron, and Healy highlight the measure of well-being and how an individual's well-being contributes to their ability to survive well.

=== Brundtland commission ===
The sustainable livelihoods idea was first introduced by the Brundtland Commission on Environment and Development, and the 1992 United Nations' Conference on Environment and Development expanded the concept, advocating for the achievement of sustainable livelihoods as a broad goal for poverty eradication.

In 1992 Robert Chambers and Gordon Conway proposed the following composite definition of a sustainable rural livelihood, which is applied most commonly at the household level: "A livelihood comprises the capabilities, assets (stores, resources, claims and access) and activities required for a means of living: a livelihood is sustainable which can cope with and recover from stress and shocks, maintain or enhance its capabilities and assets, and provide sustainable livelihood opportunities for the next generation; and which contributes net benefits to other livelihoods at the local and global levels and in the short and long term."

== Development of concept ==
Stemming from theory regarding sustainable development, a sustainable livelihood approach incorporates the collective concerns for environmental and economic resources and individual focus.

=== Individual well-being ===
In an analysis of various 24 hour clocks, Gibson-Graham et al. synthesize five categories for overall well-being: Material, Occupational, Social, Community, and Physical. Holistic interventions prove to be challenging to measure, furthermore, quantitative data on qualitative phenomena (such as well-being) is similarly challenging to record.

== Models for a sustainable livelihood approach ==
There are several organizations incorporating a Sustainable Livelihood approach into their ongoing poverty alleviation efforts; the models by which they adapt the Sustainable Livelihood approach are discussed below.

=== SDGs ===
The Sustainable Development Goals (SDGs) are the goals for creating a sustainable world aiming for 2030 by tackling various issues, including poverty. In 2015, this action was adopted by the United Nations and started. For every 17 goals, there are specific goals under the primary goal, and they are approached comprehensively on national, community, and individual scales. The United Nations issues a progress report annually indicating the progress of each SDG.

=== SCDF ===
The acronym stands for The Smart Community Development Framework and aims to find the problems of vulnerable communities in order to propose resolutions to establish sustainable livelihoods. The primary purpose is to identify each community's needs and determine a society-specific solution to eliminate the vulnerability of that community, especially poverty. The framework focuses on empowering communities to make their own decisions about the problems by creating an environment where issues would be solved permanently since the people in that environment actively participate in overcoming the challenges.

=== UNDP ===
The United Nations Development Programme utilizes a sustainable livelihood approach to development through the evaluation of different types of capital. The UNDP identifies five key types of capital: human, social, natural, physical, and financial. The access individuals have to these assets determines how the UNDP designs initiatives to directly or indirectly facilitate development. The UNDP also uses an asset based approach to poverty alleviation, examining how individuals leverage assets and cope with external sources of shock or stress.

=== CARE ===
CARE (Cooperative for Assistance and Relief Everywhere) focuses on emergency relief administration and long-term development programs. In 1994, CARE developed a Household Livelihood Security framework to better monitor, evaluate, and track the work they conduct. CARE's application of a sustainable livelihood framework moves away from a sectorial approach and focuses on holistic development techniques.

=== DFID ===
The Department for International Development is the United Kingdom's department dedicated to eradicating extreme poverty and administering foreign aid. The DFID leverages a sustainable livelihoods framework to focus holistically on activities directly related to improving an individual's livelihood. Human-centered, multi-leveled, sustainable, and dynamic initiatives are all incorporated into the DFID's measures.

== See also ==
- Brundtland Commission
- Sustainable Development Goals
- Department for International Development
- United Nations Development Programme
- CARE (relief agency)
