= Productive Safety Net Programme =

The Productive Safety Net Programme (PSNP) is a social protection program by the Government of Ethiopia targeting food-insecure households.

== Operations ==
Established in 2005, the objective of the program is to prevent household asset depletion and create community assets. To this end, the program provides cash or food payments against public works that build local infrastructure (e.g. roads) or protect environment (e.g. terracing). Poor and vulnerable households with limited labour capacity receive unconditional (direct support) payments. Moreover, eligible households with pregnant or lactating women or infant children are receive temporary direct support. PSNP operates in chronically food insecure districts (woredas) in six Ethiopian regions: Afar, Amhara, Oromia, Somali, Southern Nations, Nationalities, and Peoples' Region, and Tigray.

== Notability ==
PSNP is the second largest social safety net program in Africa (after South Africa). In 2015, more than seven million people benefited from the program. PSNP is implemented by the Government of Ethiopia and has been supported by several international donors, including the Danish International Development Agency, Ireland's Department of Foreign Affairs, Global Affairs Canada, European Commission, Irish Aid, Royal Netherlands Embassy, Swedish International Development Cooperation Agency, UK Department for International Development, United Nations Children’s Fund, United States Agency for International Development, World Bank and the World Food Programme.

Evaluations by the International Food Policy Research Institute (IFPRI) show that PSNP is well-targeted towards the most food insecure and poorest households residing in the areas in which the program operates. Moreover, IFPRI-led impact evaluations show that PSNP has improved household food security and expenditures.
