= Social Protection Network =

Nicaraguan social assistance program

The Social Protection Network (Red de Protección Social in Spanish or RPS) is a Nicaraguan Conditional Cash Transfer program. It is designed to address both current and future poverty via cash transfers targeted to households living in poverty in rural Nicaragua. It began in 2000.
