= National Solidarity Program (Mexico) =

The National Solidarity Program (Spanish: Programa Nacional de Solidaridad, PRONASOL) was a social development program in Mexico enacted between 1989 and 1994 by President Carlos Salinas de Gortari. The program was marked by increased government social spending targeting Mexico's extremely impoverished. This spending was channeled through the greater PRONASOL government organization, which contained smaller organizations based around improving specific aspects of Mexican life through targeted subsidies guided by grassroots organizing. The PRONASOL program is pointed to by scholars as instrumental in the electoral success of Salinas de Gortari's Institutional Revolutionary Party in 1991 and its political dominance over the left in the early 1990s. The program ended in 1995 after the end of Salinas de Gortari's presidential term, with President Ernesto Zedillo shifting and rebranding PRONASOL into the Alliance for Well-Being.

== Background ==
PRONASOL was the product of a neoliberal turn in Mexican economic policy originating in 1982 with the presidency of Miguel de la Madrid. In 1982, Mexico faced extreme public debt which its government was unable to make payments on as well as a lack of funding for its development plans. This was due to the falling price of oil in the 1980s, as the Mexican government relied on oil money to fund these expenses. Following this crisis, De La Madrid's government attempted to restructure the Mexican economy based on neoliberal principles. Carlos Salinas de Gortari entered the presidency in 1988 in the context of falling wages and increasing unemployment and poverty contemporaneous with the De La Madrid government's policy of austerity. De La Madrid and Salinas de Gortari's Institutional Revolutionary Party faced falling popularity due to these issues, with Salinas de Gortari creating the PRONASOL program in attempt to regain support. In this, the program was "simultaneously a project for political change, a social shock-absorber, and an ideological banner."

== Structure ==
The PRONASOL program was characterized by strong decentralization, with some 100,000 - 250,000 local committees dedicated to its implementation and guidance by grassroots communities. Under this guidance, many new programs fell under the umbrella of PRONASOL, dictated by these committees in collaboration with the government to address local needs. Due to this decentralization, PRONASOL contained many different organizations within itself, such as Solidarity for Social Well-Being, with goals of increasing social services, and Solidarity for Production, a loan provider. Through Solidarity for Regional Development, the program also included initiatives for infrastructure improvement, such as urban improvements to water, sanitation, and roads. Rural investment was covered through Solidaridad Production Funds, which primarily provided loans to peasants. PRONASOL also included the Municipal Solidaridad Funds, which provided state governments with block grants, characterized by scholars as "among the more effective Solidaridad programs."

== Effects ==
While PRONASOL's investment did result in many improvements, the unequal distribution of these improvements limited its effectiveness. In six years, PRONASOL funded thousands of schools, hundreds of hospitals, built hundreds of thousands of new homes, and renovated even more. However, scholars contend that its allocation was geographically focused on areas of high electoral competition, with far more funding going to middle-income states over the poorest parts of the country. One of the least-invested states was Chiapas, where the Zapatista uprising occurred in 1994. The program overall had an effect of increasing political support for Salinas de Gortari in some areas, however this unequal distribution limited its ability to deliver lasting change.

== See also ==
- Bienestar (Mexico), a similar program established in 2018
- Secretariat of Welfare
- Valle de Chalco Solidaridad, a municipality named after the program
