= Seedco =

- Formation: 1987
- Type: non-profit
- Location: New York, NY
- Executive Director: Keith Rasmussen
- Website: www.seedco.org

Seedco, the Structured Employment Economic Development Corporation, was founded in 1987 and is a national nonprofit organization dedicated to advancing economic opportunity for people, businesses, and communities in need. Seedco's headquarters are located in New York City and the organization does work in Arkansas, Connecticut, Georgia, Maryland, New York, Tennessee, and Washington, D.C. Seedco formerly invested in low-income communities in many areas of the country to create jobs and support small business owners through its subsidiary, Seedco Financial. Seedco Financial was spun off into its own company in 2012 now under the name TruFund Financial Services.

Seedco operates as both a direct services provider and an intermediary organization, helping community-based organizations expand outreach and secure funding, and is an affiliate of the Acacia Network.

Seedco’s major initiatives include:

- Workforce development—Using a long-term career case management model, Seedco helps individuals with barriers to employment obtain, retain and advance in jobs.
- Work and family supports—Seedco helps low-income families successfully enroll in benefits and assistance programs and move towards self-sufficiency. Seedco’s proprietary EarnBenefits Online (EBO) software is central to this work.

== History ==
Seedco was founded in 1987 as a community development intermediary with funding from the Ford Foundation to help urban institutions such as universities and hospitals revive their inner cities. The core populations served by Seedco are:

- Young adults
- Parents and families
- Individuals with criminal justice involvement
- Uninsured individuals
- Jobseekers

== City & Federal Investigation of Fraud ==
In August 2011 The New York Times published an article in which a whistle-blower came forward with evidence of fraudulent job placements being submitted at the Seedco operated Workforce1 Career Center in Upper Manhattan. The center was operated under contract with the New York City Department of Small Business Services and supported with federal Workforce Investment Act (WIA) funds. An investigation by the New York City Department of Investigation found that Seedco had falsely claimed to have helped at least 1,400 people with finding jobs. The report stated that Seedco “developed systematic practices to report false placements” to the city’s Department of Small Business Services. As a result, the New York City Department of Small Business Services transferred Seedco's $7 million annual contract to several other nonprofit organizations. The US Attorney's Office also launched an investigation into Seedco (and seven former managers) and filed a multimillion-dollar lawsuit claiming:

"SEEDCO and the Individual Defendants engaged in this fraudulent scheme to maintain SEEDCO’s contract in connection with its Upper Manhattan Workforce1 Career Center, and to acquire its contract to operate a WorkForce1 Career Center in the Bronx, as well as to increase its compensation in connection with both centers. SEEDCO caused false and inflated placement figures to be reported through New York City and New York State to the United States Department of Labor to receive federal subsidies for its job program. Moreover, through their participation in the fraud, the Individual Defendants maintained or acquired managerial positions. Each of the Individual Defendants who did not already hold the position of Center Director at the beginning of their work with SEEDCO achieved a promotion during the period in which he or she participated in the fraud."

In December 2012 Seedco agreed to pay $1.725 million as a settlement of the civil fraud lawsuit brought by the US Attorney's Office.
