= International Food Policy Research Institute =

Organization

International Food Policy Research Institute (IFPRI)
- Founded: 1975
- Type: Non-profit
- Purpose: Poverty reduction, Nutrition and Diets, Food security and Hunger, Agriculture, Food systems, Climate change, Sustainability, Natural Resources, Sustainable livelihood, Gender equality, Policy analysis and solutions
- Location: Washington, DC, USA
- Region served: Global
- Method: Social science research
- Key people: Johan (Jo) Swinnen, Director General; Pascal Lamy, Board of Trustees
- Revenue: US$109,877,000 in 2023
- Employees: 599
- Website: www.ifpri.org

The International Food Policy Research Institute (IFPRI) is an international research center focused on agriculture and food systems that provides research-based policy solutions to reduce poverty and end hunger and malnutrition throughout low- and middle-income countries in environmentally sustainable ways. For nearly 50 years, IFPRI has worked with policymakers, academics, non-governmental organizations, the private sector, development practitioners, and others to carry out research, capacity strengthening, and policy communications on food systems, economic development, and poverty reduction.

IFPRI is a Research Center of CGIAR, the world's largest international agricultural research network, and the only CGIAR center solely dedicated to food policy research. IFPRI's research is supported by more than 185 donors, and through a multi donor trust fund for the CGIAR, which is funded by national governments, multilateral funding and development agencies, and private foundations.

IFPRI's researchers work on a range of disciplines and topics, including agricultural economics, political economy, rural poverty and transformation, social protection, women's empowerment, food environments, digital innovations and practices, and policy analysis and modeling. The Institute collaborates with hundreds of local, regional, and national partners along the research and policy life cycle.

IFPRI's regional programs for Africa, Latin America and the Caribbean, and South Asia, as well as its country-level programs, respond to national demands for food policy research, strengthen local capacities for research and policy analysis, and support country-led development. The Institute has around 600 employees from around the world working in over 80 countries, with more than half of its researchers based in low- and middle-income countries. In Africa, IFPRI maintains a regional office in Senegal and country programs in Egypt, Ethiopia, Ghana, Kenya, Malawi, Nigeria, Rwanda, and Sudan. IFRI's South Asia office is based in India, with country offices in Bangladesh, China, and Myanmar. The Institute also operates a country office in Papua New Guinea.

IFPRI is recognized as a leader in global development research worldwide. The Institute is ranked highly among all agricultural economics departments worldwide, in the field of African economics, and in development economics, and is listed in the top 1% of all institutions registered in Research Papers in Economics (RePEc). Independent, peer-reviewed assessments of IFPRI's impact show that the Institute's research work has benefited 270 million people worldwide, and just a few of its efforts—including work on Mexico's Progresa social protection program, the liberalization of rice markets in Viet Nam, and Ethiopia's Productive Safety Net Program, among others—have been estimated to lead to more than US$1 billion in economic returns and environmental benefits. The Institute's researchers and their activities have been recognized by several prestigious organizations, including the Agricultural & Applied Economics Association and the International Association of Agricultural Economists.

The Institute publishes and shares its research and analysis through a range of publications, including peer-reviewed articles, books, briefs, and reports, blogs, and interactives, and different events, including conferences and seminars, among other activities. IFPRI regularly contributes to major international meetings and events, such as the 28th UN Climate Change Conference of the Parties (COP28) in 2023 in Dubai, where its researchers organized and participated in multiple events focusing on the nexus between climate change and food security and nutrition, social equity, gender equality, and resilience, among other topics.

== Scope ==
IFPRI's research and engagement centers on a holistic three-pronged approach to contribute to reducing poverty and ensuring that all people have access to sustainable diets: (1) clarify the situation and outlook of a particular situation or challenge, (2) test and scale potential technological and policy solutions, and (3) help build an enabling environment to facilitate change.

IFPRI collaborates with more than 300 partner organizations to increase the impact of the Institute's research and build connections across topical areas and the policy community for sustainable, resilient, and equitable agriculture and food systems. These partners include a wide range of local and national partners in low- and middle-income countries, as well as research, scaling, advocacy, and funding partners, who help provide rigorous, policy-relevant evidence and recommendations to policymakers, donors, the private sector, and civil society. As part of CGIAR, IFPRI also maintains strong engagement with colleagues from other CGIAR Centers.

== Research Areas ==
IFPRI conducts cross-cutting research on a wide range of topics, including nutrition, food prices, gender, climate change, natural resource management, agricultural innovation, social protection, and agricultural extension. The Institute's efforts focus on research and innovation to deliver integrated policies, investments, governance processes, and capacity building that support equitable and sustainable food systems transformation, as well as improved livelihoods and healthy diets. IFPRI adapts its research and capacity strengthening work to address diverse challenges and opportunities in different countries around the world.

As a Research Center of CGIAR, IFPRI's research activities align with CGIAR's five impact areas: nutrition, health, and food security; poverty reduction, livelihoods, and jobs; environmental health and biodiversity; gender equality, youth, and social inclusion; and climate adaptation and mitigation.

== Products and publications ==
IFPRI's policy and research products are targeted to multiple audiences, including policymakers, nongovernmental organizations (NGOs), civil society organizations, donors, advisors, and the media. IFPRI publications are open access.

IFPRI's publications and outputs include books, reports, newsletters, briefs, fact sheets, blogs, and photo essays. The Institute is also involved in the collection of primary data and the compilation and processing of secondary data. IFPRI researchers publish extensively in top journals in the fields of agricultural economics, development, food policy, nutrition, and more.

The Global Food Policy Report is IFPRI's flagship publication. To meet the needs of policymakers and researchers focused on food security and nutrition, this annual report presents an overview of a salient topic in the field and discusses relevant challenges and solutions in major world regions.

In recent years, the Global Food Policy Report has focused on pressing issues facing the world's food systems, including the role of sustainable healthy diets in human and planetary well-being, approaches to building resilience to food crises, food system actions to increase adaptation and resilience to climate change, and the need for food systems transformation in the aftermath of the COVID-19 pandemic.

== Director's General ==
- Johan (Jo) Swinnen (2020–Present)
- Shenggen Fan (2009–2020)
- Joachim von Braun (2002–2009)
- Per Pinstrup-Andersen (1992–2002)
- Just Faaland (interim DG, 1990–1992)
- John Williams Mellor (1977–1990)
- Dale E. Hathaway (1975–1977, founding director general)

== Impact ==
Evaluating the impact of policy-oriented research is a complex undertaking, considering difficulties in quantifying the impact of knowledge and ideas on reduced poverty and/or increased income or the attribution of a change in these numbers to a specific study or research project.

Despite the challenges of evaluating research impact, IFPRI has commissioned 46 independent, peer-reviewed assessments of its work. The Institute also works with researchers to validate its efforts and shares these findings through peer-reviewed briefs, brochures, blogs, events, and other outputs. IFPRI publishes a blog series called Making a Difference, which showcases impact stories that represent a range of research, communications, and capacity-strengthening work.

Conservative estimates of IFPRI's impact show that just a few of the Institute's activities—in Bangladesh, Ethiopia, India, Kenya, Mexico, Tanzania, and Viet Nam—have led to economic and environmental benefits exceeding US$1 billion. IFPRI's research has also been shown to have indirectly benefited more than 270 million people around the world. In Brazil, IFPRI's evaluation of the country's conditional cash transfer program led to changes in the targeting approach of its successor program, Bolsa Família, which has 52 million beneficiaries. In Viet Nam, the Institute's policy advice on rice market reforms helped create better incomes and food security for 24 million people engaged in rice farming. IFPRI's research on the economic benefits of road building in India helped 18 million people escape poverty through the Prime Minister's Rural Roads Program.

== Criticism ==
Evaluations from the early 2000s and late 1990s praise the Institute's quality and quantity of work, but critique its priorities in selecting research topics and its efforts to undertake capacity-strengthening and other outreach activities. Critics have also questioned whether IFPRI focused too much on conducting world supply-demand projections and following technical pursuits to the detriment of doing analyses of applied policies, political economy, and the impacts of agricultural subsidies and incentives for investment in agricultural research and development.

IFPRI and CGIAR have also been criticized for receiving funding from the Bill & Melinda Gates Foundation, with critics fearing that the Foundation's influence will lead to the promotion of an agribusiness agenda that ignores broader social and economic factors.

Critics argue that several efforts to improve collaboration, effectiveness, and efficiency among the CGIAR Research Centers have been too slow or inadequate, and some critiques have pointed to a perceived lack of clear research priorities, buy-in from the Global South, and diversity in leadership, as well as an overly bureaucratic, "business-as-usual" approach to restructuring.
