= Climate change and sexual and reproductive health and rights in Africa =

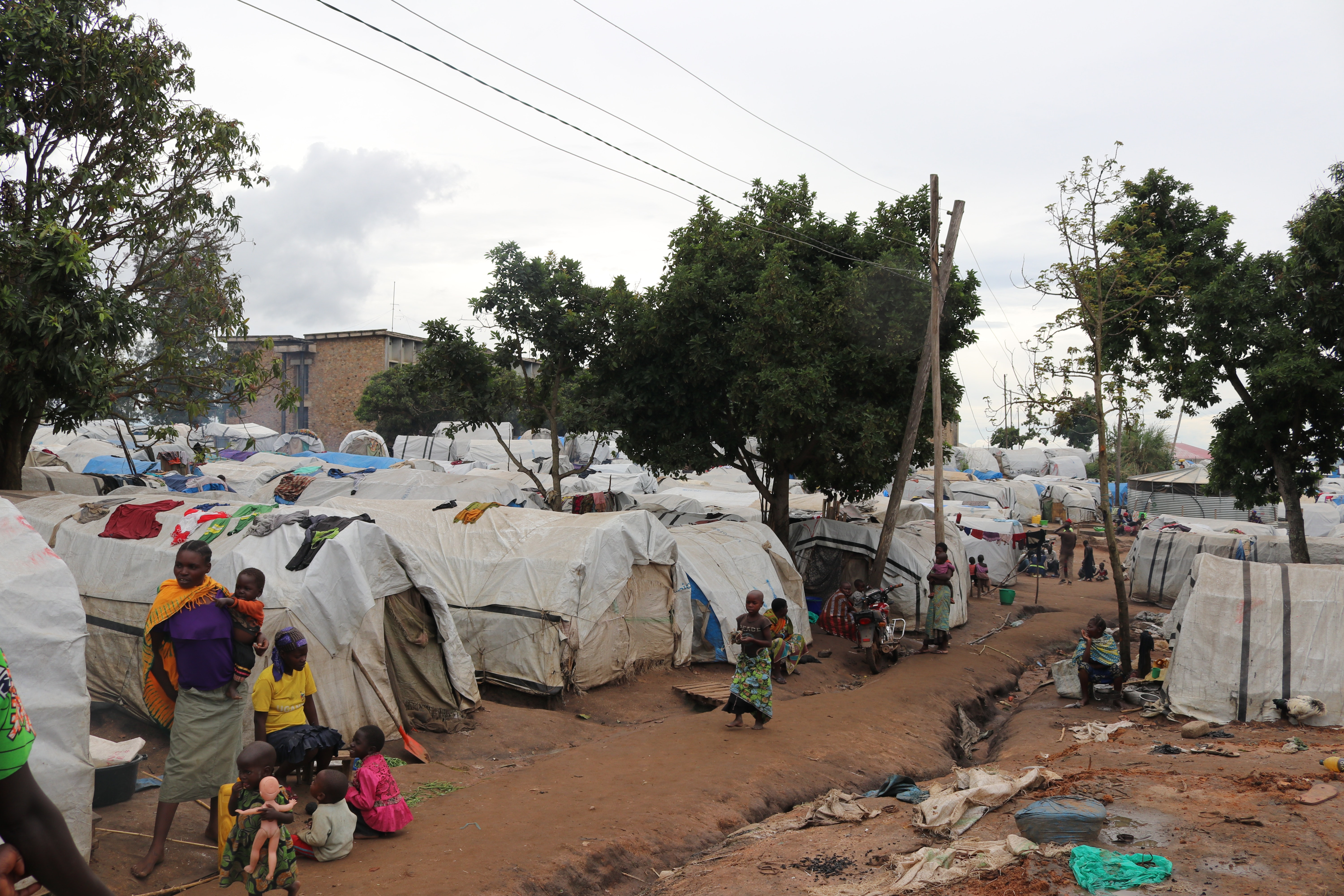
People living in squatter camps after being displaced due to climate change disasters.

Climate change is a global phenomenon with wide-ranging and profound impacts on various aspects of human life. Beyond its well-known environmental consequences, climate change significantly affects human health, including the realm of sexual and reproductive health and rights (SRHRs). Nowhere are these impacts more pronounced than in Africa, a continent that is particularly vulnerable to the effects of climate change due to its socio-economic, geographic, and ecological factors. Understanding the intersection between climate change and SRHRs is crucial for developing holistic and effective strategies to address these interconnected challenges.

According to the International Institute for Sustainable Development (IISD), climate change has a significant impact on sexual and reproductive health and rights (SRHRs) in Africa. The report states that barriers to the realization of SRHR inhibit progress toward gender equality and may impede climate action. At the same time, the impacts of climate change may negatively affect SRHR, for example, through interruptions in sexual and reproductive health services caused by extreme weather events.

== The Impacts of Climate Change on SRHRs ==
Extreme weather events can reduce access to SRHR services, as such increase the rate of sexual risk behavior and lead to early sexual debut, higher prevalence of infectious diseases, and sexual abuse and exploitation Climate change can have negative impacts on maternal health and create conditions that result in increases in gender-based violence, including harmful practices such as child marriage. A study of 21 sub-Saharan African countries comprising nearly 300,000 respondents examining the impacts of long-term temperature increases on HIV found long periods of droughts were associated with increased HIV prevalence and other STI's. The study also showed that droughts were more likely to have impact on those people living in rural areas, younger age groups, and increased engagement in transactional sex The consequences of climate change are diverse, severe, and predicted to worsen over the coming years. Even if temperature changes are maintained in line with the Paris Agreement (that is to limit temperature increases to below 2 °C, and preferably below 1.5 °C, compared to pre-industrial levels), there will be significant impacts on biodiversity, water availability, food security, and health.

=== Impacts on Women and Girls ===
The effects of climate change disproportionately affect women and girls, who often bear the brunt of its consequences. When climate-related disasters strike, women and girls face heightened vulnerabilities, putting them at greater risk of gender-based violence. This is made worse by how sexual and reproductive health issues are overlooked during disasters. Displacement from their homes can lead to early marriages for young girls as their families struggle to provide for them. Child marriage exposes girls to higher risks of intimate partner violence due to power imbalances in these relationships. This stems from cultural norms that allow women and children less decision power and the ability to relocate when facing climate change.

The far-reaching consequences of climate change on SRHRs have been the subject of research in Uganda, Kenya, Malawi, Mozambique, and the Sahel. The studies have found that women and girls face limited access to healthcare services during climate-related disasters. The lack of resources, such as clean water and menstrual products, further hampers their ability to manage their health with dignity. These negative impacts are felt most by girls and women, and individuals who have already experienced multiple barriers to the realization of their SRHR. In particular, adolescents; sex workers; people living with disabilities; or those of underrepresented sexual orientation, gender identity, gender expression, and sex characteristics face significant barriers in accessing SRHR information and services, including in humanitarian settings.

=== Specific Impacts on Maternal Health ===
Climate change contributes to food insecurity and consequently impacts maternal health. This is largely because of the economic consequences of climate change. For example, during the Ethiopian famine of 1984-85, it was reported that women and infants were more likely to die from inequitable access to food resources.

Specifically, in Africa, there are higher rates of malnutrition among women who are pregnant and breastfeeding. This causes negative repercussions on the health of children. Across 19 African countries climate change has caused decreases in birth weights because of the lack of maternal nutrition. Furthermore, in cases of natural disaster, women are more likely to have negative reproductive outcomes that range from premature delivery to preeclampsia.

The impacts are made worse by infectious diseases that spread faster with a weakened infrastructure and agricultural deficits. Across the regions of West Africa, Central Africa, and east and Southern Africa, children born from mothers with malaria were recorded to be twice as likely to be underweight.

=== Sexually Transmitted Diseases ===
Insecurity caused by extreme weather events can lead to increased rates of risky sexual behavior, including condom less sex and transactional sex that causes higher prevalence of infectious and sexual diseases. A study of about 300,000 individuals in sub-Saharan Africa has shown that this has caused increased risk of STIs and HIV especially during long periods of drought and long term temperature increases. Furthermore the study showed that younger age groups have higher risks of infection during transactional sex. A study in Lesotho has also revealed that teenaged girls face an additional 11% risk of being HIV-positive following a drought crisis. Migration from climate change also exacerbates the issues as many people see the move as a protective move and do not recognize that it may provoke sexual and reproductive health crises.

=== Challenges in Accessing SRHR Services ===
During climate-related disasters, healthcare services, including sexual and reproductive health services, are often limited or unavailable. This lack of access leaves women without the necessary medical support during childbirth, risking their health and that of their newborns. Additionally, the absence of clean water and menstrual products hinders women's and girls' ability to manage menstruation with dignity, further impacting their SRHRs.

Challenges are made worse with climate-induced migration. With a prediction of 85.7 million climate migrants in sub-Saharan Africa by 2050, Africa faces one of the worst refugee crisis of the generation. When entire communities are forced to move during climate change migration there is a lack of access to lifesaving sexual and reproductive health services and programs. Migrant and refugee women face the risk of rape, unwanted pregnancy, and unsafe abortion. This often leads to further issues of depression and social isolation.

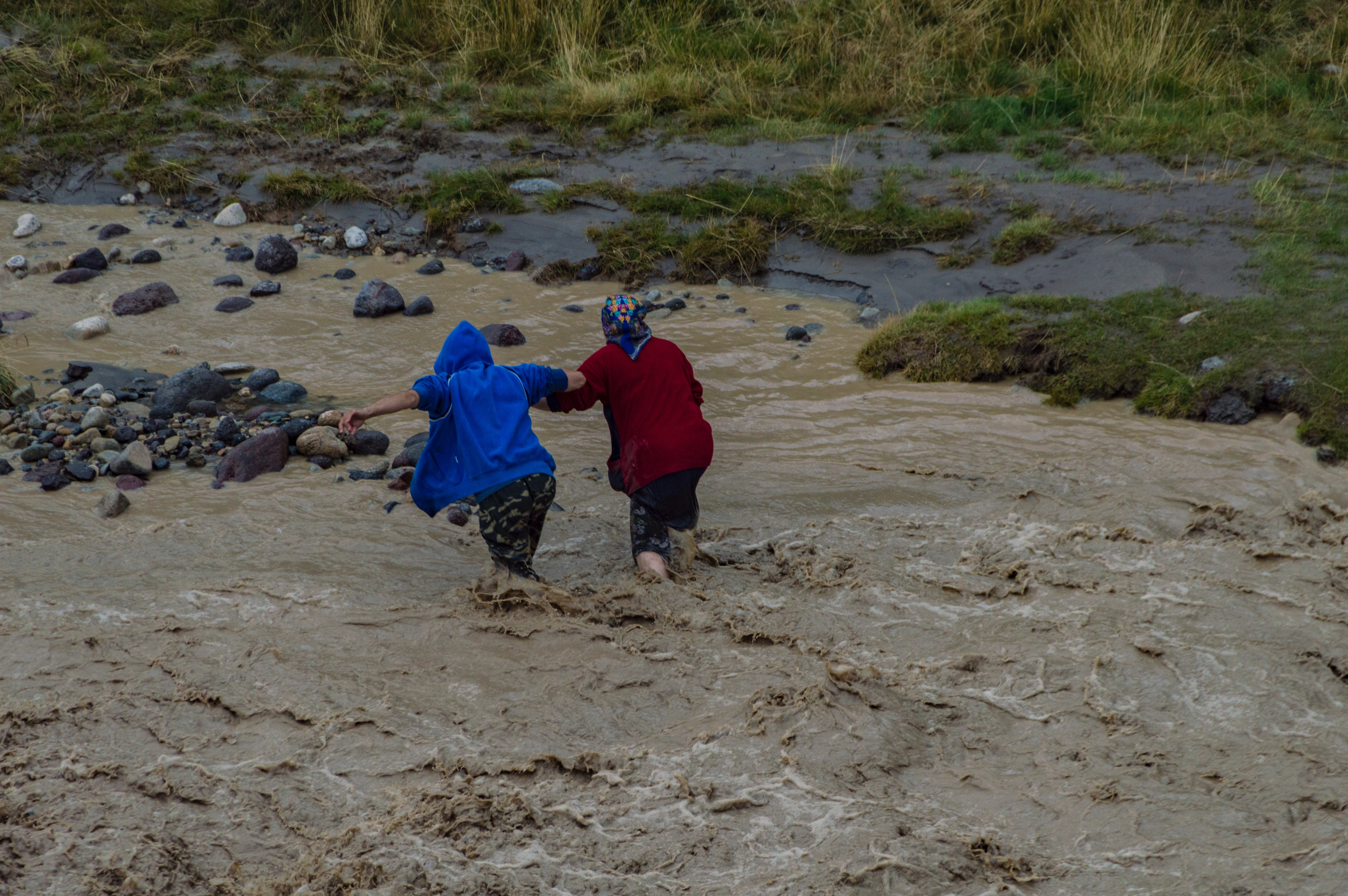
This show women crossing through flooded water

=== Exacerbation of Vulnerabilities for Marginalized Groups ===
For marginalized and vulnerable populations, as well as those with disabilities, the impact of climate change compounds their existing challenges and vulnerabilities. These groups face additional barriers in accessing healthcare, adapting to changing environmental conditions, and recovering from climate-related disasters. The intersectionality of social, economic, and health disparities further exacerbates their vulnerability to the impacts of climate change.

== Proposed Policy Solutions ==
With the rise of concerns about climate change's impact on communities, the African Union met in October 2022 to discuss green recovery efforts. They created Africa's Agenda 2063 that covered socio-economic transformations to mitigate the effects of changing geographical developments. Within their strategy, they highlighted the intersectionality of climate change and gender problems and why women and youth needed to be included in their plans. This follows a IPCC report from 2007 that marked how climate change would effect food insecurity, chronic diseases, and public health gains.

These proposals are important to the greater wellbeing of African nations because gender-aware policies play an important role in reaching the inclusive agricultural growth to meet the commitments outlined in the Malabo Declaration. United States has announced plans to help the continent reach its goal of securing sexual and reproductive health. For instance at the US-Africa Business forum plans were passed to create a regional Transport Compact with Niger and Benin that included $7.5 million for entrepreneurship and training programs for women, to mitigate HIV/AIDS, gender-based violence, trafficking in persons risks, and road enhancements to support poor and vulnerable women who sell their goods along the transport corridors.

=== Uganda - National Climate Change Policy (NCCP) ===
The Uganda National Climate Change Policy identifies vulnerable populations and highlights them in climate change adaptation and mitigation efforts. In particular they identify issues that relate to women and children. Their efforts have been geared towards mitigation of future population growth by strengthening family planning and reproductive health. They hope to achieve this through strategies such as Climate Smart Agriculture (CSA). The Ugandan government has also pressed for improved education curricula to ensure increased social awareness of risks to reproductive and sexual health associated with climate change as well as to train professionals tasked to address these risks.
