= Bolsa Família =

Government social welfare program in Brazil

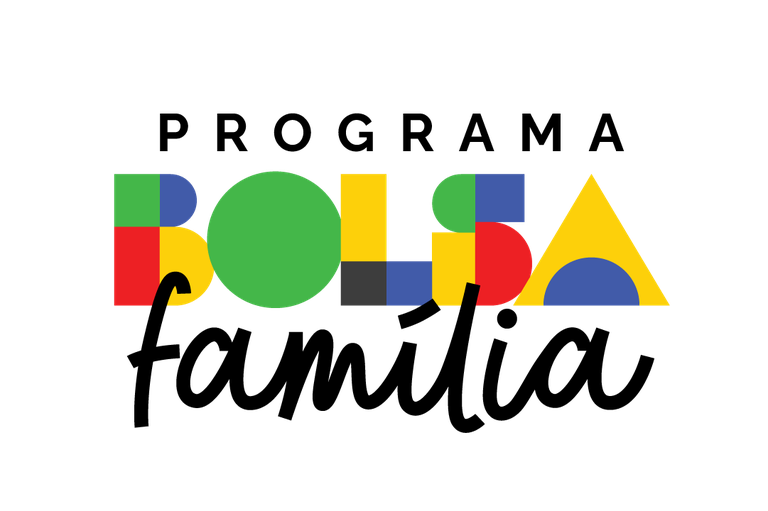
Program logo

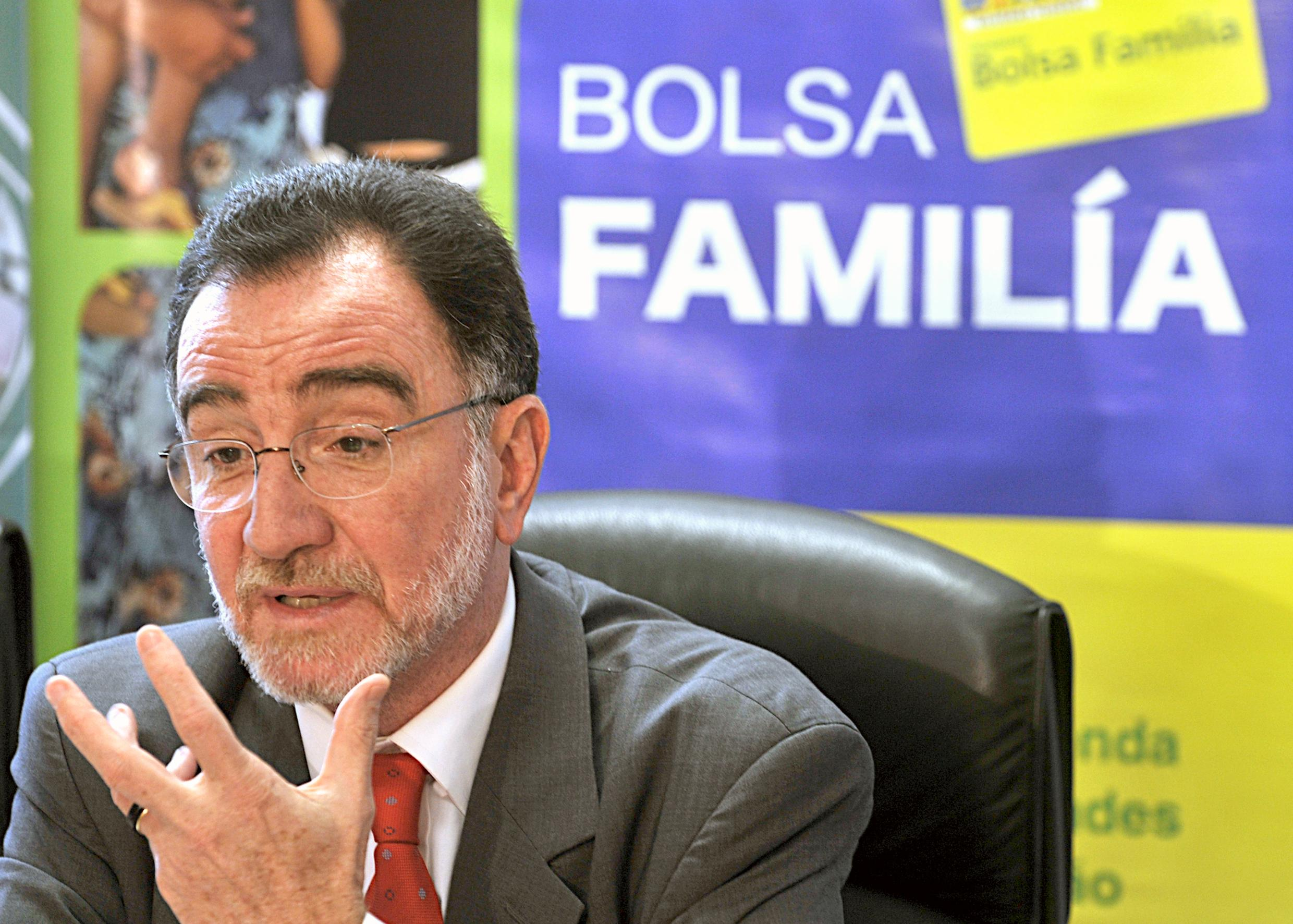
Minister of Social Development and Hunger Alleviation Patrus Ananias discussing the program

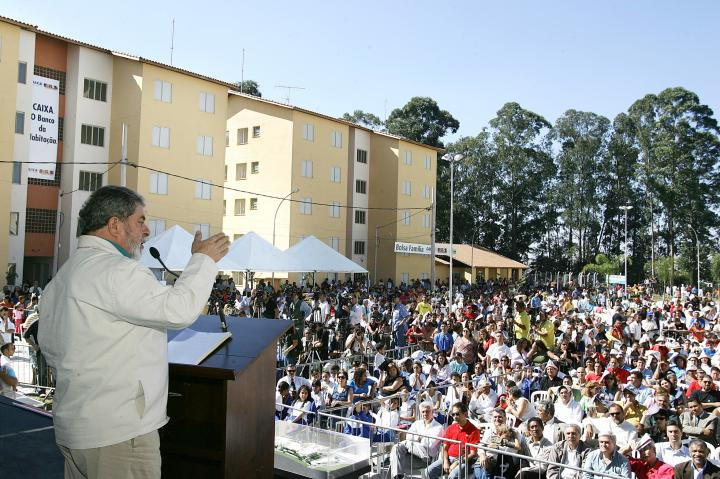
President Lula giving a speech to recipients of Bolsa Família and other federal assistance programs in Diadema, São Paulo

Bolsa Família (Portuguese: [ˈbowsɐ fɐˈmiʎɐ], Family Allowance) is the current social welfare program of the Government of Brazil, part of the Fome Zero network of federal assistance programs. Bolsa Família provides financial aid to poor Brazilian families. In order to be eligible, families had to ensure that children attend school and get vaccinated. If they exceeded the total of permitted school absences, they were dropped from the program and their funds were suspended. The program attempted to both reduce short-term poverty by direct cash transfers and fight long-term poverty by increasing human capital among the poor through conditional cash transfers. It also worked to give free education to children who could not afford to go to school, to show the importance of education.

In 2008, The Economist described Bolsa Família as an "anti-poverty scheme invented in Latin America [which] is winning converts worldwide." The program was a centerpiece of current president Luiz Inácio Lula da Silva's social policy and is reputed to have played a role in his victory in the general election of 2006. Bolsa Família was the largest conditional cash transfer program in the world, though the Mexican Oportunidades was the first nationwide program of this kind.

Bolsa Família has been mentioned as one factor contributing to the reduction of poverty in Brazil, which fell 27.7% during the first term in the administration of Lula. In 2006, the Center for Political Studies of the Getulio Vargas Foundation published a study showing that there was a sharp reduction in the number of people in poverty in Brazil between 2003 and 2005. Other factors included an improvement in the job market and real gains in the minimum wage. About twelve million Brazilian families received funds from Bolsa Família. The government cash transfer program in South Africa, for comparison, had 17.5 million individual beneficiaries in 2018 (over 75% of its labour force of 23 million) receiving a total of over US$20 billion per annum in state aid.

In 2011, 26% of the Brazilian population were covered by the program. As of 2020, the program covered 13.8 million families and paid an average of $34 per month, in a country where the minimum wage is $190 per month.

On 30 December 2021, Jair Bolsonaro sanctioned a new cash transfer program, called Auxílio Brasil, formally ending Bolsa Família. However, after Lula's reelection as president of Brazil in 2022, he declared that he would rename the program back to Bolsa Família, putting an end to Auxílio Brasil. In 2023, the second version of the program is launched with the promise of financial transfers of at least 600 Brazilian Real.

== History ==
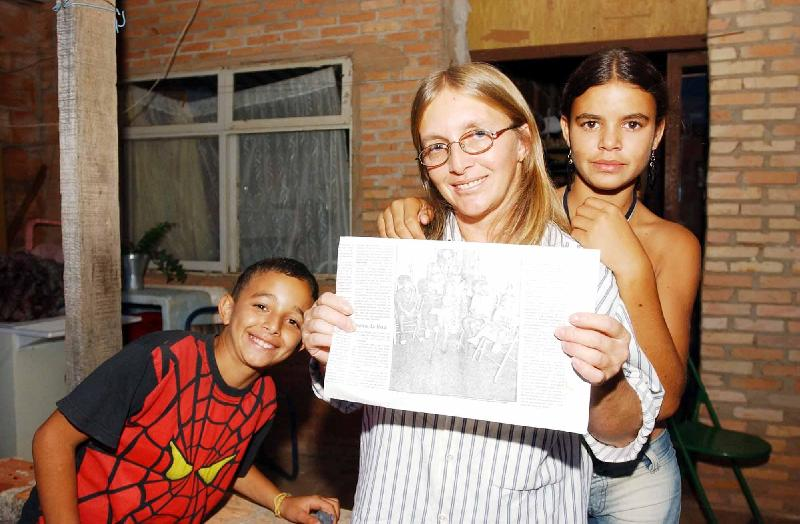
The family of Selma Ferreira was the first recipient of Bolsa Escola, a precursor to Bolsa Família enacted by Governor Cristovam Buarque of the Federal District in 1995.

Bolsa Escola, a predecessor which was conditional only on school attendance, was pioneered in Brasília by then-governor Cristovam Buarque. Not long after, other municipalities and states adopted similar programs. In 2001 the President Fernando Henrique Cardoso federalized the program, increasing to attend approximately 8 million people. In 2003, Lula formed Bolsa Família by combining Bolsa Escola with Bolsa Alimentação and Cartão Alimentação and Auxílio Gas (a transfer to compensate for the end of federal gas subsidies), all part of Fernando Henrique Cardoso social program called "Rede de Proteção Social". This also meant the creation of a new Ministry – the Ministério do Desenvolvimento Social e Combate à Fome (Ministry for Social Development and Confronting Hunger). This merger reduced administrative costs and also eased bureaucratic complexity for both the families involved and the administration of the program.

In October 2021, the program Auxílio Brasil was announced, with the purpose of replacing Bolsa Família and unify other cash transfer programs in Brazil. The new program will pay $71 to 17 million families until the end of 2022. On 30 December 2021, president Jair Bolsonaro sanctioned the new program, formally ending Bolsa Família.

== Objectives ==
Programs employing various types of conditional cash transfer are social policies currently employed in many places in the world to fight and reduce poverty. In the short term, the aim is to mitigate the problems resulting from poverty. In the long term, the goal is to invest in human capital and interrupt the transgenerational cycle of poverty (i.e. from one generation to another). Conditional cash transfer programs began to gain strength in 1997. At the time there were only three countries in the world with this experience: Bangladesh, Mexico and Brazil.

== Benefit ==
Bolsa Família currently gives families with per-capita monthly income below $140 BRL (poverty line, ~US$28) a monthly stipend of $32 BRL (~US$6) per vaccinated child (< 16 years old) attending school (up to 5), and $38 BRL (~US$8) per youth (16 or 17 years old) attending school (up to 2). Furthermore, to families whose per-capita monthly income below $70 BRL (extreme poverty line, ~US$14), the program gives the Basic Benefit $70 BRL per month.

This money is given preferentially to a female head of household, through so-called Citizen Cards which are mailed to the family. This card operates like a debit card and is issued by the Caixa Econômica Federal, a government-owned savings bank (the second largest bank in the country). The money can be withdrawn in over 14,000 Caixa bank locations. This practice helps to reduce corruption, a long problem in Brazil, and helps to dissociate the receipt of money from individual politicians or political parties. The names of every person enlisted in the program and the amount given to them can be found online at the Portal da Transparência, the program's website.

== Structure ==
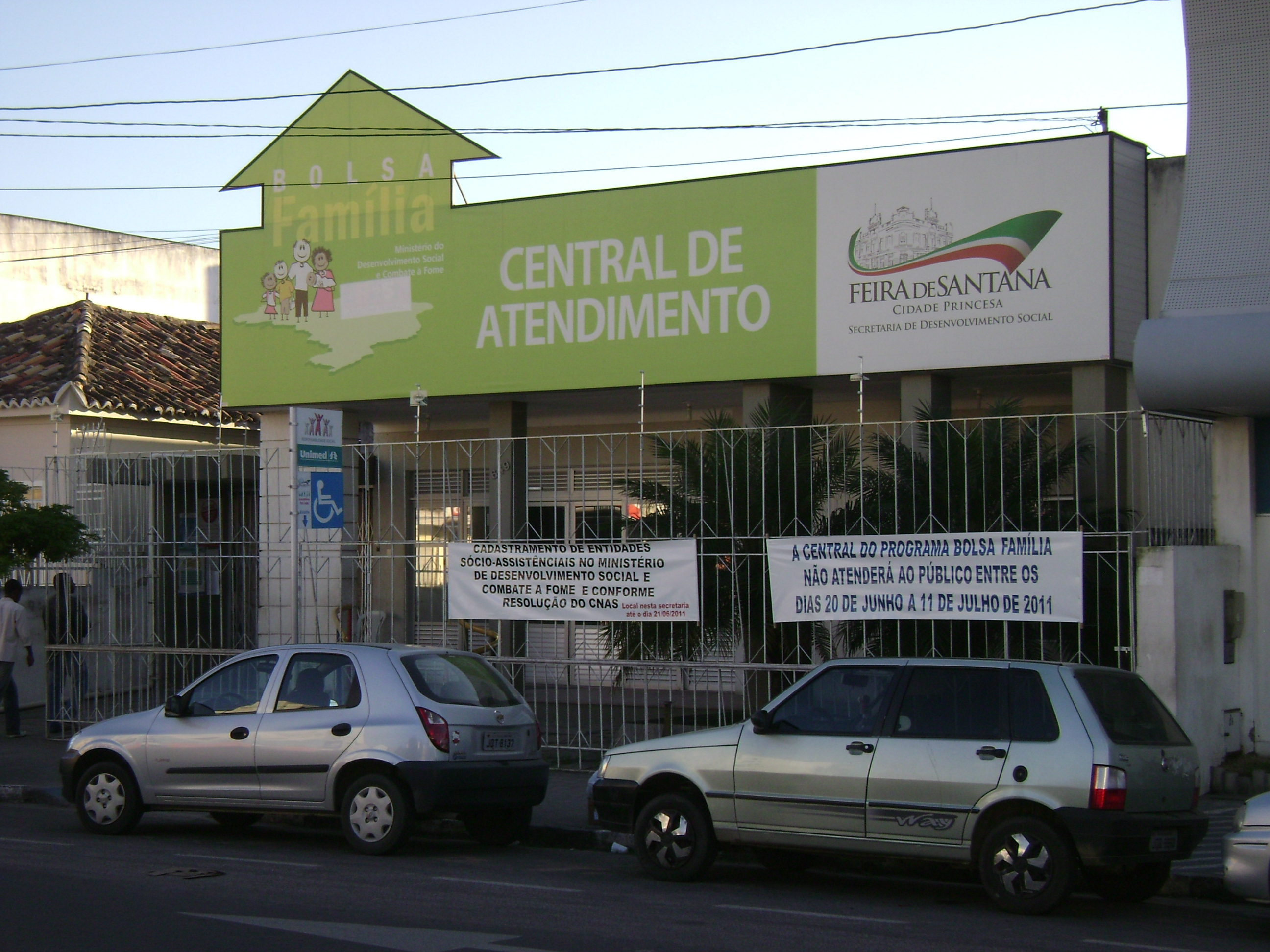
Central to the beneficiaries of Bolsa Família in Feira de Santana, Bahia

=== Political structure ===
Brazil has a strong federal system, defined by the resource base of states, the power of governors, the articulation of subnational interests within the Brazilian National Congress, and the distribution of government across three levels. As a result, state governors are able to constrain the central government. This is possible due to a weak, fragmented, and institutionalized party system. Fragmentation makes it difficult for non-consensual forms to reach the central level, creating policy challenges for national leaders. Additionally, fragmentation makes it difficult for national leaders to reach a consensus when creating policies.

Cash transfer programs had previously existed in the Cardoso administration - Bolsa Escola, Bolsa Alimentação, Auxílio Gás. Most of these early programs faced internal organization challenges. Bolsa Escola was superior to other programs because it applied to all citizens and both supported and was associated with education.

During Lula's first administration, his goal was to create a social program to replace the three previously existing programs of Cardoso's government. He unified all prior programs to create one and provided a monetary amount per month that would allow households to rise above the poverty line.

As a redistributive program, Bolsa Familia depends on central-local collaboration. Municipal governments act as the main agents of the federal government. Bolsa Família avoids negotiations between the executive and legislative branches. The central government's ability to bypass twenty-seven powerful governors demonstrates that federalism in Brazil is a three-level game. In addition, state brokers cannot claim credit because it cuts out the intermediaries. Bolsa Família resolved intra-bureaucratic chaos by creating one program controlled by the national executive branch. It reduced administrative costs and facilitated user access.

Aside from the ability to bypass state involvement, there are additional enabling factors such as the interaction of a non-majoritarian system of government and fiscal incentives for central-local collaborations. Because of these factors, Bolsa Família helped reduce hunger and poverty. The dynamic relationship between the federal center and municipalities enabled a direct relationship between citizens and the government. The hardening budget constraints put in place by Cardoso's administration to stabilize macroeconomic performance gave municipalities an incentive to collaborate with the central government. Their collaboration helps them meet their required percentage that they are legally required to spend on social assistance. Municipalities that adhere to the program sign a covenant with the federal government, which guarantees the program's promotion and availability of public services.

The federal center and municipalities' abilities to collaborate with each other have facilitated Brazil's capability to build an effective welfare policy for the poor. The existence of a power sharing logic in Brazil enabled a widespread means tested social program that was able to achieve success nationwide.

=== Use of the money ===
Surveys conducted by the Federal Government among Bolsa Família's beneficiaries indicate that the money is spent, in order of priority, on food; school supplies; clothing; and shoes. A study conducted by The Federal University of Pernambuco, using sophisticated statistical methods, inferred that 87% of the money is used, by families living in rural areas, to buy food. Data from 2014 to 2015 showed that 3.8% of the population (7.6 million people) still earns less than US$1 a day, and this is linked to malnutrition, that is still a problem in Brazil and responsible by 4.3 deaths per 100,000 people per year.

=== Control and monitoring ===
A system of control and monitoring of the Bolsa Família Program was inaugurated in December 2006, which uses satellites and the internet via radio waves, which allows the exchange of data with the Municipalities of more remote locations, even in that there is no electricity or telephone.

Brazil is already exporting this technology that it has developed for similar income transfer programs. In August 2007, it signed a technical cooperation agreement with the Dominican Republic. The partnership includes the Brazilian aid in the modernization of the system of registrations of the families and the exchange of information between governmental instances.

The students' presence in classes is monitored bimonthly by the MEC and the Ministry of Social Development and Fight against Hunger (MDS). A family that fails to comply with five consecutive times has its benefit permanently canceled.

== Cost and coverage ==
In 2006, Bolsa Familia is estimated to cost about 0.5% of Brazilian GDP and about 2.5% of total government expenditure. It will cover about 11.2 million families, or about 44 million Brazilians.

The Bolsa Família was criticized by political opponents of President Lula for allegedly using the revenues of the CPMF tax (which was originally created under the pretext of financing the public health system during the Fernando Henrique Cardoso administration; the CPMF tax expired in December 2007, and was not renewed) for political and electoral purposes, to the detriment of the public health system that currently faces enormous difficulties.

== Perception ==
The reaction from multilateral institutions to Bolsa Família has generally been enthusiastic. During a trip to Brazil in 2005, the former president of the World Bank, Paul Wolfowitz said, "Bolsa Familia has already become a highly praised model of effective social policy. Countries around the world are drawing lessons from Brazil's experience and are trying to produce the same results for their own people."

== Criticism ==
Certain sectors of the Brazilian society, both among the conservatives and the progressives, oppose the concept of money transfers to the poor:

"This concept has always been controversial in Brazil. In other countries it is not this way, but in Brazil there has always been resistance. When I was in college they (the opponents to the concept of money transfers) used to say: 'the first thing the poor will do with the money is to get themselves drunk'. Later on, it was no longer getting drunk that people talked about; they would say the money transferred would be used by the poor to buy a battery radio. They assumed that people with less education would not use their money wisely."

Q. Does that resistance make sense? A: No. In the 1980s (São Paulo State) Governor Franco Montoro had created a money transfer program to benefit families which were receiving their sons back home, coming out of "FEBEM" (the Brazilian punitive institution for minors). As it was very, very little money, families would get together to do house-raising, each month on somebody's house. Or families would save for months, to be able to buy a popcorn wagon for a youth who now had to start working. At the same time other programs, which provided food, failed because they did not take into account regional habits. Here in São Paulo, for instance, the Federal Government distributed tons of black beans, which are only eaten in Rio. People threw it away.

The Bolsa Família Program is far from being universally accepted by the Brazilian society. Among the various criticisms it receives, one of the most recurrent is the assertion that it could discourage the search for employment, encouraging laziness. Under this premise, many people would give up trying to find a job, content instead, to live on the Bolsa Família program. The World Bank, however, finds that the program does not discourage work, nor social advancement. To the contrary, says Bénédicte de la Brière, responsible for the program monitoring at the institution:

"Adult work is not impacted by income transfers. In some cases adults will even work harder because having this safety net encourages them to assume greater risks in their activities"'

Another criticism of the program is the fact that it is perceived by opponents of the currently ruling party as way to "buy" to votes of poor people, creating clientelism.

Many Brazilians recognize that the Bolsa Família program has potential for reducing absolute poverty and to reduce inter-generational transmission of poverty. For one example among many, Renata de Camargo Nacimento (heir to the powerful, Brazilian multi-billionaire Camargo Correa Group), when asked in an interview if she agreed that Bolsa Família is just a form of charity, answered as follows: "I travel a lot around Brazil and see many places where the average monthly income is BRL 50 (approximately US$ 26.32). In these places the Bolsa Familia comes in and adds an extra BRL 58. It makes all the difference in the world and adds a lot for the needy population. What is more important is that it promotes a virtuous circle. If there is more money in circulation, the local market heats up, the purchasing power is increased and the effects spread throughout the whole economy. But only to give money is not enough.(...)"

== Outcomes and effects ==
The program has clearly contributed to improvements in Brazil's fight against poverty, according to research promoted by some universities and the Brazilian Institute of Geography and Statistics (IBGE). An ex ante econometric evaluation of Bolsa Escola found a significant increase in school attendance rates and decrease in the number of children involved in child labor.

The World Bank, which provided a loan to assist the Brazilian government in managing the Bolsa Família Program, declares that "Although the program is relatively young, some results are already apparent: (...) contributions to improved education outcomes, and impacts on children's growth, food consumption, and diet quality".

A study by the UNDP's International Policy Centre for Inclusive Growth found that over 80% of the Bolsa Familia benefits go to families in poverty (making under half the minimum wage per capita), thus most of the benefits go to the poor. Bolsa Familia was also found to have been responsible for about 20% of the drop in inequality in Brazil since 2001, which is welcome in one of the most unequal countries on the planet.

Research promoted by the World Bank shows a significant reduction in child labor exploitation among children benefited by the Bolsa Família program.

One positive effect of the program which is not immediately apparent is that it makes a significant impact on the ability of the poorest families to eat. Children in public schools receive one free meal a day—two in the poorest areas—so less of their family's limited income is needed to pay for food. In a survey of Bolsa Familia recipients, 82.4% reported eating better; additionally, it was reported to increase the incomes of the poorer families by about 25%. Recipients of Bolsa Familia were found to have 6 percent higher food expenditure and 9.4% total energy availability than non-recipients.

In 2018, it was found that an increase in the Bolsa Família coverage was associated with a reduction in suicide rates between 2004 and 2012 even when controlling for socio-economic, demographic and social welfare factors. It was also shown that the reduction in suicide rates increased when high coverage (equal to or greater than 70%) was maintained for multiple years.

According to a 2023 study, 64% of the poor children (ages 7 to 16) who were enrolled in Bolsa Familia in 2005 no longer participated in the family cash transfer program by 2019, contradicting previous criticism that the program's recipients would intentionally fail to find jobs in order to keep their monetary benefits.

== International participations ==
The "Project Family Grant" of the World Bank, inaugurated in June 2005, collaborates with the Bolsa Familia program, consolidating the various income transfer programs - previously dispersed - reducing their failures and duplication of coverage, strengthening the Scholarship management system To the family and identifying its target audience, as well as developing and monitoring a scientific method to evaluate the effects of the program, and strengthening the basic institutional aspects of its administration.

The World Bank studies reveal that, although the program is very new, positive measurable results have already been recorded in the consumption of food, in the quality of the diet, and in the growth of children. Kathy Lindert, head of the Bolsa Familia project team, lists a series of challenges that the Bolsa Família will have to face in the future, such as clear definition of objectives, monitoring, and evaluation, to ensure that the program does not become an isolated island, but is complemented by investments in education, health, and infrastructure, helping families, in their words, "to graduate" (i.e., to leave) the program.

== See also ==
- Auxílio Brasil
- Basic income
- Child labor
- Fome Zero
- Lulism
- Poverty
- Zero Hunger: Political Culture and Antipoverty Policy in Northeast Brazil

== Bibliography ==
- BRITTO, Tatiana Feitosa de. Conditional Cash Transfers: Why Have They Become So Prominent in Recent Poverty Reduction Strategies in Latin America. Institute of Social Studies 390(2004)
- RAWLINGS, Laura B. e RUBIO, Gloria M. Evaluating the Impact of Conditional Cash Transfer Programs – Lessons from Latin America, Volume 1, World Bank Policy Research Working Paper 3119, August 2003, The World Bank, 2003.
- YAP, Yoon-Tien, Guilherme Sedlacek and Peter Orazem. 2001. Limiting Child Labor Through Behavior-Based Income Transfers: An Experimental Evaluation of the PETI Program in Rural Brazil. World Bank, Washington, DC
- WORLD BANK. 2001a. Brazil: An Assessment of the Bolsa Escola Programs. Human Development Department, Latin America and Caribbean Region, The World Bank, Washington, DC.
