= Auxílio Brasil =

Government social welfare program in Brazil

Auxílio Brasil (Portuguese pronunciation: [awˈsili.u bɾaˈziw]; "Brazil Assistance") was the social welfare program of the Government of Brazil, created during the presidency of Jair Bolsonaro. Announced in October 2021, the provisional measure (MP, short for medida provisória) was sanctioned by Bolsonaro after passing through both legislative houses (the Brazilian Chamber of Deputies and Brazilian Senate) on 30 December 2021, replacing Bolsa Família. However, after Lula's re-election as president of Brazil in 2022, he declared that he would rename the program to Bolsa Família, putting an end to Auxílio Brasil.

== History ==
In July 2020, the Minister of Economy Paulo Guedes proposed a new program to replace Bolsa Família and other social programs. The program, called "Renda Brasil", would be the sole cash transfer program, unifying several existing social programs, such as the financial assistance given during the COVID-19 pandemic. His proposal also provided for an increase in the value of the benefits paid by Bolsa Família. However, on September 15 of the same year, President Bolsonaro announced that the "Renda Brasil" proposal was cancelled due to difficulties in finding ways to fund it.

On September 28, 2020, "Renda Cidadã" was proposed. Its funds would come from the use of financial resources used to pay precatórios – government debts after a court decision – and allocate part of the funds of Fundeb to the new cash transfer program.

On August 9, 2021, the provisional measure 1061–21 is published on Diário Oficial da União, which meant it would go into effect 90 days after its publication, replacing Bolsa Família. On October 20, 2021, Auxílio Brasil was announced by the federal government, promising monthly payments of 400 reais until 2022, and a permanent adjustment of 20% compared to the amount paid by Bolsa Família. The MP was approved in Congress on November 25, 2021 and on December 2, 2021, in the Senate. The approval of the constitutional amendment to reform the payment of precatórios allowed the government an estimated R$106 billion to pay the R$400 monthly payments to the recipients of the program until the end of 2022.

The efforts to replace Bolsa Família were criticized by opposition parties, accusing Bolsonaro of boosting social spending to boost his re-election chances in the 2022 Brazilian general election. In the press, The Economist criticized the new program because it "added complexity and uncertainty", and criticized the constitutional amendment that reformed the payment of precatórios. In an editorial, Folha de S.Paulo mentioned that the program focuses on the poor – a demographic with whom Bolsonaro polls poorly – but does not address the financial difficulties of large families. In an opinion poll by Datafolha, 43% of Brazilians reacted negatively to the changes, and 41% reacting positively.

== Benefits and values ==
The minimum value for the financial aid was raised to R$600.00 after the enactment of PEC 15/2022, valid until the end of 2022.

The Brazil Aid is composed of 9 financial benefits, with different requirements. These benefits include:

- Early Childhood Benefit
- Family Composition Benefit
- Overcoming Extreme Poverty Benefit
- School Sports Allowance
- Junior Scientific Initiation Scholarship
- Rural Productive Inclusion Aid
- Urban Productive Inclusion Aid
- Transitional Compensatory Benefit
