= Portal da Transparência =

Portal da Transparência (Portuguese pronunciation: [poʁˈtaw dɐ tɾɐ̃spaˈɾẽsiɐ]) is a Brazilian government portal dedicated to making public all expenditures of the federal government. It has a list of all expenses and money transfers the federal government has made, including the list of all people receiving Bolsa Família benefits and how much they have received.
