= Climate change and gender =

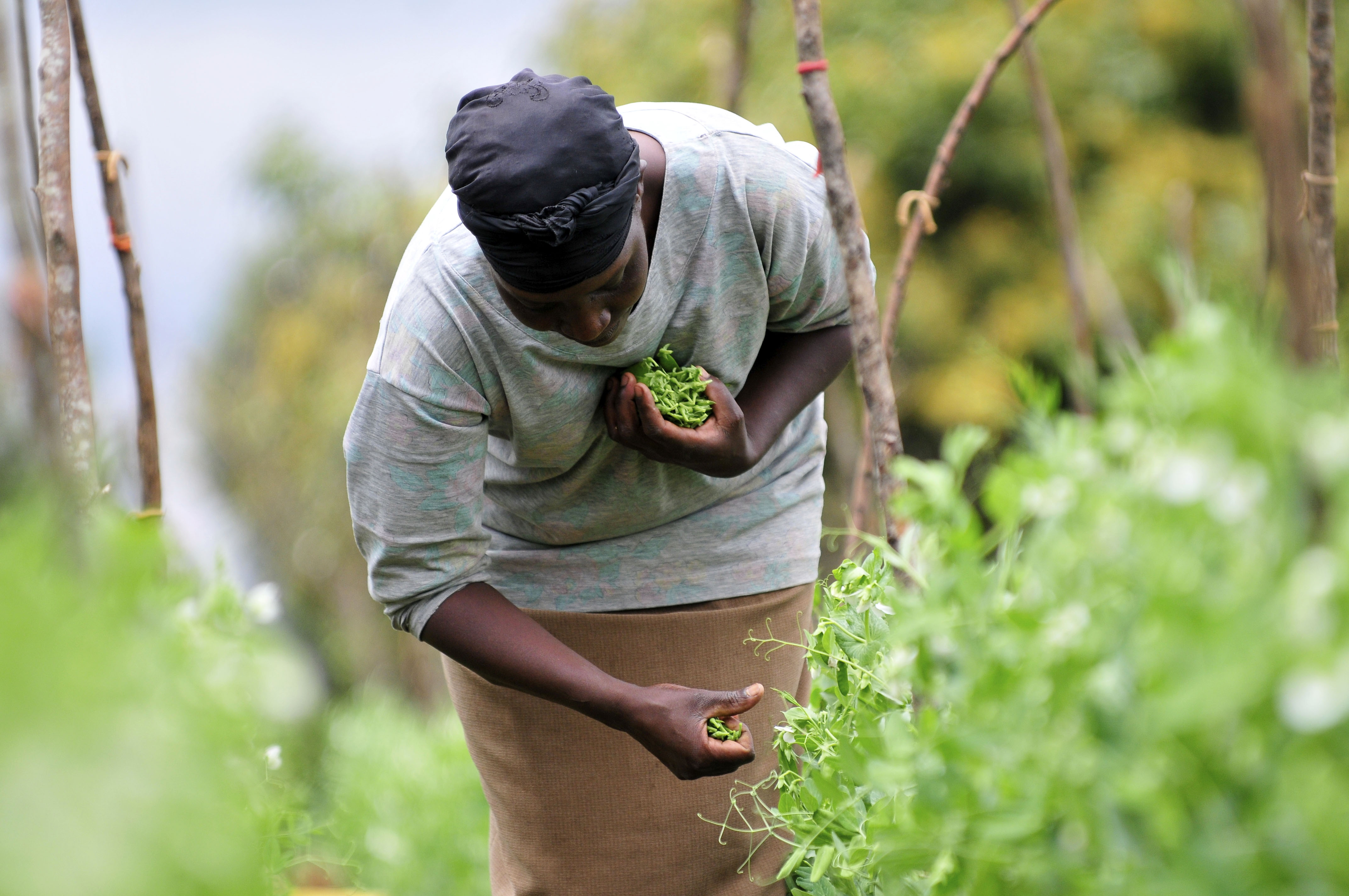
Kenya harvest by woman farmer. Women smallholder farms are important suppliers of food for communities around the world, especially in the global south. Women frequently face restrictions on access to resources and land and small farms have a harder time adapting to climate change.

Climate change affects men and women differently. Climate change and gender is a research topic which aims to understand how men and women access and use resources that are impacted by climate change and how they experience the resulting impacts. It examines how gender roles and cultural norms influence the ability of men and women to respond to climate change, and how women's and men's roles can be better integrated into climate change adaptation and mitigation strategies. It also considers how climate change intersects with other socioeconomic challenges, such as poverty, access to resources, migration, and cultural identity.

== Research goals ==
Ultimately, the goal of this research is to ensure that climate change policies and initiatives are equitable, and that both women and men benefit from them. Climate change increases gender inequality, reduces women's ability to be financially independent, and has an overall negative impact on the social and political rights of women, especially in economies that are heavily based on agriculture. In many cases, gender inequality means that women are more vulnerable to the negative effects of climate change. This is due to gender roles, particularly in the developing world, which means that women are often dependent on the natural environment for subsistence and income. By further limiting women's already constrained access to physical, social, political, and fiscal resources, climate change often burdens women more than men and can magnify existing gender inequality.

Gender-based differences have also been identified in relation to awareness, causation and response to climate change, and many countries have developed and implemented gender-based climate change strategies and action plans. For example, the government of Mozambique adopted a Gender, Environment and Climate Change Strategy and Action Plan in early 2010, being the first government in the world to do so. Businesses with gender-diverse boards have been found 60% more likely to minimise energy usage and 40% more likely to reduce greenhouse gas emissions. Women and men experience climate change and environmental degradation differently according to gender roles and societal conventions.

Analysis of gender in climate change, however, is not limited to women. It also means not only applying a binary male/female system of analysis on sets of quantitative data, but also scrutinizing discursive constructions that shapes power relations connected to climate change, and considering how gender, as a social factor that influences responses to climate change, intersects with other variables such as age, caste, marital status, and ethnicity. This binary also excludes individuals who are a part of the LGBTQ+ community, and those who are non-binary and do not fit into gender norms. To understand the effects climate change has on different populations, there must be a distinction between gender and sex. Gender can be defined as the socially constructed differences between men and women that give rise to masculinity and femininity. Sex can be defined as the biological distinctions between males and females, most often in connection with reproductive functions.

== Public opinion and actions ==
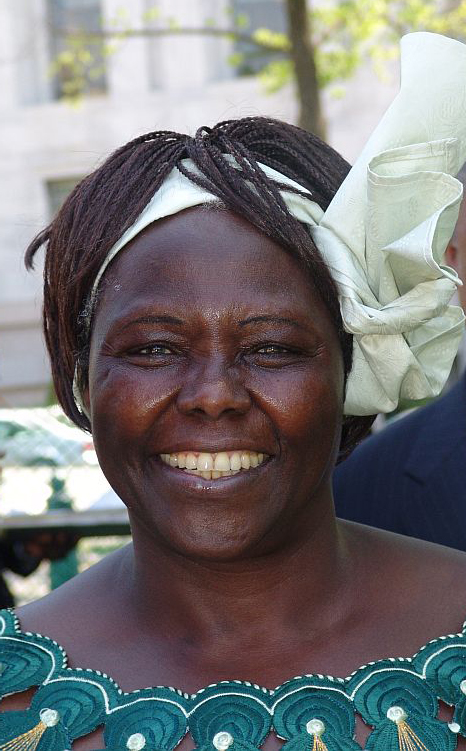
"Women hold the key to Climate's Future" – Wangari Maathai

A study of young people in Finland shows that concern over climate change has a higher impact on climate friendly consumption in women compared to men. A study done in the Czech Republic showcases this phenomenon as well. This may be incidental to differences in perception of climate change. Women tend to agree with the scientific opinion that anthropogenic greenhouse gas emissions are mainly responsible for climate change (m: 56%, f: 64%) and are more concerned about its effects: one 2010 study found 29% of men and 35% of women in the US to "worry about global warming a great deal".

Another study was conducted in 2016 using men and women from Brazil and Sweden to measure and inspect the effects of gender and political orientation on perceptions of climate change. Data was collected via online questionnaires from 367 participants from Brazil consisting of 151 men and 216 women, and 221 participants from Sweden with 75 men and 146 women. The results of the study showed a strong positive correlation between conservative men and denial of climate change in both groups (rSweden = .22, rBrazil = .19) indicating that men (typically with conservative political orientation) are more likely to deny the existence of climate change. Women in both groups mostly showed the opposite results, indicating that women are more likely to believe in the existence of climate change.

A 2010 UNDP Policy Brief study described differences in how the two genders are vulnerable to aspects of climate change. Women's incomes are more vulnerable, while men, who find more employment opportunities in agriculture, are more likely to suffer impairments to adaptation and resilience.

A study published in 2020 found that there are also differences in the coping strategies. The study, conducted among rice farmers in Mazandaran Province in Iran, found that men tend to believe that better techniques for conservation management of land is a good way to manage climate risk, while women believed that education is the most important way to adapt, since they could find out what are the better techniques and technologies to face climate risk.

A key enabler to climate change adaptation is access to useful climate information, however in Sub-Saharan Africa access to information has been found to be gendered with women having poorer access to climate information. In a study published in 2020 of smallholder sugarcane farmers in Malawi, it was found that more women than men do not access forecast information to guide adaptation decisions. Gendered access and preferences of climate information may be tied to varying marital status and well as education and literacy levels among women and men.

Contribution to climate change – through emissions of greenhouse gases – is correlated to gender. A study on car use in Sweden, for example, found that men are likely to use the car more, for longer distances and alone compared to women, thereby emitting more CO_{2} (a greenhouse gas).

In a survey conducted by the European Investment Bank on climate, men were found to be more sceptical about the impact of females in climate action leadership. 50% of women surveyed thought that having more females leaders would make a difference, while only 45% of men thought so. The study indicated the biggest discrepancy in the UK, where 38% of men and 61% of women agreed that women leaders would effectively combat climate change. The European Investment Fund also discovered that businesses run by women had better ESG ratings than other businesses, spend more in renewable energy sources, and invest less in polluting businesses.

Various research shows that nations with higher proportions of women in parliament are more likely to ratify environmental agreements and implement climate change policy, thus female leaders are more likely to favor climate action and sustainability.

== Vulnerability ==
=== Disasters ===
Disasters are unpredictable events that cause harm to people and damage to property, infrastructure, and the environment. They can be natural, such as floods, wildfires, earthquakes, hurricanes, or tsunamis, or they can be man-made, such as oil spills, industrial accidents, and terrorist attacks. Disasters can cause physical, psychological, and economic damage. They can also disrupt social networks, weaken economic systems, and cause a range of physical and mental health impacts. People affected by disasters may face displacement, loss of livelihoods, and disruption of education, among other impacts. In the wake of a disaster, governments, international organizations, and aid agencies may provide relief and assistance to those affected.

Female minus male life expectancy vs. Non-communicable disease death rates, OWID

==== Death rates ====
A study by the London School of Economics found that, in natural disasters in 141 countries, gender differences in deaths correlated to women's economic and social rights in those countries. Due to their social standing, women in developing countries are not generally taught survival skills like swimming or climbing, meaning they are more likely to die in a natural disaster. When women have fewer rights and less power in society, more of them die due to climate change, but when there are equal rights for all groups, death rates are more equally matched.

Women working in areas exposed to climate change effects, like agriculture, water or forestry, are also more likely to be affected by extreme weather, resulting in an increase of deaths. Countries have also reported rising violence against women and girls after natural disasters.

Men are affected by climate change effects as well, mainly because of the distinction in the job market and the presence of gender norms in society. A study the International Journal of Environmental Research and Public Health shows that men are more often exposed to work and outdoor activities in temperatures above 27 degrees Celsius. However, heat-related mortality rates vary among studies, indicating that it varies based on the region. Additionally, the same study found that men have a higher risk of death from accidents and injuries related to climate change. An estimated 1605 excess deaths per year could be caused by a 1.5-degree warming of the planet and 84% of these deaths are projected to be male.

==== Sexual abuse and disease transmission ====
Sexual abuse is any form of unwanted sexual contact, ranging from verbal to physical. It can range from sexual harassment or inappropriate touching to rape or attempted rape. It can occur between two people of any gender, but is most commonly perpetrated by males against females. It can occur in any setting, but is most often within a relationship or family. Disease transmission is the spread of disease-causing organisms from one person to another. This can happen through direct contact with an infected person, or through indirect contact with items such as clothing, bedding or toys that have been contaminated with the infectious agents. Sexual contact is one of the most common ways for disease to be spread, and includes unprotected sex, sexual assault, and intimate contact between partners. The most common diseases that are spread through sexual contact include HIV, syphilis, chlamydia, gonorrhea, and genital herpes. HIV and syphilis can be spread through any form of sexual contact, while chlamydia, gonorrhea, and herpes are mainly spread through unprotected vaginal or anal intercourse. Other sexually transmitted infections, such as hepatitis B, can also be spread through sexual contact.

Natural disasters disrupt daily routines and complicate gender and family roles, which can cause victims of natural disasters to feel powerless and frustrated. These feelings often result in aggression against less powerful groups. Women and children in developed and developing countries are at higher risk of sexual abuse during and after natural disasters than before. Cases of child marriage and sex trafficking have risen in some areas of the Indian Sundarban delta after the devastating effects of Cyclone Amphan and ongoing stress caused by COVID-19, impacting the lives of young girls. Condom use during disasters is also lower than at other times, because of decreased access to condoms. Combined with the accelerated spread of diseases and infections in developing countries, the breakdown of the social order and the malnourishment that sometimes accompanies climate change have led to higher rates of dengue fever, malaria, HIV, and STI transmission, especially for women. Elderly women are also particularly at risk during natural disasters and times of crisis because they are more susceptible to climatically induced health risks like disease and because they are often isolated from social support to which men and some younger women have access.

=== Agriculture ===
Agriculture is the science, art, and practice of cultivating plants and livestock. It includes the preparation of soil for growing crops, planting, harvesting, and storing food, and the breeding and raising of livestock. Agriculture also involves the production of commodities such as milk, eggs, and meat, as well as the production of fibers such as cotton and wool. Agriculture is an important part of the global economy and is essential for providing food, feed, and fiber. It is also an important part of rural life and culture, providing employment and a source of income for many people in rural areas. In addition to providing food, feed, and fiber, agriculture also plays an important role in environmental conservation, providing habitat for wildlife and helping to maintain biodiversity.

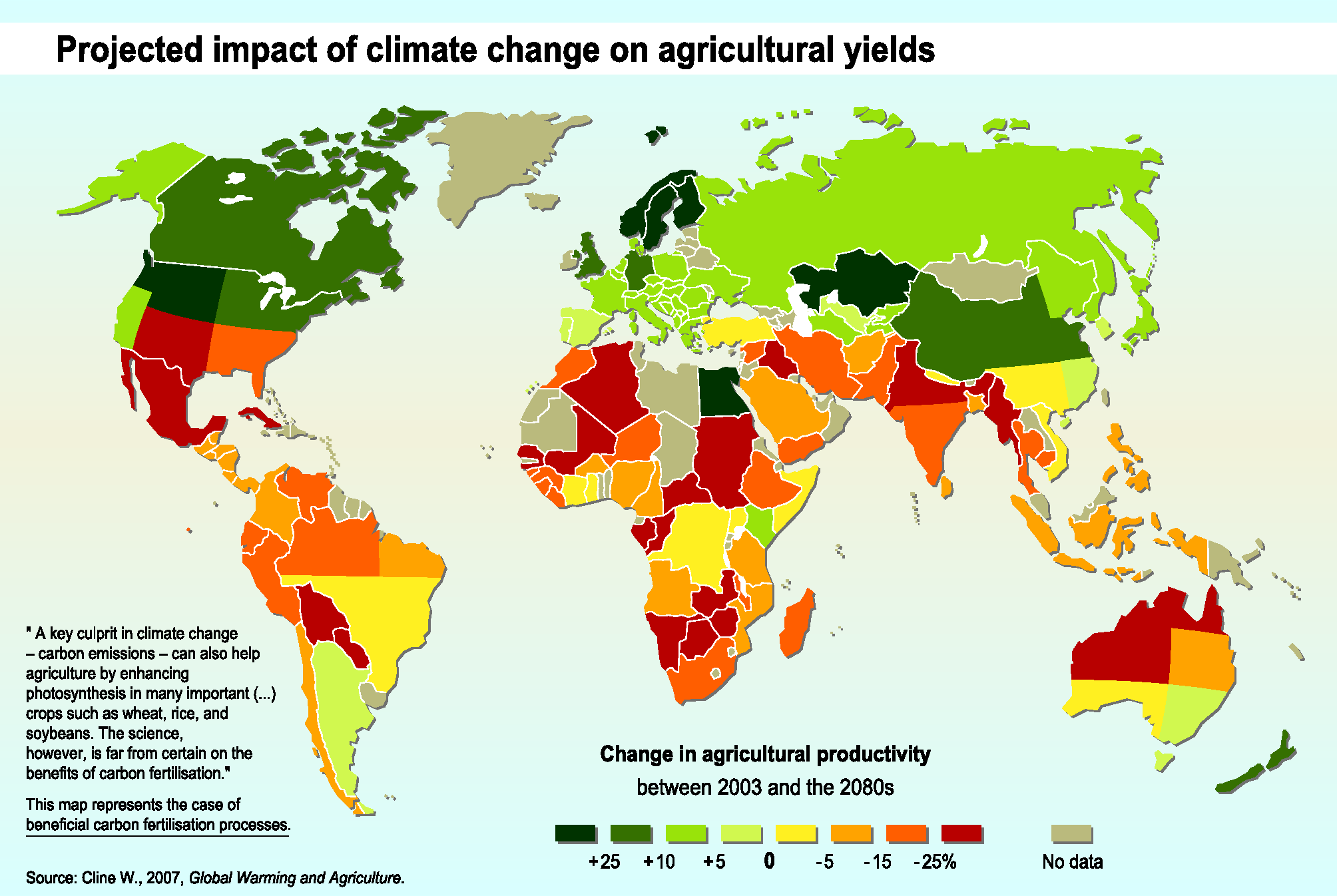
Projected impact of climate change on agricultural yields by the 2080s, compared to 2003 levels (Cline, 2007)

The poor and impoverished are dependent on the environment and its natural resources for subsistence and income; poverty research reveals that many of the poor are women because, as a group, they have less social power. Many women in developing countries are farmers, but women as a group have trouble obtaining education, income, land, livestock, and technology, meaning climate change may negatively impact female farmers more than male farmers by further limiting their resources. In 2009, women produced between 60 and 80 percent of all food in the developing world, yet they owned ten percent of all agricultural land and approximately two percent of land rights.

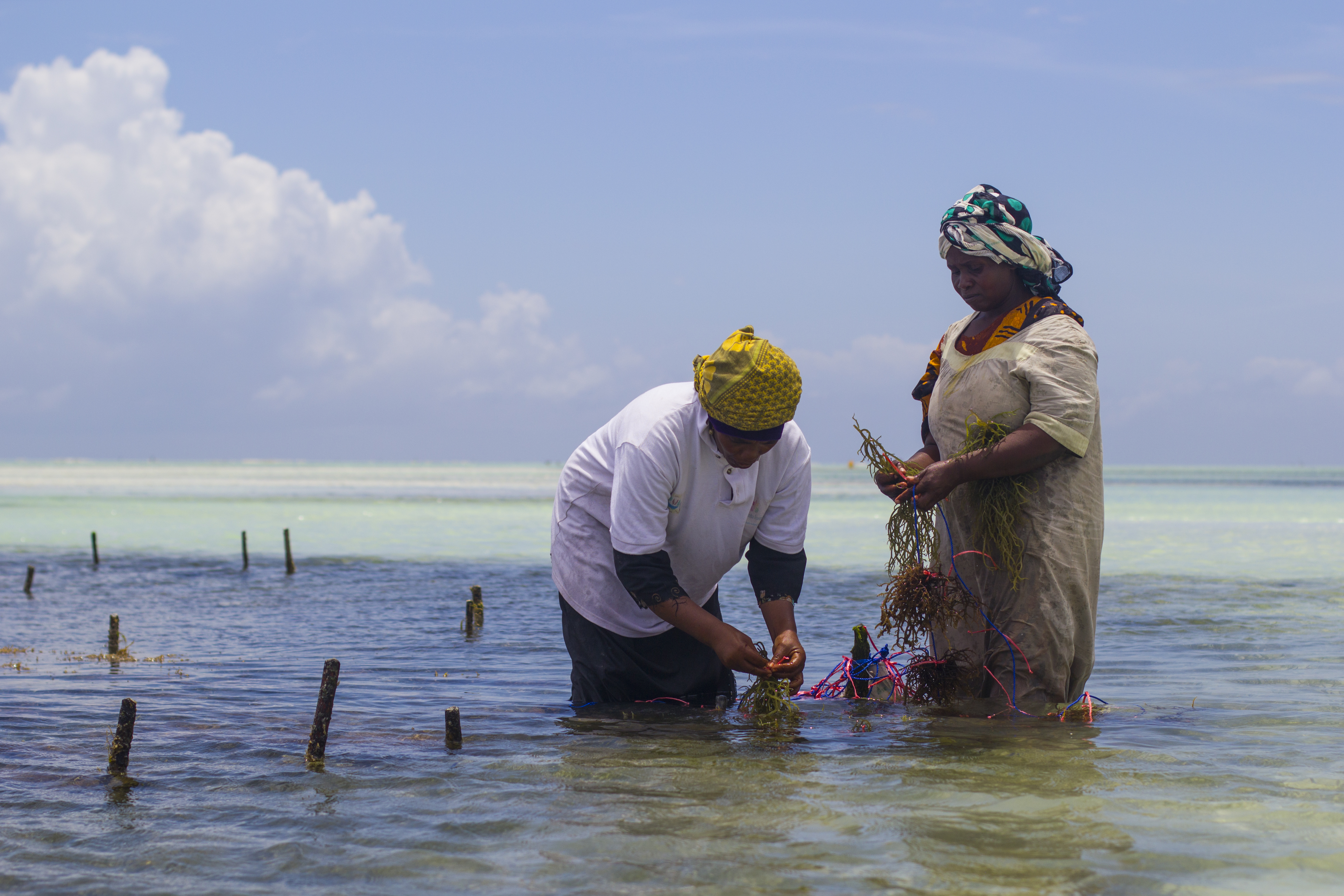
Mwanaisha Makame and Mashavu Rum, who have been farming seaweed on beautiful Zanzibar island for 20 years, wade through the low tide to their farm. Women represent a significant portion of the agricultural workers effected by climate change

As the planet warms and access to water changes, the crop yields tend to decrease. These effects are not uniform, and they have the largest impact on areas of the world where the economy depends on agriculture and the climate is sensitive to change. In developing countries, women are often in charge of obtaining water, firewood, and other resources for their families, but these resources are directly impacted by climate change, meaning women must travel further and work longer to access them during crisis. Climate change increases burdens placed on women by society and further limits their access to education and employment. A changing climate has adverse impacts on agricultural production and in India's Mahanadi delta, this has forced the male farmers to migrate, leaving behind the responsibility of cultivating the small land-holdings to the women under "increasingly uncertain climatic conditions".

Strong gender norms around roles and access to resources in semi-arid regions often confine women-led businesses to climate-exposed sectors, particularly agriculture, but also limit the options women have to build resilience within their businesses. Despite these limitations and the need to addressing inequalities, women entrepreneurs can harness significant adaptive capacity and take advantage of new opportunities. According to research involving the private sector, businesses that have more women on their boards are more likely to increase energy efficiency, lessen their total environmental effect, and invest in renewable energy sources.

In fact, a UN Food Agriculture Organization report shows that women farmers will be more affected by food insecurity due to climate change. Even though they represent 43% of farmers in developing countries, female farmers find it hard to compete with men farmers. This is due to their responsibility to be more present at home, and their limitations to market credit access. In addition to that, women don't usually invest more money in sectors that might increase agriculture productivity. An FAO dossier on Women and Agriculture reported in 2011 confirms that "The obstacles that confront women farmers mean that they achieve lower yields than their male counterparts... Yet women are as good at farming as men. Solid empirical evidence shows that if women farmers used the same level of resources as men on the land they farm, they would achieve the same yield levels."

=== Increased inequalities ===
Climate change and gender-based inequality go hand in hand. Climate change is a major global problem with far-reaching implications for the world's population, particularly women and girls living in impoverished countries. Women and girls are disproportionately affected by climate change because they are often more dependent on natural resources and lack access to the same services and resources that men do. Climate change can lead to water shortages, food insecurity, and displacement, which can all increase the gender-based inequalities already present in many countries. For example, women are typically responsible for collecting water and firewood and managing the household, so an increase in extreme weather events or a decrease in resources can make these tasks more difficult and time-consuming. This can decrease the amount of time women have to pursue other activities, such as education or employment. Climate change can also increase the risk of violence and exploitation for women in vulnerable situations. Natural disasters can leave women and girls homeless and without access to safety resources, increasing their vulnerability to abuse and exploitation. Overall, climate change has the potential to significantly worsen gender-based inequalities in many parts of the world. It is essential that governments and organizations recognize the effect climate change has on gender equality and take steps to protect and empower women and girls. This may include providing access to resources, education, and support services, as well as developing gender-sensitive policies and programs to address the effects of climate change.

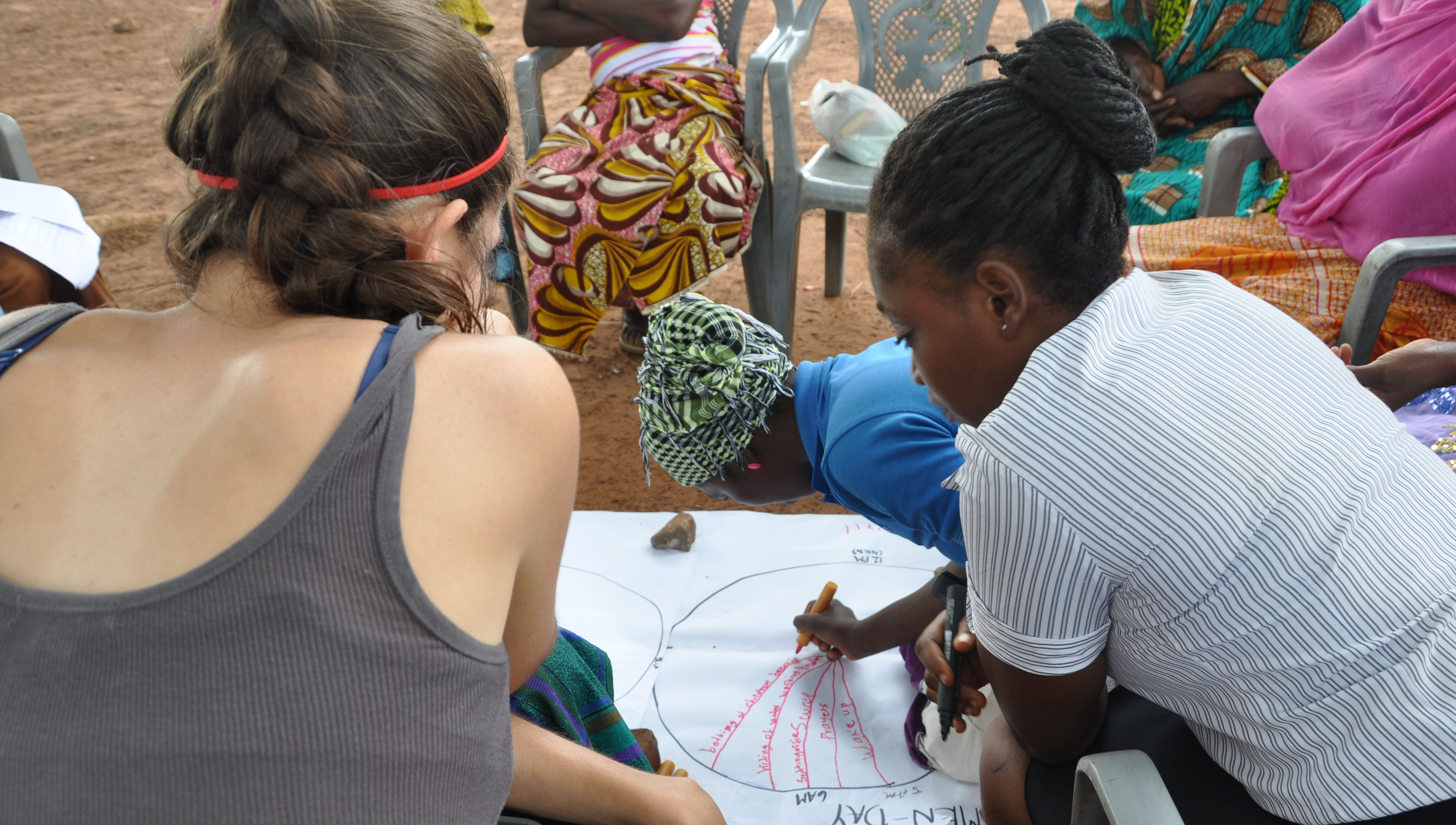
Ghanaian women participating in a research program on gender and social information of farmers and their experiences with climate change

The IPCC Fifth Assessment Report concludes that there is 'robust evidence' for an increase of gender inequalities as a result of weather events as well as for the perpetuation of differential vulnerabilities. The increase of inequalities due to climate change can have several reasons. For example, girls often face more serious risks than boys due to unequal distribution of scarce resources within the household. This effect is amplified by climate change induced resource scarcity. Furthermore, climate change often results in an increase of out-migration of men. This leaves women with an increased work-load at home, resulting in a feminization of responsibilities. Climate change is predicted to increase frequency and magnitude of natural hazards such as extreme heat. During and after these hazards especially women are burdened with increased care work for children, the sick and old, adding furthermore to already significant amount of household duties. Women also tend to donate their food in times of food scarcity, leaving them more vulnerable to health, social and psychological damages. Girls are also pulled out of school to help their families deal with natural disasters.

According to a study completed RAND and Vanderbilt University, climate change may "widen pre-existing health disparities in LGBTQ+ communities."* LGBTQ+ communities will have more exposure to environmental disasters and be more susceptible to the negative impacts from climate-related disasters. Additionally, these marginalized communities will not be able to recover from these disasters, as they have fewer resources to turn to for support. There are two reasons why there is a greater likelihood of these communities being exposed to climate disasters: is because of two reasons. One, highly affected areas include a higher population of LGBTQ+ individuals, who are more likely to witness natural disasters such as floods, extreme heat and disease outbreak, and the long term effects of those disasters. Two, there are structural inequalities present which can worsen the effects of climate change. The study mentions data from a U.S census survey, which presents data that LGBTQ+ individuals have higher rates of being displaced from their homes due to environmental disasters than their cisgender or heterosexual counterparts.

=== Energy poverty ===
Energy poverty is defined as lacking access to the affordable sustainable energy service. Geographically, it is unevenly distributed in developing and developed countries. In 2019, there were an estimated 770 million people who have no access to electricity, with approximately 95% distributed in Asia and sub-Saharan Africa.

In developing countries, poor women and girls living in the rural areas are significantly affected by energy poverty, because they are usually responsible for providing the primary energy for households. In developed countries, old women living alone are mostly affected by energy poverty due to the low income and high cost of energy service.

Even though energy access is an important climate change adaptation tool especially for maintaining health (i.e. access to air conditioning, information etc.), a systematic review published in 2019 found that research does not account for these effects onto vulnerable populations like women.

Energy poverty has a disproportionate impact on women. Without access to other energy sources, 13% of the global population is compelled to collect wood for fuel. Out of the population, women and girls contribute to more than 85% of the work involved in gathering wood for fuel.

"Energy poverty occurs when a household must reduce its energy consumption to a degree that negatively impacts the inhabitants' health and wellbeing."* They imply that it is driven by three root causes including a majority of household funds spent on energy, insufficient income and inefficient energy performance of households and their appliances. Energy poverty is a mainly private issue, which is why it largely affects households.

Energy poverty, especially in Africa and South Asia regularly appears in the form of lack of clean and safe fuels, which has led to the "reliance mainly on traditional energy sources such as biomass."

One reason why there is a disproportionate impact of energy poverty on women, especially in developing nations, is that there is a lack of proper education and technical training. This prevents them from participating in the energy field and "entrepreneurial activities."* A 2004 report from the UNDP emphasizes the importance of women and girls in developing countries participating in comprehensive education, including areas focused on math and sciences, engineering, leadership and technical studies.

== Scientific field ==
Climate change and gender are intertwined in multiple ways. First, environmental changes resulting from climate change can disproportionately impact women, depending on their socio-economic status, ethnicity, and geographic location. For example, women in developing countries are more likely to be dependent on natural resources for food security, access to clean water, and fuel for cooking and heating. As climate change causes more extreme weather events and shifts in precipitation patterns, these resources become scarcer, leading to greater food insecurity and poverty among women. Second, women are often underrepresented in the scientific field, making it difficult to take into account the gender-specific impacts of climate change. This is because women are less likely to have access to education, resources, and research opportunities in the sciences, so their perspectives and expertise are not as well represented in the field. Research that does not consider gender-specific impacts of climate change can lead to an inadequate understanding of how climate change affects different populations and can lead to unequal access to resources and services to address climate change impacts. Finally, women are often responsible for caring for household members and managing resources in communities, so they are well-positioned to lead changes to mitigate climate change. However, women are often excluded from decision-making processes that shape climate change policy, so their perspectives and knowledge are not considered in the policy-making process. This can lead to policies that are not tailored to the gender-specific needs of different populations, resulting in unequal access to resources and services to address climate change impacts. Overall, climate change and gender are interconnected in multiple ways, and it is important to recognize the importance of considering the gender-specific impacts of climate change in research and policy-making.

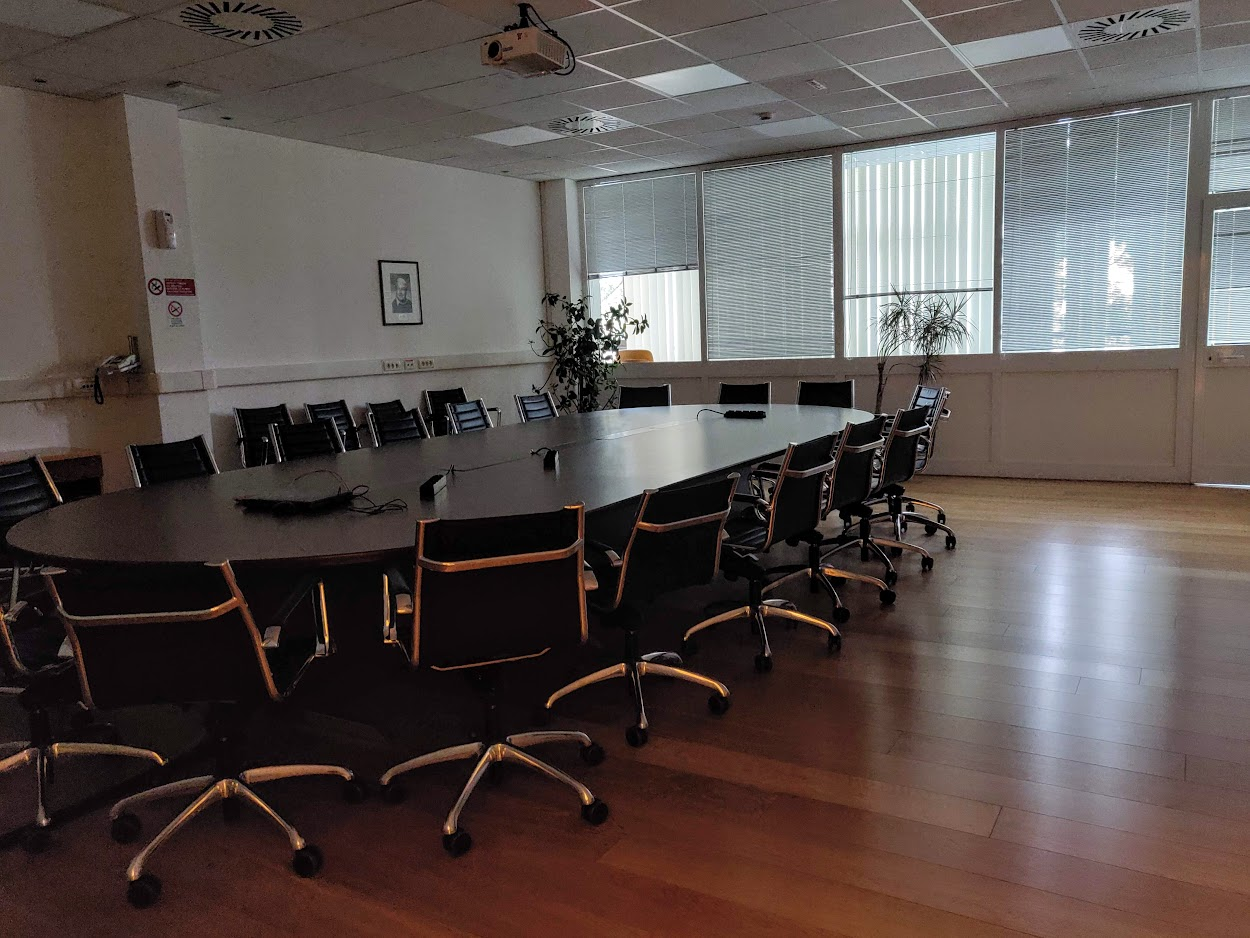
Gender Gap in Science

According to a survey conducted IPCC WGI Co-Chairs and Technical Support Unit (TSU) on 25 April 2014, many of the polled authors stated that they saw the need for a better gender balance. This is reflected in the gender balance of contributors to the fifth IPCC assessment report. Only 27% of contributors to Working Group II, concerned with impacts, adaptation and vulnerability and 18,5% of contributors of Working Group I, concerned with the physical science basis, are female. This also applies to other organisation, as for example only 7% of leadership positions in the offices of National Weather Services are women. On a similar note, a study conducted by the University of Oxford in cooperation with the Nielsen Company found that 18 of the 22 'most influential spokespeople on climate change' are male. Female spokespeople were neither politicians nor scientists and their direct connection to climate change is therefore doubtful.

== Policies ==
Mitigation policy attempts to moderate the intensity of global warming's effects through measures like reducing greenhouse gases and enhancing sinks. According to research, men and women use their knowledge of their environments to mitigate disasters, transferring this knowledge through informal education. Some of this knowledge includes food preservation processes, methods of construction, and understanding of natural resources in the area. Examples of mitigation efforts include carbon emissions trading. Mitigation efforts largely ignore gender.

Adaptive policy involves spontaneous or planned efforts to tolerate the negative effects of climate change and take advantage of the beneficial effects. Men and women respond differently to climate change and subsequently also to adaptation measures, which can affect men and women unequally, when the gender perspective is ignored in the policy. For example, the IPCC report AR5 points out that adaptation measures in agriculture can in some cases lead to increased gender inequalities.

=== Most effective approaches for gender-sensitive policies ===
Some scholars recommend incorporating gender dimensions into research and using human-rights approaches like the Millennium Development Goals and CEDAW as frameworks for climate change responses. Several organizations believe that linking mitigation and adaptation approaches, equally funding both types of efforts, and integrating gender into mitigative and adaptive policies will better address the consequences of climate change. The UNDP mandates gender mainstreaming in all adaptation measures, meaning adaptive responses to climate change must consider gender and gender equality from their inception and cannot incorporate a gender component late in their development or only in certain areas. Others believe that imposing mainstreaming agendas on communities can make gender-sensitive policy less effective and may even be counter-productive, emphasizing gender differences and isolating gender issues from other areas affected by climate change.

=== Gender-blind mitigation policy ===
In 2009, a forest-protection mechanism called Reducing Emissions from Deforestation and Forest Degradation (REDD) was agreed upon by attendees of the United Nations Conference on Environment and Development. Many development organizations praise the REDD mechanism, but others criticize its function as a market-based instrument and its impact on local communities.

Over the past 13 years, they have partnered with 65 countries to meet their forest goals. Some examples of this include: UN-REDD partnered countries have submitted 700 million tCO2 of forest emission reductions, and 25 UN-REDD countries have integrated REDD+ policies at the ministerial or cabinet level, meaning these countries have now seen reductions in deforestation. Their 2020 Executive Summary notes that Myanmar and Peru created strategic policies for the reduction of emissions in the forest and land-use sector.

The UN-REDD program has created a plan for 2021–2025 to reduce forest emissions and enhance carbon stocks. The first priority is to have forest solutions realized, in which they focus on reducing CO_{2} emissions. The second priority is to reward these forest solutions, and they have allocated $5 billion from Results-based Payment schemes, carbon markets, and private-sector carbon investments. Additionally, transactions under the 6th Article of the Paris Agreement are included in this. The third priority of this plan is to have at least 15 countries alter their Nationally Determined Contributions by 2025 to include more about forests, particularly with the goal of lowering emissions. The fourth goal involves REDD+ leading a Nature-based Solutions movement to speed up changes around climate action.

=== Gender-blind adaptation policy ===
Some scholars believe that climate change policy that does not address gender is not effective. Much of the climate change policy created before the 21st century focused on economic rather than social effects of climatic change and global warming. Climate change research and policy began to look at gender in the 21st century. The Convention on the Elimination of All Forms of Discrimination Against Women (CEDAW), the Millennium Development Goals, and the Beijing Platform for Action are all gender-aware initiatives that may affect climate change policy. Some of the international responses to climate change that do not address gender or employ gender-sensitive approaches include Agenda 21, the Rio Declaration on the Environment and Development, the Kyoto Protocol and the Bali Action Plan.

The Convention on Biological Diversity (CBD) and the United Nations Framework Convention on Climate Change have incorporated gender dimensions, the latter through a Gender Action Plan. Roehr notes that, while the United Nations officially committed to gender mainstreaming, in practice gender equality is not reached in the context of climate change. Little data and research results in insufficient gender awareness in enacted gender policies.

Indian state of Odisha's Climate Change Action Plan for 2018–2023 has an entire chapter dedicated to gender and climate change, which outlines a gender-sensitive approach of "empowering women as agents of change and not victims". This is a refreshing change from the earlier Climate Change Action Plan 2010–2015 where gender in the context of climate change has not been fully explored and is thus not included in the government's own Progress Report on the Implementation of the Climate Change Action Plan. This indicates "an exclusion of women's voices from decision-making and financial processes" and further removing them from the policies which have direct impact on their lives.

The five priority areas of the Gender Action Plan include: capacity building, knowledge management and communication, gender balance, participation in women's leadership, coherence, gender-responsive implementation and means of implementation, and monitoring and reporting. Capacity building, knowledge management and communication requires gender consideration to play a larger role when creating policy and action plans. The goal of this is to not only make sure the genders are considered equally, but to increase outreach and awareness to do so. The second part, gender balance, participation and women's leadership, explains a goal of having more women participate in UNFCCC process. The next, which is coherence, emphasizes the need for gender-related mandates. Gender-responsive implementation and means of implementation is ensuring the importance of having women mentioned in legislation such as the Paris Agreement. And finally, the monitoring and reporting would monitor these changes under the Lima work program to see whether or not the gender action plan is being implemented properly.

=== Including women in policy-making processes ===
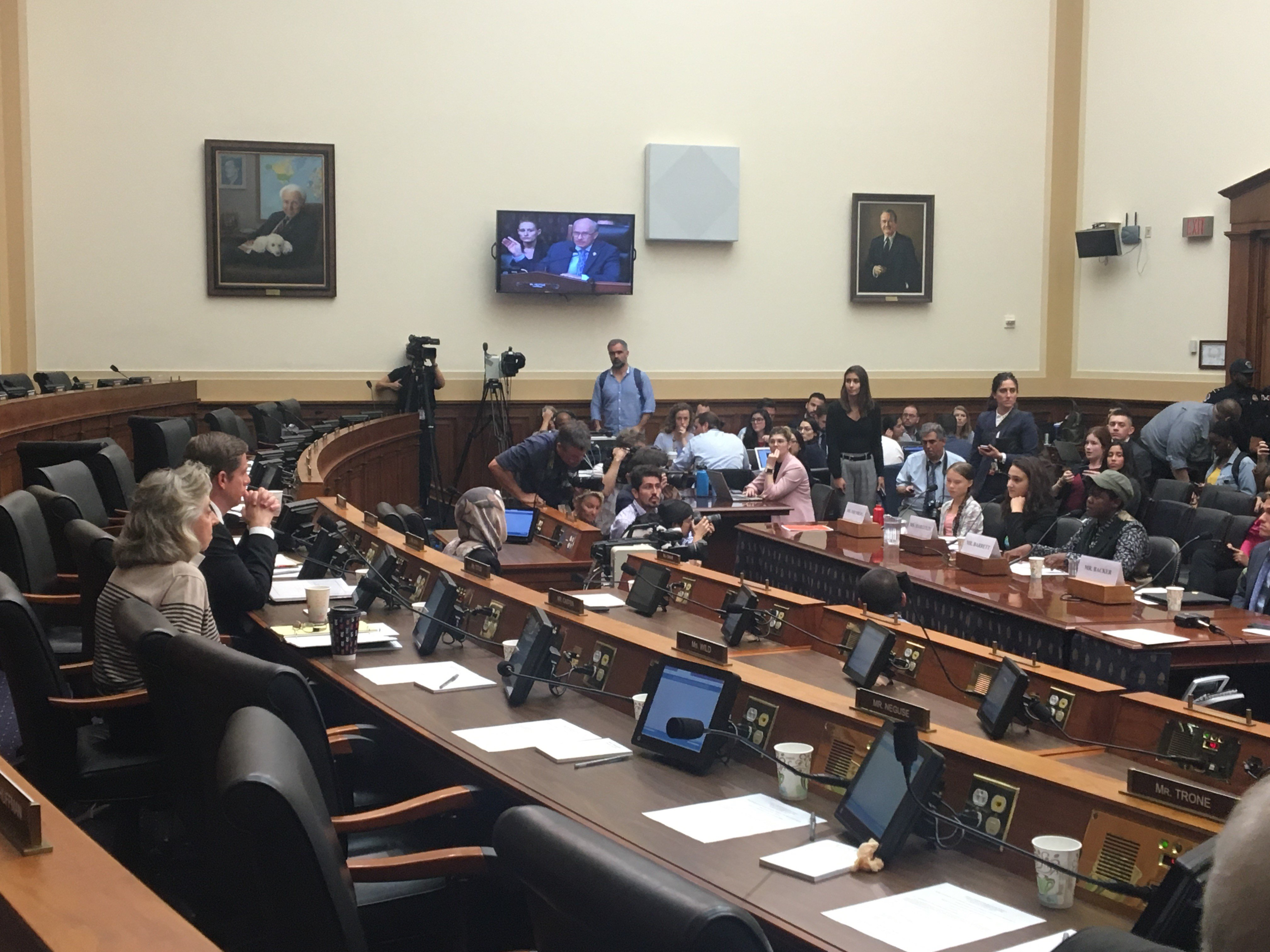
Dina Titus listening to Greta Thunberg discussing the urgent need to address climate change.

Gender inequalities do not only emerge in context of climate change as a physical reality, but also within discourses of and negotiations over climate change. This is reflected in the fact that men are dominant in all levels of climate change debate – from the science to policy, from the local to the global level. This has an effect on climate change policies.

Women can be important players in climate change policy because they have gendered knowledge about things like managing water resources. While women in rural areas depend on the environment heavily, they are not usually represented in climate change decision-making processes. CARE's research shows that, when women are in control of the family income, it is more likely to be spent on human development. Women are also generally more risk averse than men and make safer decisions. Yet, in 2008, the EU Commission and Council on adaptation policy did not address gender at all. Furthermore, gender roles and subsequent institutional and social pressures can pose constraints to adaptive capacities. Most scholars and organizations working to address climate change agree that policy-makers must work with both women and men and take them into consideration at all levels.

Research supports the role women play in leading climate action: nations with more female parliamentary representation are more likely to ratify environmental accords and pass laws that deal with the implications of climate change.

=== Patriarchy and climate change science and policy ===
Some feminist scholars hold that the debate on climate change is not only dominated by men but also primarily shaped in 'masculine' principles, which limits discussions about climate change to a perspective that focuses on technical solutions, and accounts for the inability to adapt to and mitigate climate change points out the impact of spatial practices that manifest power relations and marginalise women. The often-hidden subjectivity and power relations that actually condition climate change policy and science, lead to a phenomenon which Tuana terms 'epistemic injustice'.

Similarly, MacGregor criticizes the scientific discourse from a less quantitative perspective but focusses on discursive aspects. She attests that by framing climate change as an issue of 'hard' natural scientific conduct and natural security, it is kept within the traditional domains of hegemonic masculinity. Seager maintains that the 2 °C aim, which is a reoccurring topic in the climate change debate, is not, as often assumed, a safe goal for all people on the planet. Rather it will ensure the stability of a patriarchal capitalism and subsequently the continuity of power for those who are powerful today.

== Individual action by Individuals Varying in Gender ==
Women can play a role in climate change response and can often help at the local level, which can inform specific aspects of climate change policy. Women contribute their local knowledge of leadership, sustainable resource management, and how to incorporate sustainability into both the household and community. This also demonstrates how women play a vital role in natural resource management.

Additionally, evidence demonstrates communities are better prepared for natural disasters when women play a pivotal role in the early warning systems and reconstructions. A 2000 study in South Asia demonstrated that women were crucial in hazard preparation and rebuilding/managing communities after a disaster, as well as ensuring food security and safety for specific groups of people.

== Gender inclusivity ==
=== Sexual and gender minorities ===
Many marginalized groups are disproportionately affected by the climate crisis the world is experiencing, and this includes both gender and sexual minorities. Following a disaster, same sex couples risk not receiving relief support if they are not recognized as a legitimate couple by the government. Additionally, non-binary individuals lack access to gender-specific services that target men or women. Initiatives to reduce this risk and danger include MapBeks to map LGBTQ+ safe spaces, HIV testing facilities, and access through roads and buildings for disaster management.

=== Men and Climate Change ===
Climate change worsens, male-specific environmental issues worsen. Differential vulnerability examines the relationship between environmental stressors and the effects they have on certain groups compared to others. For example, one stressor that affects men disproportionately is the societal notion of masculinity. This can cause men and boys to take risks, especially during times of turmoil, such as environmental disasters. This explains the statistic that men's mortality is highest during an event, such as a hurricane or flood. Additionally, another social norm, especially in developing nations, is that men should be hesitant to seek help and change habits, preventing vulnerability. This causes some men to resist adaptation, causing them to be less successful in their survival methods, especially during environmental catastrophes.

Additionally, gender-specific jobs for men and the way tasks are completed are at stake due to climate change. For example, certain agricultural activities such as fishing and farming may become impossible due to rising sea levels and the rising carbon levels effect on the soil. This could potentially cause men to abandon their agricultural jobs and threaten their ability to make a livable income. Men also may not have access to accurate information regarding topics like the availability of drinking water and what crops can be used for cooking, due to social barriers. The limited information men may have about these pieces of information can cause a lack of adequate planning and less successful plans for the community at stake.

=== US policy and strategy ===
In recent years, initiatives toward gender equality in relation to climate change have been created. One of these initiatives is the National Strategy on Gender Equity and Equality, which was proposed by the Biden-Harris administration. This is a strategy that aims to have full participation of all people, which includes women, in the United States. In this Strategy, they recognize that there is gender-based discrimination and exclusion in the development of climate policy. These policies, which are exclusionary, make it difficult to make effective policy about issues such as climate change if groups of people are being left out. The goal of this strategy is to promote gender equity in relation to climate change policy and mitigation, as well as address how climate change might affect public health differently based on gender.

This goal of promoting gender equity in mitigating and responding to climate change involves multiple steps. The first is to pursue this gender parity in both negotiations and science that center around climate change. To promote the education of women, the administration hopes to create a focus on climate science in education and ensure their inclusion in the environmental protection plans and climate action plans. The next priority is to create more leadership trainings for women to create better participation in clean energy economy. Another goal is to utilize the Justice40 Initiative to deliver 40% of benefits from investments for climate and clean energy to disadvantaged communities. Additionally, they plan to create a Climate and Economic Justice Screening Tool.

Other legislation, such as the Women and Climate Change Act of 2019. hopes to highlight initiatives led by women to not only combat climate change itself, but the gender inequality that exists within this area. They hope to establish the Federal Interagency Working Group on Women and Climate Change, and to create a more comprehensive strategy on how to involve women in climate policy in the future.

In early 2021, congresswoman Barbara Lee, from the 12th district of California, introduced the Women and Climate Change Act of 2021 and the Resolution Supporting the Teaching of Climate Change in Schools. These two bills were "aimed at mitigating the impact of climate change on women and girls around the world and encouraging the federal government, states, schools, and community organizations to teach climate change in appropriate programs and activities."* Before Lee proposed these bills, there was a Womens and Climate Change Act of 2019, which was aimed at improving the United States government response and strategy to the disproportionate affects climate change has on women and girls. The WCCA of 2019 was supported and endorsed by Planned Parenthood, the Sierra Club and the Women's Environment and Development Organization.

=== Case studies ===
==== Bangladesh ====
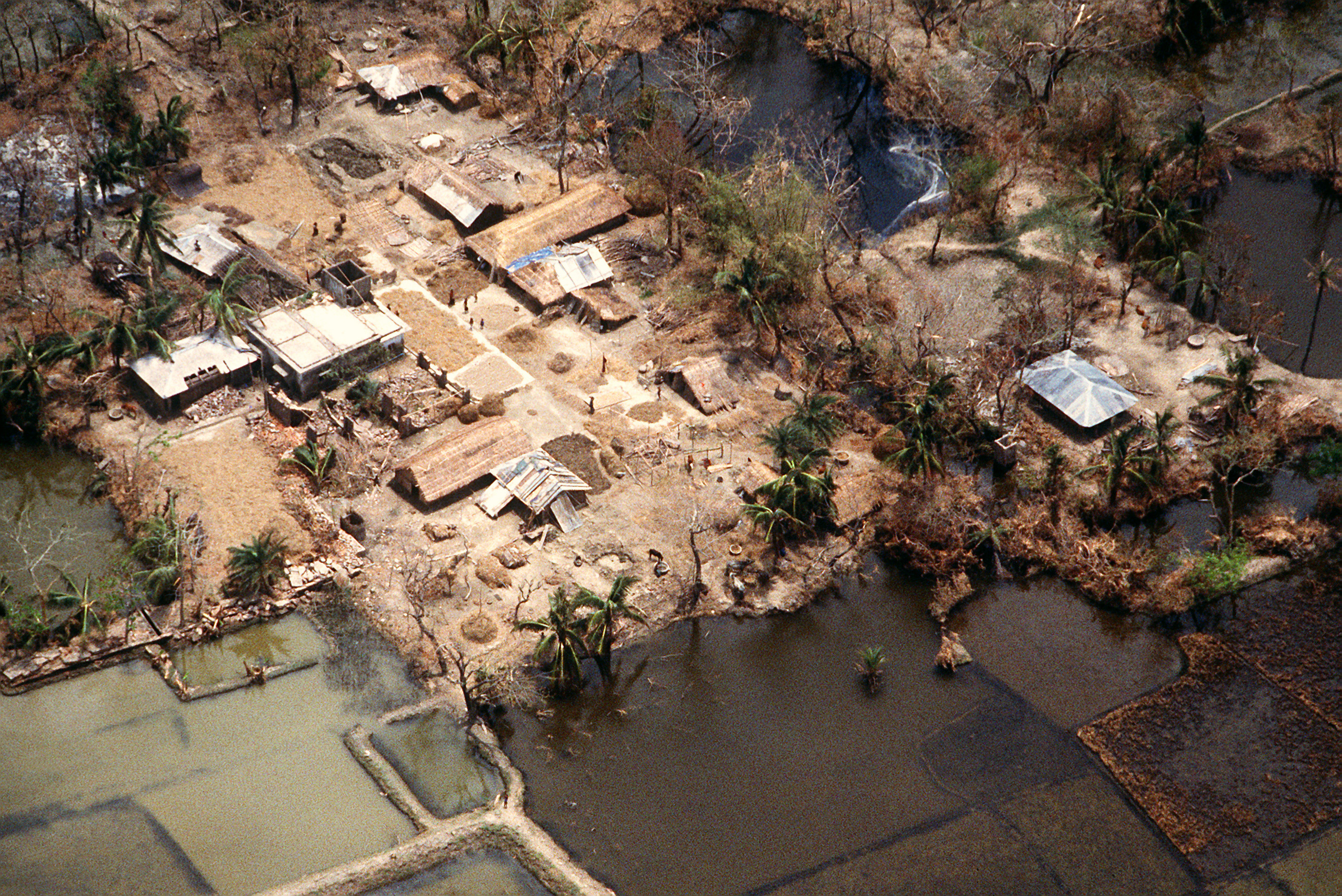
Flooded village after 1991 cyclone

In 2012, it was labeled a Least Developed Country by the United Nations, with high rates of poverty and weak government, meaning it is especially vulnerable to natural disasters. It is densely populated and about 63 percent of its population was working in the agriculture, forestry, or fishing sectors in 2010. Slightly less than half of Bangladesh's population is women and, in 2001, 80 percent of women lived in rural areas. Bangladeshi women are particularly vulnerable to climate change because they have limited mobility and power in society. Research shows that, after the cyclone and flooding of 1991, Bangladeshi women aged 20–44 had a much higher death rate than men of the same age: 71 per 1000, compared to 15 per 1000 for men. Even if a cyclone warning is issued, many women die because they must wait at home for their relatives to return before they can seek shelter.

As climate change progresses, access to and salinization of water sources are becoming problems in Bangladesh. When there is a lack of drinking water, women are responsible for procuring it regardless of the distance they must travel or the terrain they must cover. During natural disasters, male unemployment rises. When men become unemployed, women's responsibilities increase because they must secure and manage income and resources on top of feeding the family and caring for children and the elderly. As the number of men at home without income or occupation rises, more women report mental and physical abuse by their male relatives. To cope with climatic change, women store matches, food for the family, fodder for the livestock, medicine, and fuel sources in safe places in case of disaster. They also teach their children skills such as swimming to prepare them for crisis. The global relief agency CARE believes that climate-resilient jobs such as duck rearing can help increase Bangladeshi women's resilience to climate change.

==== Madagascar ====
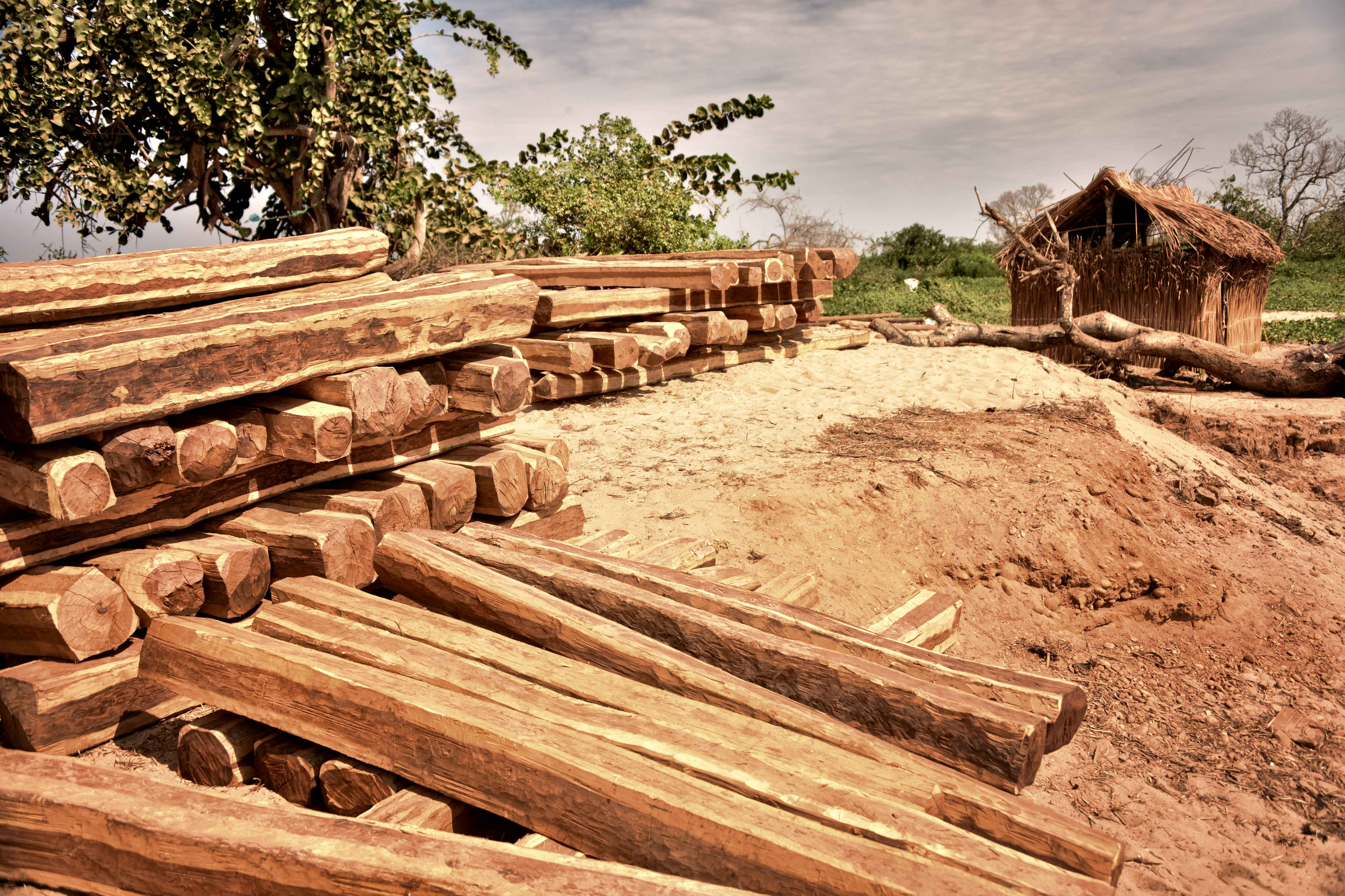
Deforestation in Madagascar.

80% of species of plants and animals found in Madagascar are not available anywhere else on Earth. Due to this exceptional uniqueness of the species, deforestation in Madagascar will have serious impact on the global biodiversity, and this arguably makes the country the highest priority for world's biodiversity conservation. Climate change effects in Madagascar, a country with a predominantly rural and vulnerable population, is expected to exacerbate the occurrences of powerful cyclones, flooding, droughts, and unpredictability in climate patterns, which will further threaten food security, infrastructures, and the ecosystem of the country. The Policy Research Brief published by International Policy Centre for Inclusive Growth (IPC-IG) titled "Greening the Economy and Increasing Economic Equity for Women Farmers in Madagascar" identifies that the lived realities of climate change in Madagascar are distinctly gender-differentiated. The relevant national policies and strategies such as Madagascar's National Adaptation Program of Action (NAPA) related to climate change have not been gender focused, hence, resulting to vital gender related policy gap that tends to further reinforce women marginalization in policy processes relating to climate adaptation, funding and mitigation. The report recommended organization of women's cooperatives and improved inclusion of women in leadership role to improve social inclusivity in the green economy.

==== Mozambique ====
The government of Mozambique adopted a Gender, Environment and Climate Change Strategy and Action Plan in early 2010, being the first government in the world to do so. In its phase II action plan, Alcinda António de Abreu, Mozambique's then Minister of Environment, comments that "climate change adaptation and mitigation [rely] upon the sustainable use and equitable control of, as well as benefits derived from, natural resources – and all citizens, regardless of their social status or their gender, in all spheres of economic and political life, have a role to play in this critical effort". Sustainable use and management of natural resources training have been provided to over 12,000 women. Similarly, thirty-six communities have learned and gained knowledge about more effective methods for prevention and control of fires, plantation of drought resistant crops, and production and usage of improved stoves.

==== South Africa ====
In 2010, South Africa was the region with the largest economy in Africa, yet more than half of the population lived in poverty and many were unemployed. Impoverished populations of South Africa depend heavily on agriculture and natural resources to live. Coal and metal ore mining were also significant contributing sectors of the economy, but are decreasing in the 21st century due to climate change and globalization. In 2007, the Intergovernmental Panel on Climate Change (IPCC) predicted that Africa would warm due to climate change 1.5 times more than the rest of the world and that South Africa, specifically, would be 3 – 4 °C warmer by 2100. Water, agriculture, mining, and forestry would all be affected by these changes in temperature and weather. The Human Sciences Research Council found in 2004 that 57% of South Africa's poor were at risk for negative climate change effects because they depended on rain-fed agriculture and climate change in Africa was expected to cause longer and more intense periods of drought over time. Many of the rural poor in South Africa are women who have only limited access to property, income, credit, resources, and social power.

In South Africa, men traditionally look after the livestock while women look over the garden, but in extended periods of drought, many households lose their livestock. In response to this loss and to increasing unemployment, men are turning to alcohol to deal with the psychological stress. Some are also increasing their number of sexual partners, increasing their risk of contracting or spreading HIV. In response to these changes, more women are entering the workforce, either formally or informally. Some are now working in traditionally male occupations like mining and construction. Others are making and selling goods locally. Social grants from the South African government further support households affected by the changing climate. These grants include pensions, disability payments, and child support. In some cases, when men are responsible for the distribution of social grants in the household instead of women, they use the money to purchase alcohol. In response, the government tends to give grant money to women, which can cause domestic disputes within households.

Understanding of climate change in South Africa is based mainly on experience and local knowledge, which is communicated orally. Women tend to hold more of this knowledge than men do because of their experience with farming and gardening. In response to drought, some women plant crops near wetlands or other water sources. They also preserve food for periods of drought or crop failure. Despite their knowledge of climate change, many responses in South Africa (like the South African Country Study on Climate Change Vulnerability & Adaptation Assessment) do not address gender. While women in South Africa are represented in the government at national and provincial level, there are not many women in government at a municipal level.

==== North America ====
On August 29, 2005, a category 3 hurricane, Hurricane Katrina, hit the Gulf Coast of the United States, leaving an impact on everyone who survived. The infamous natural disaster did, however, leave an even more dramatic influence on the women living in New Orleans at the time. According to Laura Butterbaugh, author of Feminism and Motherhood, at the time the hurricane struck, 25.9% of women living in New Orleans were living below the poverty line, almost 6% more than men living in the same radius. Due to their financial situation, women were put in positions where they were not able to evacuate their homes after floods had commenced. This posed an even greater problem for women who were pregnant and with children, as their mobility was restricted. Around 56% of women in New Orleans are single mother-headed households, so poverty-stricken single-mother families and historical flooding lead to disaster. Women also faced a higher risk of violence during the disaster and years following it. According to Jane Henrici, Allison Suppan Helmuth, and Jackie Braun from the Institute for Womens Policy Research,, during the span of the hurricane gender-based violence "in Mississippi rose from 4.6 per 100,000 per day when Hurricane Katrina hit the state, to 16.3 per 100,000 per day a year later while many women remained displaced from their homes and were living in temporary shelters and trailers."* In the future, it is critical for communities prone to natural disasters to make a plan about how they will protect marginalized communities during times of environmental catastrophe. Finally, additional research should be done examining the effects of natural disasters on all gender identities, to better understand how each community should be supported.

==== South America ====
Abraham Granados Martinez suggests women in regions all over Latin America have been forced to adapt to their environments, which are constantly being changed by anthropogenic climate change. In Latin America, Indigenous women are disproportionately affected by climate change, as 58 million women live in rural areas of the continent and 30% of those women own agricultural land. However, a main problem with their adaptation stems from the limited resources they have to deal with droughts, floods, heat waves, sea level rise, and other climate related effects on their communities. Only 5% of the women who live in rural communities and who own agricultural land have access to technical assistance, which leaves them vulnerable to poverty, disease, and violence. These women who live in rural areas are currently finding ways to adapt to this crisis, amid little support from the government. For example, produce-selling women in rural Bolivia are sometimes required to take three forms of transportation to arrive at a destination that will provide them enough funds to provide for their families. Additionally, women in Nicaragua are being forced to rethink how they farm, as climate change is providing for infertile lands.

==== India ====
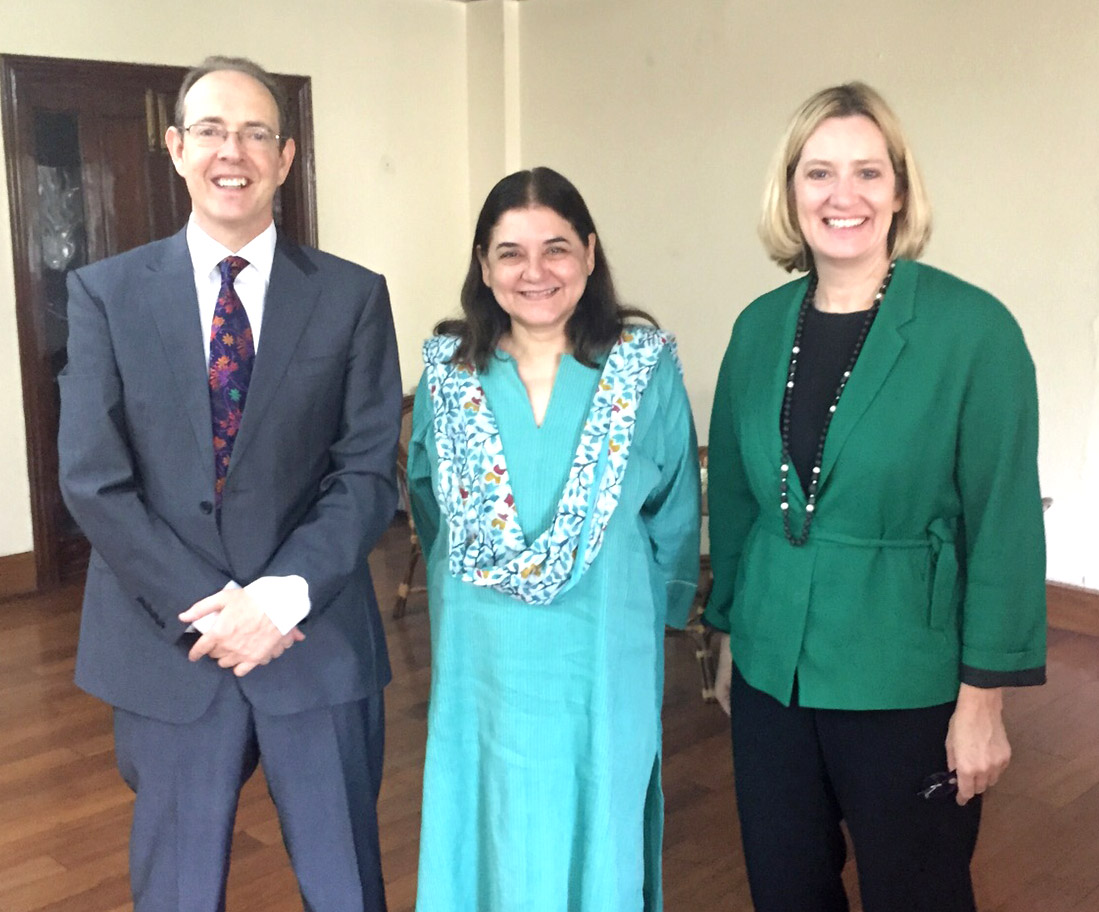
The Secretary of State for Energy and Climate Change, United Kingdom, Ms. Amber Augusta Rudd meeting the Union Minister for Women and Child Development, Smt. Maneka Sanjay Gandhi

To understand gendered vulnerabilities one needs to understand it in conjunction with caste, class, and ethnicity. In India's Mahanadi Delta, women from Scheduled Castes exhibited high levels of self-confidence and self-esteem in spite of facing deprivation. While women from higher castes are bound by "stronger patriarchal control and restricted mobility", women from Scheduled Castes "often without even realizing it" are capable of doing away with patriarchal limitations and "acquire mobility with greater ease".

The perception of women as being "only vulnerable and marginalized in the context of climate change" is incorrect. Women's agency to cultivate vegetables in water logged fields of Totashi village of Odisha has turned the disadvantages caused by water logging on its head by providing them with additional income to support their families and nutritional requirement. Women of Odisha's Jeypore village volunteer twice a month to clear out water hyacinth from the water bodies by forming a chain to "pull floating sections of water hyacinth prior to uprooting them". This has not only improved the water quality of the ponds and enabled villagers to engage in duck farming and fishing but also checked the reduction of soil fertility and spread of diseases, snakes, and poisonous insects.

A study conducted between 2014 and 2018 in five districts of the Mahanadi delta of Odisha show that female-headed households experienced "more monetary losses due to failure of crop, livestock and equipment damages as well as loss of life" as compared to the male headed households during extreme events. The female headed households had the existing responsibilities of looking after the family, and coupled with lower incomes, lower resilience or adaptive capacity, they were worse off than male headed households during extreme events. The inequalities were further compounded by the women's age, marital status, lack of education, and income where a proportion of women had no income, many had low income, and a significant proportion were widows of mature age with no education. Not only were these women living under vulnerable physical conditions in the delta owing to a changing climate but were also socio-economically more vulnerable than the male-headed households.

== Controversies regarding gender and climate change ==
=== "Women as vulnerable" vs "Women as virtuous" ===
There are two concurring themes that emerge when examining climate change and gender: "Women as vulnerable or virtuous in relation to the environment." This means that women living in countries in the global South are more likely to be affected by climate change than men in those countries and that men in the global North are more likely to contribute to climate change than women. These assumptions about women's vulnerability and virtuousness reinforce global north–south biases, which is that women in the global South are poor and helpless and women in the global North are well-educated and pro-environmentalists.

The "women as virtuous" narrative frames women as important drivers in building equal and sustainable responses to climate change. The UNFPA report State of World Population 2009 – Facing a Changing world: Women, Population and Climate identifies women as important actors in mobilizing against climate change. Specifically, Carolyn Sachs discusses the struggles women face on a global scale against environmental factors such as gender arrangements in agricultural development. Often women become oppressed by their corporate counterparts as a more focused point of reference in women's vulnerability. Women labor is exploited as a way to keep them from fighting back in turn, during the mid-year season change they face vast struggles of extreme climate change and availability to natural resources.

== See also ==
- Climate change adaptation
- Climate change and poverty
- Climate justice
- Feminization of poverty
- Women in climate change

== Sources ==
- MacGregor, Sherilyn. "A Stranger Silence Still: The Need for Feminist Social Research on Climate Change." The Sociological Review 57 (2010): 124–140. Web. 25 October 2014.
- Nussbaum, Martha C. Creating Capabilities: The Human Development Approach. Cambridge, MA: Harvard University Press, 2011.
- Olsson, Lennart et al. "Livelihoods and Poverty." Climate Change 2014: Impacts, Adaptation, and Vulnerability. Part A: Global and Sectoral Aspects. Contribution of Working Group II to the Fifth Assessment Report of the Intergovernmental Panel on Climate Change. Ed. C. B. Field et al. Cambridge and New York: Cambridge University Press, 2014. 793–832.
- Schneider, Stephen H., Armin Rosencranz, Michael D. Mastrandrea, and Kristin Kuntz-Duriseti. Climate Change Science and Policy. Washington, DC: Island Press, 2010.
- Tuana, Nancy. "Gendering Climate Knowledge for Justice: Catalyzing a New Research Agenda." Research, Action and Policy: Addressing the Gendered Impacts of Climate Change. Ed. Margaret Alston and Kerri Whittenbury. Dordrecht: Springer Netherlands, 2013. 17–31.
