= International Policy Centre for Inclusive Growth =

The International Policy Centre for Inclusive Growth (IPC-IG), is a partnership between the Poverty Practice of the Bureau for Development Policy, UNDP and the Government of Brazil. Created in 2004 and located in Brasília, IPC-IG is a global forum for South-South dialogue on innovative development policies. The IPC-IG's mission is to promote policy dialogue and facilitate learning between developing countries around social policies for inclusive growth. The IPC-IG’s main national partner is the Government of Brazil through the Brazilian Institute for Applied Economic Research (IPEA), the Secretariat of Strategic Affairs of the Presidency of the Republic (SAE/PR), and the Ministry of Social Development and Fight against Hunger (MDS).

Part of the IPC-IG's mission includes producing evidence-based research on policies, which the Centre provides through several different publications formats, from the popular One Pagers to its flagship magazine Policy in Focus, to the more technical Working Papers and Policy Research Briefs. The IPC-IG's publications are released in English and translated versions are also produced in Spanish, French, Portuguese, Chinese, Arabic, Italian, Turkish and Bahasa (Indonesia). All publications are made available online and free of charge.
