= Disability in Saudi Arabia =

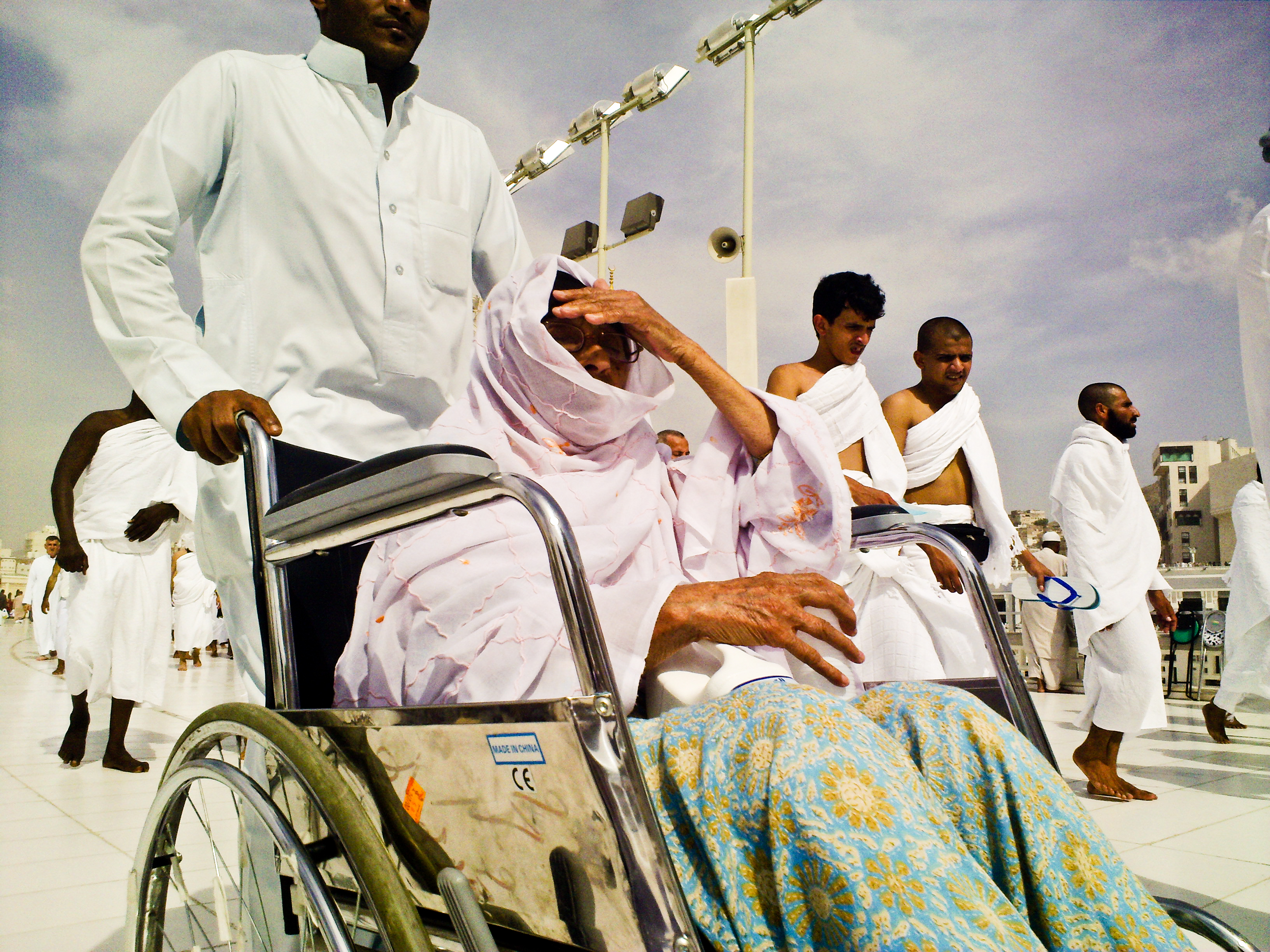
A 2009 Hajj pilgrim in a wheelchair

Disability in Saudi Arabia is seen through the lens of Islamic Sharia, through cultural norms and also through legislation. As an Islamic society that follows the Qur'an and the Sunnah, disability is often seen through the lens of religion. Islam teaches that people with disabilities are to be treated with respect and equality. However, Saudi Arabia tends to view disability through the medical model, rather than the social model. In addition, there are few studies relating to people with disabilities in Saudi Arabia compared to other countries.

Article 27 of the Saudi Basic Law states: " The State shall guarantee the rights of the citizens and their families in cases of emergency, illness, disability and old age. The State shall support the Social Insurance Law and encourage organizations and individuals to participate in philanthropic activities". The National Transformation Program 2020 states that one of the program's 37 goals is to integrate people with disability in the labor market.

== Demographics ==
For many years, it was thought that the rate of disability in Saudi Arabia was low, but it turned out that many families were not integrating people with disabilities into daily life. A 2000 census found that 135,000 Saudi Arabian people have disabilities, with 33.7% of these being physical disabilities. More people with disabilities live in rural areas.

== Causes ==
In 2010, statistics showed the leading cause of disability in Saudi Arabia for men was traffic injuries on the highway, while for women, the leading cause was major depressive disorder. The prevalence of depression in women is between 17 and 46 percent and early diagnosis is critical to both patient outcome and cost of treatment. Younger women are also more likely to intentionally attempt suicide.

Another major cause of disability is close family intermarriage. First cousins marrying in Saudi Arabia is common. There is also a higher risk of congenital disability among parents who are disabled, older mothers and mothers who do not have adequate health care during pregnancy.

== Cultural attitudes towards disability ==
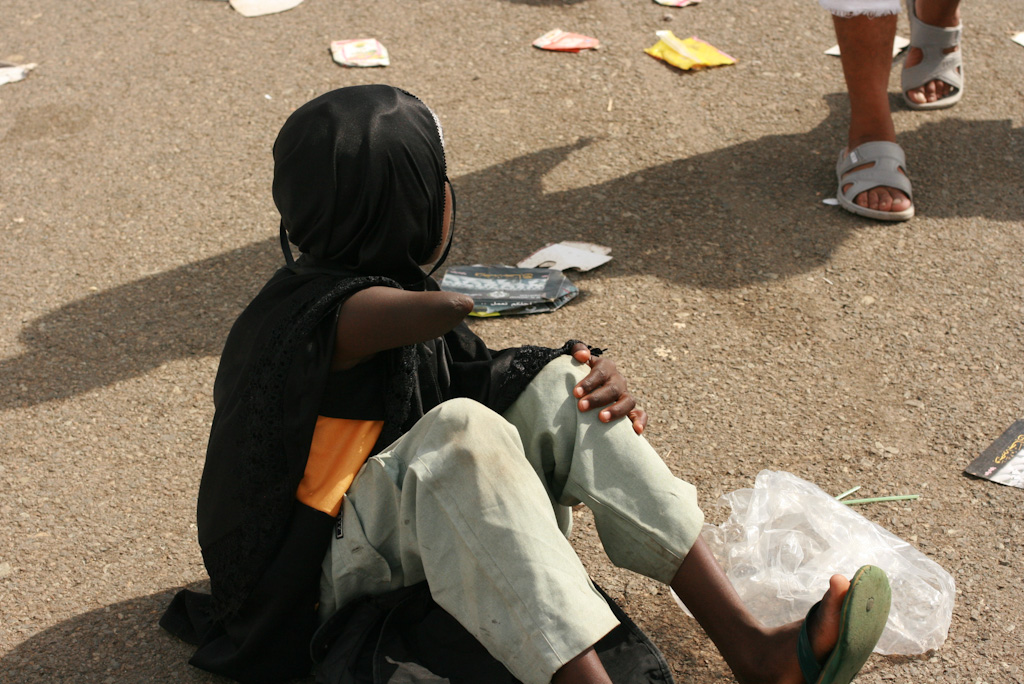
A child with a disability begging for money at Mount Arafat in 2011

In Islamic society, there is an emphasis in respecting the lives of people with disabilities. In general, Islam is against all kinds of discrimination, including discrimination against disability. There are many stories in early Islamic literature such as companions of Muhammad such as Julaybib In society, people with disabilities are often marginalized for various reasons, including lack of education about disabilities in communities and shame for having disability and the poverty that often accompanies disability. Parents of children with disabilities such as autism, often get information about their children's condition from non-medical sources, believing vaccinations or the evil eye caused the autism. Some parents turn to religion to help their children improve.

Among health care professionals, there is an overall positive attitude towards people with disabilities, regardless of gender. It was found that doctors often did not give adequate health information to patients who have Down syndrome. It is still common for people who can afford it to receive medical treatment for disabilities in Western countries.

It is politically correct to refer to people with disabilities as "people with special needs."

== Policy ==
Saudi Arabia bases its laws on Islamic Sharia. Islamic Sharia puts an emphasis on people with disabilities to have the rights "to live with dignity and benefit from welfare." The Royal Family of Saudi Arabia is supportive of both private and public endeavors to help people with disabilities.

The Ministry of Education runs several organizations to help people with disabilities. These include the Noor Institute for the Blind, the Amal Institute for the Deaf and the Institute for the Intellectually Disabled. Other organizations are run by the Ministry of Labor and Social Affairs. The Ministry of Health provides health services to most people in Saudi Arabia.

People with disabilities in Saudi Arabia are entitled to 50% off airfare for themselves and a companion. They have the right to education, equal work and access to public space. People with disabilities are entitled to accessible parking spaces and a subsidy of SR 10,000 to convert cars for specifications relating to their disability. Social security is available to individuals with disabilities or who become disabled later in life.

=== Non-governmental organizations ===
The King Salman Centre for Disability Research, Disabled Children Association and the Joint Centre for Research in Prosthetic and Orthopedics and Rehabilitation Programs are three non-governmental organizations operating in Saudi Arabia to help people with disabilities. Saudi Arabia hosts 44 associations and 347 day-care centers for people with special needs.

There are also connected organisations such as Muslim Disability Awareness which advise the Islamic governments in order they are regulated in occurrence to Islamic tradition.

=== Legislation ===
The rule of Law in Saudi Arabia is the Shariah law. The rights of Muslims with disabilities and the historic account are first found in the start of Islam with examples of Muhammad's companions Ibn Umm Maktūm and Julaybib. The first recognise ruling in Saudi Arabia to protect people with disabilities in Saudi Arabia was created in 1956 with Royal Decree No. 1219. This decree also directs government organizations to coordinate with non-governmental organizations so that services aren't duplicated. It is also concurrent with a major outbreak of polio in the country. In 1969, the labor code was established to define vocational rehabilitation for people with disabilities. The Council of Ministers Resolution No. 407 in 1973 provided a monthly allowance for people with disabilities who "participate at Disabled Training Centers." The next year, the Council of Ministers passed Resolution No. 715 which provided services for various people with disabilities who require medical care. The Decree No. 129 created policy for the General Department of Rehabilitation and created vocational and rehabilitation programs for people with disabilities.

In 1980, under the Council of Ministers Resolution No. 219 allows the General Department of Rehabilitation is to give an annual donation of SR 30,000 to projects for people with disabilities which were created by people with disabilities themselves. The Council of Ministers Resolution No. 187 in 1981 allowed people with disabilities and organizations they run to reprieve a 50% discount on government-owned transportation. In 1987, Legislation of Disability was created. In 1992, the Basic System, Issue No. A/90, article 27 ensures that citizens' rights are upheld in "cases of emergency, disability, or old age by providing social security." In 1997, the Council of Ministers Resolution No. 85 created the Person with Disabilities Services Coordination Committee. The resolution also created plans to raise awareness of disabilities and provided donations to families of people with disabilities. The Council of Ministers Resolution No. 7 of 1999 provides approval to raise donations up to SR 50,000 for rehabilitation programs developed by people with disabilities for training goals.

Later, the Disability Code of 2000 was created. The disability code emphasizes the civil rights of people with disabilities to equally access free and "appropriate medical, psychological, social, educational, and rehabilitation services through public agencies." The only provision of Saudi Arabian law that deal with accessibility is the Saudi Building Code (SBC) of 2007, which states that all buildings must be accessible, but doesn't provide exact determinations of what this needs to entail.

Criticism of legislation for people with disabilities is that since it is most often based on the medical model of disability, it rarely deals with the social consequences that people with disability face in Saudi Arabia. Not dealing with the social aspects of disability means that there is not enough emphasis on integrating people into society. For example, despite the passage of SBC, many people who use wheelchairs face difficulty accessing public spaces in Saudi Arabia.

=== Education ===
The first special education services were provided for blind students who received education in "scientific institutes" in 1958. Prior to 1958, parents were expected to provide assistance to their children with disabilities. Official special education in Saudi Arabia was created in 1962, when the Ministry of Education established the Department of Special Learning. Like most schools in Saudi Arabia, special education classes are also gender segregated and teach Islamic principals. Special education is meant to take place in the least restrictive environment (LRE) and all students have an Individual Educational Program (IEP).

== Unique challenges ==
Accessibility to buildings for those with physical disabilities in Saudi Arabia is lacking. In addition, there are more services and organizations for people with disabilities in urban areas.

Saudi Arabia offers limited mental health services.

Prosthetics must be engineered to help people be able to attend and perform the Muslim Call to Prayer.

=== Gender and disability ===
Women in Saudi Arabia often must use women-only clinics which are often not accessible for individuals with physical or "hidden" disabilities. Women's restrictions in Saudi Arabia limit their ability to access mental health services. Women with disabilities have often been hidden at home so that people are not afraid to marry into their families.

== Sport ==
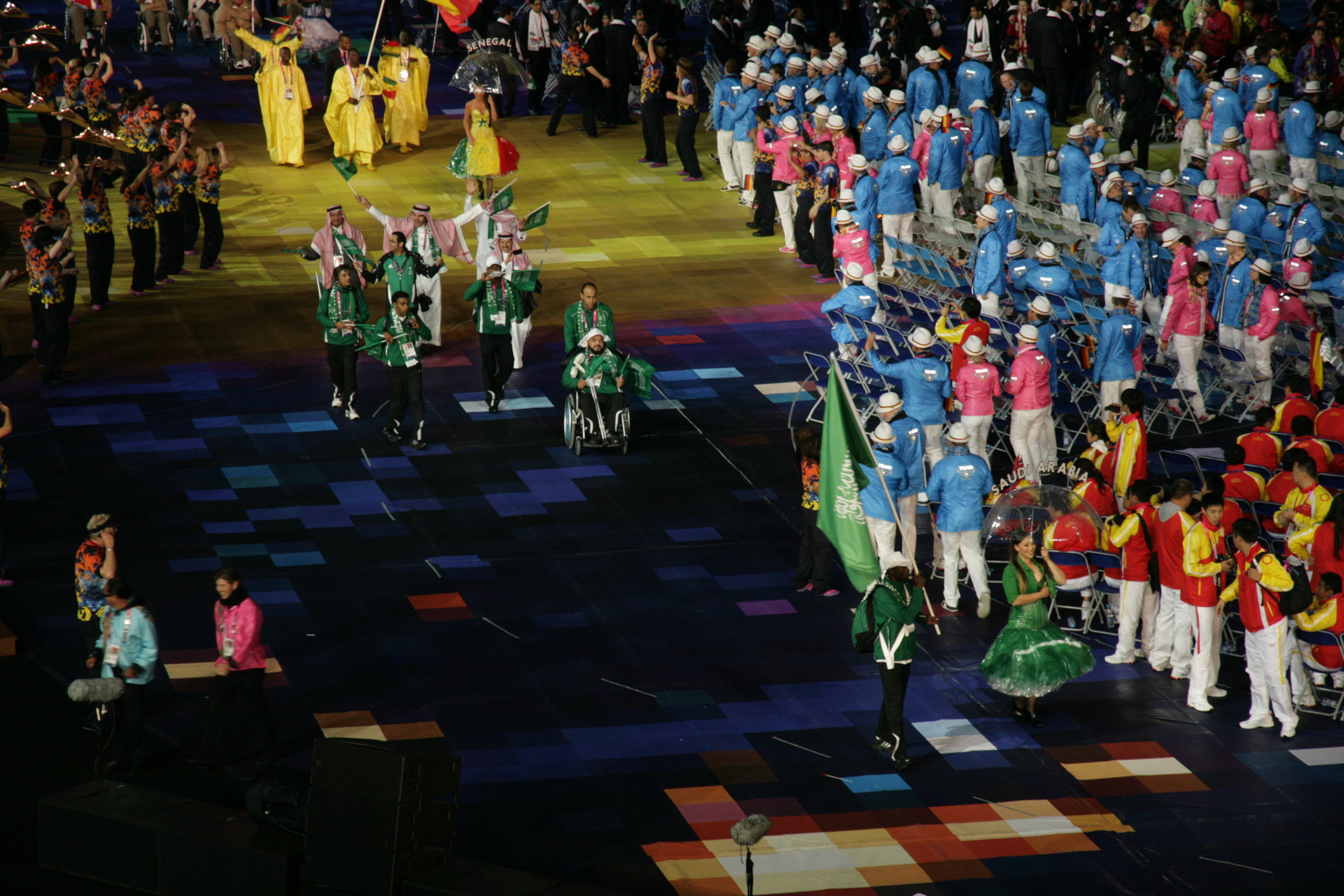
Saudi Arabia Paralympic team at the London 2012 Opening Ceremony

The first paralympic team sent by Saudi Arabia was in 1996, and they competed in Atlanta. Para-athletes have also been involved in the INAS World Football Championship.

== See also ==
- Saudi Arabia
- Health care in Saudi Arabia
- Saudi Commission for Health Specialties
