= SCE =

SCE is an abbreviation with multiple meanings:

== Science ==
- Short-channel effect, a secondary effect describing the reduction in threshold voltage Vth in MOSFETs with non-uniformly doped channel regions as the gate length increases
- Saturated calomel electrode, a commonly used reference electrode used in pH measurement and general aqueous electrochemistry
- Subcutaneous emphysema, air trapped in the subcutaneous layer of the tissues
- Sister chromatid exchange, the exchange of genetic material between two identical sister chromatids
- Singapore Colloquial English, also known as Singlish, a contact language spoken in Singapore
- Standard Canadian English, the variety of Canadian English spoken particularly across Ontario and Western Canada.

== Education ==
- Hong Kong School Certificate Examination, a standardized examination from 1974 to 2011
- Scottish Certificate of Education was a certificate of the Scottish Secondary Education system incorporating Standard and Higher Grades
- Sami Shamoon College of Engineering, a STEM-oriented college in southern Israel
- School of Continuing Education, an adult continuing education school in Orange County, California
- School of Continuing Education, Hong Kong Baptist University, one of the seven schools of the Hong Kong Baptist University
- Service Children's Education, a support agency acting as a Local Education Authority for British service schools overseas

== Computing ==
- System Center Essentials, a performance and event monitoring product from Microsoft
- Service Creation Environment, a development environment used to create the services present in an Intelligent Network
- Scalable Cluster Environment, a software project for cluster computing
- Sony Interactive Entertainment, formerly named Sony Computer Entertainment

== Organisations ==
- Southern California Edison, investor-owned electric utility in California, USA.
- China SCE Property, a property developer in Fujian, China
- Sony Computer Entertainment, a former video game division within Sony Corporation
- Singapore Combat Engineers, one of the combat arms of the Singapore Armed Forces
- Saudi Council of Engineers
- Societas cooperativa Europaea (Latin for European Cooperative Society, a European legal society for companies or individuals from different EU states

== Other ==
- Starfleet Corps of Engineers, a series of books from the fictional Star Trek universe
- State College Regional Airport, an airport in State College, Pennsylvania with IATA code "SCE"
- Swedish Cyprus Expedition, a project to systematically investigate the archaeology of the early history of Cyprus.
