= Youth in Saudi Arabia =

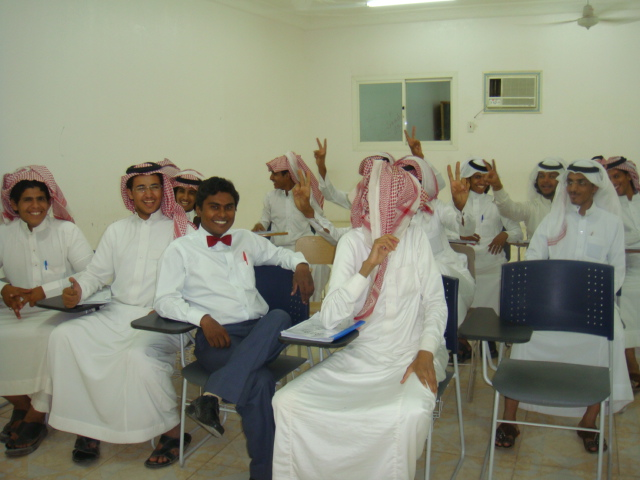
Saudi Arabian students in school. Because schools are segregated by gender, there are only males in the class.

Youth in Saudi Arabia are the citizens of the Kingdom of Saudi Arabia who are between the ages of 15 and 24. In 2015, the estimated population was around twenty-seven million, and 19.11% of the population was between the ages of 15 and 24.

Religion impacts the lives of Saudi youth. The government enforces a strict form of Islam called Wahhabism as the national religion that affects the areas of family formation, education and political activism. Islam teaches youth that family should be central to their lives and to respect their parents. Education in Saudi Arabia largely focuses on learning Islam and memorization. These focuses contribute to the employment difficulties of youth as they are not learning the skills that employers look for. High cost of living and career opportunities were two primary concerns of youth in 2014.

Saudi youth have difficulties being active participants in politics because of the strict Wahhabi religious doctrine and possible punishments. Saudi youth do want a say in their country's political policies and are achieving this by using popular media. The Tenth Development Plan's objectives address ways in which youth would be involved in the development of the country.

Two health concerns that are present in Saudi youth are smoking and obesity. A 2011 study done in Riyadh found that smoking rates among Saudi youth were "high and alarming". Out of 1272 students studied, the percentage of students that were currently smoking was about 19.5% (31.2% of boys and 8.9% of girls), and the percentage of students that had smoked before was about 42.8% (55.6% of boys and 31.4% of girls). Almost 60% of the Saudi population over sixteen was considered obese in 2014.

== Government's acknowledgement of youth ==
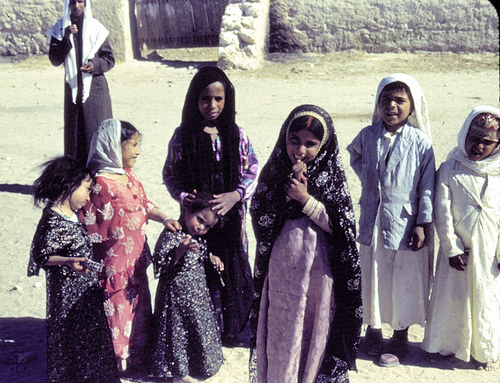
Young children in Hofuf, 1939

No official national youth policy currently exists; however, the Ministry of Economy and Planning and the United Nations Development Programme worked together between 2009 and 2013 in order to make a "national youth strategy". The National Youth Strategy Project received $1,182,720 and aimed at "enhancing participation of youth in national development processes".

The Ninth Development Plan (2010–2014) has a youth section that talks about factors affecting youth and ways to improve their lives. Under the Ninth Developmental Plan, Saudi Arabia's primary governmental agency that is responsible for youth and youth programming is the General Presidency for Youth Welfare, which has a budget of $1.9 billion.

The General Presidency for Youth Welfare promotes multiple cultural activities, including arts and crafts and drama and folklore clubs. It oversees clubs and agencies involved in youth sports and social activities in order to guarantee "balanced development across all youth activities".

The Tenth Development Plan (2015–2019) had as some of its objectives to promote and enhance education as well as youth participation in the development of the country.

== Religion ==
In a 2011 report, it was found that sympathy or agreement with the Al-Qaeda vision of Islam or its ideology is not common among young Saudis because the government of Saudi Arabia termed it as a "deviant" view of Islam.

In 2014, a survey conducted for the Boston Consultancy Group report on Saudi youth found that 97% of them considered Islam "as the main influence that shapes their identity."

The Tenth Development Plan (2015-2019) had as one of its objectives to maintain Islamic teachings and values in the lives of its citizens, including youth.

Due to increased media participation and education, young Saudis are forming their own ideas and views about what is religiously acceptable. Younger Saudis "do not defer to the clerics' pronouncements to the same extent as their older siblings and parents did", according to Caryle Murphy's article, Saudi Arabia's Youth and the Kingdom's Future.

== Family formation ==
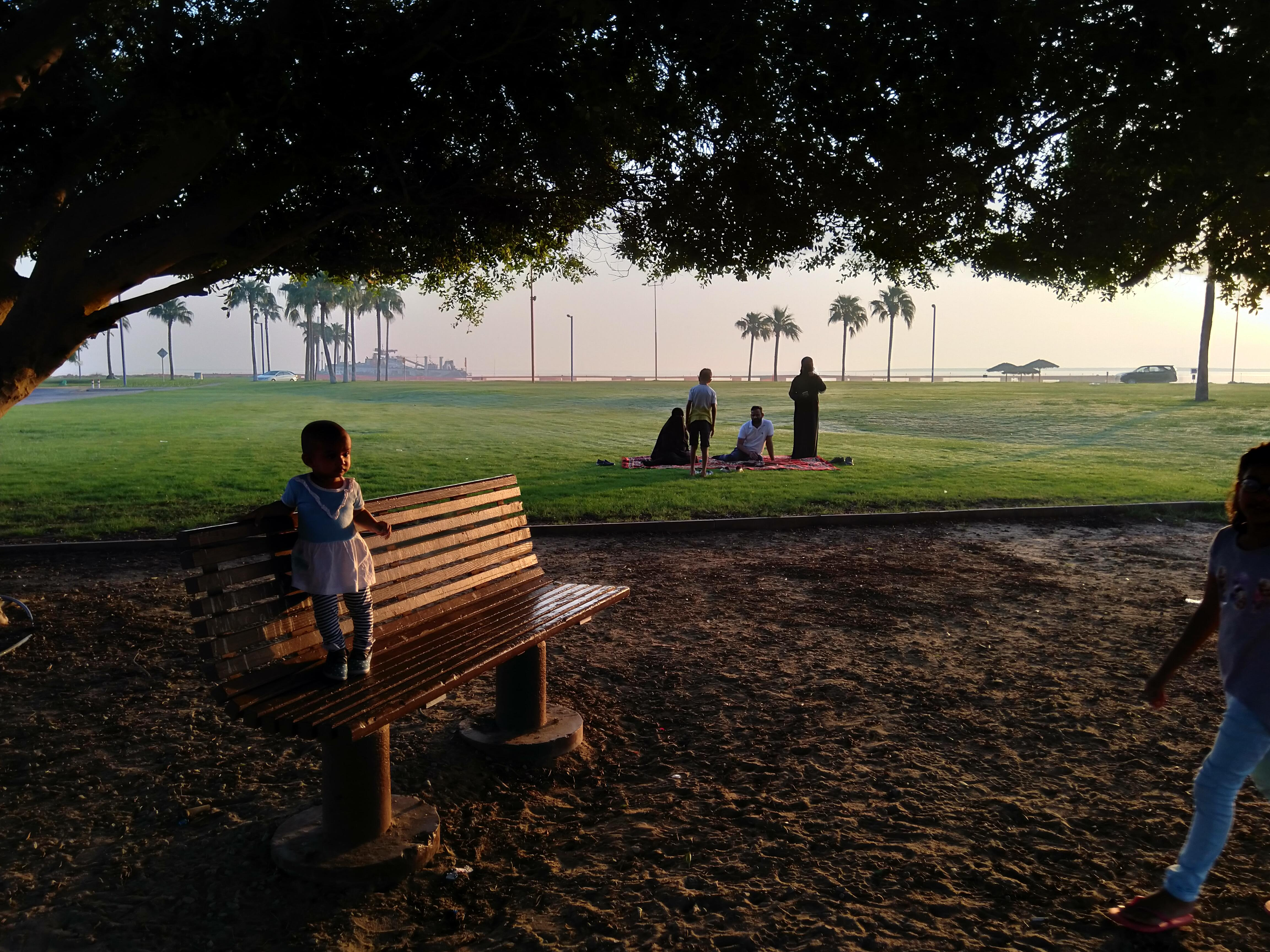
A family at a park in Jubail

The teachings of Islam say that the family is central in a person's life and that youth should always show respect towards parents. 98% of young Saudis that responded to a 2014 survey had as one of their goals to make their parents proud. 86% of respondents to the same survey said that they "socialize face-to-face with their parents and relatives every day".

Traditionally, the family in Saudi Arabia was hierarchical, with the male ruling over the female and the old ruling over the young. Women were seen as crucial to maintaining the structure of the family by assuming the tasks of managing the house and taking care of the children. Women, though, are no longer confined to the house because more are receiving an education and working outside the home.

Young people are also delaying the age at which they get married, according to Saudi Arabia's Ninth Development Plan. Between the years of 1979 and 2007, there was an increase in the age of marriage, with males being 1.9 years older (27.2 years old) and females being 4.6 years older (24.6 years old). The high cost of marriage ceremonies, and getting and furnishing a home are two reasons that the Ninth Development Plan cites for youth delaying marriage.

== Education ==
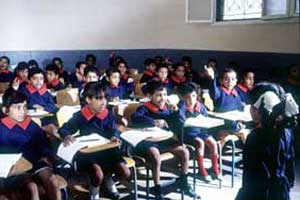
Saudi children at school in Sayhat, Qatif, 1972

Education is overseen by the Ministry of Education. The 2015 budget increased spending on education by 3%, to $58 billion.

The adjusted net enrollment rate for primary school age children was 97% in 2014, according to the World Bank Group. In 2013, the net enrollment rate in secondary school for both sexes was 91.55%.

Students attend primary school starting at the age of six until they are twelve years old. Intermediate school is attended by youth that are ages twelve to fifteen, and fifteen- to eighteen-year-olds participate in secondary school.

Schools are segregated by sex: boys are taught by male teachers, while girls are primarily taught by female teachers. Originally, women's education focused on domestic science. They were primarily taught how to be a good mother and wife.

Curriculum that is being taught to students in Saudi Arabia has a religious base, specifically Islamic teachings. It emphasizes memorization, rather than solving the problem. Because employers do not always utilize these skills in their business, it is increasingly difficult for young Saudis to find a job. In response to the educational shortcomings, King Abdullah established his Public Education Development Project, which was launched in 2007. This was an approximately $3 billion program designed to improve public education. Some of the goals that this project has for improving youth education are "improving the educational environment and preparing to utilize information and communication technology (ICT) in education to stimulate learning. This is in order to achieve a higher level of efficiency in acquiring information and training, as well as strengthening personal and creative capabilities, developing skills and hobbies, satisfying psychological needs of students, and strengthening ideas as well as national and social relations through extra-curricular activities of various kinds". The Public Education Development Project and King Abdullah's scholarship seeks to help students develop problem solving skills as well as a comprehensive world view by allowing students to study in other countries of the world.

The Ninth Development Plan addresses some policies that can be implemented in order to make the educational system better. For example, it aims to widen the participation of youth in school and university activities, which would make the school more connected to society.

Upgrading the academic curriculum so that it is "in line with contemporary knowledge", "developing the curriculum of science, mathematics, engineering and technology" and making sure that Saudi university and scholarship graduates end up in the labor market are three educational objectives of the Tenth Development Plan.

Even with these plans in place, there is still criticism of the educational system of Saudi Arabia. Almost half of the students at the primary and secondary education level were not learning at the levels they should be, and one in three Saudi youth said that education was in their top three areas of concern, according to a 2014 survey. Saudi youth believed that they were receiving a good education in terms of Islamic teachings and basic academic subjects; however, they did not feel that they were being adequately prepared to do well in the workforce. These feelings emanated from not being taught soft skills, such as problem solving, teamwork and collaboration, effective communication and critical thinking, that are valued by private-sector employers.

In 2013, 58% (gross percent) of the Saudi population was enrolled in tertiary education. It is estimated that 63% of the degrees that students get are not "useful for private-sector jobs".

== Economics ==
In 2015, the estimated unemployment rate for Saudis that are between the ages of sixteen and twenty-nine is 29%. Approximately 1.9 million Saudis will enter the labor force in the next decade.

Saudi youth cited career opportunities and the high cost of living as concerns in a 2014 survey. Both of these areas had regional disparities. For example, 43% of youth respondents from the northern part of the country said that career opportunities were a great concern. 23% of youth respondents from the center part of the country, which includes the capital Riyadh, cited career opportunities as a concern. The differences in responses could be the result of a greater number of jobs being available in the capital.

Nearly 60% of youth respondents cited the high cost of living as one of their top three concerns in the 2014 survey. A young Saudi commented that "currently, salaries are very low, and the cost of living is very high. If a young man earns 3,000 or 4,000 riyals per month, how can he afford the cost of living when he might be spending around 200 or 300 riyals per day?" 77% of youth from the east and 71% of youth from the south compared to 38% of youth that resided in the center that participated in the 2014 survey cited high cost of living as a top concern.

Youth in this country are concerned with the number of foreigners employed within the country because they limit the number of jobs native Saudis can get. In 2013, it was estimated that about 7.5 million foreigners were legally working within the country. King Salman and the kingdom's ministries are trying to address this situation through a process known as "Saudization". Saudization is a national movement that seeks to increase the number of citizens employed within the country. Requiring employers to meet quotas of Saudi workers is one way that Saudization will be achieved and affects youth because they are or will be entering the labor force.

== Suffrage and political engagement ==
Men are allowed to vote at twenty-one years old. In 2015, women were allowed to vote in the municipal elections that was held in December 2015. They will only be allowed to vote at the municipal level elections.

"Arbitrary arrest and long-term detention" for anyone that speaks out against government policies are two reasons that youth are deterred from being politically active. Access to any improvements that the government tries to make in regard to unemployment compensation, housing availability and education would also be lost if youth participated in protest or explicit discontent with the government. The Wahhabi religious doctrine, which the country promotes, states that "opposition to the government, especially street protests, is religiously forbidden".

Saudi youth want a say in governmental policies and procedures because of their increased exposure to the world through social media and the difficulties they are facing (unemployment, living costs and education). In 2012, it was estimated that YouTube use in the country increased 260%, and an estimated one-third of Saudis are active Twitter users. Saudi youth will use Twitter in order to voice their discontent over a lack of political rights, and 63% of youth said that they would like the government to give them increased participation and access to formulating and implementing policy at the local level in a 2011 survey.

In order for youth to effectively participate in the country's development process, part of the Tenth Development Plan's objectives seek to speed up the process of implementing the National Youth Strategy as well as conduct surveys asking youth to comment on their issues and needs, so that the country knows what services to provide for them.

== Health risks ==
Smoking is one health concern that affects Saudi youth. Smoking prevalence among sixteen- to eighteen-year-old students in secondary schools located in Riyadh was "high and alarming", according to a 2011 study published in the Annals of Thoracic Medicine. Out of 1272 students studied, the percentage of students that were currently smoking was about 19.5% (31.2% of boys and 8.9% of girls), and the percentage of students that had smoked before was about 42.8% (55.6% of boys and 31.4% of girls). Smoking habits are linked to males, friends that smoke and parents that smoke. Two reasons why youth in Saudi Arabia smoked were because it made people "look more comfortable" and made people of the opposite sex more attractive. 88.4% of students believed that smoking is harmful to one's health, but only 31.8% of students wanted to quit smoking, according to the 2011 study. The authors of this study believe that educational programs on the risks of smoking need to be implemented in schools in order to reduce smoking rates.

Obesity is another health concern that affects Saudi youth. Almost 60% of the Saudi population over age sixteen was overweight. 21.8% of male students (18–24 years) that were studying at the College of Health and Sciences campus at Qassim University were overweight, and 15.7% were obese, according to a 2010 study.

The risk of attaining cardiovascular disease can be high among youth. Out of 523 males students chosen from schools in Arar with a mean age of 16.7 years, 30.4% were obese and 17.2% were overweight. 33.5% of participants in the study were at risk of getting cardiovascular disease. The risk of cardiovascular disease was "strongly related to different dietary and lifestyle habits".

== See also ==
- Demographics of Saudi Arabia
- Culture of Saudi Arabia
