= Arabian Shield Cooperative Insurance Company =

Arabian Shield Cooperative Insurance الدرع العربي للتأمين التعاوني
- Company type: Private
- ISIN: SA000A0MLUH9
- Industry: Insurance
- Founded: 19 June 2007
- Founder: 2007
- Headquarters: Riyadh, Saudi Arabia
- Key people: Sultan Al Kabeer (Chairman); Basem Odeh (CEO)
- Revenue: 463,627,000 Saudi riyal (2019)
- Total assets: 1,137,426,000 Saudi riyal (2019)

Arabian Shield Cooperative Insurance Company is an insurance companies within the Kingdom of Saudi Arabia.

== History ==
The company was established on May 19, 2007. It is located in Riyadh. It operates as a Saudi public joint stock company and is licensed by Saudi Arabian Monetary Agency (SAMA)."

== Summary ==
Arabian Shield Cooperative Insurance Company sells insurance products including motor, marine, property and medical insurance. In addition, the company also provides claim settlement services to its policyholders. Its customer base includes the private individuals and also the corporate clients.

== 2012 ==
Arabian Shield Cooperative Insurance Company was among the major gainers in Saudi markets gaining more than 35% during the first month of the year.

== See also ==
- Saudi Arabia
- Health care in Saudi Arabia
- Saudi Commission for Health Specialties
