= Obesity in Saudi Arabia =

Obesity in Saudi Arabia is a growing health concern, with health officials stating that it is one of the country's leading causes of preventable deaths. According to Forbes, Saudi Arabia ranks 29 on a 2007 list of the fattest countries with a percentage of 68.3% of its citizens being overweight (BMI≥25). Compounding the problem, according to a presentation at the 3rd International Obesity Conference in February 2014, is that obesity-related surgeries are not covered under Saudi healthcare.

== See also ==
- Health in Saudi Arabia
- Epidemiology of obesity
- Saudi Commission for Health Specialties
