= Oo-za-we-kwun Centre =

Coordinates: 50.010660°N 100.313549°W

Oo-za-we-kwun Centre, Rivers, Manitoba, Canada

The Oo-za-we-kwun Centre at Rivers, Manitoba, Canada, was a vocational training center for Canadian First Nations people located on the abandoned Canadian Forces Base Rivers. The Centre was designed to be a unique and innovative experiment to improve the well-being of Canada's poorest demographic group.

The Air Force base provided a 2,500-acre site and the Centre had a maximum population of 3,000 people. It included an industrial park with four industries, a day care centre, a school, a recreation program and counseling services. The Centre opened in 1971 and was closed in 1980 when the then Department of Indian Affairs removed its funding. The land had some continued military use until 1982 when Federal Government then offered the base for sale to the public.

== Background ==
The concept was first developed by Frank E. Price (1931-2015) in the proposal, Rivers Training Centre: A Social Change Program for Indian People. The identified needs of First Nations people included lack of training and saleable skills, and the inability to relate to an urban environment. Crucially, the report does not indicate how these needs were determined (see Evaluation section).

The stated purpose of the Oo-za-we-kwun Centre was to "provide technical training facilities to Indians so they may find better employment". Its objective was to provide "Canadian Natives with training, employment and a future ... bringing together different cultures into a closely-knit community environment." According to its own publicity, the Centre was "designed to help Native People participate more effectively in a modern Canadian environment. The residential family program includes a five-week Life Skills course followed by a two-year transfer of learning period during which counselling, paid employment, and community activities are available." The Centre was named after Oo-za-we-kwun (O-zah-wah-sko-gwan-na-be, or Yellow Quill), c1840-1910, chief of the then Portage Band of the Plains Ojibway. He was signatory of the 1871 Treaty One between Canada and the First Nations.

The Oo-za-we-kwun Centre was initially funded by the federal government department of Indigenous and Northern Affairs Canada, the Manitoba Government and the Manitoba Indian Brotherhood although the latter two pulled out during the life of the Centre.

== Saskatchewan New Start Life Skills Program ==
The main intervention program was controversial. It was based on a model known as Saskatchewan New Start Life Skills. Life Skills training is an intervention approach to develop problem solving behaviours appropriately and responsibly used in the management of personal affairs". The model has been found to be robust and is used in a 31 sites in Canada ( ) and dozens more in Africa. Although subject to harsh criticism at the time (see below), the model has since been well validated.

== Industries ==
There were four factories on the site: Edson Industries, Arnold Manufacturing, Tim-Br-Fab Industries and Sekine Cycle. These industries were required to hire at least 25% First Nations employees, supplying a practical work experience aspect to the program.

=== Sekine Cycle ===
Sekine was a Japanese bicycle manufacturer founded in 1912. The company opened a plant at the Centre in 1973. It employed 100 people, about 80% First Nations supervised by Japanese engineers and had an annual output of as many as 50,000 bicycles. After the Centre closed, so did Sekine’s Canadian operations. In January 1982, it went into receivership and its assets were sold.

=== Edson Industries ===
Edson was truck camper and trailer manufacturer that moved from Neepawa, Manitoba, to benefit from the subsidies provided. It employed 80 people and went bankrupt in 1983.

=== Arnold Manufacturing ===
Arnold produced vinyl furniture, which then evolved into fiberglass seating, as it was sturdy and vandal-proof, for restaurants such as McDonald's. After closure, they moved to Windsor, Ontario. The company was involuntarily dissolved in 1988.

=== Tim-Br-Fab Industries ===
Tim-Br-Fab produced pre-fabricated home packages. They were sold across Western Canada. The company survived. It is now located in Oak Bluff, Manitoba. It retains essentially the same business model.

== Participants and employees ==
Over 10,000 people took part in the Oo-za-we-kwun program. A number of important Canadian Indigenous leaders worked or trained there:

- Ernie Daniels, chief of Long Plain First Nation (1978-1984) and Vice-chief of the Assembly of First Nations
- Eli Taylor, chief of Sioux Valley Dakota Nation, elder
- Alan Pratt, elder, Sioux Valley Dakota Nation
- Norman Fleury, professor Brandon University, elder, Metis National Council.
- Margaret Smith Lavallée, Elder in Residence, University of Manitoba.
- Jules Lavallée, Elder in Residence, Red River College.
- Violet Daniels, elder, Peguis First Nation
- John Hicks, Churchill, Manitoba, Chairperson, Atuqtuarvik Corporation
- Ken Courchene Jr., Chief, Sagkeeng First Nation.

There is an active "alumni", composed largely of children who were brought up at the Centre.

== Evaluations ==
The Centre was the subject of five evaluations and two television programs. They all had diametrically opposed conclusions. On one hand, the program was seen as innovative and successful; on the other hand, it was seen as a failure, and effort to "teach Indians to flush toilets" and an "apple factory" (i.e. an intervention meant to turn Indigenous people into White people).

Haig Report (1975) This report investigated if the objectives and methods of the Centre were consistent with the expressed needs and desires of the Manitoba First Nations People. Conclusion I: To achieve the objectives, the larger society needs to recognize treaty obligations, develop local control and create economic opportunities. Conclusion II: Band Councils hold the key to reducing the tendency for graduates to leave the community. Conclusion III: Increase the provision of extension-type courses such as band development, on-the-job practicums for band staff and training for Department of Indian Affairs [today, Indigenous and Northern Affairs Canada] staff in working with band staff. The Haig Report found that a frequent reason for abandoning the program was participants had expected vocational training that was not provided at the Centre.

R. P. Muzychuk, An Evaluation of the Oo-za-we-kwun Centre Life Skills Course. Using pre- and post-tests, this report concluded that the Oo-za-we-kwum Life Skills program produced few positive results (six out of 44 measures).

Dunning Report (1977) R. W. Dunning was an eminent anthropologist from the University of Manitoba. In conclusion, he wrote, "What escapes my understanding is why the Indian Affairs Department has allowed this costly mistake to run its course for five full years. ... What a price to pay for this phantasy of professional planning and development." A hand-written footnote from Indigenous and Northern Affairs Canada copy, presumably written by a staff member: "Hardly objective statements - though ideologically neat. But he poses no data to support his conclusion!!" Recommendation I: Cease and abandon the Life Skills Programme forthwith. Recommendation II: Build up specific technical training. Retain the Basic Management Training Course and expand its concept. Recommendation III: Some hangars (if physically practicable) might be relocated to Indian reserve communities. Recommendation IV: Permit industries which (sic) wish to remain at the Centre to do so. (Note from the previous section, that this was unrealistic.) Recommendation V: Housing should remain in use (see photo). Recommendation VI: There should be Indian management.

Canadian Institute for Research Report (1978) The objective of this evaluation was to study the Social Programs Unit, i.e. the Life Skills provider. "The general conclusion produced by the study was that the program has been of sufficient merit to warrant its continuation for at least another three to five years. It was found that the rationale for the program has considerable merit and that it is widely supported by many respondents. ... Problems in the implementation of the program have prevented the full range of potential benefits from being realized. ... If such cooperation (of the three funding bodies) is not forthcoming, the Centre's program should be discontinued in its present form." The Band Management program was strongly supported. A major observed outcome was that participants, on returning home, tended to undertake additional training.

Post Oo-za-we-kwun Interviews This follow-up study after the Centre closed reported on the views of 26 families that had attended Oo-za-we-kwun programs. 65% had taken further training, 23% were unemployed, 73% had had no involvement with the law, 58% had perceived improved health, 62% had recommended the program to others, and 77% felt the program had given them positive changes.

== Legacy ==
An entrepreneur presently owns the base, utilizing some of the buildings for agricultural purposes. The site had a successful hog farm, Hangar Farms (CJTCR), Ltd. It now lies inactive. Perhaps the most important legacy is the personal and professional success of the children whose parents were participants or employees at the Centre. A documentary on Sekine, containing old photos of the Centre is being prepared by Derek Eidse.

== Résumé ==
So why did a successful social experiment eventually fail?

1. It was based on a faulty premise, one of colonialism and assimilation, i.e. training rural Native People in a semi-rural setting to be able to adjust to living in the city. First Nations people and communities were able to work around this defect and make good use of the facilities. They would send people to the Centre who would develop skills and return to make better communities back home. Alternatively, they would send the most troubled family in the village to benefit from two years of high-quality help.
2. There was substantial in-fighting among Manitoba chiefs who wanted the Centre to move to their community. This would be unlikely to happen with the national and provincial First Nations governance models of today.
3. The Centre came with a liberal or neo-liberal government and it fit their world view at the time. Ten years later, the governments were conservative in values social programs were seen as unsavoury. This was the same experience as the MINCOME experiment in Dauphin, Manitoba. It came into being under the social democrat government of Ed Shreyer, and died under the conservative government of Sterling Lyon.
