= British Columbia Basic Income Expert Panel Report =

2021 Assessment of income support programs

The report of the British Columbia Expert Panel on Basic Income “Covering All the Basics: Reforms for a More Just Society” was released on 28 January 2021. It provides a comprehensive assessment of data on low-income earners and income supports in British Columbia (BC) and Canada, and a summary of state-of-the-art research on basic income programs.

The BC Green Party made a study of basic income a requirement before it would support the NDP's minority government, as stated in the 2017 Confidence and Supply Agreement between the BC Green Caucus and the BC New Democrat Caucus. The expert panel members appointed to prepare the report were David Green, Professor at the University of British Columbia (Chair), Jonathan Rhys Kesselman, Professor Emeritus at the School of Public Policy at Simon Fraser University and Lindsay Tedds, Associate Professor at the University of Calgary. Daniel Perrin, Principal at Perrin, Thorau and Associates Ltd. was Lead Co-Author & Writer.

The report is based on over 40 research studies commissioned by the panel and written by “some of the best public policy economists in Canada.” The panel consulted with British Columbia residents through a web-based public engagement process and over 450 submissions were received from individuals and community organizations. In-person consultations were held with stakeholders in May 2019, and the report incorporates findings from an online survey in 2020 that was conducted using a sample of approximately 2000 British Columbians.

== Findings ==
A basic income is defined in the report as a policy that guarantees all members of a society a minimum amount of income. One type of basic income considered is the most well-known: a universal basic income (UBI). With a UBI, everyone receives a cash transfer at regular intervals, with no conditions, and no eligibility requirements except residency in the jurisdiction.

The expert panel's report concluded that a system constructed around “a basic income for all” as its main pillar “is not the most just policy option. The needs of people in this society are too diverse to be effectively answered simply with a cheque from the government.” Instead, it proposes a mixed system that applies different approaches in different circumstances, such as targeted support for specific groups like youth aging out of care and women fleeing violence. The panel made 65 recommendations to improve the existing income support system.

Two major differences between the basic income philosophy and the panel's “broader social justice-based framework” were identified. The first is that “basic income principles place considerable weight on the individual’s freedom of choice inherent in cash support.” The panel noted that “While autonomy is an important component of our framework, we believe that true autonomy is only possible when basic needs like health care, education, and housing have been addressed.”

The second difference is the panel's emphasis on two elements of public trust: policy stability and reciprocity. By policy stability, the panel means “the policies have sufficiently broad support that they will not simply be undone in the next political cycle and that they are economically sustainable.” The second aspect of public trust is reciprocity, which means institutions must be seen as just by all involved “including those who are more likely to pay into the system than draw benefits from it.” Public trust requires consideration of fiscal implications and economic incentives and impacts.

== Financing a basic income ==
To estimate the cost of a basic income, Statistics Canada's Social Policy Simulation Database and Model was employed to run 1640 simulations. These simulations were used to compare different types of basic income programs (including a universal basic income (UBI) and a refundable tax credit) by varying design parameters such as the maximum amount of the benefit.

The simulations showed that a basic income is a very costly approach to address poverty reduction. As one example, to obtain a guaranteed income at $20,000 for a single person, a universal basic income (UBI) would cost $51 billion and approximately double provincial government spending. This UBI is “orders of magnitude” more expensive than income-tested support programs that provide similar poverty reduction.

Also, financing a basic income through personal income taxes would add a material amount to the marginal effective tax rate (which affects the decision to work one more hour) and the participation tax rate (which affects the decision to work or not). Increases in these rates would create disincentive effects for all taxpayers. Tax hikes would also increase incentives to avoid or evade taxes, so are unlikely to raise an amount of revenue proportional to the increase in tax rates.

In the panel's view, there is little scope to fund basic income by eliminating existing social support programs in B.C. For example, it would not be appropriate to eliminate social support programs that target children, as these would not be replaced by a basic income that goes to adults. Due to the additional costs faced by those with disabilities, the panel believed some targeted cash and in-kind benefits would still be required. As well, temporary assistance would need to be retained in some form. This is because, to the extent that people build a basic income into their regular budget, emergency assistance may be needed for those facing an unexpected shortfall in income.

== A basic income pilot ==
As part of its mandate, the panel was asked to consider a basic income pilot. It determined that a pilot would not be useful, chiefly because pilots are, by their nature, temporary and cannot provide evidence on long-term impacts. Young people maturing into adulthood under a permanent program might choose different lifetime paths in education, occupation, and work compared to what they would choose in a pilot program. Also, people in a pilot might respond differently when they alone receive the benefit, compared to if everyone is eligible.

Further, a basic income needs to be considered in the context of how it is financed and how other policy changes interact with it. With a pilot it is not feasible to test the major taxation changes needed to finance a real-world basic income, which the panel's analysis suggests might have impacts even more salient than those on the benefit side.

== Responses to the report ==
The BC Minister of Social Development and Poverty Reduction, Nicholas Simons, said the government was reviewing the report's recommendations. BC Green Party Leader Sonia Furstenau recommended that the government act swiftly on the report's recommendations.

Former Conservative senator Hugh Segal argues "Poverty levels in B.C. will not come down as a result of any of report's recommendations." Evelyn Forget, a professor at the University of Manitoba who has studied basic income said “ ‘I don’t disagree with any changes they recommend. I just don’t think they go far enough.’ ”

William Watson applauds the “plainspokenness” of the study, and the expert panel's rigorous evaluation of a basic income program. Globe and Mail columnist Gary Mason said the report “is likely one of the most exhaustive examinations on the viability of a guaranteed income conducted anywhere in the world.”

== See also ==
- Basic income
- Guaranteed minimum income
- Negative income tax
- Universal basic income in Canada
