= Universal basic income in Canada =

Universal basic income in Canada refers to the debate and trials with basic income, negative income tax and related welfare systems in Canada. The debate goes back to the 1930s when the social credit movement had ideas around those lines. Two major basic income experiments have been conducted in Canada. Firstly the Mincome experiment in Manitoba 1974–1979, and secondly the Ontario Basic Income Pilot Project in 2017. The latter was intended to last for three years but only lasted a few months due to its subsequent cancellation by the then newly-elected Conservative government.

== History ==
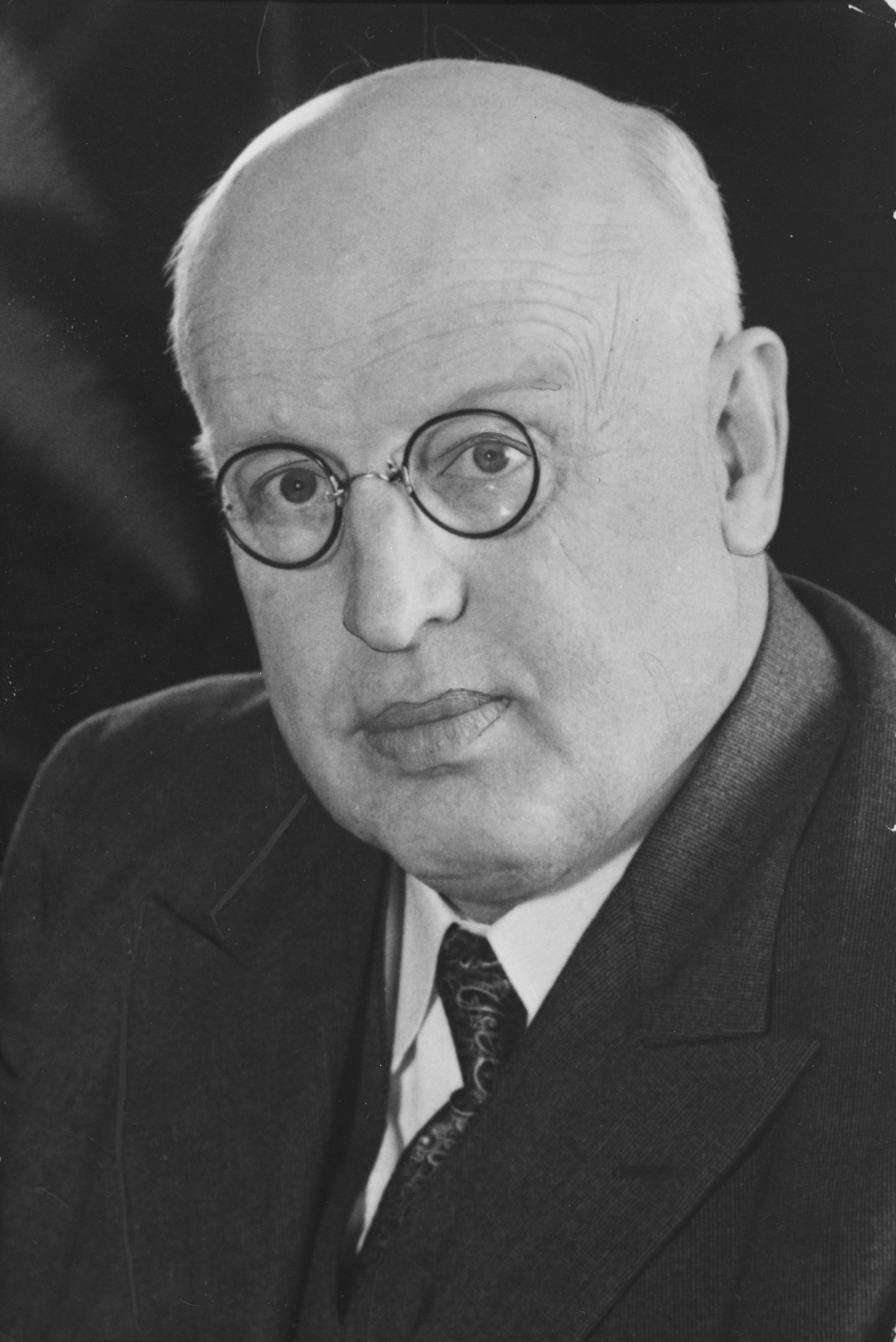
William Aberhart

William Aberhart, Premier of Alberta, was inspired by Major C. H. Douglas Social Credit theory and tried to implement a basic income for Albertans during the 1930s. However, he was thwarted in his attempts by the Federal Government of the time.

In 1970, the Canadian Department of National Health and Welfare issued a white paper which both emphasized the ability of NIT to decrease poverty but at the potential expense of decreased work incentive. Specifically, the white paper stated:

An overall guaranteed income program...worthy of consideration must offer a substantial level of benefit to people who are normally in the labour market. Therefore a great deal of further study and investigation, is needed to find out what effects such a program would have on people's motivation and on their incentives to work and save. Until these questions are answered, the fear of its impact on productivity will be the main deterrent to the introduction of a general overall guaranteed income plan. (p. 126)

Following this stance, the National Council of Welfare advocated in 1976 for the implementation of the guaranteed annual income in Canada.

In order to determine real-life responses to NIT implementation, the US government undertook four income maintenance experiments; they transpired in New Jersey and Pennsylvania (1968–1972), rural areas of North Carolina and Iowa (1970–1972), Seattle and Denver (1970–1978), and Gary Indiana (1971–1974). These prospective large-scale field studies were truly remarkable due to their size and the fact that families were randomized to either an experimental arm (i.e., NIT) or control arm (usual tax practice). Three major objectives of these interventions were to measure the labour supply response of NIT recipients, understand the effect of varying the base guarantee level and tax rate, and to make a better estimate of the cost of implementing such a program.

=== Mincome ===
In Canada, an analogous experiment called Mincome took place in Winnipeg and Dauphin, Manitoba, between 1974 and 1979. Importantly, the city of Dauphin served as a saturation site, since all 10,000 community members were eligible to participate (the elderly and disabled were exempt from the four American NIT experiments); four foci of Mincome were an economic arm (examining labour response), a sociologic research division (examining the family formation and community cohesion), an administrative programme, and a statistical division. Unfortunately, the ambitious project ran into significant budgetary problems early on and neither the newly elected Progressive Conservative government in Ottawa nor the Tory government in Manitoba felt strongly about providing further funding. As stated by Hum and Simpson:

The original budget of $17 million was never more than a wild guess and, in the event, proved far inadequate. The inflationary price increases of the 1970s, coupled with a larger than anticipated unemployment rate, meant that the proportion of the total going to programme expenses exceeded estimates and was not under the control of the researchers. (p. 44)

Ultimately the Dauphin data which was collected at great expense to the taxpayers and time from participants (in the first social experiment ever conducted in Canada) remains largely unexamined. However, some of the participant interviews were released and provide support for the efficacy of NIT. For instance, Amy Richardson, a mother of six whose husband was disabled said:

It was enough to bring your income up to where it should be. It was enough to add some cream to the coffee. Everybody was the same so there was no shame. (p.25)

Doreen Henderson, a stay at home mother whose husband worked as a janitor also appreciated the benefits of NIT; she said:

Give them enough money to raise their kids. People work hard, and it's still not enough. This isn't welfare. This is making sure kids have enough to eat...They should have kept it (NIT). It made a real difference. (p.26)

In general, the average reduction in workforce in the US sites was about 13%, with most of the reduction in labour from secondary (typically the wives) and tertiary (typically older children) earners as opposed to the primary earner (usually the husbands). In Mincome the reduction in work effort was more modest: 1% for men and 3% for wives. When the experiments were conducted, it was less socially acceptable for women to work outside the home. According to Rossi and Lyall only 40% of wives who participated in the experiment worked outside the home and their earning power was low due to limited and discontinuous work experience. As such, the authors contend that wives' labour involvement was marginal and when faced with competing tasks of looking after the household and raising children, the additional income provided by NIT was sufficient to justify an exit from the labor market. However, this phenomenon was predominantly observed in Caucasian wives whereas African American and Hispanic women exhibited a small increase in labor force participation. The decrease in labor involvement of teenage children was correlated to higher rates of high school graduation. A potential explanation is that the additional income from government assistance meant that young adults could stay in school as opposed to joining the workforce in order to support their families. This has the potential positive long-term effect of allowing youth to find higher-wage employment. In summary, the work supply response to NIT was very complex; however, data from the American studies would argue against a dramatic decline in the labour force.

=== Basic income in Canada today (2010–) ===
As of 2014, the Liberal Party of Canada, the New Democratic Party (NDP), the Green Party of Canada, the Pirate Party of Canada, provincial party Québec Solidaire and former conservative senator Hugh Segal advocate for basic income in Canada. Mike Redmond, former leader of the New Democratic Party of Prince Edward Island, supports a basic income pilot project in Prince Edward Island.

In November 2013, a poll commissioned by the Trudeau Foundation found that 46% of Canadians favoured and 42% opposed replacing current economic assistance with a guaranteed national income.

Canadian Prime Minister Justin Trudeau announced a new trial in March 2016.

=== Ontario 2017 Basic Income Pilot Project ===
In Ontario's Basic Income Pilot Project had a budget of $150,000,000, the 4,000 participants received up to $16,989 per year for a single person, less 50% of any earned income; or up to $24,027 per year for a couple, less 50% of any earned income, in monthly installments.

Although the incoming Progressive Conservative government had promised to maintain the three-year pilot program, its cancellation was announced in August 2018, 10 months after the previous Liberal administration started distributing payments.

Minister of Children and Youth Services Lisa MacLeod said the decision was taken due to high costs, and because ministry staff indicated that "the program didn't help people become 'independent contributors' to the economy."

In fact, most anecdotal reports in the popular press do not indicate that entrepreneurship was a preferred goal for participants, (although one anecdotal report described a couple who kept their existing business afloat with the program's payments).

About 70% of participants were already employed when entering the program, in low-paid positions which made it difficult to pay expenses such as rent and food.

Journalistic reports tended to focus on non-entrepreneurial participant outcomes contributing to personal stability, such as augmenting disability payments, paying for education and student loans, purchasing new eyeglasses while remaining in a low-paid museum job, paying for transportation costs (such as bus fare to work rather than walking for an hour and a half), and purchasing necessary items as fresh produce, hospital parking passes, "winter clothes they couldn't [previously] afford and staying warm", etc.

Anti-poverty groups were "stunned" by the decision to discontinue the program. The Ontario Coalition Against Poverty declared that the decision "demonstrates a reckless disregard for the lives of nearly 4,000 people." Local politicians in Hamilton passed a resolution "denouncing" discontinuation of the program.

In contrast, from the viewpoint of the current government, this basic income pilot program is considered an ineffective use of resources, because the first priority for addressing poverty needs to be getting all residents off of welfare rolls and into employment, not providing assistance to people who are already working.

Research into effective interventions for individuals suffering poverty and insecurity as a result of low-paid or precarious employment can be challenging, and researcher Kwame McKenzie noted that it is not easy to get 6,000 people to participate in a study. Ending the study early will make it difficult to gather conclusive data regarding the research goal of determining "what happens when low-wage, precarious workers receive a financial top-up."

One op-ed writer opined that the study was being ended early due to fears that the results would show that the program worked.

Payments concluded in March 2019.

=== British Columbia Basic Income Expert Panel Report ===
The British Columbia Basic Income Expert Panel Report assesses a basic income for British Columbia. Among the types of basic income examined is a universal basic income (UBI). The BC Green Party made a study of basic income a requirement before it would support the NDP's minority government and, in July 2018, the BC Basic Income Expert Panel was appointed. The final report, "Covering All the Basics: Reforms for a More Just Society", was released on 28 January 2021. It is based on findings from over 40 research studies commissioned by the panel. Globe and Mail columnist Gary Mason said the report "is likely one of the most exhaustive examinations on the viability of a guaranteed income conducted anywhere in the world."

The expert panel concludes that a system constructed around "a basic income for all" as its main pillar "is not the most just policy option. The needs of people in this society are too diverse to be effectively answered simply with a cheque from the government." Instead, it proposes a mixed system that applies different approaches in different circumstances, such as targeted support for specific groups like youth aging out of care and women fleeing violence.

A basic income was found to be a very costly approach to address poverty reduction, and a UBI is "orders of magnitude" more expensive than income-tested support programs that provide similar poverty reduction. Simulations using Statistics Canada's Social Policy Simulation Database and Model show that to obtain a guaranteed income of $20,000 for a single person, a universal basic income (UBI) would cost $51 billion and approximately double provincial government spending.

The panel also determined that a basic income pilot would not be useful, chiefly because pilots are, by their nature, temporary and cannot provide evidence on long-term impacts.

== Models ==
The first model under the GAI is the negative income tax (NIT). Negative income tax works on the assumption that families who earn below the low-income threshold should receive aid in the form of direct grants rather than paying taxes. This allows heads of a family unit to use their financial resources as they best see fit rather than being constrained by the traditional income assistance programs, which typically have means tests, time limits and other restrictions. Experiments using the negative income tax model have been completed in the United States in the late 1960s through the early 1970s.

The NIT model was also tested in Canada in the 1970s in Manitoba; it was called the Mincome experiment. It allowed every participating family unit to receive a minimum cash benefit, with every dollar over the benefit amount taxed at 60%. The results showed a modest impact on labor markets, with family working hours decreasing 5%. These potential economic costs can be offset by the opportunity cost of working. The opportunity cost of working more is spending less time with their families and on education. Mothers spent more time rearing newborns, and the educational impacts are regarded as a success. Students in these families showed higher test scores and lower dropout rates. There was also an increase in adults doing continuing education.

The second model that falls under the guaranteed annual income concept is the unconditional basic income also known as the universal demogrant (UD) model. This is a payment to all persons regardless of income. It is usually favored by those who see the GAI as a right of citizenship and whose belief in the goal of decreasing poverty through providing the basic income and more equally sharing the economic benefits of society.

== Financial model ==
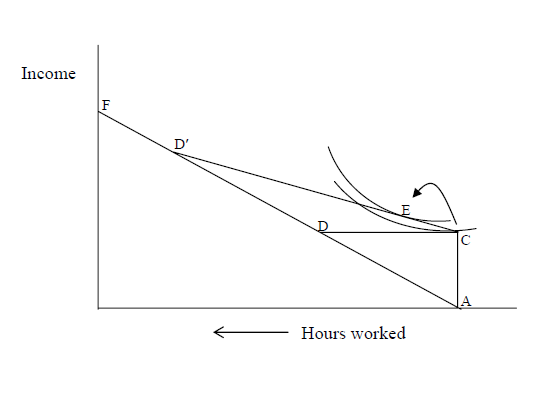
Financial model

For any income earned up to a breakpoint value, the government would provide a progressively small cash transfer. The concept is summarized by the formula B=G-TY where B is the net amount paid by the government to the citizen (if it is a positive value) or tax paid (if a negative value), G is the minimum guaranteed payment, Y is the gross annual income, and T is the tax rate. As such, if a person has no income, they will receive a minimum guaranteed payment (G); all subsequent income is taxed at a rate T which is less than 100 percent. A classic diagram in economics illustrating this is shown in Figure 1. It is important to remember that while the y-axis demonstrates increasing gross income, the x-axis displays a decreasing number of hours worked. With a negative income tax, individuals who have no income would earn a minimum amount (represented in Figure 1 as a value equal to 'C') instead of nothing (A). As part of a traditional welfare system, individuals receiving assistance would be taxed at a rate of 100% (demonstrated in the line connecting 'C' and 'D') and as such the net income level is unchanged. However, negative income tax provides an incentive for those receiving government assistance to work (as represented by line C to D'), as they are taxed at a rate of less than 100%. The last 'F' is the break-point value for annual income, above which an individual would not qualify for assistance.

== Books and articles ==
=== Books ===
Basic Income for Canadians: the key to a healthier, happier, more secure life for all, by Evelyn L Forget Basic Income for Canadians – The key to a healthier, happier, more secure life for all

=== Articles ===
- Guaranteed annual income: why Milton Friedman and Bob Stanfield were right, by Hugh Segal Guaranteed annual income: why Milton Friedman and Bob Stanfield were right
- Scrapping Welfare, by Hugh Segal Scrapping Welfare
- Should Canada have a guaranteed annual income?, by Kevin Milligan Should Canada have a guaranteed annual income?
- Understanding Guaranteed Income by Chandra Pasma & Jim Mulvale
- The problem isn't giving people money when they don't work ... it's taking it away when they do, by Andrew Coyne
- The Town with no Poverty, by Evelyn Forget The Town with No Poverty: The Health Effects of a Canadian Guaranteed Annual Income Field Experiment
- On Basic Income: go big or go home by Stephen Gordon The Basic Income: Go big, or go home
- On the political economy of a basic income, by Stephen Gordon
- Income Security for Working-Age Adults, by John Stapleton
- Rethinking Income Support: A Guaranteed Income, by Ken Battle
- Negative income tax and labour market participation, by Samir Amine & Pedro Lagos Dos Santos

== See also ==
- Guaranteed minimum income
- Mincome Program
- Negative income tax
- Basic income
- Precariat, social class formed by people suffering unstable employment
- British Columbia Basic Income Expert Panel Report
