= Poverty in Ontario =

Poverty in Ontario refers to people living in the province of Ontario, Canada who are deprived of or facing serious challenges in meeting basic needs such as shelter, food, clothing and other essential needs. Based on relative and absolute measures, there is a significant level of poverty in Ontario.

== Measures of poverty ==
The provincial or federal governments of Ontario do not use a single poverty measure. Statistics Canada provides several poverty indicating measures such as Low-Income Measure (LIM), Low-Income Cut-Off (LICO) and Market-Basket Measure (MBM). Other measures used include Depth of Poverty and Ontario Housing Measure. Most of these measures are relative indicators of poverty. They are most effective in analyzing the characteristics of the relatively worst off families and reporting trends. The Ontario government uses an array of these measures for its programs.

Statistical Indicators of Poverty in Ontario
| Measure | Description | 2010 | 2009 |
|---|---|---|---|
| Low-Income Measure (LIM) | % of people below 50% of the median national income | 13.9% | 13.1% |
| Low Income Cut-Off After-Tax (LICO-AT) | % of families below the income threshold who "will likely devote a large share of their income on necessities" | 8.8% | 10.1% |
| Market Basket Measure (MBM) | % low income families; disposable income below the cost of basket of basic goods and services | | 10.5% |
| Ontario Housing Measure | % of households with children below 40% of the median household income and who spend 40% or more on housing | 5.0% | 5.4% |
| Social Assistance Beneficiaries | Beneficiaries under Ontario Works program and Ontario Disability Support Program | 841,115 (6.3%) | 797,591 (6.1%) |
| Food Bank Usage | | 395,106 (3.0%) | 402,056 (3.0%) |

Several reports have provided insights about the absolute level of poverty in Ontario. According to the Household Food Insecurity in Canada report by University of Toronto affiliated research group PROOF, 8.2% of Ontario's households face severe or moderate food insecurity. According to the 2011 Household Food Insecurity in Canada report, 16.4% of children were living in food insecure households. According to the Salvation Army's "Canada Speaks" Exposing Persistent Myths About the 150,000 Canadians Living on the Streets report 6% of Ontarians are or have been homeless.

Many aboriginal communities in Ontario such as Attawapiskat, Pikangikum, Constance Lake, Eabametoong and Kashechewan have been compared to the world's poorest. They are severely lacking in basic infrastructure including clean water, sanitation, housing, roads, education, health and employment services.

== Demographics of poverty ==
Poverty impacts at-risk groups severely. These groups include children, women, disabled persons, single parents, aboriginals, recent immigrants, visible minorities and rural communities. For instance, in 2006 57% of First Nations children lived in low-income families compared to 21% of the non-aboriginal children. Low-income rate for lone-parents is twice that of others. Regardless of marital status, education or age, racialized groups (non-aboriginal, non-white) face high levels of poverty. In Toronto, 62% of the poor persons are from racialized groups.

== Poverty by region ==
In Ontario, poverty is concentrated in certain regions or neighbourhoods. As noted above, many aboriginal communities face extreme poverty. According to the Poverty by Postal Code report there has been a "dramatic rise in the number of higher poverty neighbourhoods in the City of Toronto in the last two decades, approximately doubling every ten years, from 30 in 1981, to 66 in 1991, to 120 in 2001". Communities impacted by sharp decline in manufacturing such as Windsor and Peterborough have a high proportion of low-income neighbourhoods.

== Effects of poverty ==
=== Health ===
Poverty is an independent risk factor and social determinant of health; the lower the income level the poorer the health outcomes. In Ontario, poverty has been associated with increased rate of chronic and acute illnesses, mental illnesses, obesity and decreased life expectancy. For example, "twice as many men in the lower income group reported having diabetes as those in the highest income group, while low income women were 2.5 times as likely to have diabetes as high income women".

Poverty contributes to increased health expenditure. "It was estimated that in 2007, increasing the income of people in the lowest income quintile in Ontario to a level comparable to those in the second quintile would reduce health-care expenditures by $2.9 billion provincially and $7.6 billion federally."

=== Education ===
Poverty is directly linked to lower educational outcomes. Poor students face several structural and individual disadvantages due to their condition. Public schools in poor neighborhoods do not have the capacity to fundraise as schools in the rich neighborhoods. Low income households lack in school readiness and educational resources. Majority of poor students are "streamed" towards non-academic subjects in high schools. Educational funding and policies fail to adequately address educational resource and outcome inequalities. These factors contribute to much lower educational outcomes for poor students.

Majority of students dropping out of school in Ontario are raised in homes earning less than $30 000 a year. Poor students score 20-30% less in EQAO math and literacy tests than students from high income households. "In Canada, only 31% of youth from the bottom income quartile attended post-secondary education compared with 50.2% in the top income quartile."

=== Economy ===
Poverty greatly impacts the economic productivity of Ontario. In 2008, it was estimated that Ontario loses $4 to $6.1 billion every year due to lost income tax revenue. Canada's economic development minister Tony Clement noted "chronic housing shortages, low education outcomes and lack of access to clean drinking water jeopardize the ability of local First Nations to benefit from the significant economic, employment and business development opportunities associated with the Ring of Fire developments."

Poverty leads to increased government costs in health care, policing and crime related costs, and social services. In 2008, it was estimated that "federal and Ontario government are losing at least $10.4 billion to $13.1 billion a year due to poverty, a loss equal to between 10.8 to 16.6 per cent of the provincial budget".

=== Crime ===
Poverty and crime are interlinked on several fronts. Although studies have shown that a direct link does not exist between poverty and criminal behaviour, the majority of people arrested, convicted and imprisoned for crime are young males from low-income families. Low income aboriginals and black youth are over represented in Ontario's correctional system by many multiples. For example, "aboriginal boys aged 12 to 17 make up 2.9 per cent of the young male population. But in Ontario youth facilities they make up nearly 15 per cent of young male admissions. For black boys, the proportion of jail admissions is four times higher."

Low-income at-risk people receive more police attention, are more likely to be detained, arrested, denied bail, plead guilty, get convicted and have more difficulty reintegrating than their higher income counterparts.

Many laws target or disproportionately criminalize the poor. For example, the 1999 Safe Streets Act prohibits squeegeeing and "aggressive panhandling". In 2007, "National Anti-Drug Strategy was shifted from Health Canada to the Justice Department". Canada's prostitution laws have also been criticized as punishing the marginalized women. In Toronto, there have been efforts to prohibit homeless people from sleeping on the city streets and sidewalks.

Policing and justice system impose significant costs on governments. In 2008, it was estimated that Canada and Ontario can save $1.25 billion to $2.6 billion in crime-related costs by addressing poverty related factors of crime.

=== Social effects ===
The Canadian Senate report Reducing Barriers to Social Inclusion and Social Cohesion identified that "groups that are most at risk of low income, inadequate housing, and homelessness" are the same groups at risk of social exclusion. The same report identified poverty as an impediment to so social inclusion and social cohesion. Social Planning and Research Council of Hamilton‟s Social Landscape report showed that "there were more areas of lower voter turnout in the parts of the riding with high rates of low income". Lower political participation, increased tension between communities and economic segregation increase the risk of social and political instability in Ontario.

== See also ==
- Poverty in Canada
- Homelessness in Canada
- Unemployment in Ontario
- Ontario Basic Income Pilot Project
