= Aseel Al-Hamad =

- Born: أسيل الحمد
- Alma mater: Prince Sultan University; Alfaisal University
- Occupation: Race car driver, interior designer, entrepreneur

Aseel Al-Hamad is a Saudi Arabian interior designer, engineer, and motorsport enthusiast. She became the first female board member of the Saudi Arabian Motor Federation and is a member of the International Automobile Federation.

== Biography ==
Aseel Al-Hamad is a Saudi Arabian interior designer engineer. In 2009 she graduated from Prince Sultan University with a degree in interior design engineering, and went on to found IDegree Design, an engineering and design firm. Al-Hamad is also a member of the Saudi Council of Engineers.

Al-Hamad is a noted motorsports advocate; she became the first Saudi Arabian woman to import and own a Ferrari, and is a member of the International Automobile Federation, which appointed her to represent Saudi Arabia at the Women in Motorsport Commission. In December 2017 she was appointed as a board member of the Saudi Arabian Motor Federation (SAMF) as the first female board member.

In the wake of Saudi Arabia's lifting of a ban on women driving on 24 June 2018, Al-Hamad performed a celebratory lap in a Lotus Renault E20 prior to the opening of the 2018 French Grand Prix. This celebration received considerable attention in the media.

Prior to the 2022 Saudi Arabian Grand Prix, Al-Hamad and W Series driver Abbi Pulling became the first women to drive a Formula 1 car in Saudi Arabia.
