= Guaranteed minimum income =

Social-welfare system

Guaranteed minimum income (GMI), also called minimum income (or mincome for short), is a social-welfare system that guarantees all citizens or families an income sufficient to live on, provided that certain eligibility conditions are met, typically: citizenship and that the person in question does not already receive a minimum level of income to live on.

The primary goal of a guaranteed minimum income is reduction of poverty. Under more unconditional requirements, when citizenship is the sole qualification, the program becomes a universal basic income (UBI). Unlike a guaranteed minimum income, UBI does not typically take into account what a recipient already earns before receiving a UBI. A form of guaranteed minimum income that considers income as a criterion is the negative income tax (NIT). In this system, only individuals earning below a certain threshold receive subsidies.

== Elements ==
A system of guaranteed minimum income can consist of several elements, most notably:

- A social safety net that helps those without sufficient financial means survive through payments
- State child support, student loans and grants
- State pensions or social pensions for older adults
- Disability pensions for those who physically cannot work

== History ==
=== Pre-modern antecedents ===
Persian monarch Cyrus the Great (c. 590 to c. 529 B.C.), whose government used a regulated minimum wage, also provided special rations to families when a child was born.

Cash assistance GMI was first documented by the third century BCE Greek philosopher, Aristotle, in his review of the Athenian Constitution. The modern equivalent would be a safety net program for people with less than $1,000 USD in savings to receive $20 USD per day.

The Roman Republic and Empire offered the Cura Annonae, a regular distribution of free or subsidized grain or bread to poorer residents. The grain subsidy was first introduced by Gaius Gracchus in 123 B.C., then further institutionalized by Julius Caesar and Augustus Caesar.

The first Sunni Muslim Caliph Abu Bakr, who came to power in 632 C.E., introduced a guaranteed minimum standard of income, granting each man, woman and child ten dirhams annually. This was later increased to twenty dirhams.

=== 17th to 19th century ===
In 1662, English demographer John Graunt included in his book, Natural and Political Observations Made Upon the Bills of Mortality, an argument for GMI based on statistics collected from Bills of mortality. According to the historian of statistics Ian Hacking, this was a new method of argument for an already widespread proposal, and that advocacy for a GMI began at least thirty years before that.

In 1795, American revolutionary Thomas Paine advocated a citizen's dividend to all United States citizens as compensation for "loss of his or her natural inheritance, by the introduction of the system of landed property" (Agrarian Justice, 1795).

In the 19th century, French Emperor Napoleon Bonaparte echoed Paine's sentiments and commented that 'man is entitled by birthright to a share of the Earth's produce sufficient to fill the needs of his existence' (Herold, 1955). The American economist Henry George advocated for a dividend paid to all citizens from the revenue generated by a land value tax.

=== 20th century ===
==== 1960s ====
In 1963, Robert Theobald published the book Free Men and Free Markets, in which he advocated a guaranteed minimum income (the origin of the modern version of the phrase).

In 1966, the Cloward–Piven strategy advocated "overloading" the US welfare system to force its collapse in the hopes that it would be replaced by "a guaranteed annual income and thus an end to poverty".

In his final book Where Do We Go from Here: Chaos or Community? (1967), Martin Luther King Jr. wrote

"I am now convinced that the simplest approach will prove to be the most effective—the solution to poverty is to abolish it directly by a now widely discussed measure: the guaranteed income."

— from the chapter titled "Where We Are Going"

In 1968, James Tobin, Paul Samuelson, John Kenneth Galbraith and another 1,200 economists signed a document calling for the US Congress to introduce in that year a system of income guarantees and supplements.

In 1969, President Richard Nixon's Family Assistance Plan would have paid a minimum income to poor families. The proposal by Nixon passed in the House but never made it out of committee in the Senate.

==== Other ====
American economist Milton Friedman began advocating a basic income in the form of a negative income tax in the early 1940s. He discusses the proposal his 1962 book Capitalism and Freedom and his 1980 book Free to Choose.

In 1973, Daniel Patrick Moynihan wrote The Politics of a Guaranteed Income, in which he advocated the guaranteed minimum income and discussed Richard Nixon's Guaranteed Annual Income (GAI) proposal.

In 1987, New Zealand's Labour Finance Minister Roger Douglas announced a Guaranteed Minimum Family Income Scheme to accompany a new flat tax. Both were quashed by then Prime Minister David Lange, who sacked Douglas.

In his 1994 "autobiographical dialog", classical liberal Friedrich Hayek stated: "I have always said that I am in favor of a minimum income for every person in the country".

=== 21st century ===
In 2013, the Equal Life Foundation published the Living Income Guaranteed Proposal, illustrating a practical way to implement and fund a minimum guaranteed income.

In 2017, Harry A. Shamir (US) published the book Consumerism, or Capitalism Without Crises, in which the concept was promoted by another label, as a way to enable our civilization to survive in an era of automation and computerization and large scale unemployment. The book also innovates a method to fund the process, tapping into the underground economy and volunteerism.

Other modern advocates include Ayşe Buğra (Turkey), The Green Economics Institute (GEI), and Andrew Coyne (Canada).

== Funding ==
Tax revenues would fund the majority of GMI proposals. As most GMI proposals seek to create an earnings floor close to or above poverty lines amongst all citizens, the fiscal burden would require equally broad tax sources, such as income taxes or VATs. To varying degrees, a GMI might be funded through the reduction or elimination of other social security programs, such as unemployment insurance.

== By country ==
=== Australia ===
Special benefit is intended for those who are in financial difficulty and have no other means of support.

As of 2022, the Australian Greens support a Liveable Income Guarantee of $88 per day; meaning all those who do not have an income of at least this figure would be raised to this amount. This would raise all Australians above the Henderson poverty line (as calculated in 2022).

=== Austria ===
Social assistance is the last social safety net provided by the state (principle of subsidiarity). Social assistance is only granted if people cannot secure their livelihood either through their own efforts or through family assistance (maintenance obligation) or on the basis of a social insurance or other benefit entitlement. Due to other existing benefits in Austria, many people are not dependent on social assistance.

=== Belgium ===
In Belgium, the integration income (known before 2002 as the "minimum means of subsistence," or minimex) is a guaranteed form of financial social assistance provided by Public Centres for Social Action (CPAS).

=== Brazil ===
Minimum income has been increasingly accepted by the Brazilian government. In 2004, President Lula da Silva signed into law a bill to establish a universal basic income. This law is primarily implemented through the Bolsa Família program. Under this program, poorer families receive a direct cash payment via a government issued debit card. Bolsa Família is a conditional cash transfer program, meaning that beneficiaries receive their aid if they accomplish certain actions. Families who receive the aid must put their children in school and participate in vaccination programs. If they do not meet these requirements, they are cut off from aid. The program has been criticised as vote-buying, trading productive individuals' earning for the votes of welfare recipients As of 2011, approximately 50 million people, or a quarter of Brazil's population, were participating in Bolsa Família.

=== Canada ===
Canada has experimented with minimum income trials. During the Mincome experiment in Manitoba in the 1970s, Mincome provided lower-income families with cash transfers to keep them out of poverty. The trial was eventually ended but this was due to budget shortfalls and a change in government.

The province of Ontario began a minimum income experiment in 2017. Approximately 4000 citizens began to receive a stipend based on their family situation and income. Recipients of this program could receive upwards of $10,000 per year. Government researchers used this pilot as a way of testing to see if a minimum income can help people meet their basic needs. On 31 August 2018, following a change in government, incoming Premier Doug Ford announced that the pilot would be cancelled at the end of the current fiscal year.

In Canada, a guaranteed minimum income is generally referred to as social assistance or income assistance. Different provinces have different systems.

=== China ===
China's Minimum Livelihood Guarantee also called dibao, is a means-tested social assistance scheme introduced in 1993 and expanded to all Chinese cities in 1999.

=== Cyprus ===
In July 2013, the Cypriot government unveiled a plan to reform the welfare system in Cyprus and create a 'Guaranteed Minimum Income' for all citizens. The system was put into use in 2014.

=== Denmark ===
Kontanthjælp (formerly known as bistandshjælp) is a public benefit in Denmark granted to citizens who would otherwise not be able to support themselves or their families. In principle, cash benefits are a universal right for all citizens who meet certain statutory criteria.

=== Estonia ===
A subsistence allowance is financial help for a person or family in need, which provides minimal resources for everyday life (food, medicine, housing costs, etc.).

=== Finland ===
Subsistence allowance was introduced in 1984. Basic subsistence allowance paid by Kela may be granted to a person or family whose income and assets are insufficient to cover the necessary daily expenses.

=== France ===
In 1988, France was one of the first countries to implement a minimum income, called the Revenu minimum d'insertion. In 2009, it was turned into Revenu de solidarité active (RSA), a new system that aimed to solve the poverty trap by providing low-wage workers a complementary income to encourage activity.

=== Germany ===
Social assistance is a state-provided social benefit within the social security system that functions as a basic safety net. Its purpose is to enable eligible individuals to lead a life consistent with human dignity.

=== Greece ===
The minimum guaranteed income is a selective financial benefit to ensure that all citizens enjoy a minimum standard of living and cover their basic needs. In 2019 it was incorporated as a requirement in the Greek Constitution.

=== India ===
Modern independent India developed many means and livelihood tested cash transfer programs through Direct Benefit Transfer at both the federal and the state level. At the federal level, these include minimum income social pension programs such as National Social Assistance Scheme, guaranteed employment program like National Rural Employment Guarantee Act, 2005 or a disability aid like Deendayal Disabled Rehabilitation Scheme. At the state level, there can be additional minimum income programs, one such being "Laksmir Bhandar" run by the state of West Bengal that transfers a minimum aid to families without work in the state.

=== Ireland ===
In Ireland, €20 of earnings per day of permitted work (beneficiaries are allowed up to three days per week) is disregarded from employment income when calculating Jobseekers’ Allowance entitlement and deductions are calculated as 60 percent of earnings less this income disregard. In addition, the Part-time Job Incentive Scheme and Back to Work Family Dividend are fixed-duration payments offered to the long-term unemployed incentive moving into work. In return for relinquishing claims to primary assistance benefits, both schemes provide benefits for a fixed duration that are slightly lower than household GMI entitlements, but which are not tapered with employment income, subject to certain eligibility requirements. Ireland's relatively generous tapering system serves to smooth disincentives to increase income and work and contributes to their lower measured participation tax rates (PTRs) and marginal effective tax rates (METRs).

=== Israel ===
Income support benefits are paid to households who are unable to support themselves on their own. The full income support benefit is paid to those who are not capable of earning income from work and not eligible for other programs, while income supplements are paid to those whose income, either from work or other sources, is lower than the minimum income required for subsistence.

=== Italy ===
The citizens' income was a social welfare assistance program which was in effect between April 2019 and January 2024. Although its name recalls one of a universal basic income, this provision was actually a form of conditional and non-individual guaranteed minimum income.

=== Japan ===
Public assistance (Japanese: seikatsu hogo) is a public welfare system established by the national and local governments in Japan. It is designed to guarantee a minimum standard of living—one that is both healthy and cultured—for Japanese citizens who are unable to achieve such a standard even after fully utilizing all available assets, personal capabilities, and other resources; the system also aims to foster the self-reliance of its recipients.

=== Luxembourg ===
The Revenu d’inclusion sociale (REVIS) social inclusion income is paid by the National Solidarity Fund (Fonds national de solidarité, FNS).

=== Netherlands ===
Social assistance is government-provided support for individuals who lack sufficient means of subsistence.

=== Norway ===
Income support can be granted if the applicant has insufficient income and resources to live on and is not entitled to other social security benefits. Income support is paid by the Norwegian Labour and Welfare Administration.

=== Portugal ===
The Social Insertion Income is a benefit for combating poverty, enabling individuals and their families to obtain support adapted to their situation, facilitating the satisfaction of their basic needs and aiming to integrate them into work, society and the community.

=== Saudi Arabia ===
Saudi Arabia has a Citizen's Account Program which provides a basic income to registered citizens. In December 2017, immediately before the program began, more than 3.7 million households had registered, representing 13 million people, or more than half the population. As of 2013, between one fifth and one third of Saudi residents are estimated to be non-citizens.

=== Slovakia ===
Material need assistance (pomoc v hmotnej núdzi) includes one hot meal a day, essential clothing and shelter.

=== South Africa ===
The Social Relief of Distress grant (SRD) in South Africa is given to those whose monthly income falls short of the individual food poverty line, which is the minimal amount required to buy food that provides adequate calories for survival.

=== South Korea ===
Ministry of Health and Welfare introduced Basic Livelihood Security Program (BLSP) in 2000.

=== Spain ===
In Spain, the ingreso mínimo vital is an economic benefit guaranteed as part of the Social security in Spain. The IMV is defined as a "subjective right" and is intended to prevent poverty and social exclusion of people who live alone or integrated into a coexistence unit when they are in a situation of vulnerability due to lack of sufficient financial resources to cover their basic needs. The benefit, which is not fixed and varies depending on various factors, ranges between 462 and 1015 euros per month, is expected to cover 850,000 households (approximately 2.5 million people) and will cost the government 3 billion euros per year.

=== Sweden ===
Social assistance consists partly of a "national standard" (riksnorm) and partly of "reasonable costs outside the national standard". The national standard includes costs such as food, clothing and footwear. Reasonable non-standard costs include rent and household electricity.

=== Switzerland ===
Social assistance acts as a non-contributory, needs-based safety net designed to guarantee a "dignified existence" to any person residing in the country who is unable to support themselves.

=== Taiwan ===
The Social Assistance Act, revised and renamed in 1980, became the foundation of the nation's social assistance system.

=== United Kingdom ===
Universal Credit is a United Kingdom–based social security payment. It is means-tested and is replacing and combining six benefits.

=== United States ===
The United States has multiple social programs that provide guaranteed minimum incomes for individuals meeting certain criteria such as assets or disability. For instance, Supplemental Security Income (SSI) is a United States government program that provides stipends to low-income people who are either aged (65 or older), blind, or disabled. SSI was created in 1974 to replace federal-state adult assistance programs that served the same purpose. Today the program provides benefits to approximately eight million Americans. Another such program is Social Security Disability Insurance (SSD or SSDI), a payroll tax-funded, federal insurance program. It is managed by the Social Security Administration and is designed to provide income supplements to people who are restricted in their ability to work because of a disability, usually a physical disability. SSD can be supplied on either a temporary or permanent basis, usually directly correlated to whether the person's disability is temporary or permanent.

An early guaranteed minimum income program in the U.S. was the Aid to Families with Dependent Children (AFDC), established by the Social Security Act. Where previously the responsibility to assist needy children lay in the hands of the states, AFDC transferred that authority to the federal government. Over time, the AFDC was often criticized for creating disincentives to work, leading to many arguing for its replacement. In the 1970s, President Richard M. Nixon proposed the Family Assistance Program (FAP), which would replace the AFDC. FAP was intended to fix many of the problems of the AFDC, particularly the anti-work structure. Presidential nominee George McGovern also proposed a minimum income—in the form of a Universal Tax Credit. Ultimately, neither of these programs was implemented. Throughout the decade, many other experimental minimum income programs were carried out in cities throughout the country, such as the Seattle-Denver Income Maintenance Experiments. In 1996, under President Bill Clinton, the AFDC was replaced with the Temporary Assistance for Needy Families program. This would block grant funds to the states to allow them to decide how aid would be distributed.

Another guaranteed minimum income program in the U.S. is the Earned Income Tax Credit. This is a refundable tax credit that gives poorer families cash assistance every year. The EITC avoids the welfare trap by subsidizing income, rather than replacing it.

=== Other countries ===
- Armenia: Vulnerability allowance
- Azerbaijan: Targeted state social assistance
- Bulgaria: Social benefits
- Croatia: Guaranteed minimum fee
- Czech Republic: State social assistance benefit
- Georgia: Subsistence allowance
- Iceland: Financial assistance
- Latvia: Social assistance
- Lithuania: Monetary social support
- Malawi: Social cash transfer programme
- Malaysia: Federal general assistance
- New Zealand: Emergency benefit
- Romania: Guaranteed minimum income
- Slovenia: Cash social assistance
- Thailand: State welfare card
- United Arab Emirates: Social welfare
- Uruguay: Uruguay social card

== List of countries ==
The following is a list of countries by guaranteed minimum income. The data are sourced from the OECD, and are expressed as a percentage of the national median disposable income.

Guaranteed minimum income (2018/19)
Country	Single person, no children (%)	Single person, 2 children (%)
Australia	34	44
Austria	42	47
Belgium	40	46
Bulgaria	12	23
Canada	21	37
Chile	4	14
Croatia	23	36
Cyprus	43	41
Czech Republic	22	29
Denmark	62	60
Estonia	28	37
Finland	53	49
France	39	46
Germany	44	51
Greece	27	27
Hungary	14	19
Iceland	50	43
Ireland	59	50
Israel	21	36
Italy	12	14
Japan	64	73
Latvia	22	29
Lithuania	18	41
Luxembourg	40	46
Malta	69	54
Netherlands	60	49
New Zealand	36	41
Norway	38	37
Poland	27	52
Portugal	21	31
Romania	9	27
Slovakia	15	21
Slovenia	36	55
South Korea	32	46
Spain	28	26
Sweden	47	39
Switzerland	48	44
Turkey	0	0
United Kingdom	54	57
United States	6	19

== See also ==
=== Topics ===
- Community cohesion
- Constitutional economics
- Cost of living
- Guaranteed Annual Income
- Guaranteed Income Supplement
- Guaranteed Minimum Pension
- Job guarantee
- Living wage
- Social credit
- Social dividend
- Solidarity
- Universal basic income
- Wage slavery

=== Countries ===
- Belgium: Integration income, Living wage
- Cuba: Economy of Cuba
- Germany: Hartz concept, Social assistance
- Hungary: Social institutions
- Netherlands: Participation Act
- Poland: Permanent benefit
- Switzerland: Social assistance
- United States: Homelessness
