= Health care in Saudi Arabia =

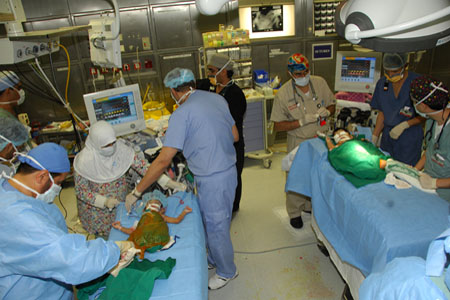
Saudi twins receiving care from doctors at King Abdulaziz Medical City in Riyadh

Health care in Saudi Arabia is a national health care system in which the government provides free universal healthcare coverage through a number of government agencies. There is also a growing role and increased participation from the private sector in the provision of health care services.

== Ministry of Health ==
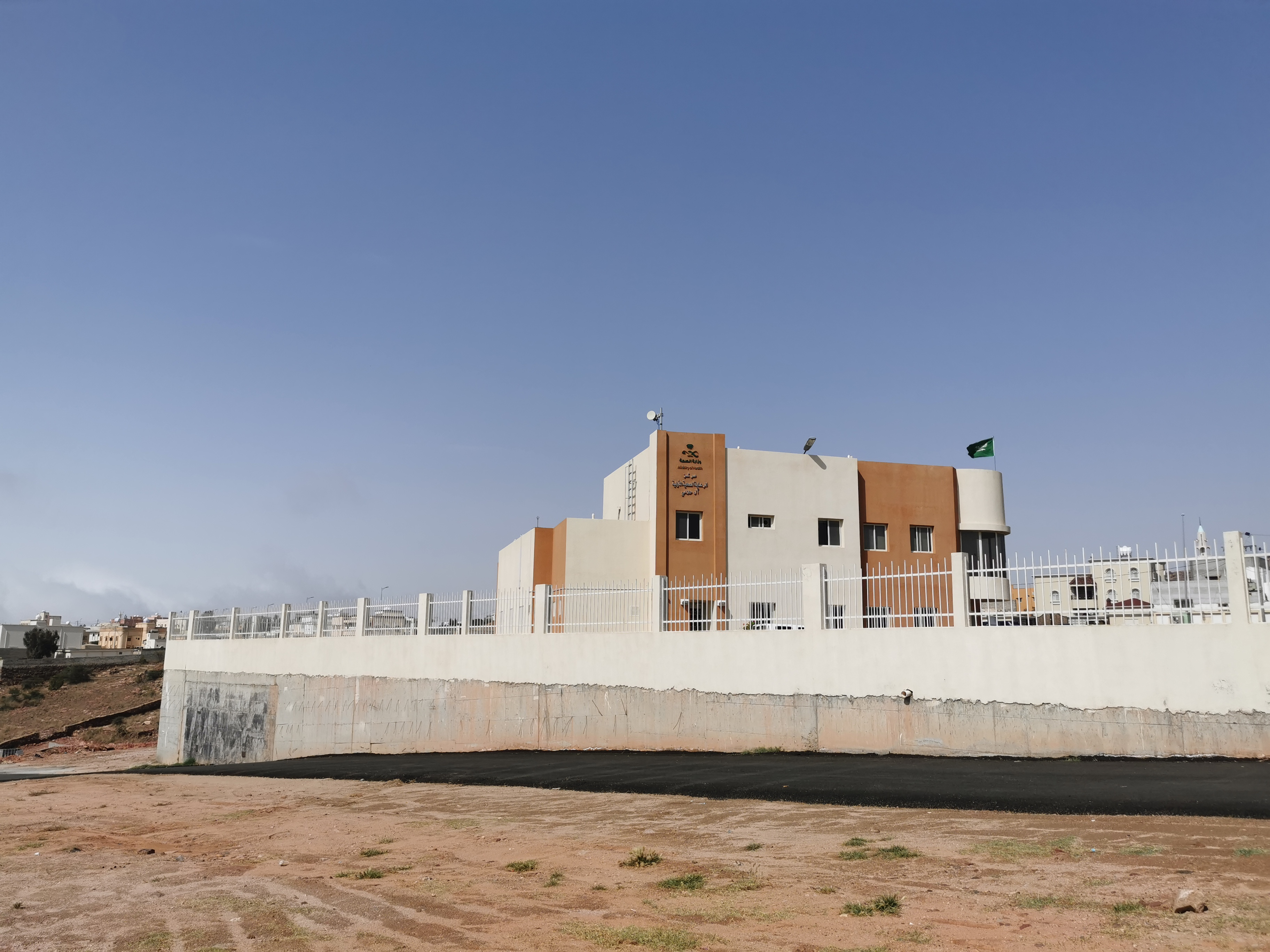
A governmental PHC in Abha

The Ministry of Health is the major government agency entrusted with the provision of preventive, curative and rehabilitative health care for the Kingdom's population. The Ministry provides primary health care services through a network of healthcare centers (comprising 1,925 centers) throughout the kingdom. It also adopts the referral system which provides curative care for all members of society from the level of general practitioners at health centers to advanced technology specialist curative services through a broad base of general and specialist hospitals (220 hospitals). The ministry is the lead Government agency responsible for the management, planning, financing and regulating of the health care sector. It also undertakes the overall supervision and follow-up of health care related activities carried out by the private sector.

There are also three other mini-NHS which finance and deliver primary, secondary and tertiary care to specific enrolled security and armed forces populations: the Ministry of Defense and Aviation, the Ministry of Interior and the Saudi Arabian National Guard. In addition to these agencies, there are several autonomous government agencies which are responsible for the delivery and financing of health care services in the kingdom. The Ministry of Education provides immediate primary health care to students. The Ministry of Labor and Social Affairs operates institutions for the mentally ill and custodial homes for orphans. These facilities provide their guests a certain amount of medical care. The General Organization for Social Insurance and General Presidency of Youth Welfare provide health services for certain categories of the population in connection with its management of sport facilities. The Royal Commission for Jubail and Yanbu provides health facilities for employees and residents at the two industrial cities (Jubail and Yanbu). The Saudi Arabian Airlines operates its own health care facilities with the aim of providing health care services to its employees. The Kingdom's universities provide, through their medical colleges or hospitals, specialist curative services and medical education and training programs, while they also conduct health research in collaboration with other research centers.

The Government also finances and provides care on a referral basis in its major specialized national tertiary care referral hospitals King Faisal Specialist Hospital and Research Center and King Khalid Eye Specialist Hospital. The King Faisal Specialist Hospital and Research Center uses highly advanced technologies and act as a reference hospital for cases that require advanced and specialist treatment, while it also conducts research on health issues in general and those related to the Kingdom in particular. The King Khalid Eye Specialist Hospital is designed to be a large health facility offering high quality specialized services for optometry, ophthalmology, eye surgery and medicine as well as being a regional research center in the area of ophthalmology. The hospital also has a cornea bank in which imported corneas are stored.

The ministry maintains the Saudi Health Office in London.

=== Budget ===
Budget allocated to the health sector by the Ministry of Health was in:

- 1956: 39,549,458 SR
- 1958: 68,480,000 SR
- 1960: 116,395,000 SR
- 2009: 40.43 billion SR
- 2010: 61.2 billion SR
- 2011: 68.7 billion SR

=== Private sector ===
The private sector provides health services through its health facilities including hospitals, dispensaries, laboratories, pharmacies and physiotherapy centers throughout the kingdom. Provision by the private sector at the end of the year 2000:

- 100 hospitals with 8,485 beds, accounting for about 19 percent of the total number of hospitals beds in the kingdom.
- 622 dispensaries, 785 clinics, 45 medical laboratories and 11 physiotherapy centers.
- 273 pharmaceutical stores and 3,209 pharmacies.
- Increased investments in manufacturing of drugs and medical supplies of medical appliances, and pharmaceuticals, in addition to the operation of some governmental hospitals and maintenance and cleaning in all health facilities.
- Increased contribution of the private sector in the provision of health care services, where out-patient visits increased from 12.1% of total out-patient visits in 1994 to 16.1% in 1998. In-patients in the Kingdom's private hospitals rose from 16.6% in 1994 to 27.1% in 1998.

Foreign investment in health is subject to the Private Health Institutes Law. Until 2019 this only permitted foreign ownership of hospitals, but now any kind of healthcare facility can be owned by foreign investors.

== Benefits ==
Saudis and public sector expatriates are eligible for a comprehensive package of benefits including, public health, preventive, diagnostic, and curative services and pharmaceuticals with few exclusions and no cost sharing. Most services including state of the art cardio-vascular procedures, organ transplants, and cancer treatments (including bone marrow transplants) are covered. Sponsors/employers are responsible for paying for an extensive package of services for private sector expatriates.

== History ==
Historical development of life expectancy in Saudi Arabia

Government prioritization of preventive healthcare and environmental health began in 1925 following the establishment a public health department. The decision to create it came after a royal decree from King Abdul Aziz Al-Saud. By 1926, the first school of nursing was opened, followed by the school of health and emergencies in 1927.

Health services expanded in 1951 with the establishment of the Ministry of Health. A ministerial ordinance in 1980 led to a conglomeration of the administration of the existing dispensaries, health centers, health offices and maternal and child health centers into one unit. By the end of the 1980s, there were 253 hospitals, 38,955 hospital beds and 1,640 primary health centers. The proportion of positions filled by Saudi nationals was low, with Saudi nationals representing 13% doctors (22,633 doctors), 11.2% nurses (45,840 nurses) and 38% health technicians (25,192 health technicians). In 1993, the total number of hospitals was 281, 41,789 hospital beds and 1,707 primary health centers and the positions filled by Saudi nationals increased to 22.7% doctors, 24.5% nursing staff and 41.8% health technicians.

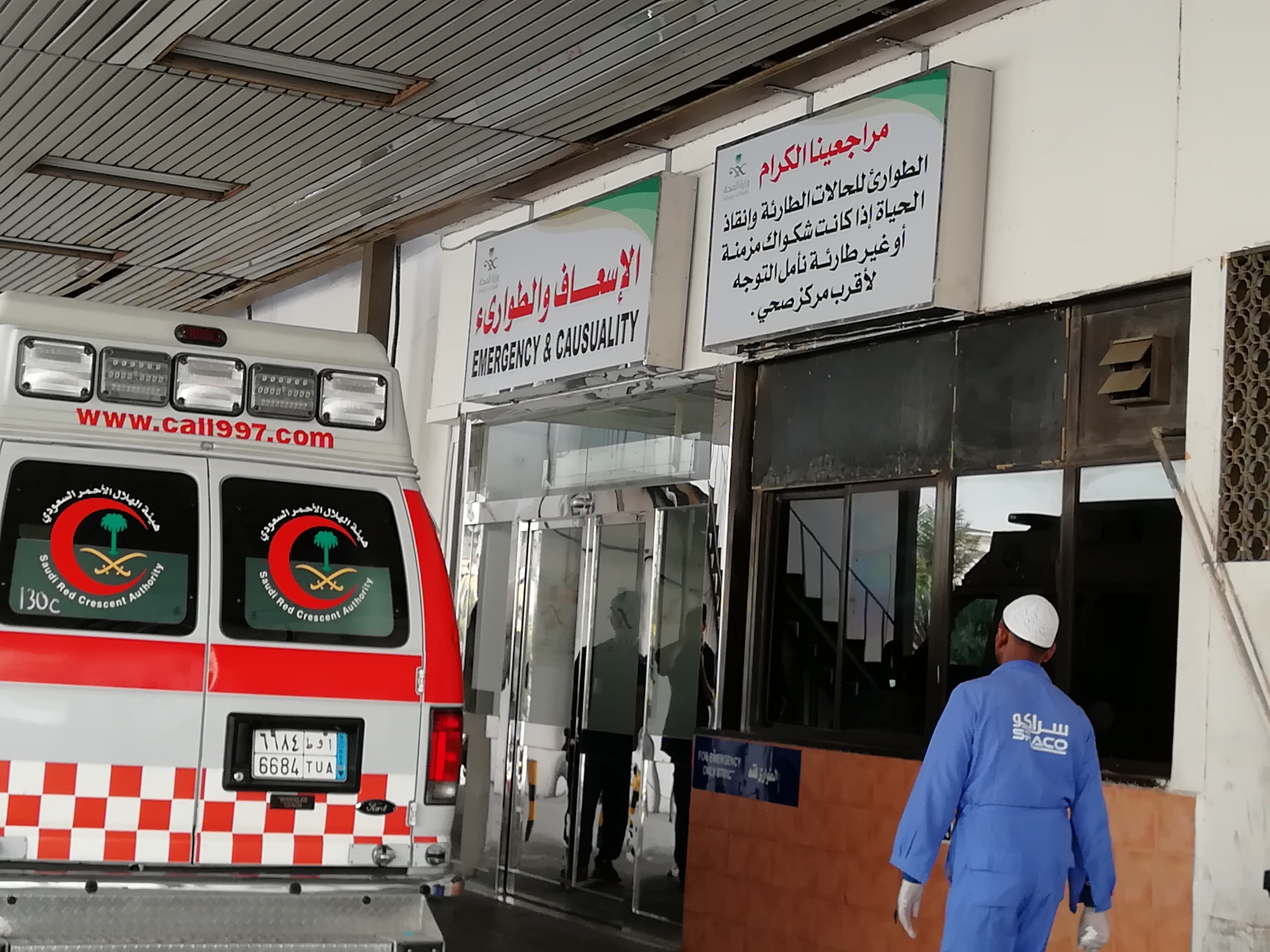
A Saudi Red Crescent ambulance in front of the emergency room

In 2002, the Saudi health system was established by a Royal decree to insure the provision of comprehensive health care to the population of Saudi Arabia in a fair minded, affordable manner. In 2004, there were 1,848 primary health care centers and 200 hospitals. The Ministry of Health budget increased from 2.8% of the total National budget in 1970 to 6.4% in 2004. In 2006, there were 20.4 doctors and 35.4 nurses per 10,000 population. In 2008 there were 1925 health care centers throughout the kingdom and 220 hospitals which adopted the referral system which provided curative care for all members of society from the level of general practitioners at health care centers to antecedent technology specialist curative services through a broad base of general and specialist hospitals.

=== Government hospitals in Riyadh (public hospitals) ===
- King Khaled Eye Specialist Hospital
- King Faisal Specialist Hospital and Research Center - Founded in 1975, and specialized in incurable diseases, which can not be treated in other centers and the hospital has a section of equipment containing all types of diagnostic radiology such as MRI, CT scan.
- Mental Health Hospital - Overseeing the cases outside the hospital and it consists of three parts, interior and outpatient clinics and ambulance 24 hours as there is in the hospital pharmacy and laboratory.
- King Fahad Medical City in Riyadh city

=== Introduction of health insurance ===
In 2005, health insurance was made compulsory for all non-Saudi nationals working in the country under the Cooperative Health Insurance Act. In 2008, this act was extended to include Saudi nationals working for the private sector. Enforcement of this compulsory coverage include fines for non-compliant companies and a refusal to renew working permits without insurance.

== See also ==
- Health in Saudi Arabia
- Saudi Ministry of Health
- Saudi Commission for Health Specialties
- Saudi Arabia
- Arabian Shield Cooperative Insurance Company
- Obesity in Saudi Arabia
- Disability in Saudi Arabia
- Saudi Red Crescent Authority
- List of hospitals in Saudi Arabia
