= CFB Rivers =

Former Royal Canadian Air Force base in Manitoba

CFB Rivers / RCAF Station Rivers
- Near Rivers, Manitoba in Canada

Site information
- Owner: Department of National Defence
- Operator: Royal Canadian Air Force
- Controlled by: No. 2 Training Command RCAF (1940-1945)

Location
- Coordinates: 50°00′38″N 100°18′49″W

Garrison information
- Garrison: No. 1 ANS (1940–1942); No. 1 CNS (1942–1945)

Airfield information
- Elevation: 1,550 ft (470 m) AMSL
Runways
Direction	Length and surface
8/26	3,300 ft (1,010 m) asphalt
12/30	3,270 ft (1,000 m) asphalt
3/21	3,270 ft (1,000 m) asphalt

CFB Rivers was a Royal Canadian Air Force base located 5 km (3.1 mi) southwest of Rivers, Manitoba (30 km or 19 mi northwest of Brandon), Canada, at the junction of Manitoba Highway 25 (PTH 25) and Manitoba Provincial Road 259 (PR 259).

== History ==
=== 1940–1945 - World War II ===
RCAF Station Rivers was opened 23 November 1940, when No. 1 Air Navigation School (No. 1 ANS) was relocated to the Station, from RCAF Station Trenton, Ontario. On 11 May 1942, No. 1 Air Navigation School was redesignated No. 1 Central Navigation School (No. 1 CNS) and remained at RCAF Station Rivers until it was disbanded on 15 September 1945. No. 1 Air Navigation School and No. 1 Central Navigation Schools were both part of No. 2 Training Command RCAF one of the 4 commands responsible for administration of the British Commonwealth Air Training Plan (BCATP).

=== Aerodrome information ===
In 1944 the aerodrome was listed at 50°01′N 100°19′W with a variation of 14 degrees east and altitude of 1,550 ft (470 m). Three runways were listed as follows:

Runway Name	Length	Width	Surface
8/26	3,300 ft (1,010 m)	150 ft (46 m)	Asphalt
12/30	3,270 ft (1,000 m)	150 ft (46 m)	Asphalt
3/21	3,270 ft (1,000 m)	150 ft (46 m)	Asphalt

=== 1945–1971 - Post war ===
The base remained open after the war, becoming a training centre for Canadian Army pilots and flying instructors from the army, Royal Canadian Navy and Royal Canadian Air Force. Additionally, the Air Dispatch School made Rivers its home.

Other post-war units stationed at Rivers included the Canadian Parachute Training Centre, the Army Aviation Tactical Training School, the Joint Air Photo Interpretation School, the Basic Helicopter Training Unit and the Army Air Tactical Training School (AATTS). The Royal Canadian Navy began sending trainees to Rivers after the closure of their own training facility at CFB Shearwater, Nova Scotia. Units based at the station included the Air Support Signal Unit, No. 1 Transport Helicopter Platoon (No. 1 THP), The Canadian Airborne Regiment and 408 Squadron. As a result of the unification of the Canadian Armed Forces, RCAF Station Rivers was renamed CFB Rivers.

=== 1971–Present ===
The station closed in 1971. That same year, the Oo-za-we-kwun Centre opened on the former base to provide vocational training for Canadian First Nations people, and closed in 1980. In 1982, the base was used for General Military Training (GMT). Future Air Reserve members trained in CFB Rivers for two months. A hog farm called Aero Farms Ltd, operated from the site until 2011. The site sat vacant, with remaining buildings rapidly crumbling. The airfield is marked as abandoned by the Canada Flight Supplement. Some scenes for the 1993 film For the Moment, about an Australian pilot who comes to Manitoba to train under the BCATP, starring Russell Crowe, were filmed at the former air base.

It currently is owned by a local family. The airfield is used for personal use, such as spraying crops or recreational flights. Some renovations were completed on old buildings such as the hangar, though the rest were left to deteriorate. Several houses, an old swimming pool, the barracks, and more remain.

== Notable members ==
- 'Harlo "Terry" Taerum' - A RCAF navigator who was a member of the famous "Dambusters" (No. 617 Squadron RAF). Taerum, trained at Rivers and received his navigator's wing from Air vice-marshal Billy Bishop. In May 1943, in Operation Chastise, commonly known as the "Dambusters Raid," he successfully navigated the lead Avro Lancaster bomber (piloted by Guy Gibson), at night and at very low level, to its target, a German power dam. Raised on a farm near Milo, Alberta. He was killed on a later raid, in September 1943.
