= Ontario Basic Income Pilot Project =

2018–2019 project in Ontario, Canada

The Ontario Basic Income Pilot Project was a pilot project to provide basic income to 4,000 people in Ontario, Canada. The project followed recommendations made by Hugh Segal in consultation with the population, and would test whether "Basic Income [would] reduce poverty more effectively, encourage work, reduce stigmatization, and produce better health outcomes and better life chances for recipients". It was then implemented in 2018 by the Ontario Liberal Party. However, the project was terminated early by a newly elected Progressive Conservative government, and the final payments were made to participants in March 2019.

== Description ==
The pilot project aimed to give a fixed income for three years to people with low or no incomes.

The communities served by the pilot project included Hamilton, Brantford, Thunder Bay and Lindsay. Participants of the project were randomly selected among residents of the regions aged 18–64. The financial threshold for inclusion was $34,000 per year for singles or $48,000 per year for couples. About 70% of participants were already employed when entering the program. Single participants received up to $16,989 a year while couples received up to $24,027. If participants also received a paid salary, the amount of basic income would be reduced by 50 cents for every dollar of earned income." Therefore a (single) participant with a salary of $10,000 per year would receive a basic income of $5,000 less ($11,989 per year).

Those participants receiving either Employment Insurance or Canada Pension Plan would have their Basic Income reduced on a dollar for dollar basis. Those with disabilities would also receive up to $500 per month on top, but they would withdraw from their participation in the Ontario Works or the Ontario Disability Support Program. Seniors (those 65 years and over) were not included and they could continue to claim existing benefits.

In addition to the 4,000 participants, a comparison group was selected, who would not receive the basic income. However, they would still be asked questions on various issues including their health, work situation and housing. This was to allow researchers to compare the effects of those receiving basic income with those not receiving it.

== Early project cancellation ==
10 months after the Liberal administration started distributing payments, the early cancellation of the project was announced (in August 2018) by the Progressive Conservative government. Minister of Children and Youth Services Lisa MacLeod said the decision was taken due to high costs, and because ministry staff indicated that "the program didn't help people become 'independent contributors' to the economy." McLeod added that the project did not align with the government of Doug Ford desire to move people from welfare to jobs. The Progressive Conservatives had earlier promised to maintain the project.

Anti-poverty groups were "stunned" by the decision to discontinue the project. The Ontario Coalition Against Poverty declared that the decision "demonstrates a reckless disregard for the lives of nearly 4,000 people." Local politicians in Hamilton passed a resolution "denouncing" discontinuation of the program. One writer went as far to say that the study was being ended early due to fears that the results would show that the program worked.

Researchers were also dismayed by the decision. According to those studying the effect of the pilot project, effective interventions for individuals suffering poverty and insecurity as a result of low-paid or precarious employment can be challenging; researcher Kwame McKenzie noted that it is not easy to get 6,000 people to participate in a study. Ending the study early will make it difficult to gather conclusive data regarding the research goal of determining "what happens when low-wage, precarious workers receive a financial top-up."

=== Project Findings ===
Although the project finished early, there was still much discussion and analysis of the benefits and challenges of the pilot. Anecdotal reports in the press indicated that entrepreneurship was not a goal for participants, although one report described a couple who kept their existing business afloat with the program's payments. Other journalistic reports tended to focus on non-entrepreneurial participant outcomes contributing to personal stability, such as augmenting disability payments, paying for education and student loans, purchasing new eyeglasses while remaining in a low-paid museum job, paying for transportation costs (such as bus fare to work rather than walking for an hour and a half), and purchasing necessary items like fresh produce, hospital parking passes, "winter clothes they couldn't [previously] afford and staying warm", etc.

More formal research was undertaken by two sociologists. They undertook qualitative interviews with a small sample of project members who specifically wished to articulate their reflections on receiving basic income. The researchers identified four themes from these interviews: "1) a desire among participants to work and be financially independent, 2) traditional welfare payments are extremely low and do not cover basic necessities, while basic income is higher and does cover these necessities, 3) beyond the basic differences in benefit amount, the conditional nature of traditional welfare programs has significant repercussions for recipients, and 4) basic income has facilitated long-term financial planning." The second and third themes were particularly pertinent. Participants reported that their nutrition improved, stress levels lowered, relationships improved and could escape from living in sub-standard housing.

The unconditional nature of the scheme also had significant advantages, especially when compared with the Ontario Works welfare program or the Ontario Disability Support Program. With the basic income, bureaucratic confusion was removed, the intrusive nature of means testing was no longer present, the ability to keep earned income helped maintain the incentive to work and financial planning became possible.

== See also ==
- Poverty in Ontario
- Mincome
- Basic income in Canada
