= Citizen's Account Program (Saudi Arabia) =

Government cash transfer program

The Citizen's Account Program in Saudi Arabia is a cash transfer program that started in December 2017. The program is adopted and implemented by the Ministry of Labor and Social Development. Through the programme, citizens in Saudi Arabia receive monthly payments from the state.

Through the National Transformation Program, Saudi Arabia is undertaking reforms to reduce the country's dependency on oil revenues. The Citizen's Account, which is a form of basic income, is intended to soften the impacts that these reforms have on some citizens, to avoid overburdening lower income families with otherwise higher prices for oil, fuel and energy. This financial support comes as a response to the increase the costs of electricity and petrol as well as the imposing of VAT on many products.

In December 2017, immediately before the programme began, more than 3.7 million households had registered, representing 13 million people, or more than half the population. As of 2013, between 1/5 and 1/3 of Saudi residents are estimated to be non-citizens.

As of March 2021, the programme has paid out over £400,000,000.

== Program objectives ==
- Developing the services given to citizens
- Improving the government's expenditure and operation efficiency
- Providing assistance to citizens with a high level of transparency and efficiency

== See also ==
- Economy of Saudi Arabia
- Guaranteed minimum income
