= Deendayal Disabled Rehabilitation Scheme =

Deendayal Disabled Rehabilitation Scheme (DDRS) has been launched by the Department of Empowerment of Persons with Disabilities, Ministry of Social Justice and Empowerment, Government of India, with an aim to provide equal level of opportunity, social justice, equality and empowerment to disabled people. For the overall empowerment of PwDs, a regional conference on Deendayal Disabled Rehabilitation Scheme (DDRS) was organized by the department responsible for the empowerment of persons with disabilities under the Ministry of Social Justice and Empowerment

Under this scheme, with the help of Self Help Groups (NGOs), disability is identified and provided in the form of assistance from the schools itself, so that they can face the difficulties in life and face them easily. Along with this, cooperation is also provided in different situations of life, so that even a disabled person can live a normal life.

The Central Sector Scheme, also known as the "Scheme for Promoting Voluntary Action for the Disabled", was amended in 2003 and renamed DDRS.The vision of the scheme is to provide a full range of services needed for rehabilitation of PwD to voluntary organizations. Recommendation from the District Social Welfare Officer and the State Government is necessary for issuing grants-in-aid to NGOs.
