= Julaybib =

Figure from early Islam

Religious life
- Religion: Islam

Julaybib was a companion of the Islamic prophet Muhammad and martyr in the early Muslim community.

== Name ==
His name was acquired prior to his acceptance of Islam, and its meaning is uncertain. It has been explained as a diminutive of jalbab, and some have linked it to his short stature, while others have suggested it referred to his skin color/appearance. According to Islamic scholar Omar Suleiman, the name was not a derogatory one: Muhammad PBUH is reported to have changed names that carried negative meanings, yet he did not change this name, which Suleiman takes as proof that it was not offensive.

== Family ==
Julaybib's lineage was unknown and there is no record of his parents or what tribe he belonged to. All that was known of him was that he was an Arab and that he was one of the Ansar in Medina.

=== Marriage ===
Muhammad suggested Julaybib as a match for a woman from the Ansar known for her beauty, modesty, and devotion. While the girl's parents—particularly the mother—were unsatisfied with the proposal at first, the daughter willingly consented and was married to Julaybib. The account is narrated by Abu Barza al-Aslami and is also found in the Musnad of Ahmad ibn Hanbal. The couple was about to live together until he was martyred in an expedition soon after. It is said that Julaybib's wife was the most eligible unmarried woman in Medina.

== Martyrdom ==
Soon after his marriage, Julaybib participated in a military expedition with Muhammad and was martyred.

A hadith found in Sahih Muslim, narrated by Abu Barza al-Aslami, reports that after the expedition when accounting for missing persons, Muhammad ordered a search for Julaybib. He was found lying next to seven enemies he had slain in the battle before being killed. When he was found, Muhammad said, "He is from me and I am from him," and then he lifted Julaybib's body himself. A grave was dug and he was buried; the narration does not mention the body being washed. Some sources in the Islamic tradition report that the sky was filled with thousands of angels who had come to participate in his funeral.

== See also ==
- Salaf
- Sahaba
