= National Transformation Program (Saudi Arabia) =

Saudi Arabian economic action plan

The National Transformation Program (NTP) is an economic action plan put in place by the government of Saudi Arabia as part of its Vision 2030 development plan. This plan comes in the framework of the Saudi efforts to diversify its economic income away from the oil industry.

== History ==
Low oil prices cut Saudi Arabia's government revenue in half since 2013. In addition to adapting to lower budgets, the government had to respond to rising demand for housing, education, electricity and water. Crown prince of Saudi Arabia Mohammad bin Salman launched the National Transformation Program to fulfill part of the goals set by the Vision 2030 program.

On 22 December 2016, the Saudi government announced the NTP's Citizen’s Account Program, an update to the method of offering government subsidies for gasoline, electricity and high-cost living allowances to low and average income groups. As of March 2017, over 3 million Saudi families had registered for the program.

== Role ==
The National Transformation Program is an action plan put in place by the Saudi government to diminish the country’s economic dependence on oil. This five-year plan has three strategic objectives: public sector & fiscal reforms, economic diversification & enhancing the business environment and social reforms. The program implement 543 initiatives across 24 ministries and government bodies.

The goal of the NTP is to increase the country's non-oil government revenue from SR163 billion to SR600 billion by 2020, increase the contribution from the private sector from 40% to 65% of GDP, and to expand the share of non-oil exports in non-oil GDP from 16% to 50%. Oil output capacity is expected to stay at 12.5 million barrels per day by 2020. The NTP aims to bring down unemployment by 12% with the creation of 450,000 jobs in the non-government sector.
