= Health in Saudi Arabia =

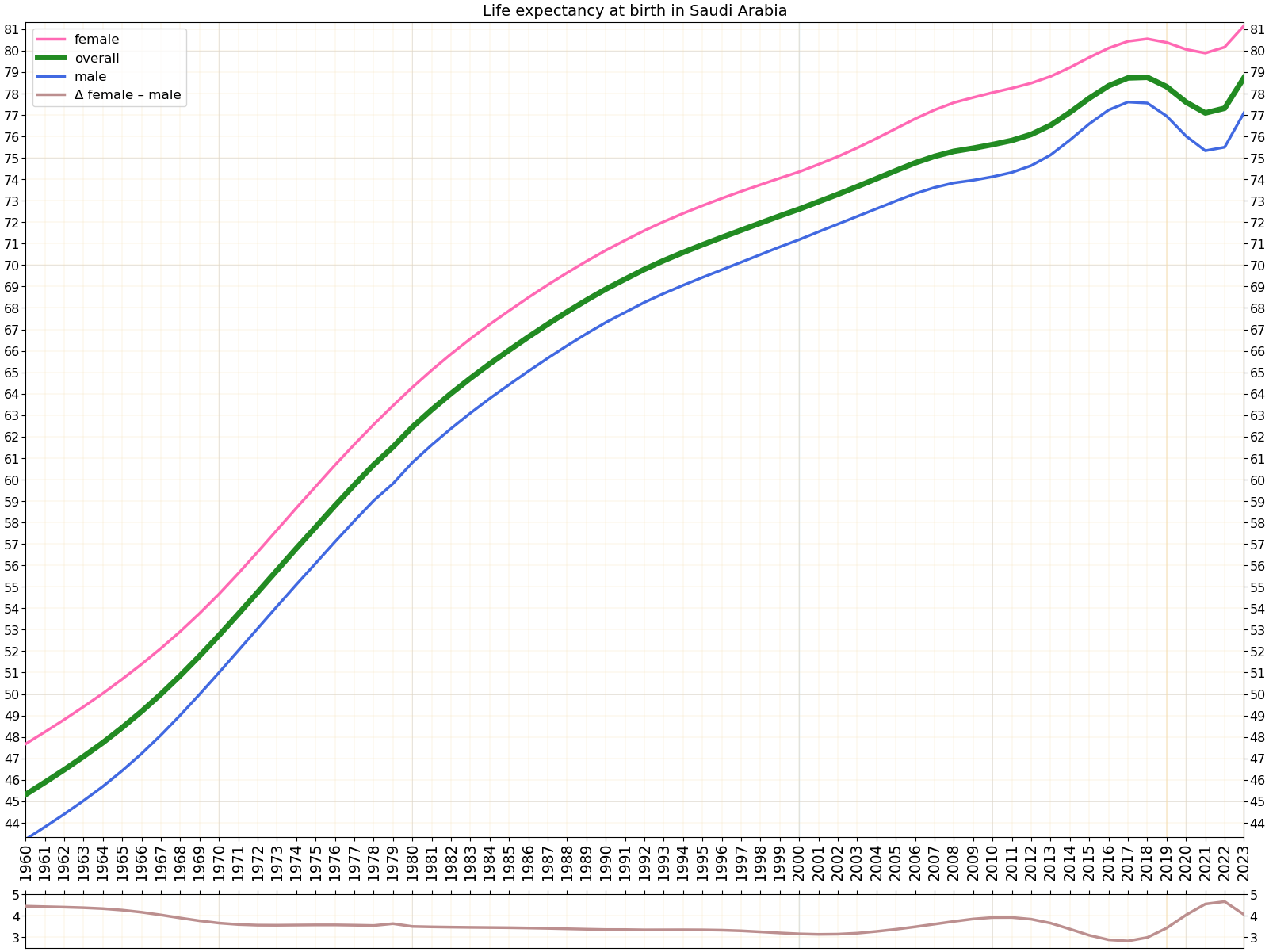
Life expectancy in Saudi Arabia

Health in Saudi Arabia refers to the overall health of the population of Saudi Arabia. Government prioritization of preventive healthcare and environmental health began in 1925 following the establishment of a public health department. The decision to create it came after a royal decree from King Abdul Aziz Al-Saud. The government announced plans to increase taxes on soft drinks and tobacco in December 2015.

== Obesity ==
Across the whole population from 1995 to 2000, 36.9% were overweight and 35.6% were obese. Rates were high amongst children aged 5–17, as 16.7% of boys and 19.4% of girls were overweight. By 2006, 52% of men, 66% of women, 18% of teenagers, and 15% of preschoolers were overweight or obese.

In 2008, 17.99% of deaths were caused by cardiovascular disease. During this year, 95% of the 424,968 total appointments to diabetics clinics were made for Saudi citizens. 55% of these diabetic citizens were women and 44% were men.

The latest national prevalence for childhood obesity (ages 5 to 18) in Saudi Arabia reported: 23.1% were overweight, 9.3% were obese and 2% were severely obese (2%) (El-Mouzan et al., 2010).

Part of the reason for the high rate of overweight and obesity within the population are urban residents that consume hypercaloric foods while maintaining a sedentary lifestyle. The less-than physically demanding lifestyle urban residents lead is linked to a high level of education and income. In addition, women had an increased risk of obesity because of cultural and religious beliefs that require women to stay at home as a housewife. Women are prohibited from using hotel gyms and pools and are targets of harassment when they exercise publicly. This is based on the belief that giving women the freedom to exercise would lead to the corruption and decline of the nation. In schools, physical activity for girls is avoided because some fear that changing clothes outside of the home would cause girls to lose their shyness, an admirable moral quality.

As part of WHO's goal to eradicate the use of synthetic trans fats by 2023, Saudi Arabia has taken a serious measures to reduce trans fat in food industry. In a similar context, Saudi Arabia has imposed 50% tax on soft drinks.

== Smoking ==
In June 2010, the Council of Ministers urged the General Authority of Civil Aviation (GACA) to restrict smoking at all airports and their facilities in the Kingdom, and strict rules were imposed. It also advised GACA to impose a fine of SR200 (US$53) on people who violate the new regulations. Many commercial buildings and work places banned smoking at offices in an attempt to stop smoking in public places. In addition, King Fahd University of Petroleum and Minerals in Dhahran launched a program in 2010 to make their university smoke-free, and Umm al-Qura University in Mecca launched a campaign with the same title in 2011. In May 2012, King Faisal Specialist Hospital and Research Centre in Riyadh banned people from smoking in and around its buildings, the first such move in the country. The hospital implemented fines of SR200 for violations.

On 30 July 2012, Interior Minister Prince Ahmed bin Abdulaziz ordered the implementation of a royal ban on smoking in all government facilities (ministries, buildings, institutions, offices etc.) and most indoor public places. The ban also prohibits smoking of hookahs in public places, and prohibits selling tobacco to anyone under 18. On 1 December 2012, the Saudi Commission for Tourism & Antiquities (SCTA) imposed a ban on smoking in all tourism facilities.

In 2019, Saudi Arabia received an award for fighting and preventing smoking in the 72nd session of the World Health Assembly. Another decision was made in 2019 that charges restaurants and cafes selling tobacco products an annual amount of $26,675. It is worth mentioning that Saudi Arabia imposed a 100% tax on electronic cigarettes.

== Cancer prevention ==
In February 2019, Saudi Arabia announced that it is going to take serious measures to prevent cancer. In this context, Saudi Arabia aims to be a global leader in such a field, especially that cancer has become the first killer in the Middle East. Thus, the Saudi Ministry of Health is going to make a number of initiatives that include, implementing an advanced screening program, improving palliative care and developing awareness in health care.

== MERS-related coronavirus ==
Middle East respiratory syndrome (MERS) is a viral respiratory disease caused by Middle East respiratory syndrome coronavirus.(MERS‐CoV) that was first identified in Saudi Arabia in 2012. MERS or middle eastern respiratory syndrome related corona virus (MERS‐CoV) is a COVID-19 variant that effects primarily camels but can be transmitted to humans.

When infected with the MERS virus one can experience a range of symptoms. Some of these symptoms may include cough, fever and shortness of breath. If the infection is left untreated some patients can develop pneumonia or gastrointestinal symptoms such as diarrhea. Older and health compromised people are more susceptible and vulnerable to the virus. In addition to this, they are more likely to experience severe illness such as respiratory failure.

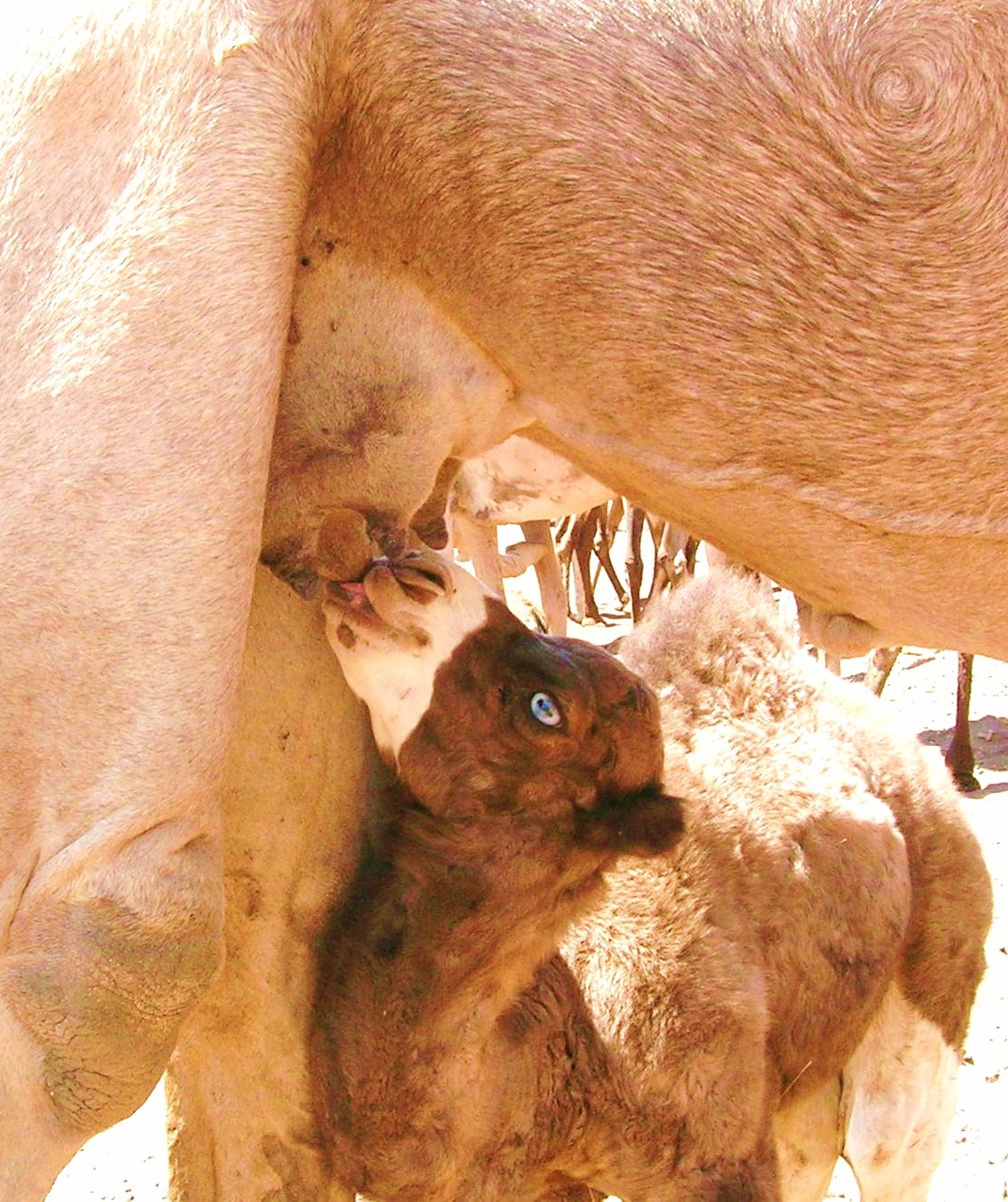
Camel with blue eyes suckeling from mother.

Transmission: MERS is a zoonotic virus, meaning it is transmitted between animals and people. The virus has primarily been transmitted by camel to camel. However, Centers for Disease Control and Prevention (CDC) list MERS as transmissible from human to human. Over 90% of adult dromedaries in the Arabian Peninsula have antibodies against MERS. Two humped camels in Mongolia and China as well as dromedaries in Australia do not have MERS antibodies and therefore have not been exposed to the virus. Some studies have shown that humans are infected through direct or indirect contact with infected dromedary camels. Even though the exact route of transmission remains unclear, It has been theorized that infected calf suckling its mother is a transmission point from animal to human. This is due to the young calf that may be clinically sick from MERS, leaving virus residue on the mother's udder. This can lead to contaminated milk and physical contamination of the hand of the milker.

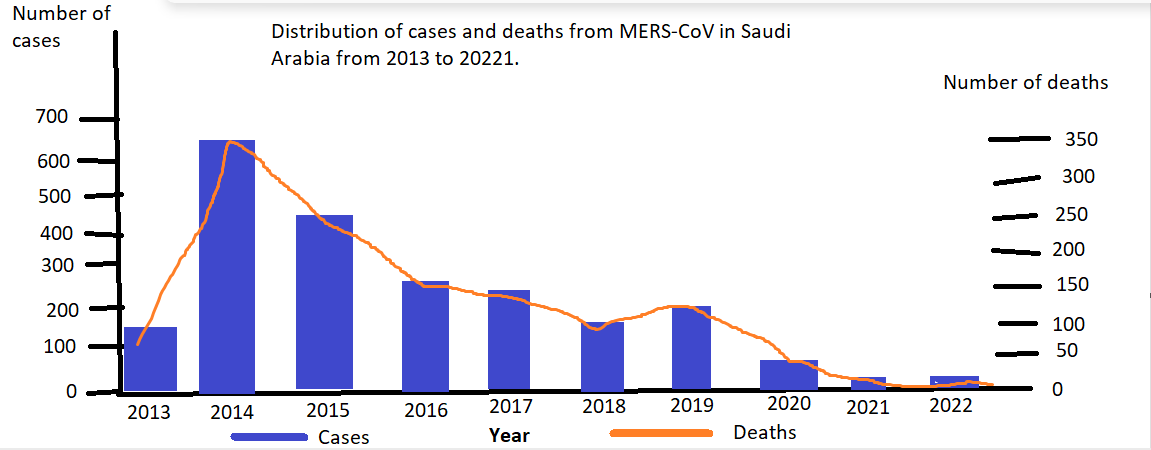
Distribution of cases and deaths from MERS-CoV in Saudi Arabia from 2013 to 2022

== See also ==
- Health care in Saudi Arabia
- COVID-19 pandemic in Saudi Arabia
