= China SCE Property =

Chinese property developer

China SCE Property Holdings Limited 中骏置业控股有限公司
- Company type: Privately held company
- Industry: Real estate
- Founded: 1995; 31 years ago
- Headquarters: Xiamen, Fujian, People's Republic of China
- Area served: People's Republic of China
- Key people: Chairman: Mr. Wong Chiu Yeung
- Website: www.sce-re.com

China SCE Property Holdings Limited (SEHK: 1966) is a privately held property developer headquartered in Xiamen, Fujian, China. It primarily focuses on high-end residential property development in the Western Taiwan Strait Economic Zone, including the greater metropolitan areas of Xiamen, Quanzhou and Zhangzhou, and Fuzhou.

It was listed on the Hong Kong Stock Exchange in 2010 with the IPO price of HK$2.6 per share.
