= Smoking in Saudi Arabia =

Smoking in Saudi Arabia is banned in airports, workplaces, universities, research centers, hospitals, government buildings, all public places, places involved with tourism, and in and around all places associated with religion, education, public events, sporting establishments, charity associations, all forms of public transport and their associated facilities, plants for manufacturing or processing items, and a large proportion of public places.

Statistics taken by the Ministry of Health in 2007 indicated that 75.4% of the population believed public smoking should be prohibited.

"Official figures" from 2012 indicate there were somewhere around six million smokers in the country, including eight hundred thousand students in intermediate and high school. Around one tenth of smokers were women.

A study conducted in 2009 found smoking in all age groups was widespread. The lowest median percentage of smokers was university students (~13.5%) while the highest was elderly people (~25%). The study also found the median percentage of male smokers to be much higher than that of females (~26.5% for males, ~9% for females).

== History ==
Before 2010, Saudi Arabia had no policies banning or restricting smoking.

In 2010, restrictions on smoking were imposed in airports and King Fahd University of Petroleum and Minerals.

In 2011, Umm al-Qura University also restricted smoking.

In 2012, smoking was banned in government buildings (both public and private) and in a majority of public places (only inside of buildings, not around them) by Prince Ahmad bin Abdulaziz. The same law also banned persons under the age of eighteen from purchasing tobacco products.

Later in the same year, all forms of smoking were banned in and around centers of tourism (hotels, travel agencies, etc.) by the Saudi Arabian General Commission for Tourism and Antiquities.

In 2016, smoking near places of religion (mosques), places of education, facilities pertaining to health or sports, processing/manufacturing plants, all forms of public transport, and charity institutions was banned. The new ban also clarified that smoking is not allowed in private or public governmental facilities. The decree from the Kingdom also urged bodies of government at all levels to make as great an effort as possible to prevent as much smoking as possible, including banning the farming and processing of tobacco. It also limited the options for selling tobacco: cigarettes must only be sold in packages and their sale is prohibited in facilities for public transport and all vending machines.

== Policies and bans ==
There were very few restrictions on smoking in Saudi Arabia before 2010. In 2010, the General Authority of Civil Aviation decided under support of the Council of Ministers to restrict smoking to designated areas in all airports and associated buildings in the Kingdom, as well as impose fines of at least 200 SAR (~$53 USD) on violators.

King Fahd University of Petroleum and Minerals began making efforts to ban smoking around the campus.

The next year, Umm al-Qura University also started to ban smoking on their campus.

King Faisal Specialist Hospital banned all smoking not only in their facilities, but also around them.

In 2016, smoking in and/or around places of worship and other institutions involved with sports, culture, education, health, social interaction, or charity was banned. Individuals found violating the ban receive a fine of between 200 SAR ($53 USD) and 5000 SAR ($1300 USD). The same decree applies to all forms of public transport (including facilities such as bus stations), and manufacturing/processing plants. Efforts are also being made towards "raise[ing] awareness on the harmful effects of smoking and tobacco products across the Kingdom." Also prohibited under the decree are the sale of tobacco (and related products) to persons under the age of eighteen years, creating any patents for products involving tobacco, selling tobacco or related products at a reduced price (this includes offering tobacco products as free samples; gifting tobacco is also prohibited), selling or importing any products with advertisements promoting tobacco in any form (not limited to cigarettes), the creation, selling, or import of any toys or foods resembling smoking devices or other tobacco related products. Violations of these restrictions attract a maximum fine of 20,000 SAR ($5300 USD).
