= Saudi Council of Engineers =

Professional regulatory body

- Nickname: SCE
- Formation: December 1, 2002; 23 years ago
- Headquarters: Riyadh, Saudi Arabia
- Region served: Saudi Arabia
- Chairman: Saad Al Shahrani
- Vice-Chairman: Hussein Al Shammari
- Parent organization: Ministry of Commerce and Investment
- Website: saudieng.sa

The Saudi Council of Engineers (SCE; Arabic: الهيئة السعودية للمهندسين) is a professional body intended to promote the engineering profession and develop and upgrade its standards and those practicing it. It operates under the supervision of Ministry of Commerce and Investment with headquarters in Riyadh.

== Overview and responsibilities ==
The council was established by a royal decree issued by the King Fahd bin Abdul Aziz Al Saud in 2002. The organization's stated responsibilities are:

- Setting criteria and standards
- Professional development
- Setting license terms and conditions
- Setting rules and regulations
- Conducting examinations for obtaining professional status

== Notable members ==
- Aseel Al-Hamad
- Fatmah Baothman (president of the Women Engineers Committee in the western region)

== See also ==
- Saudi Commission for Health Specialties
