= Scalable Cluster Environment =

OpenSCE (Open Scalable Cluster Environment) is an Open-source beowulf-clustering software suite led by Kasetsart University, Thailand. It started from a small system monitoring for cluster, called SCMS (Scalable Cluster Monitoring System) and extend from its base to many sub-project. Currently OpenSCE has the following components

== Components ==
- SCEBase - Core system library and command line
- SCMS (Scalable Cluster Monitoring System) - Cluster monitoring. Including some command line tools for cluster management
- SCMSWeb - Grid & Cluster web-base monitoring system
- MPITH - A thin layer of MPI that focus on light & robust implementation
- MPView - A visual profiling and debugger for parallel program
- OpenSCE Roll - A bundled of components to install in a NPACI Rocks cluster distribution.

Currently, OpenSCE project has been moved into umbrella of Thai National Grid Project, led by Thai National Grid Center.

Some components of OpenSCE, especially SCMSWeb, has been used to monitor many Grid computing researches. Such as PRAGMA, APGrid, and also Thai National Grid.
