= Mincome =

Canadian social experiment

Mincome, the "Manitoba Basic Annual Income Experiment", was a Canadian guaranteed annual income (GAI) social experiment conducted in Manitoba in the 1970s. The project was funded jointly by the Manitoba provincial government and the Canadian federal government under Prime Minister Pierre Trudeau. It was launched with a news release on February 22, 1974, under the New Democratic Party Manitoba government of Edward Schreyer, and was closed down in 1979 under the Progressive Conservative Manitoba government of Sterling Lyon and the federal Progressive Conservative Party of Joe Clark. The purpose of the experiment was to assess the social impact of a guaranteed, unconditional annual income, UBI, including whether a program of this nature would create disincentives to work for the recipients and, if so, to what extent.

== Program structure ==
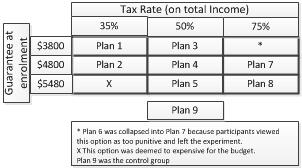

The experiment consisted of a randomized controlled trial in the City of Winnipeg and in rural Manitoba (the rural dispersed site). A so-called "saturation site" pilot project in the town of Dauphin, Manitoba was added in 1973. The Winnipeg and Dauphin sites randomly allocated lower-income households to one of seven treatment groups and a control group. The families in the treatment groups received an income guarantee or minimum cash benefit according to family size that was reduced by a specific amount (35, 50 or 75 cents) for every dollar they earned by working.

Dauphin was selected because the experiment was looking for a town of approximately 10,000 people, large enough to generate sufficient data to draw conclusions, but not bigger because it would cost too much, and the town needed to be close enough to Winnipeg to be able to drive to the town and back in a single day.

Dauphin residents were eligible for a single treatment that reduced the benefit guarantee by 50 cents for each dollar earned. Also, the Dauphin site had only one plan (Plan 3) and unlike the Winnipeg and rural dispersed sites, any resident of the city could apply.

== Results ==
No final Mincome report was issued, but a federal grant established the Institute for Social and Economic Research at the University of Manitoba in 1981. The institute developed a machine-readable database of the results of Mincome, leaving the analysis of the experiment to individual academic initiatives.

== Post-Mincome research ==
An important motivation of Mincome and the negative income tax experiments in the U.S. was to determine the impact of a guaranteed income plan on incentives to work. University of Manitoba economists Derek Hum and Wayne Simpson analyzed labour supply or work disincentive issues in Mincome during the 1980s and published their results in a series of papers and a monograph. Their results showed a small impact on labour markets, with working hours dropping one percent for men, three percent for married women, and five percent for unmarried women. The largest impact appeared to be changes in family composition, not the experimental treatments, as preschool children increased the labour supply of husbands and reduced the labour supply of wives by roughly the same modest amount. Even these decreases in hours worked may be seen to be offset by the opportunity cost of more time for family and education. However, some have argued these drops may be artificially low because participants knew the guaranteed income was temporary. This represents an important limitation to the knowledge of the impact of a guaranteed annual income as little is known about the long term effects on willingness to work.

Economists Derek Hum and Wayne Simpson analyzed the labour supply responses and discovered that they were generally smaller than those estimated for similar experiments in the United States. David Prescott, Robert Swidinsky, and David Wilton examined the labour supply response of female heads of household, showing that the presence of younger children and another income-earning head (husband) prompted a reduction in work. In 2016, David Calnitsky published an analysis of a community survey of Dauphin completed in 1976 that probed for motivations for participation and perceptions of stigma associated with a GAI. He finds that an important benefit of basic annual incomes is the reduced stigma compared to conventional welfare.

Economist Evelyn L. Forget conducted a quasi-experimental analysis that compared health outcomes of Dauphin residents with other Manitoba residents. This research did not use the Mincome data directly, but under the assumption that if a high proportion of Dauphin residents participated in Mincome, one should be able to discern differences in social, economic, and health outcomes for that group, compared to the general population. Forget found that in the period that Mincome was administered, hospital visits dropped 8.5 percent, with fewer incidents of work-related injuries, and fewer emergency room visits from accidents and injuries. Forget also compared proportions of women with children and suggested lower lifetime fertility as a possible outcome by comparing birth rates of young mothers with those of a control group. Additionally, the period saw a reduction in rates of psychiatric hospitalization, and in the number of mental illness-related consultations with health professionals.

The basic income is claimed to produce a range of health and social benefits, but it is important to underscore that none of the income maintenance experiments, including Mincome, produced direct evidence of a causal relation between income support and health outcomes. A focus of the Ontario Basic Income Pilot was to assess changes in health status among a range of other social outcomes, but the Ontario government cancelled this experiment in the summer of 2018.

A review of the Mincome experiment appeared in the Winnipeg Free Press on 23 January 2017. A comprehensive review of Mincome appears in Canadian Public Policy.

== Accessing Mincome data and documentation ==
Mincome data and documentation may be accessed through the University of Manitoba Library system at the university's Dataverse website.

== See also ==
- Basic income around the world
- Basic Income Grant Project in Omitara, Namibia
- Guaranteed Annual Income
- Guaranteed minimum income
- Income maintenance experiment
- Negative income tax
- Ontario Basic Income Pilot Project
- Social credit
- Social determinants of health
- Social liberalism
- Universal Basic Income
- Wage slavery
