= Saudi Commission for Health Specialties =

Professional body that regulates health care-related practices in Saudi Arabia

- الهيئة السعودية للتخصصات الصحية
- Formation: November 28, 1992; 33 years ago
- Secretary General: Prof. Aws I. Alshamsan
- Chairman: H.E. Fahad Al-Jalajel
- Parent organization: Ministry of Health
- Website: scfhs.org.sa

The Saudi Commission for Health Specialties (SCFHS; Arabic: الهيئة السعودية للتخصصات الصحية) is a Saudi Arabian scientific commission that regulates health care related practices and accreditation in Saudi Arabia. It is centered around the training and testing of health practitioners, training programs, and their accreditation. It was established on the 2 June 1992 by Royal Order M/2 to set standards for health practice. Its headquarters is in Riyadh and it has several branch offices across the Kingdom.

The Chairman of the commission's board of trustees is the Minister of Health, His Excellency Fahad Al-Jalajel, its Secretary General is Prof. Aws I. Alshamsan, and the Secretary General Deputies, where one of them is assigned for executive affairs.

== Vision ==
Empowering globally- competitive health professionals.

== Mission ==
Developing health professionals through a world class regulatory model by setting safe standards that are tailored to the evolving demands of the health ecosystem.

== Values ==
- Creativity
- Quality
- Professionalism
- Fairness

== Board of trustees ==
According to its Statute, issued by Royal Decree No. M/2, dated 6/3/1413 AH, SCFHS is a professional scientific commission which has a legal entity, supervised by a board of trustees. Article (5) of the Statute defines the Board of Trustees’ responsibilities as follows:

- Carry out and monitor SCFHS objectives and tasks.
- Approve SCFHS’ internal statute and set wages, salaries, incentives, memberships, membership renewals, administrative and financial tasks, terms of employment, administrative structure, member roles, disciplinary measures and other executive and technical responsibilities.
- Approve SCFHS’ budget, hire a chartered accountant and approve the balance sheet.
- Suggest amendments for SCFHS’ statute.
- Review the instructions and regulations governing health-related majors and professions, including the roles and responsibilities of practitioners, in addition to suggesting recommendations to develop those instructions and regulations and submitting them to the relevant authorities.
- Accept gifts and donations.
- Approve the investment policy for SCFHS’ revenues and savings.
- Set the executive regulations for SCFHS’ statute.

== Education and Training Executive Board ==
This Board is responsible for executive decisions and regulations which are related to accrediting, training and assessment in accordance with the commission's regulations and bylaws adopted by the board of trustees. It aims to approve the organizational regulations for education and training in addition to the executive regulations related to accreditation, training and assessment in consistence with regulations in force. Education and Training board consists of 27 members, those of competence, experience and high qualifications in health professions.

== Professional Practice Executive Board ==
This board is responsible for executive decisions and regulations related to classification and registration in accordance with SCFHS regulations and bylaws adopted by the board of trustees. This board aims to approve the executive regulations for professional health practice and standards for classification of different professional ranks. In addition to developing health professions in Saudi Arabia. The Professional Practice Executive Board consists of 20 members, those of competence, experience and high qualifications in health professions.

== See also ==
- Saudi Council of Engineers
- Saudi Arabia
- Health care in Saudi Arabia
