= List of basic income models =

A basic income is a form of social security in which a population group receives a regular sum of money, either from a government or from some other public institution, independent of any other income. This is a list of alternates to universal basic income that intends to give all citizens of a population an unconditional sum of money, which have been implemented or proposed.

Name	Description	Spokespersons	Tested in	Books	Films/articles/interviews
Universal basic income (UBI), also known by many other names	Periodic cash payment unconditionally delivered to all on an individual basis, without means-test or work requirement.	Philippe Van Parijs, Karl Widerquist, Guy Standing	US and Canada (local experiments); the Iranian basic income is somewhat between a partial and a full basic income.	Independence, Propertylessness, and Basic Income, Real Freedom for All, Public Economics in Action: the Basic Income/Flat Tax proposal, Basic Income: A Radical Proposal for a Free Society and a Sane Economy	Why we should give everyone a basic income, A Basic Income for All: Dream or Delusion?, About Basic Income.
Universal Data Wages	Recurring wages earned by empowering individuals to become data producers through institutions like a Community Data Bank.	Manish Bhan	USA		
Negative income tax (NIT)	Similar to a basic income but means test so that the grant gradually phases out as income increases.	Milton Friedman, Juliet Rhys-Williams, Daron Acemoglu		Capitalism and Freedom, Free to Choose	Negative income tax & work, Negative income tax in Israel, Negative income tax in Ontario, Short info
Wage subsidy, sometimes known as participation income	Scope limited to people in work (varyingly interpreted).	A. C. Pigou, Edmund Phelps, Tony Atkinson		Inequality (2015; Atkinson)	'Low-wage employment subsidies versus the welfare state' (Phelps)
Partial basic income (PBI)	Any basic income set at a level that is less than enough to meet a person's basic needs.		Alaska (Permanent Fund of Alaska)		
Citizen's dividend	Dependent on land value tax values from land and rents	Henry George, Thomas Paine	Alaska (Permanent Fund Dividend)	Agrarian Justice, Progress and Poverty	
Universal dividend	Dependent on a portion of production, proxied by a fixed and flat tax on personal income and corporate net profits, distributed flat as a non-taxed benefit among all residents or citizens over a certain age.	John Moser			The American Citizen's Dividend
Basic income for households	In the form of BI or NIT. For Working people with children.	Edward Heath	United Kingdom (Family Income Supplement) From 1970 to 1986		The Pragmatist's Solution to Poverty': The Heath Government's Tax Credit Scheme and the Politics of Social Policy in the 1970s
Basic income + negative income tax	A combination of BI and NIT.	Hermione Parker investigated several versions in Instead of the Dole		Instead of the Dole	
$8000 UBI, $4000 (minimum income), $4000 Carbon tax dividend.	For those under 65. Seniors system unchanged.	Pascal J - naturalfinance.net in Canadian context.		naturalfinance.net	
Basic income and social insurance		Andreas Bergh			Bergh 2004
Stake holding grants	A large one-time grant, usually received when the individual reaches maturity.	Thomas Paine, Bruce Ackerman, Anne Alstott		The Stakeholder Society, Redesigning distribution	
European/regional basic income	Basic income for a region, for example Europe.	Van Parijs, Steve Quilley, Phillippe C. Schmitter m.fl.			Marc's proposal, NAFTA-divident
Conditional cash transfers (basic income with strings attached)	Not a guarantee because conditions exist, but conditions are easily fulfilled (or example, children going to school).	Michael Bloomberg	New York City (Opportunity NYC) From 2007 to 2010 Brazil (Bolsa Famila)	Just Give Money to the Poor: The Development Revolution from the Global South	Sharing Lessons from the First Conditional Cash Transfer Program in the United States.
Basic income for special regions (such as Israel-Palestine)		Philippe Van Parijs			
Basic income for food		FIAN			To poor countries
Global basic income		Global Basic Income Foundation, Myron J. Frankman m.fl., World Basic Income			
Local basic income	For a village, city, district, province, etc.	Karl Widerquist	Otjivero (Namibia), 2 villages in China, GiveDirectly project in Kenya, Alaska's Permanent Fund Dividend, Native American Casino Dividends	Alaska's Permanent Fund Dividend, Exporting the Alaska Model	
Social credit		Social credit movement, C.H. Douglas			
Basic income + flat tax	Equal tax rate.	M. Friedman, Tony Atkinson		Public Economics in Action: The Basic Income/Flat Tax Proposal	
Basic income + VAT	Basic income financed by tax on consumption.	Vivant			Germany
Basic income + demurrage	A self stabilizing money supply that is resistant to inflation and deflation.	Omar Syed, Aamir Syed		Sound Money Without Commodities	
Basic income justified by equal rights to natural resources		Karl Widerquist, Jay Hammond, Peter Barnes	Alaska, Iran (from 2011)	Independence, Propertylessness, and Basic Income, Capitalism 3.0	
Social dividend	Based on publicly owned enterprises, see market socialism.	James Meade, Oskar Lange, Abba Lerner, John Roemer, James Yunker			
Basic income instead of subventions			Iran (from 2011)		
Carbon fee and dividend	Basic income funded by a carbon tax.	Citizens' Climate Lobby	British Columbia		
Basic income to disaster regions					Haiti-1, A way to peace
Basic income in the form of energy credits					Cosmic Accounting
Basic income startup (ReCivitas)	"Lifetime Basic Income"	Marcus Brancaglione, Bruna Pereira	Brazil Quatinga Velho (local experiment)	Lessons from the Practice of Basic Income , Basic Income Startup	BRAZIL: Basic Income Startup gives "lifetime basic incomes" to villagers , NGO founds collaborative "projects network"
Basic income + monetary reform + land value tax		James Robertson, Herman Daly			
Universal right to capital income	"Legislation requiring that a percentage of capital stock (shares) from every initial public offering (IPO) be channeled into a Commons Capital Depository, with the associated dividends funding a universal basic dividend (UBD)", which would be entirely independent of welfare payments and unemployment insurance.	Yanis Varoufakis			The Universal Right to Capital Income
Three Pillars	National Dividend (ND) - a payment to all citizen-residents, paid for by a tax on the commons National Income Supplement (NIS) - distributing all income taxes back to income earners, which would allow all income brackets to benefit from each other's success, and amplify their earnings (and underwrite labour costs). Assisted Savings Program (ASP) - mandatory long-term savings/investment, and distributing all capital gains taxes to ASP accounts, ensuring savers benefit from each other's success, and amplify their savings. Returning tax revenues to citizens through these programs is enabled by a shift to a form of Land Value Tax (called a ULT) for general revenues. The Three Pillars would also replace the minimum wage and state-run pensions.	The New Physiocratic League		The New School of Economics	
