= ReCivitas =

Brazilian non-profit organization

ReCivitas Institute is a Brazilian NPO as crowd-funded unconditional basic income pilot project in Quatinga Velho, Brazil. The project paid 30 reals a month to around a hundred members of the community for five years(2008 to 2014). In January 2016, ReCivitas launched a “Lifetime Basic Income” in the Brazilian village of Quatinga Velho, a project it hopes will serve as a model to other organizations. This new project Basic Income Startup which intends to make these payments permanent. As of January 16, 14 residents of Quatinga Velho have basic incomes, now set at an amount of 40 Reais, that they will retain for at least 20 years.

The directors of ReCivitas, Bruna Augusto Pereira and Marcus Brancaglione have also published several papers and books on the results of pilot projects. And made several speeches in Congresses, Initiatives, Universities, and Forums around the World advocating for a Universal Basic Income and experimental models like Quatinga Velho.

== See also ==
- Quatinga Velho
- Basic income pilots
- List of basic income models
- Basic Income in Brazil
- Basic Income

== Bibliography ==
- Baert, Anthony. Experiências de transferência de renda universal. U.Catholique de Louvain. 2011
- Dill, Alexander. Local Commons in rural São Paulo. Basel Institute of Commons and Economics, 2011.
- Krozer, Alice. A regional Basic Income: towards the eradication of extreme poverty in Central America. ECLAC, United Nations, 2010.
- Pereira, B., & dos Santos, M. V. (2011a). Renda básica garantida no terceiro setor - Um breve relato sobre an experiência em Quatinga Velho. Mimeo, ReCivitas
- Neto, Pedro T. dos Santos. Relatório semestral da Renda Básica. ReCivitas, 2009.
- Rudolph, Mathias. Nachhaltige Entwicklung von Quatinga Velho (Brasilien). Leuphana Universität Lüneburg, 2010.
- Pereira, Bruna; Brancaglione, Marcus. Analytical report of three years of pilot-project of basic income guarantee in Quatinga Velho . ReCivitas, 2012.
- Brancaglione, Marcus. Renda Básica Libertária. O verdadeiro dízimo. Clube de Autores, 2014.
- Brancaglione, Marcus. Lições da Renda Básica em Quatinga Velho. Ou o que se aprende quando não se pede nada em troca. Clube de Autores, 2014.
- Brancaglione, Marcus. Lessons From The Practice Of Basic Income. Clube de Autores, 2015.
- Brancaglione, Marcus. Renda Básica Universal. Clube de Autores, 2016.
- Brancaglione, Marcus. Basic Income Startup. Clube de Autores, 2017.
