= Universal basic income in Brazil =

In Brazil, universal basic income has been discussed at least since the 1980s. In 2001 a law was introduced by Senator Eduardo Suplicy of the Brazilian Workers Party which mandated the progressive institution of such a welfare system. By this move Brazil became the first country in the world to pass such a law. Suplicy had previously introduced a bill to create a negative income tax, but that bill failed to pass. The new bill called for a national and universal basic income to be instituted, beginning with those most in need. The bill was approved by the Senate in 2002 and by the Chamber of Deputies in 2003. President Lula da Silva signed it into law in 2004, and according to the bill it is the president's responsibility to gradually implement the reform. Since then Brazil has started to implement the bill through the Bolsa Família program, which was a centerpiece of President Luiz Inácio Lula da Silva's social policy, and is reputed to have played a role in his victory in the Brazilian presidential election, 2006.

== Bolsa Família ==
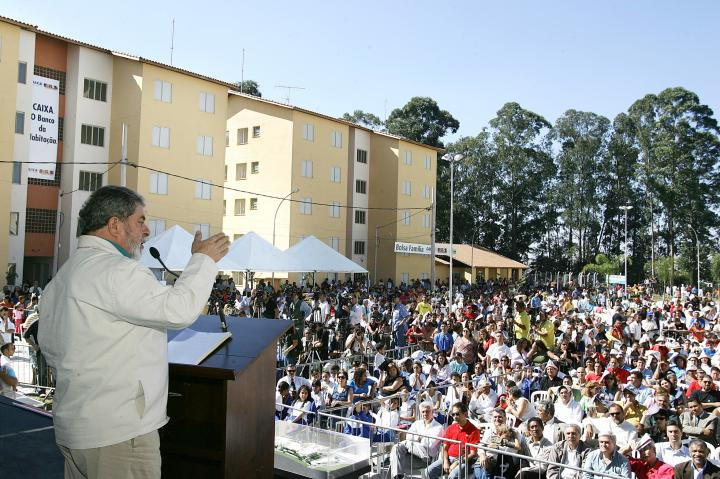
President Lula giving a speech to recipients of Bolsa Família and other federal assistance programs in Diadema

Bolsa Família is a social welfare program of the Brazilian government. The program attempts to both reduce short-term poverty by direct cash transfers and fight long-term poverty by increasing human capital among the poor through conditional cash transfers. It also works to give free education to children who cannot afford to go to school to show the importance of education. The part of the program that is about direct welfare benefits could perhaps best be described as a basic income with some prerequisites. Families with children, to be eligible for the income, must ensure that their children attend school and have been vaccinated. The Bolsa Familia program has been mentioned as one factor contributing to the reduction of poverty in Brazil, which fell 27.7% during the first term in the Lula administration. About 12 million Brazilian families receive funds from Bolsa Família, which has been described as "the largest programme of its kind in the world." By February 2011, 26% of the Brazilian population were covered by the program. As of March 2020, the program covers 13.8 million families, and pays an average of $34 per month, in a country where the minimum wage is $190 per month.

The reaction from multilateral institutions to Bolsa Família has generally been enthusiastic. During a trip to Brazil in 2005, the former president of the World Bank, Paul Wolfowitz said, "Bolsa Familia has already become a highly praised model of effective social policy. Countries around the world are drawing lessons from Brazil’s experience and are trying to produce the same results for their own people." Economic thinker and philosopher Joseph Heath praised the program in his 2010 book Economics without Illusions, citing it as an example of how to manage incentives of people whose poverty results from hyperbolic discounting. Heath wrote, "What makes programs such as this so successful is that they do not change people's incentives: They merely rearrange the temporal sequence in which these incentives are experienced. ... This has proven to be more valuable than a thousand recitations of the fable of the ant and the grasshopper."

=== Criticism ===
However, the program is far from being universally accepted by Brazilian society. Among the various criticisms it receives, one of the most recurrent is the assertion that it could discourage the search for employment, encouraging laziness of people. Under this premise, many people would give up trying to find a job, content, instead, to live on the Bolsa Família program. The Catholic Church, through its powerful National Conference of Bishops of Brazil (CNBB), maintains that "the program is addictive" and leads its beneficiaries to an "accommodation".

This, however, is not what the World Bank finds. Having conducted several surveys on the subject, the World Bank came to the conclusion that the program does not discourage work, nor social ascension. On the contrary, says Bénédicte de la Brière, responsible for the program monitoring at the institution: "Adult work is not impacted by income transfers. In some cases adults will even work harder because having this safety net encourages them to assume greater risks in their activities".

Another criticism of the program is the fact that it is perceived by opponents of the currently ruling party as a program meant to "buy" votes of poor people, creating clientism.

=== Surveys and research ===
Surveys conducted by the Federal Government among Bolsa Família's beneficiaries indicate that the money is spent, in order of priority, on food; school supplies; clothing; and shoes. A study conducted by The Federal University of Pernambuco, using sophisticated statistical methods, inferred that 87% of the money is used, by families living in rural areas, to buy food.

According to research promoted by some universities and the Brazilian Institute of Geography and Statistics (IBGE) the program has clearly contributed to Brazil's recent improvements in its fight against poverty. An ex ante econometric evaluation of Bolsa Escola did find significant effects on both school attendance rates and the number of children involved in child labor.

The World Bank, which provided a loan to assist the Brazilian government in managing the Bolsa Família Program, declares that "Although the program is relatively young, some results are already apparent, including: (...) contributions to improved education outcomes, and impacts on children’s growth, food consumption, and diet quality".

A study by the UNDP's International Policy Centre for Inclusive Growth found that over 80% of the Bolsa Familia benefits go to families in poverty (making under half the minimum wage per capita), thus most of the benefits go to the poor. Bolsa Familia was also found to have been responsible for about 20% of the drop in inequality in Brazil since 2001, which is welcome in one of the most unequal countries on the planet. Research promoted by the World Bank shows a significant reduction in child labor exploitation among children benefited by the Bolsa Família program.

One positive effect of the program which is not immediately apparent is that it makes a significant impact on the ability of the poorest families to eat. Children in public schools receive one free meal a day—two in the poorest areas—and so less of their family's limited income is needed to pay for food. In a survey of Bolsa Familia recipients, 82.4% reported eating better; additionally, it was reported to increase the incomes of the poorer families by about 25%.

== Benefício de Prestação Continuada ==
The Benefício de Prestação Continuada ("continuous payment benefit"), often abbreviated as "BPC" in Brazil, is another social welfare program at the federal level. People whose per-capita family income is less than one-quarter of the minimum wage and who either are at least 65 years old or have a long-term, totally incapacitating disability at any age are eligible. Beneficiaries receive one minimum wage every month.

In May 2025, the number of BPC beneficiaries amounted to about 6.2 million. That same month, the total amount paid to BPC beneficiaries was greater than the total amount paid to Bolsa Família beneficiaries in 1,167 of the 5,568 Brazilian municipalities.

== Other programs ==
=== Quatinga Velho ===
Quatinga Velho is a Brazilian village in the Quatinga district of the Mogi das Cruzes municipality, which is becoming well known because of the basic income-project which is taking place there. The project started 2008 and is organized by the non-profit organization ReCivitas. The funding has so far been based entirely on private donations. In June 2011, 83 people in the village got 30 Brazilian reals per person and month. The organization hopes that all people in the village will eventually get the basic income, and also that similar projects will get going in other villages in and outside Brazil. The organizers are currently building a social bank, so that the basic income in the future can be financed through investments rather than donations. The idea is that the bank will operate as an investment bank, but the profit will go to basic income instead of a dividend to shareholders and managers. One plan is to use some of the first revenue to support the basic income project in Otjivero, Namibia, and then to initiate similar projects in different parts of Brazil.

=== Santo Antônio do Pinhal ===
In November 2009, the mayor of the Santo Antônio do Pinhal municipality passed into law a basic income program that would reserve 6% of its tax revenue to fund an unconditional dividend for all persons who have resided in the municipality for five years or more.

As of November 2011, Santo Antônio do Pinhal was the only municipality in Brazil which had implemented a basic income program. Senator Eduardo Suplicy has praised the municipality for being a pioneer in implementing such a program at a municipal level in Brazil.

=== Apiaí ===
In November 2013, the Apiaí municipality adopted a similar law to Santo Antônio do Pinhal's, with the difference that no portion of the municipality's tax revenue was directly allocated to the fund, due to a veto to that clause.
