= Universal basic income pilots =

Type of experiments

Universal basic income pilots are smaller-scale preliminary experiments which are carried out on selected members of the relevant population to assess the feasibility, costs and effects of the full-scale implementation of universal basic income (UBI), or the related concept of negative income tax (NIT), including partial universal basic income and similar programs. The following list provides an overview of the most famous universal basic income pilots, including projects which have not been launched yet but have been already approved by the respective political bodies or for the negotiations are in process.

== North America ==
=== Pilots in the United States in the 1960s and 1970s ===
Beginning in the end of 1960s, there were four universal basic income experiments conducted in the United States, all in the form of NITs. As Alicia H. Munnell, who was examining the experiments in Indiana, Seattle and Denver explains, a moderate reduction in work effort (17% among women, 7% among men) has been found by the American economist Gary Burtless. Munnell also mentions that the money people had received was not squandered on frivolous products such as drugs and luxury goods. In addition, there has been an increase in school attendance. However Jodie Allen remarked that work disincentive effects were large enough to suggest that as much as 50 to 60 percent of the transfers paid to two-parent families under NIT might go to replace lost earnings. No noticeable improvements to health and the overall well-being were discovered and the effect on home-ownership rates was found to be negligible as well.

Experiment Title	The New Jersey Graduated Work Incentive Experiment (NJ)	The Rural Income-Maintenance Experiment (RIME)	The Seattle/Denver Income-Maintenance Experiments (SIME/DIME)	The Gary, Indiana Experiment (Gary)
Site(s)	New Jersey & Pennsylvania	Iowa & North Carolina	Seattle & Denver	Gary, Indiana
Duration	1968–1972 3 years	1970–1972 3 years	1970–1980 3 years (71%)；5 years (25%)；20 years (4%)	1971–1974 3 years
Sample Size； initial(final)	1216(983)	809(729)	4800	1799(967)
Type of Families Enrolled	Two-parent household	Two-parent household (73%) Single-parent household, prime age(13%) Two or Single-parent household over 59(14%)	Two-parent household (61%) Single-parent household (39%)	Two-parent household (41%) Single-parent household (54%)
Racial Composition	Black (37%) White (32%) Hispanic (31%)	Black (35%) White (65%)	Black (43%) White (39%) Chicano (18%)	Black (100%)
Target Population	Total family income not exceeding 150% of the poverty level	Total family income not exceeding 150% of the poverty level	Single-parent household earning less than $11,000 Two-parent household earning less than $13,000	Black families with at least one child under the age of 18, and family income not exceeding 240% of the poverty level
Primary intervention	Negative income tax	Negative income tax	Negative income tax	Negative income tax
Cost (nominal$)	$7,800,000	$6,100,000	$77,500,000	$20,300,000
Outcomes of interest	(1) Reduction in work effort (2) Lifestyle changes	(1) Work behavior (2) Health, school, and other effects on poor children; (3) Savings and consumption behavior	(1) Effects on labor supply (2) Marital stability; and (3) Other lifestyle changes	(1) Employment (2) Schooling (3) Infant mortality and morbidity (4) Educational achievement (5) Housing consumption
Range of Guarantee	50%；75%；100%；125%	50%；75%；100%	92%；116%；135%	77%；101%
Range of Tax rates	30%；50%；70%	30%；50%；70%	50%；70%； {70 - 0.0025×(Family Income)}%； {80 - 0.0025×(Family Income)}%	40%；60%

=== Mincome in Manitoba ===
A similar field experiment of the Canadian Guaranteed Annual Income (GAI), known as Mincome, took place in Dauphin, Manitoba between 1974 and 1979. According to a research into the effects of Mincome on population health, conducted by a University of Manitoba researcher Evelyn Forget in 2011, the experiment has resulted in significant reduction in hospitalization, specifically in case of mental health diagnoses. Among all the people, only two key groups were found to be discouraged from working by the Mincome project – new mothers and teenaged boys, who, instead of entering the workforce at an early age, decided to study until grade 12, increasing the proportion of students who graduate high school.

=== Native American casinos and tribal profit sharing ===
A longitudinal study of 1,420 low income children in rural North Carolina designed to observe their mental condition had the unintended result of also measuring the effect of an unconditional cash transfer on a subset of this group. The Great Smoky Mountains Study of Youth has found that a quarter of the families belonging to the Eastern Band of Cherokee Indians have experienced a surge in annual income due to a newly built casino as during this study, a portion of profits of this casino were unconditionally distributed to all tribal members on a semi-annual basis. Key findings of this study include lower instances of behavioural and emotional disorders among the children and improved relationship between children and their parents, as well as reduction in parental alcohol consumption.

=== Y Combinator ===
In May 2016, Y Combinator, an American company with the aim of providing seed funding for start-up companies, announced that its non-profit arm YC Research would perform a five-year unconditional basic income study, which resembles the experiments carried out in the 1960s and 1970s, in Oakland, California.

The project was delayed by institutional review board approval at Stanford University and the University of Michigan, and work with governments to ensure recipients would not lose benefits they were already receiving. The project gave six people from Oakland $1500 per month in an initial feasibility study. Instead of the previous plan of giving 100 families $1,500 per month, by mid-2018 YC Research was hoping to get 30 to 40 people from Oakland to participate in a $50 per month trial to refine the logistics of distribution and retention of the $50 per month control group. It was planning to run three- and five-year trials in two states, not including Oakland, involving 1,000 participants randomly assigned to $1,500 per month and 2,000 randomly assigned to the $50 per month control group. The full study is expected to cost $60 million, and YC Research is waiting for fundraising to complete before starting the study.

=== Ontario Basic Income Pilot Project ===
In Ontario, three-year basic income projects were launched in three regions from late spring to fall 2017. The participants of the project were randomly selected among resident of the regions aged 18–64, who were living on low income. The purpose of the experiment was to tackle poverty, providing people with income security while, at the same time, not discouraging them from entering the labour force. Furthermore, as poverty is believed to be one of the biggest determinants of health, the project is believed to improve health condition, which could, in turn, reduce health-care costs for the government. The pilot project was cancelled on July 31, 2018 by the newly elected Progressive Conservative government under Ontario Premier Doug Ford, with his Minister of Children, Community and Social Services Lisa MacLeod stating its cost was 'unsustainable'.

Payments to participants continued until March 2019.

=== Stockton, California ===
In a pilot project in Stockton, California which began in February 2019, 125 residents of the city who were living at or below the median income line (around $46,000 annually) were given $500 monthly stipends, distributed through the mail in the form of debit cards, for eight months. Stockton, California is a city in the heart of the San Joaquin valley and the pilot program flourished from the support of the then-mayor, Micheal Tubbs. His efforts founded a non-profit organization that helped provide the monthly income. Income came from private funds or donations. The Universal Basic income pilot project has also been referenced as the SEED (Stockton Economic Empowerment Demonstration) project or the GI (Guaranteed Income) project. The project aimed to help improve the prominent poverty problem in Stockton. Results evaluated in October found that most participants had been using their stipends to buy groceries and pay their bills. Around 43% of participants had a full or part-time job, and only 2% were unemployed and not actively seeking work.

Critics suggest that basic income could remove the incentive to work. While this study did not find any evidence of that, one researcher noted that the two-year length of this study is not likely to be representative of continuous basic income, because when people know that income is temporary, they are unlikely to quit their jobs, although they might if basic income was permanent. Whether or not the incentive to work diminished during these times, there was a positive psychological effect on individuals based on how they felt in having a guaranteed income each month. The project aimed towards improving the community's well-being. However, the project was impacted by the COVID-19 pandemic one year into the project, which altered how much people were able to stretch their income. Covid-19 impacted people financially, due to reduction in jobs and presence of a recession. There was a heightened need in more income based on the circumstances, which the basic income project was able to provide.

=== Massachusetts ===
A number of basic income studies are being conducted in the Boston metro area in the early 2020s, including separate studies performed by Camp Harbor View, United South End Settlements, UpTogether (with the Massachusetts Department of Transitional Assistance), and Harvard Business School.

== Africa ==
=== Namibia ===
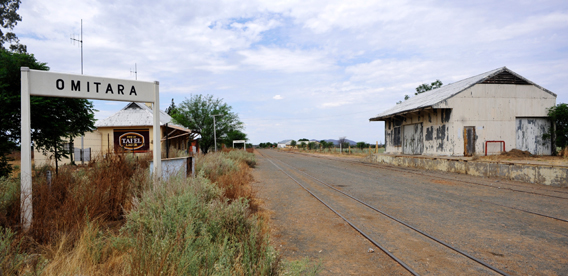
Omitara, one of the two poor villages in Namibia where a local basic income was tested in 2008–2009

In 2008, the Namibian Basic Income Grant Coalition conducted a two-year basic income pilot in the Otjivero - Omitara settlement, providing N$100 (US$7) per month to every person under the age of 60. The treatment group consisted of around 1,000 people, and a combination of panel and case studies was used to measure outcomes. After the study ended at the end of 2009, a monthly allowance of N$80 was paid to all participants until March 2012.

In 2013, due to extreme drought conditions, the Evangelical Lutheran church in Namibia provided a monthly cash grant of $100 to 6,000 individuals in four communities, modeled after the initial pilot program, from September 2013 to May 2014. In June 2014, the program restarted thanks to support from the Waldensian Church in Italy, lasting until June 2015.

=== Uganda ===
A program in Uganda randomly awarded unsupervised grants of $382 to 535 young applicants aged 15–35. The results showed that "the program increases business assets by 57%, work hours by 17%, and earnings by 38%". In addition, many of those who participated in the project have also started their own enterprises, creating job opportunities for others. In January 2017, another pilot study, designed for two years, was launched by the charitable organization Eight in an undisclosed village consisting of 50 households. The experiment, which is being recorded in a documentary, aims to evaluate the effects of basic income in four areas: education participation of girls and women, access to healthcare, engagement in democratic institutions and local economic development. The amount of income distributed to the village residents per month is $18.25 for adults and $9.13 for children.

=== GiveDirectly in Kenya ===
GiveDirectly, one of the highest ranking charities according to GiveWell, is running the world’s largest and longest-term experiment to date studying the effects of a universal basic income.

The project has a budget of US$30,000,000 and started in 2016. In total, 20,000 recipients from 195 rural villages are receiving a universal basic income for a period of two or twelve years, depending on the study group they belong to. In addition, 100 villages are also part of the study as a control group. Between April and June 2020, the researchers surveyed 8,427 participants of the study groups to track the impact of the UBI during the COVID pandemic situation. Those who received UBI were less prone to food insecurity, had a better physical and mental state, and were motivated to start a business.

== Asia ==
=== Madhya Pradesh, India ===
The basic income project in Madhya Pradesh, India, which started in 2010, involves 20 villages. While the villagers in eight of those got basic income, the others serve as control groups. According to the first communication of the pilot projects, positive results were found. Villages spent more on food and healthcare, children's school performance improved in 68% of families, time spent in school as well as personal savings nearly tripled and new business start-ups doubled. The study has also found an increase both in economic activity and in savings, an improvement in housing and sanitation, improved nutrition, less food poverty, improved health and schooling, greater inclusion of the disabled in society and a lack of frivolous spending. The initiative was organized in partnership with the UNICEF and SEWA and co-piloted by British researcher Guy Standing and Indian activist Renana Jhabvala with support of the economist Pranab Bardhan.

=== Iran ===
In Autumn 2010, Iran implemented a nationwide basic income program. It is provided to all citizens and replaces subsidies for gasoline, electricity and some food items that the government has applied for the elimination of inequality and poverty for years. In 2012, the sum was approximately US $40 per person per month, US $480 per year for one person and US $2,300 for a five-person family.

=== Israel ===
In Israel, in 2018 a non-profit initiative GoodDollar was launched, aiming to build a global economic framework for providing universal, sustainable and scalable universal basic income through new digital asset technology of blockchain. The non-profit aims to launch a peer-to-peer money transfer network in which money can be distributed to those most in need, regardless of their location, based on the principles of universal basic income. The project has raised $1 million from eToro.

== Latin America ==
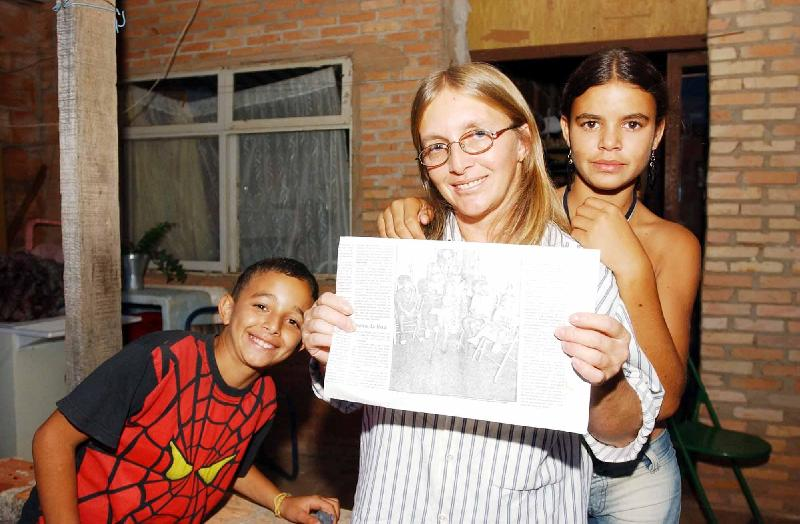
The family of Selma Ferreira was the first recipient of Bolsa Escola, a precursor to Bolsa Família enacted by governor Cristovam Buarque of the Federal District in 1995.

=== Bolsa Familia ===
Bolsa Familia is a Brazilian federal anti-poverty program with strong resemblance of basic income. It consists of a cash grant, which is given to families below a certain income level, provided they meet pre-arranged conditions such as overseeing their children's school attendance. As of March 2020, the program covers 13.8 million families, and pays an average of $34 per month, in a country where the minimum wage is $190 per month.

Other similar programs are implemented in several Latin American countries, including the Oportunidades programme in Mexico.

=== Quatinga Velho ===
Quatinga Velho is a Brazilian village in the Quatinga district of the Mogi das Cruzes municipality, which is becoming well known for its basic income project launched in 2008 and organized by the non-profit organization ReCivitas. The funding has been entirely based on private donations so far. In June 2011, 83 villagers were given 30 Brazilian reals per person each month. The organization's objective is to eventually grant the basic income to all villagers and to get similar projects going in other villages as well, both in and outside Brazil. The organizers are currently building a social bank, so that the basic income can be financed through investments rather than donations in the future. The idea is that the bank will operate as an investment bank, but the profit will be allocated to basic income instead of a dividend to shareholders and managers.

== Europe ==
=== Netherlands ===
Experiments with basic income in the Netherlands are experiments with social assistance (more than basic income) as they focus on current welfare claimants. The most important experiment was called Weten wat werkt (Knowing What Works) and was a cooperation between Utrecht University and the City of Utrecht, studying "alternative approach to deliver social assistance". During the experiment, social assistance claimants were randomly divided into four groups, each of which received payments under different conditions. The aim of the study was to investigate the effects of different or fewer rules on claimants of social assistance. The experiment was supposed to be launched on 1 May 2017, but approval by the Dutch Ministry of Social Affairs and Employment was delayed. The experiment started in June 2018 and concluded in October 2019. Results showed that there were no negative effects and some positive results for all three interventions compared to the control group. Participants increased their participation in the labour market but benefits to their health were too small to be statistically significant.

=== Finland ===
A nationwide, two-year pilot scheme was launched in Finland on 1 January 2017. In total, 2,000 participants, who were randomly selected among those receiving unemployment benefits and aged 25–58, were entitled to an unconditional income of €560 per month, even if they found work during the two year period. The experiment tests whether the implementation of basic universal income could help provide welfare more in line with the changing nature of work, reduce the cost and complexity of the benefits system and provide citizens with greater incentive to find work. Addressing issues caused by automation, long-term unemployment and lower wages are part of a larger social context for the experiment.

As planned, the experiment ended at the end of 2018, and the government of Finland has decided not to continue the experiment while the results of the study are analyzed. Preliminary results were released in 2019. While levels of employment did not change, it did report that those involved showed "fewer stress symptoms, fewer difficulties concentrating and fewer health problems than the control group. They were also more confident in their future and in their ability to influence societal issues." The full results of the study will come in 2020, after researchers have had time to analyse all the collected data.

The study was generally considered a failure, though many experts have stated that the experiment had many problems making its results not necessarily generalizable.

=== Italy ===
In June 2016, the mayor of an Italian coastal city of Livorno Filippo Nogarin launched a conditional minimum income project for a period of six months, granting 100 of the poorest families in the city a monthly sum of US$537 to cover their basic costs such as rent and food. The project is not an unconditional basic income. In January 2017, the scope of the project was extended to include another 100 families. Even though the granted sum is not as high as in case of Finland or other countries, it constitutes a huge relief for the families which are otherwise not protected at all due to the lack of unemployment benefits and minimum wage laws in Italy. The project has already inspired other Italian cities, such as Ragusa and Naples, to consider launching similar schemes as well. In Italy, other projects of minimum guaranteed income had already been realized, much more advanced both for the amount of money and for the purposes of the Livorno project. One of these had been implemented in the Lazio Region thanks to the introduction of a law (4/2009) which in 2010 envisaged about 600 euros per month for the unemployed, particularly for women. About 10,000 people had participated in this first phase of starting the law for the minimum guaranteed income. The subsequent regional government has not funded the law again.

=== Scotland ===
In 2018, the Scottish Government agreed to provide £250,000 to undertake initial research on the feasibility of a basic income pilot. The project determined that such a pilot was feasible, but with larger-scale legislative problems in executing the problem Making use of the term Citizen's Basic Income (CBI), the writers of the report recommended that pilot should be "a randomised controlled study, with two study areas where the whole community receives a CBI". However, the report also noted that there were "substantive and complex legislative and delivery barriers to piloting a CBI", given that Scottish Parliamentary powers were limited in their ability to make the needed changes to the social security system (which were determined at the UK Parliament in Westminster). The current constitutional and legal set up "would place significant restrictions on the pilot model design and potentially compromise learnings." The Scottish Government of 2022 therefore decided to focus on a Minimum Income Guarantee (MIG)

The Royal Society for the Encouragement of Arts, Manufactures and Commerce also produced a report in 2019 examining some of the benefits and challenges of a basic income system in the region of Fife.

=== Spain ===
In Spain, the ingreso mínimo vital is an economic benefit guaranteed by the Social security in Spain in its modality no contributory. The IMV is defined as a "subjective right" and is intended to prevent poverty and social exclusion of people who live alone or integrated in a coexistence unit, when they are in a situation of vulnerability due to lack of sufficient financial resources to cover their basic needs. The benefit, which is not fixed and varies depending on various factors, ranges between €461.5 and €1,015.

=== Germany ===
In August 2020, a project in Germany started that gives a €1,200 monthly basic income to 120 citizens, which will last three years and be compared against 1,380 people who do not receive basic income.

=== Wales ===
On 14 May 2021, the Welsh Government announced its intention to pilot a UBI scheme in Wales. The First Minister, Mark Drakeford said the pilot would "see whether the promises that basic income holds out are genuinely delivered" in people's lives. The pilot began in July 2022 and gives those who have left care in Wales who are aged 18-years-old and over £1,600 a month before tax, which comes to £1,280 a month after tax. The pilot lasted for two years.
