= Quatinga Velho =

Independent basic income pilot

Quatinga Velho, or the Consortiun of Basic Income of Citizenship, is an independent basic income pilot conducted by the NPO ReCivitas who experienced payment of an unconditional basic income via direct democracy and funded by direct donations from people around the world. Basic income charity is run in the small community of Quatinga Velho in Brazil.

== History ==
"The independent basic income program, in line with the principles of universality and unconditionality, began 25 October 2008 in Quatinga Velho, Mogi das Cruzes, Brazil. All local residents in the community were informed that they would get the money regularly without any discrimination or requirement to reciprocate, as long as they wanted to take part in the pilot. The project was originally expected to last for one year and pay a monthly amount of R$30,00 to 27 members of this community. However, at the meeting in November, the consortium decided to continue the project for another year. After 15 months, the project paid unconditional income to 67 residents of Quatinga Velho."

“Recivitas has been running a privately funded basic income for a small, impoverished rural community in the state of São Paulo, Brazil for three years now. Recivitas was founded and is run by Bruna Augusto Pereira and Marcus Vinicius Brancaglione. The project pays 30 Brazilian Reais (about US$15) per month to people in the community of Quatinga Velho, São Paulo, Brazil. This amount of money sounds very small to people from industrialized countries, but it has a large impact in a rural area of Brazil.

The coordinators have verified gains in nutrition, clothing, living conditions, health (especially in children), construction of new housing, and improvements to existing ones. In informal interviews, the coordinators have noticed increased self-esteem and social interaction, reduction of social insecurity, and rising expectations of the future, especially regarding children. They noted that they have not observed increased use of alcohol or illicit drugs; significant changes in labor relations, birth, migration or emigration, or generation of political relations and economic dependency.

Although the project leaders are examining the effects of the local basic income, the coordinators of the project told USBIG that the point of the project is not to study BIG. They are already convinced that model has been proven effective; they want to put it into practice. The goal is to put the policy in place. If governments are not ready to do it on a national scale with tax funding, Recivitas is attempting to do it on a small scale with private funding.

== Theses and results ==
"The basic income model should be consistent with the libertarian spirit, should be formulated not as aid but as a universal human right to social security. So we make a cash transfer project, conceived as integrated pedagogical process, in which the community changing is the school, combining the security of vital political emancipation and cultural transformation. Model based: on direct democracy, radical transparency - where all the funds collected are passed on to beneficiaries, and community self-determination - designed as a social networking site formed by the mutual recognition of the residents and not delimited by geopolitical boundaries or others. Even with the benefit of low-riding, the first results were observed by the third month of the project. Verified: gains in nutrition, clothing and living conditions and health, especially in children, construction of new housing and/or improvements to existing ones. In general, the use of income stuck to buying basic needs, although some families have the time to plan the use of the benefit using the resource in microenterprises, included poorer families. It was also noticed increased self-esteem and social interaction, reduction of social insecurity, and rising expectations of the future, especially regarding children. Was not observed: increased use of alcohol or illicit drugs; significant changes in labor relations, birth, migration or emigration justified by the basic income, or generation of political relations and economic dependency, whether in relation to basic income, or the filmmakers the project. You can still see increased integration and community participation, with significant impact on measurements of social capital."

== Conclusions ==
"From experience, it is observed that the value of the amount is not only subjective or relative to cost of living location. There is a reason, in which the value of the amount of basic income is comparatively higher for those who need more of the same. For the same reason that there is less private interest, but not the collective, participate in the project to those with higher purchasing power, implying that the particular interest in taking part of this program is proportional to the subjective valuation of the basic income. This proportional ratio between need and allows evaluation, self-governing or participating projects, the focus of the audience by setting the amount of basic income, they may be rightly prioritize the poor without the undesirable effects of conditionalities. Procedure more efficient, economical and unbureaucratic to fight poverty and promote social security, avoiding the evils of discrimination and segregation, as well as the associated operational costs. We also observed a negative relationship between uncertainty and the perspective on life - understood as a psychological phenomenon corresponding to the very opening of the horizon of possibilities of the person, the basic income and the ability to act directly in the social and psychological phenomenon, promoting human and economic development while generating social capital and financial security, trust and perspectives needed to free enterprise, responsibility and entrepreneurship. Constituting themselves as a possible foundation for solidarity economy, just to leverage social technologies such as microcredit. We conclude that the method employed was the key to the extrapolated results to material improvement. The model applied suggests the possibility of enabling the basic income scale replication and propagation in the network via the integrated civil societies, if strategically applied economic centers to the suburbs, can become an instrument of pragmatic policies, governmental or otherwise, to eradicate extreme poverty and empowerment. The study also suggests the possibility of enabling the Basic Income by social pact and associations, banking and financial models, avoiding taxation."

== Conditional x unconditional ==
"(...) Mathias Rudolph (2010) obtained this exact consequence as one of the results of his research. The residents of Quatinga Velho noticed that the existence of the BIG project improved the level of participation by the residents of the community. That is, what it was a disperse group became a community. Many are the examples of the project, even if it is a small scale initiative, attending almost 90 people. They are examples collected by ReCivitas itself and confirmed in field analysis and by the independent study of Mathias Rudolph, which prove the bonding capacity of BIG and its capacity of becoming and a safety net for those involved. The certainty of BIG, regardless of the family's socioeconomic status or of the ability to comply with conditions allowed those involved to develop and implement plans. There are cases such as the mother who was able to set BIG aside for the development and growth of her small daughter, without compromising the household expenses. Such as the two young men who were able to buy a motorbike together to move around between the farms where they work. The example of the woman who discovered she had chronic health problems and was able to go to the doctor and buy medicines for her monthly treatment. The mother who could save her son from pneumonia, with the purchase of medicines. The mother who buys her medicine in installments from the city pharmacist, who knows about her right and about the certainty of the BIG, in the same way as the local grocery owner. The families who were able to feed their children with meat and fruit, to give them school supplies, clothing. The mothers who had better pregnancies with babies born without malnutrition, which used to be so frequent. The child who can read today for 15 having glasses. The families who built their houses, vegetable gardens, cages, chicken coops. Who paid their debts with banks. The difference, therefore, between a conditioned program and the unconditional citizen's income goes far beyond normative structures or different theoretical conditions. The non-conditionality allows a result that was not only not reached by a program with conditions, but even prejudiced."

== Social capital ==
"In opposite to surveys in industrial countries the participation in social capital surveys in development countries is almost 100 per cent – so in rural São Paulo. In Quatinga Velho neighbourhood in all forms seems to be the most important social common. The time dedicated to others outside the family without being paid is more than the average working time per capita in many developed countries. This represents an enormous asset to maintain, to develop and to grow. The recently published World Giving Index ranked Brazil No. 76* and published the following table: Brazil Chile Haiti Colombia Percentage giving money 25 48 40 24 Percentage Volunteering time 15 16 38 20 Percentage helping a stranger 49 49 35 63 The database of the World Giving Index is the result of a Gallup survey with samples in all states. The poor result for Brazil – only 15 per cent of the people provide volunteering time – can not be testified by our survey. In opposite it seems that volunteering defined as help for neighbours is the major social common. (…)The BIC project in Quating Velho shows, that providing a Basic Income may be the cheaper solution with a better effect on the local social capital and commons."

== Conclusions from coordinators ==
=== Possibilities ===
"The possibilities opened by the first experience we emphasize those with the greatest potential for innovation: 1.focusing by value; 2. the validity of a Basic Income in nature; 3. feasibility of a non-governmental Basic Income.

Although not used as a criterion to prioritize the most needy, self-management systems, you can use the definition of value to promote a gradual strategic expansion of a real BI focused on the poorest; perfectly consistent, therefore, the principle of unconditionality, since there could be no discriminatory process or impediment to any person of a particular community would receive the BI from the manifestation of his will.

As the focus value is not required to segregate the same community, or make any kind of "triage" of the poor to prioritize them. However, we should not pulverize the same BI for a large territory. First, because the focus value has its efficiency reduced by the greater variation between the costs of life in the same location - being much more functional when applied in different ways for each community or local economy. And second, because, taking into account that social inequality tends to be reflected also in the geographical distribution of wealth, we can make a much more efficient use of resources by directing them to the neediest areas, or more specifically providing priority to locations with greater social risk, the resources needed for training and provision of new communities protected by Basic Income.

This way if allying with the value in targeting communities self-determined democratically with a strategic plan designed from the core of geo-referencing the poorest, we have the possibility of using the model developed in QV to make an accelerated plan for the eradication of poverty, more efficient and effective in both developed socioeconomic point of view, as also human.

Still in the strategic point of view that spread through the multiplication of communities nuclei added to the focus value is much more feasible than the expected formation of a majority and only then begin execution of an unconditional Basic Income.

So the reason that validates the value focus - namely: participation in the system is derived from the comparative value of Basic Income with the earnings of each individual - is the realization of a BI which value is not irrelevant for everyone, a valid action for gradually reaching a Basic Income either closer to the ideal the more significant this is becoming to a growing number of people - first because of the relative and subjective value of their amounts, and then due to the widespread perception of their security-productive effects, for the whole society.

The project opens the possibility of establishing a system to redistribute income that is not played or rather monopolized by government institutions, not necessarily supported by their taxes, or any kind of monopoly.

Formed through new social contracts executed automatically from banking systems, the proposition that the Basic Income can be implemented systematically by free enterprise within the market from banking systems contracted by collectives or individuals who recognize their common interests, not flees in absolute definition of a Basic Income, on the contrary adds a key component of its empirical definition, providing in an integrated way provision and financing: the free system of equal contributions of all income, for the provision of an equal BI for all, strictly a social contract before a government program or nongovernmental."

=== Understanding ===
"Occasionally these are the most significant changes provoked in our understanding of the experience. Concepts that not only reflected in the methodology, but influenced the strategic guidance and policy for the achievement of the BI. They are: i. The need for a democratic place for the existence of a genuine Basic Income; ii. The perception of the political community with social networking site regardless of geopolitical boundaries; iii. The legitimacy and necessity of civil society organizations to carry out new policies; iv. The importance of direct democracy and self-determination for the full exercise of citizenship; v. The need to discuss social action and educational process, not segregated from daily life; vi. The understanding of human development from the expansion of life perspectives; vii. And finally the measurability of the social contract, or more specifically the quality of systems to accomplish it through: a. Measure effectiveness by ensuring real freedoms as fundamental rights equal; b. Effectiveness measured by re-distribution of enforcement of fundamental rights; c. And efficiency is measured from the operational effectiveness compared to economy."

=== Means ===
We emphasize those of the developed methods that were the key to the success of the experience and consolidation of a model capable of replication: i. Self-determination for mutual recognition; ii. Self-management for direct democracy; iii. And the pedagogy of inspiration; Each of these methods as a product corresponding to the respective approach taken in the same order: i. The libertarian understanding of BI; ii. The identification of the community as a network; iii. The vision of the project as integrated pedagogical process.

As we have said we do not deny that the methodology has influence on the results, but also reaffirm that the congruence between the object and its method is itself inseparable from the empirical definition, and determining not only the fulfilment of the purpose of the process or system, but the character and authenticity of the program or project. The congruence between the principles and methods is not only fundamental to achieving the goal, or only determinant of the degree of correspondence between the object and its primary concepts or theoretical, is the foundation that defines the process, or more precisely the principle that is indeed. Something that involves serious objections to a Basic Income unconditional initiatives within authoritarian regimes.

A Basic Income can even exist within a weak democratic, authoritarian or populist, but not exactly under the responsibility of such a scheme, but as the product of free civil society initiative. Being the way, democratic self-management. The disintermediation that requires not only the power of individual and collective decision, but freedom of information and self-determination - essential to the exercise of fundamental rights to life and liberty that the BI is proposed to supply. In addition to self-management on the direct democracy, the self-determination for mutual recognition also proved a very effective method to identify and secure community and their integration, being the trigger for the exercise of the first decisions through direct democracy and even the constituent element of the community network. In its turn, this approach to the audience as a social network, was the key to the formation of QV as a real political community rather than mere location, this not only allowed to overcome the distortions generated by harnessing land ownership or proof of residence but also most well social connections consolidated settled on trust and reciprocity, to achieve an essential any system based on freedom and that aims for true democracy.

Furthermore, considering that a community network not only focuses on social relations, but the link that connects people composing their relations, had the design of the project as a learning process approach to promotes the construction of meanings shared that make up the community connections. Just as direct democracy, the so-called pedagogy of inspiration was not only an added value to the project, but a constituent element of BI, that by taking part of its constitution in fact, also became part of the model developed in the experience of QV for practical design of the BI. Acted as absolutely essential for practical configuration of Basic Income, as the method by which they gave: the knowledge of the meaning of the Basic Income, the direction of the project, and the character of its agents.

The project design as a libertarian and critical pedagogical process, not only saved the incorporation of conventional educational processes to fulfill the function of providing the necessary knowledge about the BI, but provided that the project will develop as its method of education for citizenship, mediated by experiences of social transformations and questions inherent in this - both about their reasons, and their results."

== Some related impacts of experiment ==
=== Use of income ===
“The of people not spending incomes responsibly leading to a preference of state transfers “in kind” or pegged to certain conditionality, is empirically defeated: very poor households with little access to paid work, have been shown to spend money received on basic consumption goods and education and healthcare for family members (Schubert, 2005; ReCivitas, 2009), well capable of taking strategic decisions on how to improve family livelihood in the medium and long term through responsible spending patterns (Standing, 2008).” –Alice Krozer, "A regional basic income: towards the eradication of extreme poverty in Central America". ECLAC, 2012.

=== Potential ===
“ The project is very small, but it shows incredibly enormous potentials and possibilities for social and economic development of the local community. I dare say that it marks a turning point of the World History of hunger and misery. Because, at the project-site, we could finally find the empirical evidence of effectiveness for the new and simple way to eliminate poverty of the world.” –Prof. Tadashi Okanouchi, Hosei University from Tokyo, 2011.

=== Citizenship ===
"Furthermore, from BI-QV, we learned that to really evolve from simple income transfer to universal BI, it is necessary that the management model of the program promotes the values of citizenship." Anthony Baert, Experiências de transferência de renda universal, 2011

=== Value of basic income ===
"The real value of R$30,00 BI at QV, just is sufficient to help people satisfy the most basic material needs. Children especially enjoy this QV benefit. The project ReCivitas succeeded with the use of extremely limited financial resource, to achieve significant social effects. Should be emphasized the positive impacts to the satisfaction of basic needs and quality of life of the project participants. The results indicate that the BI has contributed to sustainable development in QV. The effects were convincing, particularly in the area of assurance of basic needs, improving the quality of life and social skills." Mathias Rudolph, Leuphana Universität Lüneburg, 2010.

=== Direct democracy ===
"Eligibility for recognition in the assembly model is preferable in small communities where social control is possible. Although the rules are not always clear and objective, it just allows in one hand, complex deliberations and decisions "case by case", and secondly, a drastic reduction of costs of legislation and supervision (Pereira; dos Santos & dos Santos Neto, 2009, p. 5). Furthermore, this model for determining eligibility in the assembly is closer to the emancipation policy pursued by BI. (...)” : Anthony Baert, Economic School of Louvain, Université Catholique de Louvain.

=== From inside ===
"We are abandoned here, no one sets eyes. They came, raised my family. That money turns food on my table, look at the kids out here, happy, healthy. It's just you look and calculate how important it is the help that they do because they do not ask anything in return. To serve as an example to many, I think the way this is." Joel Inácio, inhabitant and member of Basic Income in Quatinga Velho

== See also ==
- Basic income pilots
- List of basic income models
- Basic income around the world
- Basic Income in Brazil
- Basic Income

== Bibliography ==
- Baert, Anthony. Experiências de transferência de renda universal. U.Catholique de Louvain. 2011
- Dill, Alexander. Local Commons in rural São Paulo. Basel Institute of Commons and Economics, 2011.
- Krozer, Alice. A regional Basic Income: towards the eradication of extreme poverty in Central America. ECLAC, United Nations, 2012.
- Pereira, B., & dos Santos, M. V. (2011a). Renda básica garantida no terceiro setor - Um breve relato sobre an experiência em Quatinga Velho. Mimeo, ReCivitas
- Neto, Pedro T. dos Santos. Relatório semestral da Renda Básica. ReCivitas, 2009.
- Rudolph, Mathias. Nachhaltige Entwicklung von Quatinga Velho (Brasilien). Leuphana Universität Lüneburg, 2010.
- Pereira, Bruna; Brancaglione, Marcus. Analytical report of three years of pilot-project of basic income guarantee in Quatinga Velho . ReCivitas, 2012.
- Brancaglione, Marcus. Renda Básica Libertária. O verdadeiro dízimo. Clube de Autores, 2014.
- Brancaglione, Marcus. Lições da Renda Básica em Quatinga Velho. Ou o que se aprende quando não se pede nada em troca. Clube de autores, 2014.
