= Karl Widerquist =

American political philosopher and economist

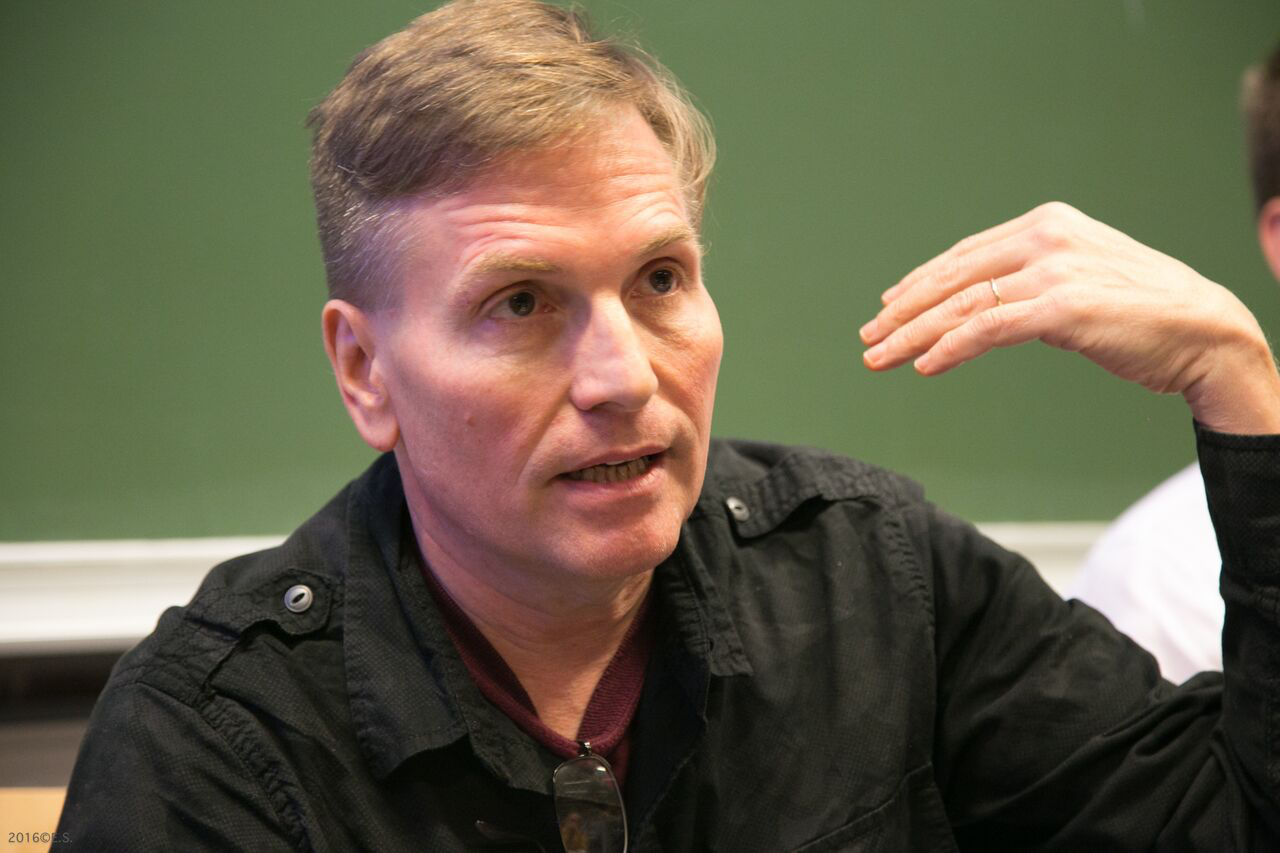
- Widerquist at BIEN Conference in 2016
- Born: February 7, 1965 (age 61); Chicago, Illinois, U.S.
- Occupations: Political philosopher, economist

Karl Widerquist (/ˈwaɪdərkwɪst/) is an American political philosopher and economist at Georgetown University on its campus in Qatar. He is best known as an advocate of basic income, but is also an interdisciplinary academic writer who has published in journals in fields as diverse as economics, politics, philosophy, and anthropology. He is a consistent critic of propertarianism, right-libertarianism, social contract theory, and the belief that modern societies fulfill the Lockean proviso.

Widerquist is the co-founder of the U.S. Basic Income Guarantee (USBIG) Network, which was the first Basic Income network in the United States. He was co-chair of the Basic Income Earth Network (BIEN) 2008–2017, and he co-founded Basic Income News in 2011. He has been a commentator on several television, radio, and print networks. According to the Atlantic Monthly, Karl Widerquist is "a leader of the worldwide basic income movement."

== Biography ==
Widerquist was born in Chicago, Illinois, in 1965, and grew up in Cassopolis, Michigan. Before entering academia, he was a musician, including a stint as bass player for Michael McDermott, and the indie bands, Remember Alice? and the Submonotones. He completed a Ph.D. in economics at the Graduate Center, CUNY in 1996, and one in Political Theory at the University of Oxford in 2006. Since 2009, he has been at Georgetown University-Qatar. He has appeared frequently in print, and on radio and television news networks.

== Advocacy of basic income ==
Widerquist has been a supporter of some form of basic income guarantee since he heard the topic discussed on an episode of Milton Friedman's television show Free to Choose at the age of 15 in 1980. He did not start writing, working, or publishing on the topic until the late 1990s. Widerquist has worked on basic income as an economist, a political theorist, a public policy analyst, and an organizer. In 1999, Widerquist co-founded the U.S. Basic Income Guarantee (USBIG) Network along with Michael A. Lewis, Fred Block, Erik Olin Wright, Charles M. A. Clark, and Pamela Donovan. Widerquist chaired the organization until 2008 and edited its email NewsFlash until 2014. Widerquist was the co-chair of the Basic Income Earth Network (BIEN) since 2008–2017. In 2011, together with Yannick Vanderborght, Widerquist co-founded BIEN's news website, Basic Income News, serving as its principal writer and editor until 2014, and he still periodically contributes to it. Along with BIEN's other co-chair, Louise Haagh, Widerquist chartered BIEN as a non-profit organization in 2016 and oversaw the expansion of BIEN's activities.

Widerquist's writing on basic income includes several articles reexamining the results of the negative income tax experiments conducted in the United States and Canada in the 1970s. He and Michael Howard co-edited two books on Alaska's Permanent Fund Dividend, addressing it as a working model of a small basic income. He has contributed to studies estimating that the United States could provide a full basic income at a cost of 2.95% of GDP per year and that the United Kingdom could provide a full basic income at a cost about 3.4% of GDP. Research by Widerquist published in January 2018, using U.S. Census Bureau data for 2015, examining an estimated poverty-level UBI of $12,000 per adult and $6,000 per child, concluded it could end poverty in the United States. The cost would be $539 billion per year, equivalent to 2.95% of America's GDP. In July 2020, he proposed a poverty-level universal basic income figure for the UK of £7,706 per adult per year, which is about £148 a week (or just over £642 per month) and £3,853 a year for children. Widerquist based his proposed figure for the UK on a study using data from the 2014/15 UK Family Resource Survey.

Widerquist has been critical of the 'reciprocity' or 'exploitation' objection to basic income. Under these objections, people who receive basic income without work are said to fail in the duty of reciprocity by accepting social benefits without contributing to their production and thereby are said to exploit workers who do produce those benefits. Widerquist contends that the distribution of ownership of resources violates the principle of reciprocity, because the law gives ownership of the Earth's resources to a limited group of people without compensation for the loss of the commons for others. Therefore, Widerquist argues, in order to be consistent with reciprocity, those who hold resources must make an unconditional payment to those who do not. Assuming this argument is held true, then instead of violating reciprocity, basic income is in fact required by that very principle. Widerquist further argues that basic income, so conceived, does not exploit workers because it does not matter how one gets control of resources (through work, inheritance, or any other means). What is critical is that anyone's ownership of resources must not be part of a system that imposes propertylessness on others. The absence of propertylessness is important not only to ensure that the privatization of resources is consistent with reciprocity but also to protect all workers from vulnerability to exploitation by their employers.

This view of property rights as something that both protects owners from interference and imposes interference on non-owners is a running theme throughout much of Widerquist's writing and his arguments for basic income. This idea is closely related to left-libertarian or Georgist views of property, which are based on the principles of self-ownership and some principle of equal access to natural resources. Left-libertarians argue that this view of resource rights is more consistent with negative freedom than any other view because the establishment and enforcement of property rights inherently interfere with non-owners in substantive ways and in a negative sense of the term.

Widerquist criticizes right-libertarianism and built up his own left-libertarian theory he calls "indepentarianism." Widerquist does not endorse the whole of either of those theories of justice. Instead, he presents his theory of justice as a separate ideology, which he calls "justice as the pursuit of accord." The central difference between this theory and more mainstream left-libertarianism is that it rejects the left-libertarian view that equal access to resources entitles people to an equal share of the market value of natural resources. Widerquist instead argues that disadvantaged might be entitled to greater redistribution larger than what would be required to equalize the income generated by natural resources. Building on Michael Otsuka's conception of "robust libertarian self-ownership", Widerquist argues that a universal basic income must be large enough to maintain individual independence regardless of the market value of resources because people in contemporary society have been denied direct access to enough resources with which they could otherwise maintain their own existence in the absence of interference by people who control access to resources. Updating Peter Kropotkin's empirical analysis and criticizing the right-libertarian theory of the state, Widerquist argues alongside Grant S. McCall argue that contemporary societies fail to fulfill the Lockean proviso, equality and freedom are compatible, stateless egalitarian societies promote negative freedom better than capitalism, the appropriation principle supports small-scale community property and the private-property right system associated with right-libertarian capitalism was established not by appropriation but by a long history of state-sponsored violence.

Widerquist makes several arguments for this position, the most important of which is that respect for equal freedom requires that any legitimate authority protects individuals from the most substantively important interference. This principle, Widerquist argues, requires respect for individuals’ status as free individuals, which in turn requires economic independence. Individuals need access to enough resources to ensure that they are not forced by propertylessness to serve the interests of people empowered to give them access to resources. Widerquist calls this concept “freedom as independence” or “freedom as the power to say no.” He argues that respect for independence in the present socio-economic context requires redistribution to come at least in part in the form of an unconditional basic income and that it must be at least enough to meet an individual's basic needs. He also argues that basic income is more effective in protecting vulnerable individuals from exploitation and other forms of economic distress than traditional conditional welfare state policies.

Widerquist is not the first to recognize that poverty effectively forces individuals to work in service to more advantaged individuals, nor is he the first to argue that basic income can relieve that effective force. The unique feature of his theory is the central role that it gives to “the power to say no” in an individual's status as a free person and the central role status freedom plays in his theory of justice. Since the mid-2010s, this line of argument seems to have become more important to the movement for basic income with two of the movement's long-term leaders, Philippe Van Parijs and Guy Standing, arguing along these lines in a TEDx Talk, “The Instrument of Freedom” and an interview (respectively).

== Empirical and anthropological criticism of contemporary political theory ==
Widerquist has done work both to clarify the concept of libertarianism and to criticize right-libertarianism version of it. He argues that the central principles that are meant to determine the just distribution of property in a right-libertarian economy can justify government ownership of the powers to tax, regulate, and redistribute property just as well as they can justify private ownership of property. It argues that no historical or principled reasons exist to believe that private owners holdings of their powers are any better justified than government holdings of its powers.

Karl Widerquist has collaborated with anthropologist Grant S. McCall to use anthropological evidence to debunk claims in contemporary political theory. They argue that, since the 1600s, most forms of social contract theory and natural property rights theory—especially those associated with a “Lockean proviso” or a Hobbesian justification of the state—have relied on the false empirical claim that Widerquist and McCall identify as “the Hobbesian hypothesis." That is, everyone is better off in a state society with a private property rights regime than everyone is, was, or would be in a society with neither of those institutions. Their book shows how the Hobbesian hypothesis has reappeared throughout the history of political thought since then and that it continues to be passed on in twenty-first century political theory. They argue that few of the philosophers who pass on the Hobbesian hypothesis offer any evidence to support it.

Widerquist and McCall present several chapters of evidence making that comparison and showing that the Hobbesian hypothesis is false: the least advantaged people in contemporary state society are actually worse off than the remaining native peoples who live outside the reach of the authority of the state or the property rights system. Therefore, if either of the two theories is to successfully justify the state and/or the property rights system, societies have to treat their disadvantaged individuals much better than they do now.

Widerquist and McCall's second book, the Prehistory of Private Property, debunks the beliefs that private property is somehow “natural,” that a capitalist system with strongly individualistic property rights is more consistent with negative liberty than other systems, and that economic equality is impossible or somehow in conflict with negative liberty. To do so they present a great deal of evidence about the types of land-holding institutions indigenous people have created throughout history and prehistory and about the government-sponsored violence that was necessary to establish the capitalist private property system.

== Other political and economic theories ==
Widerquist has argued that Thomas Piketty's observation that the rate of return on capital tends to exceed the growth rate in the economy should be seen as an outcome of the institutional setting rather than as a natural law of capitalism. Widerquist has also examined the effect of relaxing public choice theory’s assumption of self-interested behavior. He shows that many public choice problems exist as long as political actors are rational and disagree about what government should do, even if their disagreement stems from adherence to competing ethical theories rather than from competing self-interested wants.

Although Widerquist's work uses some sufficientarian assumptions, he criticized other aspects of sufficientarianism. He has done historical work examining the many different (and often contradictory) ways that Lockean appropriation theory has been interpreted and revised. He has written critically about wage subsidies as a redistributive strategy.

Widerquist outlines indepentarian property theory in his book, the Problem of Property. In addition to arguing for a basic income, the book suggests that taxation and regulation should be considered part of the purchase price of property. When society imposes rules privatizing resources, the people who become owners of resources must compensate people who therefore become nonowners both by paying "redistributive" taxes and obeying regulations.

== Books ==
- Michael Anthony Lewis and Karl Widerquist, 2002. Economics for Social Workers: The Application of Economic Theory to Social Policy and the Human Services, New York: Columbia University Press
- Karl Widerquist, Michael Anthony Lewis, and Steven Pressman (eds.), 2005. The Ethics and Economics of the Basic Income Guarantee, Aldershot, UK: Ashgate
- Karl Widerquist and Michael W. Howard (eds.) 2012. Alaska’s Permanent Fund Dividend: Examining its Suitability as a Model, New York: Palgrave Macmillan
- Karl Widerquist and Michael W. Howard (eds.) 2012. Exporting the Alaska Model: Adapting the Permanent Fund Dividend for Reform around the World, New York: Palgrave Macmillan
- Karl Widerquist, March 2013. Independence, Propertylessness, and Basic Income: A Theory of Freedom as the Power to Say No, New York: Palgrave Macmillan
- Karl Widerquist, Jose Noguera, Yannick Vanderborght, and Jurgen De Wispelaere (eds.), July 2013. Basic Income: An Anthology of Contemporary Research, Oxford: Wiley-Blackwell
- Karl Widerquist and Grant S. McCall. Prehistoric Myths in Modern Political Philosophy, Edinburgh: Edinburgh University Press, January 2017
- Karl Widerquist, A Critical Analysis of Basic Income Experiments for Researchers, Policymakers, and Citizens, New York: Palgrave Macmillan, December 2018
- Karl Widerquist and Grant S. McCall. 2021. The Prehistory of Private Property, Edinburgh: Edinburgh University Press
- Karl Widerquist, 2023. The Problem of Property: Taking the Freedom of Nonowners Seriously. New York: Palgrave Macmillan
