= Global basic income =

Sociopolitical concept

Global basic income or world basic income is the concept of giving everyone in the world a guaranteed minimum income of money on a regular basis. The proposal usually suggests that the basic income be unconditional. Global basic income is part of the wider discussion on basic income, which typically implemented or proposed at the national level. Pilot schemes are also run at city/region levels.

== History ==
Interest in the idea of a global basic income was raised in the 1970s by the Dutch artist Pieter Kooistra, who developed the "Uno" plan. From the 1980s, more people have started to think seriously about the proposals. Different suggestions on design and financing have been presented, among them monetary reform and "cap and dividend". The Global Basic Income Foundation, founded in 2000, brings together research and debate on the idea.

In 2016, the World Basic Income organisation was founded in the UK. It carried out research on the feasibility of a global basic income, building on the ideas from the previous decades. Its primary aim is to promote the idea of distributing $10/month to all the world's population thereby eradicating extreme poverty. It is focused on researching revenue streams emanating from the commons, such as taxes and fees on air, land and sea, as well as noting other potential revenue streams in a redistribution context.

== Events ==
Conferences have been organized by the Basic Income Earth Network and of USBIG.

The World Basic Income organisation held its first conference in February 2017 including speakers from the Global Income Foundation, BIEN, Share the World's Resources, CapGlobalCarbon, Hillel Steiner, Jonathan Bartley, John Merry, Manchester Migrant Solidarity, Max Harris and Belgian NGO "Eight".

== Individual advocates ==
=== Peter Kooistra ===
Peter Kooistra (1922–1998) was a Dutch artist, sculptor and graphic artist who was driven by the vision of making art accessible to all. He also used his creativity to develop various ideas and projects in the social and economic sphere. In the 1970s, when the images of famine in India spread across the world, he began to develop the idea of a global basic income.

=== Myron Frankman ===
Myron Frankman believes that global problems such as global poverty, needs global solutions. Based on this, he advocates a global federal system of active civic engagement from the local to the global scales, a world currency, global taxation, and global public finance.

=== Tadashi Okanouchi ===
According to Okanouchi a global basic income would mean:

- The abolition of wage slavery (or the proletariat as a social class).
- Elimination of the economic basis for patriarchy as well as nationalism.
- Elimination of the economic rationale for pollution.
- Elimination of financially constrained democratic inaction.

The movement for global basic income should therefore, according to Okanouchi, expect criticism from the capitalist class, patriarchal men, bureaucrats and politicians who in various ways are saving on today's systems.

== See also ==
- Right to an adequate standard of living
