= Wage subsidy =

Economic policy

A wage subsidy is a payment to workers by the state, made either directly or through their employers. Its purposes are to redistribute income and to obviate the welfare trap attributed to other forms of relief, thereby reducing unemployment. It is most naturally implemented as a modification to the income tax system.

The wage subsidy was proposed by A. C. Pigou in his book The Theory of Unemployment. It was subsequently advocated by American economists Edmund Phelps and Scott Sumner, American policy advisor Oren Cass, and British economist Tony Atkinson under the name of participation income.

The wage subsidy differs from universal basic income (UBI) in being limited in its scope to workers in paid employment, and does not generally seek to take the place of other benefits.

== Properties ==
Schematic representation of the wage subsidy

A wage subsidy is a payment in direct opposition to income tax. It can be presented as a modification to the operation of income tax below its threshold. In a conventional system the tax payable on an income y may be shown by the solid red line in the diagram, where θ is the threshold. Under a wage subsidy the employee's contribution to the state might be shown by the broken line below θ, being negative for workers on low income. s is the amount of the subsidy.

The same system may be viewed as having a wage-independent subsidy and a tax payment increasing in a certain way, or as a subsidy which varies with income, combined with a tax which varies in a different way.

It is not essential for a wage subsidy to be sufficient for a person to live on, as it is expected to be supplemented by income. If the pre-tax income of the lowest paid worker is y_{0} in the diagram, then the amount they have to live on is equal to the sum of y_{0} and the net amount the worker receives from the state through the tax/subsidy system; non-workers, on the other hand, are assumed to receive benefits determined separately. This differs from UBI in that the subsidy element is identified with the benefit paid to non-workers, and in which therefore the lowest paid worker receives enough to live on from the state and a further sum determined by their economic value to their employer. The increase in income from taking paid work may be more than is needed for incentive purposes.

In order for people to be motivated to take work and not feel demeaned by the compensation received, it is desirable for the post-tax income of the lowest paid worker under a wage subsidy system to be appreciably greater than the benefit they would receive when out of work. However, it would likely be less than the income the worker would receive under UBI; accordingly a wage subsidy system would impose a lower tax burden than UBI, which is the main reason for the preference shown for it by some authors.

A wage subsidy is well-suited for implementation through the income tax system, since its intended recipients are workers who are expected to be registered with the taxation authorities. It has been suggested that UBI should be implemented by the same means, which requires non-workers to also register and accounts for Friedman's choice of the term negative income tax for his UBI proposal.

=== Relationship to universal basic income systems ===
If a society decides to pay a fixed stipend per capita, it has the choice of making the payment unconditional or conditional (usually meaning for it to be limited to people in work, varyingly understood), and of making a full income payment (i.e. enough to live on) or just a partial subsidy (which needs to be supplemented by income from another source). Most governments do neither of these things, but instead pay benefits in cases of need. These options can be illustrated in a diagram.

	Full	Partial
Unconditional	full basic income	partial basic income
Conditional	?	wage subsidy
			tax and benefit

The cell with a question mark has no agreed name but has been discussed. Different arguments can be put forward for the various moves from cell to cell which can be made in the diagram; generally movement on the left-right axis is more significant than movement up/down.

== Outline of the operation of the wage subsidy and related systems ==
The wage subsidy and other systems

The graph shows the take-home salary y' for a worker as a function of the wage an employer would be willing to pay them for their services; y' is y adjusted for all taxes, benefits, and subsidies and for any state-funded basic income. This simplified model ignores complexities like child benefits and collective bargaining. The wage a worker commands can be identified with their marginal productivity.

Let u be the cost of living at what society considers to be the minimum reasonable standard and assume that both unemployment benefit and UBI would be set at this level. Guaranteed minimum income may be considered equivalent to unemployment benefit for the purposes of this discussion. Let θ be the income tax threshold in a conventional system and y_{0} be the marginal productivity of the least employable person in the workforce (excluding extreme cases). If y_{0} > u the market can be left to itself since no one will suffer undue hardship.

More reasonably it is assumed that y_{0} < u. The part of the graph to the left of y_{0} is ignored since it is essentially unpopulated (except for people electing to take y = 0). The important property of any function specifying in terms of y is its gradient: a steep function gives the worker an incentive to work, and a flat function takes the incentive away. Ideally, the function should be as steep as everywhere possible, (Note: This is a simplification. It is not the purpose of economics to make people work as hard as possible, but rather to enable society to find the optimum balance between work and leisure, as between any two commodities. A reduction in work incentives is therefore not automatically a bad thing.) but since redistribution is the only tool available, an operation that steepens the function at one point is likely to make it less steep somewhere else.

Consider the working of a conventional tax-and-benefit system shown by the orange line ("gmi"). A worker whose value to his or her employer lies between u and θ will take home exactly what they earn, receiving no benefits and paying no taxes. When the pre-tax salary increases beyond θ the take-home salary will increase less than pro-rata because of the deduction for tax.

The difficulty comes for a worker with an economic value less than u. Such a worker would have the choice of taking employment giving an income less than u on the 45° line in the diagram, or of going out of work so as to take a larger income. The system makes it advantageous to choose the latter option, so the part of the workforce between y_{0} and u is likely to be unemployed. This is reflected by the flatness of the orange line in the diagram.

Consider a UBI system illustrated by the purple line. It is never flat, so people always have an incentive to put in more work. But it is also very gently inclined so that workers may feel that additional effort is insufficiently rewarded. This is a consequence of the function being much higher at y_{0} than the alternative systems, and the money funding it has to be taken through the marginal taxation rate. Critics of UBI have attributed significant disincentive effects to it on this account.

Finally, consider the green line showing the working of a wage subsidy. This is flat on the left, but its flatness here is harmless since this part of the graph is unpopulated. Over the rest of the range it makes a compromise between the conventional system and UBI.

The involuntarily unemployed receive an income of u in all cases.

Not shown in the graph is the treatment of people who are voluntarily out of work ("surfers", (Note: The nickname "surfer" to refer to someone who prefers leisure to paid employment is due to Philippe Van Parijs's 1991 paper "Why Surfers should be fed: the Liberal Case for Unconditional Basic Income".) and also people performing unpaid domestic roles). Under UBI they would receive the y' basic income u; under a conventional tax-and-benefits system and under most forms of wage subsidy they would receive nothing. Under Atkinson's "Participation Income" some unpaid activities (such as voluntary work and housekeeping involving the supervision of children) would receive s. This is the sole difference between Atkinson's system and other forms of wage subsidy.

The behaviour of y' as a function of y in the vicinity of y = y_{0} may be taken as the defining feature of a wage subsidy system.

=== Partial basic income ===
A wage subsidy is equivalent to a system in which the payment u to unemployed workers is broken down into the sum of a partial basic income (PBI) s and an additional benefit u – s ; the take-home pay of employed workers will then be the sum of s and a proportion of their pre-tax wage. A partial basic income is paid to surfers and others choosing to stay out of employment, but its effect on people working or seeking employment is exactly the same as that of a wage subsidy.

== Advantages claimed ==
=== As a cure for unemployment ===
Unemployment was the main reason for wage subsidy. According to the classical theory of unemployment, unemployment is the consequence of distortions of the labour market at the low end of the salary range. A worker will be taken on by an employer so long as his or her economic value is greater than the cost of employment (which lies largely in salary costs but has other components). Distortions exist when there are circumstances preventing the payment of wages lower than some fixed value, with the result that potential workers whose value to their employer would be less than this are left unemployed. Removing distortions would eliminate the problem, but would not be socially acceptable because the lowest wage a worker could command might not be enough to avoid starvation, or at least might fall below the minimum considered an acceptable standard of living.

Wage subsidy advocates claim that it would allow the lowest paid workers to receive an adequate net salary even if their economic value to their employers was less than the socially acceptable minimum, and that their post-tax salary could exceed unemployment benefit by a sufficient margin for them to have an incentive to take work. The subsidy would avoid the welfare trap, but might have less effect against a wage minimum imposed through collective bargaining, since trades unions might respond to the measure by increasing their demands.

The effect on unemployment was Pigou's sole reason for considering the wage subsidy. He discussed the case in which it was limited to particular industries, but nothing he said precluded its more general application. He concluded that "[i]t is obvious that... the quantity of labour demanded must be increased in consequence of this type of subsidy".

=== As a means of redistribution ===
The subsidy s is a form of negative taxation. The distribution of income produced by the free market has no claims to optimality, so it is generally accepted that social wellbeing is maximised by providing negative taxation at some level. (Note: "Almost nowhere in the moral-philosophic literature is it deemed just that those [with low skills] should receive only [their] marginal product – no matter how low" – see the work cited by Phelps (p. 56).) The wage subsidy provides a systematic way of doing this within the workforce. Since it can be implemented through the taxation system, it avoids the stigma attached to benefits which is often considered to limit their effectiveness.

== The consequences of automation ==
The effect of automation on unemployment

If, under a standard tax-and-benefits system, a sum u is paid to everyone who is unable to obtain work, then those people whose marginal productivity (which determines their wage in a competitive market) is less than u will prefer to be unemployed. The number of people affected will tend to increase through the introduction of automation. A recent study concluded that "automation increases inequality in every scenario because it tends to displace the lowest-paid workers".

This is illustrated in the graph. The grey curve shows the distribution of the marginal productivity of labour through the workforce before the introduction of automation; the blue curve shows the same distribution after. The average marginal productivity is assumed to increase, the means being shown by the dashed lines, but at the same time the variance increases, as well as the proportion of the workforce whose marginal productivity is less than u, illustrated by the area under each curve to the left of u .

Hence a tax-and-benefit system may function as intended when first implemented, but the introduction of automation may lead to an increasing part of the workforce getting caught in the welfare trap.

== Relationship to the minimum wage ==
The wage subsidy has the same redistributional properties as the minimum wage, but American advocates draw particular attention to how it does not reinforce obstacles to full employment. Atkinson advocated introduction of a wage subsidy and increases in the minimum wage.

The minimum wage has the advantage that its funding line is invisible whereas revenue through taxation is conspicuous and often unpopular.

== Implementations of the wage subsidy ==
=== EITC (USA) ===
EITC is an American system which focuses on dependent children, but which also has elements of a wage subsidy. It has the drawback that payments are made long in arrears.

=== Prime pour l'emploi (France) ===
In 2001, the government of Lionel Jospin in France implemented a form of wage subsidy known as the Prime pour l'emploi, which is deducted from income tax ("impôt sur le revenu"") and can result, if this discount is greater than the tax, in a payment being made to the worker. The implementation of this negative tax has been welcomed both by economists on the left such as Thomas Piketty and by liberals like Alain Madelin. It was significantly increased by the Raffarin government in 2003, and later by the Dominique de Villepin government between 2005 and 2007.

== Eligibility criteria ==
One of the questions which arise in connection with a wage subsidy is who would be eligible to receive it. The extreme case of unlimited eligibility is self-defeating if unemployment benefit is retained, and if unemployment benefit is removed, it leads to UBI.

The criterion of being "in work" is unsatisfactory on account of its flexibility. A married couple may comprise a breadwinner and a person who keeps house and is not conventionally paid. But if the breadwinner paid a nominal sum for the housekeeper's services, and if being in paid work was the eligibility criterion for the wage subsidy, then the couple would be enriched by the quantity s. This subsidy does not further the aims of the scheme.

Atkinson takes an inclusive view of eligibility, whereas Phelps is exclusive, limiting the subsidy to the employees of "qualifying firms" and thereby excluding the self-employed.

Any decision taken here runs the risk of arbitrariness, of enabling abuse or inducing perverse incentives, or of requiring an intrusive bureaucracy. Friedman's aversion to the latter is one of his arguments in support of UBI.

== See also ==
- Universal inheritance
- List of basic income models
- Minimum wage
