= Omitara railway station =

Railway station in Namibia

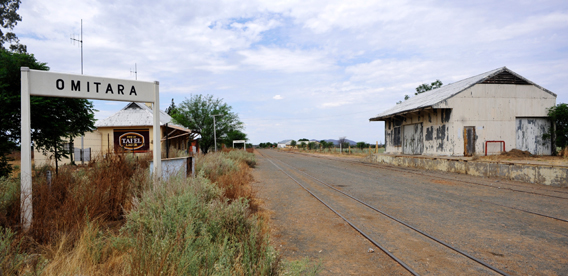
- Omitara railway station

General information
- Location: Omitara; Namibia
- System: TransNamib Railway
Location

Omitara railway station is a railway station serving the settlement of Omitara in Namibia. It is part of the TransNamib Railway, located along the Windhoek to Gobabis line.
