= Sufficientarianism =

Theory of distributive justice

Sufficientarianism is one of several main theories of distributive justice, concerned with a view of justice that emphasises the idea that all should have enough. In contrast to egalitarianism, the American philosopher Harry Frankfurt has suggested that when looking at economic distributions, the morally important thing is that all should have enough, not that all would have the same. John Roemer has suggested that this might be thought of as maximising the numbers of those who have enough (2004, p. 278).
