= Clube de Autores =

Latin American self-publishing platform

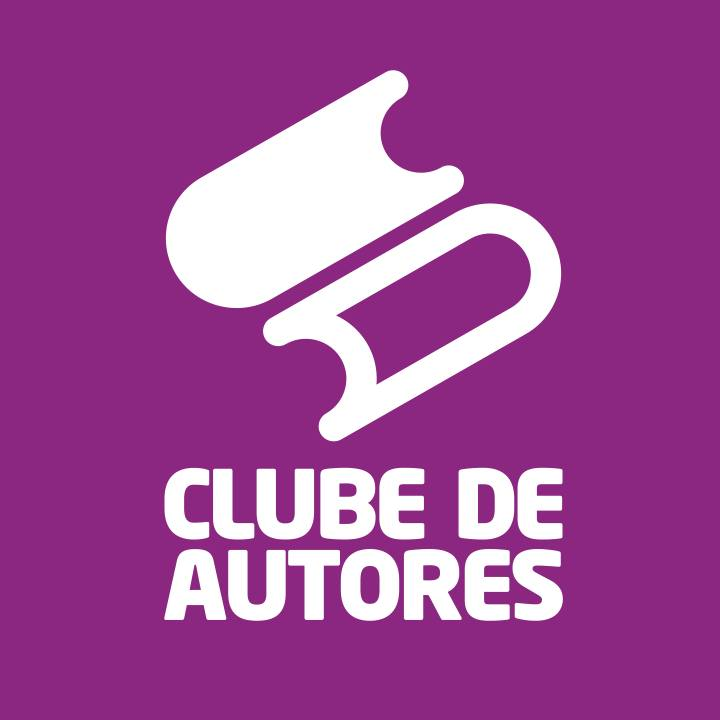
Logo of Clube de Autores

Clube de Autores (founded 2009) is a major self-publishing platform in Latin America, with a main focus on the Brazilian market. It is headquartered in Joinville, Santa Catarina, Brazil.

Clube de Autores claims to publish about 10% of the books in Brazil.
