= Omitara =

- Settlement
- Location in Namibia
- Coordinates: 22°16′S 18°1′E
- Country: Namibia
- Region: Omaheke Region
- Constituency: Okorukambe Constituency
- Time zone: UTC+2 (South African Standard Time)
- Climate: BSh

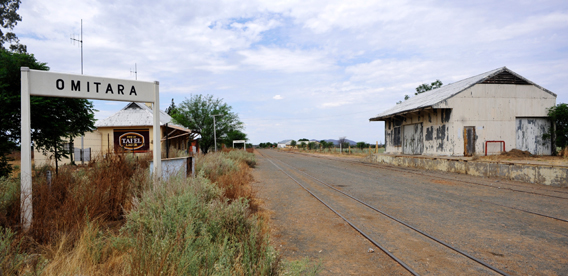
Station Omitara, Namibia

Omitara is a settlement in the Okorukambe electoral constituency in the Omaheke Region of Namibia. Together with the adjacent village of Otjivero — the two places are often referred to as one — it had a population of approximately 1,200 as of October 2008. Otjivero and Omitara railway station are two contiguous TransNamib railway stops en route from Windhoek to Gobabis.

== History ==
Upon Independence of Namibia Omitara was a village, governed by a seven-seat village council. The 1992 Namibian local election was contested only by SWAPO, and all seven of its candidates were duly elected. The village status of Omitara was revoked before the 1998 local authority elections, so that it came under the governance of the Omaheke Regional Council.

== Economy and Infrastructure ==
=== Basic Income Grant project ===
In 2008 and 2009, Omitara and Otjivero were the site of a basic income grant test project. Every person under the retirement age of 60 was given 100 Namibian dollars (Namibian pensioners get an independent allowance of 550N$ per month). The follow-up study, published in October 2008, reported that poverty-related crime, malnutrition rates among children and school drop outs had decreased since the inception of the project. The coalition advocating for a BIG in Namibia was led by labour and church organisations, hoping for a nationwide implementation of this grant to alleviate the worst effects of poverty in the country. The government of Namibia has however not supported this initiative.

After the last payment was scheduled for December 2009, a bridging allowance of 80 N$ per month was introduced in order not to "let residents slide back into the dehumanising levels of poverty that they experienced before". This bridging allowance was paid until the end of 2011 when the BIG coalition ran out of money. Payments resumed again in July 2014 with support from the Waldensian Church in Italy.

=== Otjovero Dam ===
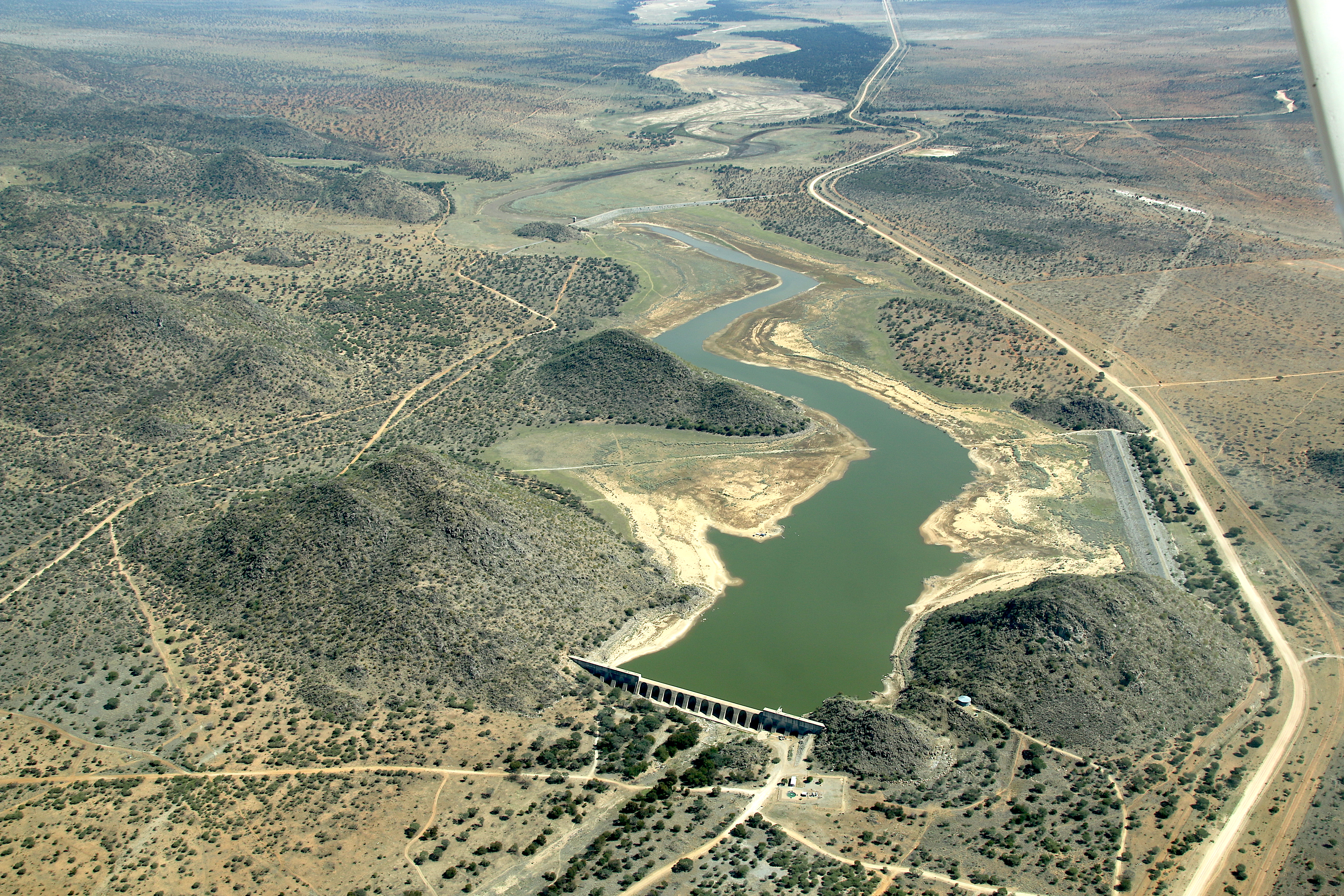
Otjivero Dams aerial view 2018

West of Otjivero and Omitara the Otjivero Dams are situated. They comprise a main dam and a silt dam and store the water of the White Nossob River.

== See also ==
- Basic income around the world
- Mincome basic income project in Manitoba, Canada
