= Negative income tax =

Proposed tax reform

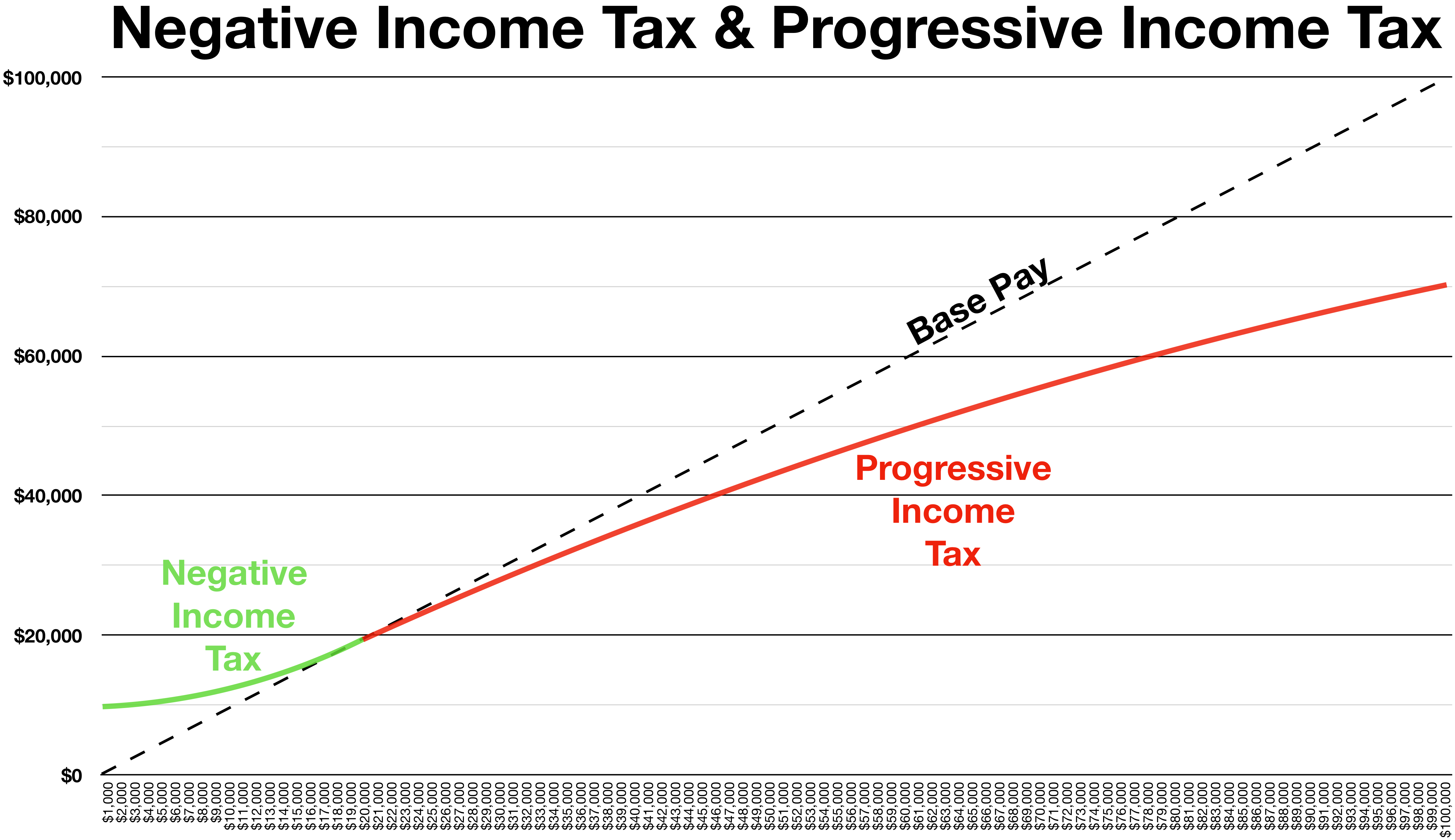
One's income after taxes is shown by the green line for lower incomes and by the red line for higher incomes. Negative income tax Progressive income tax Base pay

In economics, a negative income tax (NIT) is a system which reverses the direction in which tax is paid for incomes below a certain level; in other words, earners above that level pay money to the state while earners below it receive money. NIT was proposed by British writer and politician Juliet Rhys-Williams while working on the Beveridge Report in the early 1940s and popularized by American economist Milton Friedman in the 1960s as a system in which the state makes payments to poor people when their income falls below a threshold, while taxing them on income above that threshold.

Together with Friedman, supporters of NIT also included James Tobin, Joseph A. Pechman, Jim Gray and even then-President Richard Nixon, who suggested implementation of modified NIT in his Family Assistance Plan. After the increase in popularity of NIT, an experiment sponsored by the US government was conducted between 1968 and 1982 on effects of NIT on labour supply, income, and substitution effects.

== Generic negative income tax ==
The view that the state should supplement the income of the poor has a long history (see Universal basic income § History). Such payments are called benefits if they are limited to those who lack other income, or are conditional on specific needs (such as number of children), but are called negative taxes if they continue to be received as a supplement by workers who have income from other sources. The withdrawal of benefits when the recipient ceases to satisfy a firm eligibility criterion is often seen as giving rise to the welfare trap.

The level of support provided to the poor by a negative tax is thought of as parametrically adjustable according to the opposing claims of economic efficiency and distributional justice. Friedman's NIT lacks this adjustability owing to the constraint that other benefits would be largely discontinued; hence a wage subsidy is more representative of generic negative income tax than is Friedman's specific Negative Income Tax.

In 1975 the United States implemented a negative income tax for the working poor through the earned income tax credit. A 1995 survey found that 78% of American economists supported (with or without provisos) the incorporation of a negative income tax into the welfare system.

=== Theoretical development ===
Income redistribution expressed equivalently as a negative income tax or as a basic income

Theoretical discussion of negative taxation began with Vilfredo Pareto, who first made a formal distinction between allocative efficiency (i.e. the market's ability to give people what they want subject to their incomes) and distributive justice (i.e. the question of whether these incomes are fair in the first place). He sought to show that market economies allocated resources optimally within the income distributions they give rise to, but accepted that there was nothing optimal about these distributions themselves. He concluded that if society wished to maximise wellbeing, it should let market forces govern production and exchange and then correct the result by 'a second distribution... performed in conformity with the workings of free competition'. His argument was that a direct transfer obtained a given redistributive effect with the least possible reduction of economic efficiency, and was preferable to government interference in the market (as happens in modern economies through the minimum wage) which damages efficiency by introducing distortions.

Abram Bergson and Paul Samuelson (drawing on earlier work by Oscar Lange) gave a formal statement to Pareto's claims. They showed that the optimum of efficiency associated with market competition fell short of maximum wellbeing as reflected by a social welfare function only through distributional effects, and that a true optimum could be obtained if the state were to transfer income through 'lump sum taxes or bounties', where 'bounties' are negative taxes and 'lump sum' is Samuelson's term for a hypothetical redistribution with no distortionary consequences.

=== Optimal taxation theory ===
It follows from the Bergson/Samuelson analysis that any proposed measure (including the proposal to leave things as they are) can be assessed according to the balance it achieves between three factors: (i) the improvement in overall wellbeing from a more equitable distribution; (ii) the loss in economic efficiency due to the distortions introduced; and (iii) the administrative costs. The first of these cannot easily be equated to a sum of money; the last is unlikely to be a dominant factor. Hence redistribution should be pursued up to the point at which any further (non-monetary) benefits from a more equal distribution would be offset by the resulting monetary loss of economic efficiency.

The Bergson/Samuelson theory was developed in a broadly utilitarian framework. A fourth factor could be added in the form of a moral claim derived from present ownership or legitimate earning. Considerable weight was placed on this during the Enlightenment but Hume and the Utilitarians rejected it. It is seldom mentioned nowadays but cannot be dismissed a priori as a relevant consideration.

The theoretical study of the trade-off between equity and efficiency was initiated by James Mirrlees in 1971. Eytan Sheshinski summarised:

In various examples calculated by Mirrlees, the optimal income-tax schedule appears to be approximately linear with a negative tax at low incomes.

== Friedman's NIT ==
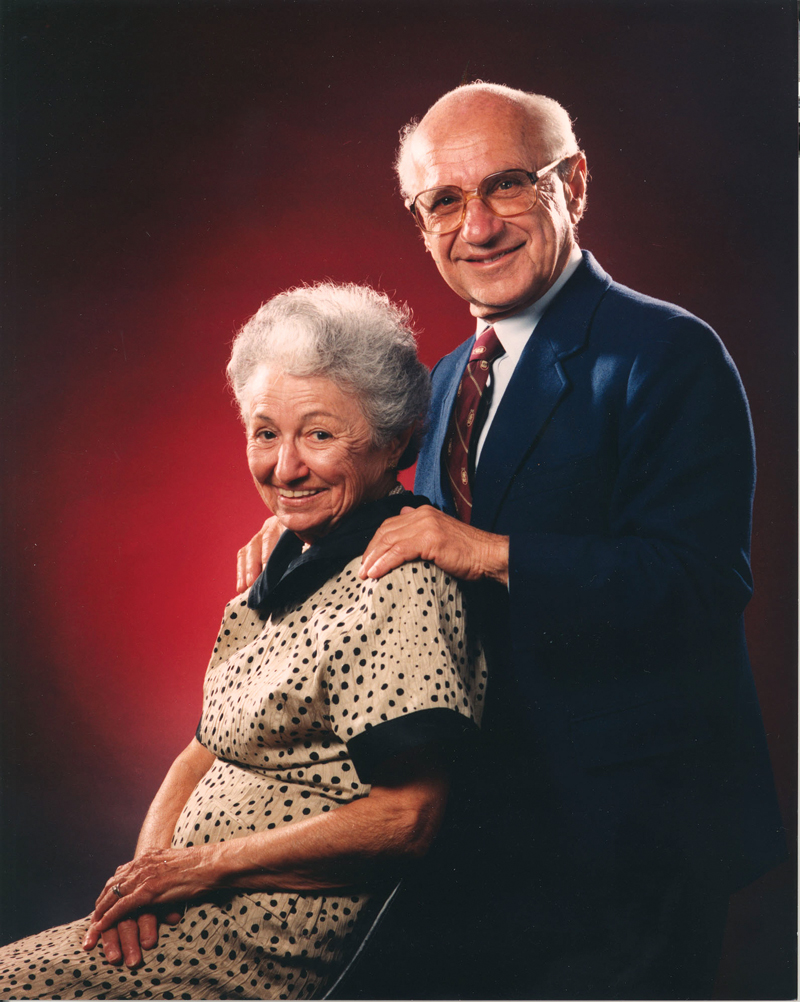
Rose and Milton Friedman

"Negative Income Tax" became prominent in the United States as a result of advocacy by Milton and Rose Friedman, who first put forward a concrete proposal in 1962 in a brief section of their book Capitalism and Freedom. Their system is equivalent in its operation to most forms of universal basic income (UBI). (Note: See that article for more detail, particularly the section § Basic income vs negative income tax for the equivalence.)

In the aforementioned work, Friedman provides five benefits of the negative income tax. Firstly, Friedman argues that it provides cash which the individual sees as the best possible way of support. Secondly, it targets poverty directly through income rather than through general old-age benefits or farm programs. Thirdly, negative income tax could in his opinion replace all supporting programs present at that time and provide one universal program. Fourthly, in theory the cost of negative income tax can be lower than the cost of existing programs mainly due to lower administrative costs. Lastly, the program should not distort the market in the way minimum wage laws or tariffs do.

Friedman envisioned the NIT followingly in an interview in 1968: Considering family A of four with income $4000 and Family B of four with income $2000. If the break-even income would be $3000, after filing the tax report, family A would pay the tax on $1000 while family B would be entitled to receive, assuming the 50% NIT rate, $500. Meaning half of the difference between what they earn and the break-even income. Therefore, a family with $0 income would be entitled to receive $1500 in subsidy. Friedman argued NIT would not destroy the incentive to work, as compared to guaranteed income programmes (GIP) with 100% effective marginal tax rate, i.e. with the GIP workers lose $1 of subsidy for each $1 increase in wage.

In his 1966 "View from the Right" paper Milton Friedman remarked that his proposal...

has been greeted with considerable (though far from unanimous) enthusiasm on the left and with considerable (though again far from unanimous) hostility on the right. Yet, in my opinion, the negative income tax is more compatible with the philosophy and aims of the proponents of limited government and maximum individual freedom than with the philosophy and aims of the proponents of the welfare state and greater government control of the economy.

Friedman also elaborated and provided two reasons for the hostility from the right. Firstly, he mentions that the right is frightened due to the introduction of a guaranteed minimum income the poor would have a disincentive to improve their well-being. Secondly, the right is not certain about the political outcomes of the NIT, as there exist threats that there will be an upward pressure on the break-even incomes among politicians.

The Friedmans together promoted the idea to a wider audience in 1980 in their book and television series Free to Choose. It has often been discussed (and endorsed) by economists but never fully implemented. Advantages claimed for it include:

- Alleviating poverty
- Eliminating the "welfare trap"
- Streamlining the benefits system.

The alleviation of poverty was mentioned in Capitalism and Freedom, where Friedman argued that in 1961 the US government spent around 33 billion on welfare payments e.g. old age assistance, social security benefit payments, public housing, etc. excluding mainly veterans' benefits and other allowances. Friedman recalculated the spending between 57 million consumers in 1961 and came to the conclusion that it would have financed 6000 dollars per consumer to the poorest 10% or 3000 dollars to the poorest 20%. Friedman also found out that a program raising incomes of the poorest 20% to the lowest income of the rest would cost the US government less than half of the amount spent in 1961.

The Friedmans' writings were influential for a period with the American political right, and in 1969 President Richard Nixon proposed a Family Assistance Program which had points in common with UBI. Milton Friedman originally supported Nixon's proposal but eventually testified against it on account of its perverse labor incentive effects. Friedman was mainly opposed to the idea that Nixon's program would be combined with existing programs at that time, rather than replacing the existing programs as Friedman originally proposed.

Meanwhile, support for negative income tax was increasing among the political left. Paul Samuelson argued in Newsweek that it was an idea whose time had come, and more than 1,200 academic economists signed a petition in support of it. Friedman withheld his signature, possibly on the grounds that the petition did not explicitly describe the new measure as a replacement rather than a supplement to existing programs.

As civic disorder diminished in the US, support for negative income tax waned among the American right. Instead the doctrine came to be particularly associated with the political left, generally under the name "basic income" or derivatives. It received further impetus in Europe with the founding of the Basic Income Earth Network (BIEN) in 1986. Asked in 2000 how he viewed a basic income "compared to the alternative of a negative income tax", Friedman replied that the measures were not alternatives and that basic income was "simply another way to introduce a negative income tax", giving a numerical example of their equivalence.

== Experiments on the effect of NIT on the labour supply ==
The experiments on NIT have been conducted in the US between years 1968 and 1982 and the expenditures were 225 million recalculated for the 1984 value. The first results have been that the husbands reduced labour supply by about the equivalent of two weeks of full-time employment. On the other hand, wives and single female heads reduced it by three weeks and the youth reduced the labour supply by four weeks.

The experiments were conducted in the following states:

- New Jersey (1968–1972) observing 1,357 families for a period of 3 years and testing the guarantee levels from 0.5 to 1.25 of the poverty line and tax rates from 0.3 to 0.7.
- Rural Iowa and Carolina (1969–1973) involving 809 families for a period of 3 years and testing guarantee levels from 0.5 to 1.00 and tax rates from 0.3 to 0.7.
- Gary, Indiana (1971–1974) observing 1,780 families for a period of 3 years and testing guarantee levels from 0.75 to 1.00 and tax rates from 0.4 to 0.6.
- Seattle–Denver (1971–1982) the biggest of the four experiments, containing three lengths of treatments (3, 5 and 10 years) and testing guarantee levels from 0.95 to 1.40 and a non-constant tax rate.

It has been concluded that the most relevant sample size is from the Seattle-Denver experiment, and the experiment should yield the most precise estimates. Importantly, the results may vary not only due to sample sizes but also due to different design, methods of analysis or operations.

=== Results of the individual experiments ===
The individual results were districted into four categories: husbands, wives, single female heads, the youth. Firstly, it was noted that there is an unambiguous decrease in labour supply as a result of NIT and that there exists a pattern among each of the groups. The results show that husbands are the least responsive to NIT in terms of withdrawal from labour force while the youth is the most responsive. Moreover, the percentage responses are from 5–25% equalling 1–5 weeks of full-time work. The employment rate ranges from 1 to 10%. It is however important to note that while on one hand the youth was the most responsive to NIT, on the other hand the decrease in labour supply was equalled by increase in school attendance. Moreover, the chances of completing school education also rose notably in New Jersey by 5% and in Seattle-Denver by 11%.

Considering results from the Seattle-Denver experiment, it can be shown that the two-parent families that received $2,700 decreased their earnings by almost $1,800. Therefore, spending $2,700 on transfers to two-parent families in Seattle-Denver increased their income by only $900. This raised the question whether taxpayers would be willing to pay $3 in order to increase the income of aforementioned families by $1.

=== Implications to the real world ===
An attempt was made to synthesise the results and provide a nation-wide estimate of the effects of NIT in the US using two plans, one with 75% and the other with 100% guarantee and 50% and 70% tax rates. The corresponding programmes would cost between 6.7 and 16.3 billion dollars, (-5.3) to 4.5 billion dollars, 55.5 to 61.1 billion dollars and 15.4 to 25.7 billion dollars (value expressed in 1985 dollars) respectively. These are net costs, meaning how much more the NIT would cost relative to the welfare programmes in effect at the time. For the latter two options, i.e. 100% guarantee with either 50% or 70% tax rate, it would represent an increase in spending equal to 1.5 percent of the gross national product (GNP) and 0.4-0.6 percent of GNP. The net increase could be financed by increase in federal taxes from 2 to 4 percent. While the cost of eliminating poverty seemed attainable, the issue of decreased earnings and self-support among families remained prevalent. Hence, the issues likely caused the decrease in interest in implementation of NIT, as the work of donor is a bit higher than the work of the recipient and can potentially lead to free riding which would destroy the entire framework.

== Comparison to universal basic income ==
A negative income tax is structurally similar to a universal basic income, as both are capable of achieving the exact same net transfer of income. However, the two mechanisms may differ in the cost to the government, the timing of payments, and the psychological perceptions from taxpayers.

== See also ==
- List of basic income models
- Basic income around the world
- Wage subsidy
- Welfare trap
