= Universal basic income by country =

Overview of the current status of universal basic income around the world

Universal basic income (UBI) is discussed in many countries. This article gives an overview of national and regional debates.

Basic income by country

- Australia
- Belgium
- Brazil
- Bulgaria
- Canada
- Czech Republic
- Finland
- France
- Germany
- Greece
- Hungary
- Iceland
- India
- Iran
- Iraq
- Ireland
- Japan
- Macau
- Namibia
- Netherlands
- New Zealand
- Norway
- Portugal
- Slovakia
- South Korea
- Spain
- Switzerland
- United Kingdom
- United States

== Africa ==
=== Kenya ===
Starting from November 2017, the UBI initiative run by the GiveDirectly non-profit has been implemented in a disadvantaged village of Kenya, it was set to run for 12 years.

=== Namibia ===
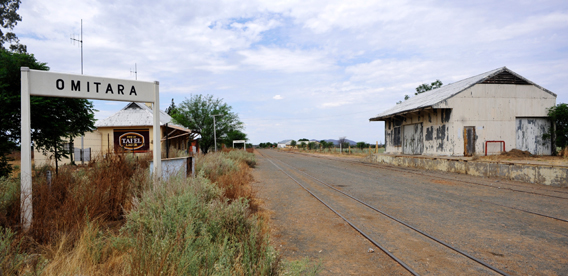
Omitara, one of the two poor villages in Namibia where basic income was tested from 2008 to 2009

From January 2008 to December 2009, a pilot project with basic income grant was implemented in the Namibian villages of Otjievero and Omitara. The project was organized by the Namibian Basic Income Grant Coalition. It was mainly funded by a German Protestant church, by individual contributions of German and Namibian citizens and by contributions of the German Ministry for Cooperation. The amount paid out per head was N$100 (8% of the average income, around US$12).

After the launch, the project was found to have significantly reduced child malnutrition and increased school attendance. It was also found to have increased the community's income significantly above the actual amount from the grants as it allowed citizens to partake in more productive economic activities. The project team stated that this increase in economic activity contradicts critics' claims that a basic income would lead to laziness and dependence. After the conclusion of the pilot project phase, a monthly bridging-allowance of N$80 (around US$10) was paid regularly to all who participated in the pilot until March 2012.

One of the conclusions of the project was that, even with the restriction that only residents of the village for over a year since the pilot's start could benefit from the grant, there was a significant migration towards Otjivero-Omitara, despite the fact that the migrants would not receive the grant. The project concluded that this phenomenon reveals the need to introduce such basic-income systems as a universal national grant, in order to avoid migration to particular regions, towns or households.

Another finding of the project was that after the introduction of the pilot, overall crime rates fell by 42%, specifically stock theft, which fell by 43% and other theft by nearly 20%. These conclusions are derived from two empirical studies conducted by the Basic Income Grant Coalition. One study that covers the first 6 months of the project and a second study about the first 12 months of the project. No further empirical studies or project assessments have been published. However, there is no public access to the project database. Something the project representatives confirmed in Namibian press, including a justification of it.

In May 2012, the community leader of Otjivero-Omitara, Ernst Gariseb, told a journalist of a Namibian newspaper: "Since two decades we are sitting here without work, development and perspectives." The journalist concluded: "Despite the support of the BIG there is not any development to be seen in Otjivero."

=== South Africa ===
According to Jeremy Seekings of the University of Cape Town, basic income activists have managed to keep the proposal alive in the South African debate ever since the 1990s, but the proposals have nonetheless not gained a lot of support within the policy-making and political elite. Nor has the idea gained a lot of public support. As he sees it, both the elite and the public remain opposed to the extension of social grants to working-age adults. He also argues that the basic income activism is a rather intellectual enterprise, done by only a few, who are lacking strong organisational or popular bases. But on the other hand, the COVID-19-pandemic (of 2020 and 2021) has forced the government to act, to go some steps in the direction of basic income:

Quasi-basic income during the COVID-19 pandemic

The Minister for Social Development Lindiwe Zulu, announced in April 2020 that the government were about to pay out a basic income grant because of the pandemic. Not to everyone, but to everyone of working age that do not receive any other economic help from the government. The grant, R350 per month, started to be paid out in May and ended in October 2020. In October, just before the grant was ending, SA Communist Party (SACP) leader Blade Nzimande called on the government to convert the grant into a "universal basic income guarantee". He argued the grant was offering a survival lifeline to millions. Mary Burton, writing an opinion piece for Business Day in September 2020, also argues for the government to introduce a real basic income. She writes:

This is not at all the same thing as the temporary "Covid-19 grant" recently introduced to address the situation of unemployed people between the ages of 18 and 59. The difficulties experienced by the department of social development in administering this grant have shown how complex that system is, where checks have to be carried out as to whether the applicants meet all the necessary criteria to qualify for it. Nevertheless, it has brought vital help to millions of people, and has provided useful lessons both in terms of administration and as an illustration of its benefit.

Zulu, however, is also pushing for a real basic income. She is hoping that it can be introduced in March 2021, but for that to happen the Finance Ministry of South Africa must also be on board with the plan.

Political parties in favour of (a real) basic income:

- The Democratic Alliance

== Asia ==
=== East Asia ===
==== Japan ====
In Japan, New Party Nippon included a basic income proposal in their manifesto in 2009 (the party dissolved in 2015). Of the currently active and registered political parties in Japan, the Greens Japan support a universal basic income, as do Reiwa Shinsengumi whenever inflation is below 2%. A number of economists in Japan also support UBI, such as Toru Yamamori and Kaori Katada.

==== Macau ====
Macau has distributed funds to all residents, permanent and non-permanent, since 2008, as part of the region's Wealth Partaking Scheme. In 2014, the government distributed 9,000 patacas (approx. US$1,127) to each permanent resident, and 5,400 patacas ($676) to non-permanent residents.

==== South Korea ====
- In South Korea the Youth Allowance Program was started in 2016 in the City of Seongnam, which would give all 24-year-old citizens 250,000 won (~US$215) every quarter in the form of a "local currency" that could only be used in local businesses. This program was later expanded to the entire Province of Gyeonggi in 2018.
- The Socialist Party supported basic income, along with delegate Geum Min in South Korea.
- The Basic Income Party was founded in January 2020.

=== South Asia ===
==== India ====
Two basic income pilot projects have been underway in India since January 2011 in partnership with UNICEF, British researcher Guy Standing and Indian activist Renana Jhabvala, providing 200 rupees per month per adult and 100 rupees per child. According to the first communication of the pilot projects, positive results have been found. Villages spent more on food and healthcare, children's school performance improved in 68 percent of families, time spent in school nearly tripled, personal savings tripled, and new business startups doubled.

=== West Asia (Middle East) ===
==== Israel ====
In 2018, Israel's non-profit GoodDollar started building a global economic framework for universal, sustainable, and scalable universal basic income using blockchain technology. The project raised $1 million from eToro and involved a peer-to-peer money transfer network based on universal basic income to provide money to those most in need worldwide.

==== Iran ====
Iran was the first country to introduce a national basic income in Autumn 2010. It is paid to all citizens and replaces the subsidies of petrol, fuel, and other supplies that the country had for decades in order to reduce inequality and poverty. In 2010, the sum corresponded to about 40 U.S. dollars per person per month, 480 U.S. dollars per year for a single individual, which could reach to $2300 per year for a family of five.

The initial public and political reaction to the program was negative. Local press claimed that the poor were abandoning their jobs due to the extra money, and the Government has considered introducing means testing to reduce the costs of the program.

A first assessment of the experiences in Iran was provided in 2011 by H. Talabani. Another assessment published in 2017 found no evidence that cash transfers recipients reduced their participation in the labor force.

== Europe ==
=== Belgium ===
Historically in Belgium, the most active group promoting basic income is the movement Vivant and the philosopher Philippe Van Parijs, who founded the Basic Income European network (BIEN) in 1987. A Belgian basic income network affiliated to the BIEN was founded in 2012 in Brussels.

=== Bulgaria ===
In December 2014, one year after the European basic income initiative, Bulgarian Union for Direct Democracy, a new party, was created. Besides direct democracy the party also included basic income in its program.

=== Czech Republic ===
The first bigger discussion on universal basic income in the Czech Republic was initiated by philosophers and social scientists Marek Hrubec and Martin Brabec. Later, they published with Philippe Van Parijs a book "Všeobecný základní příjem. Právo na lenost, nebo na přežití?" ("Universal Basic Income. Right to Laziness, or Right to Survival?"). In 2013, activists and social scientists joined the European Citizens' Initiative for Unconditional Basic Income, and have created a campaign to support unconditional basic income. In the Czech Republic, unconditional basic income is supported by many individuals, NGOs (Alternativa zdola, ProAlt, Levá perspektiva, for example), and political parties. It is the program of the Green Party, the Communist Party, the Pirate Party, and the Party of Democratic Socialism. It is also supported by many Social Democrats.

=== Finland ===
In the 1970s, Finnish researchers were inspired by Milton Friedman's proposal for a negative income tax.

In 1994, Osmo Soininvaara wrote a book advocating basic income. The Young Finns advocated basic income in the 1990s. The Centre Party began advocating liberalization of labor markets and basic income in the end of the 1990s.

In 2003, the Research Institute of the Finnish Economy published the book "Kansantalous 2028" ("Economy 2028"), which concluded that a basic income and a flat income tax rate would be a good solution.

In 2007, Kansallinen sivistysliitto published the paper "Sisällä vai ulkona – kohti perustuloa?", which advocated basic income.

From 2007 to 2011, the centre-right government was interested in adopting a basic income system. However, the SDP and trade unions affiliated with the party were aggressively opposed to basic income.

In 2013, Libera Foundation published a detailed proposal for Life Account ("perustili"), a savings account that allows owners to withdraw money (up to a monthly maximum) even if their balance is negative. Everyone would receive the account at the age of 18 and the initial balance would be 20,000 euros. The initial balance would replace the current student grant system. Life account would resemble basic income.

In May 2015, the Sipilä Cabinet committed to carrying out a Basic Income experiment as part of a government program. In November 2015, Kela, the Finnish Social Insurance Institution launched a preliminary study to identify the model for implementing the experiment.

In 2018, Finland ended the universal basic income experiment. The experiment was temporary.

=== France ===
==== Advocates ====
Some of the most well-known defenders of basic income in France are Benoit Hamon, Yoland Bresson, André Gorz, Baptiste Mylondo, Yann Moulier-Boutang, Toni Negri, Jean-Marc Ferry, Ignacio Ramonet, Jacques Marseille, Christine Boutin, Dominique de Villepin, Karima Delli, Jean Desessard and Yves Cochet. The think tank Centre des Jeunes Dirigeants (CJD) ("Young policymakers trust") also call for a basic income of 400 euros per citizen, per month. The CJD's and Christine Boutin's basic income proposals are based on Marc de Basquiat financing model, which demonstrates a way of financing a basic income of about 500 euros for every adult and 250 per child, while other advocates such as Baptiste Mylondo and Jacques Marseille promote a "high enough" basic income, around 750 euros. However, unlike Mylondo and Marseille, De Basquiat's model does not reduce any pension, housing or unemployment benefits.

=== Germany ===
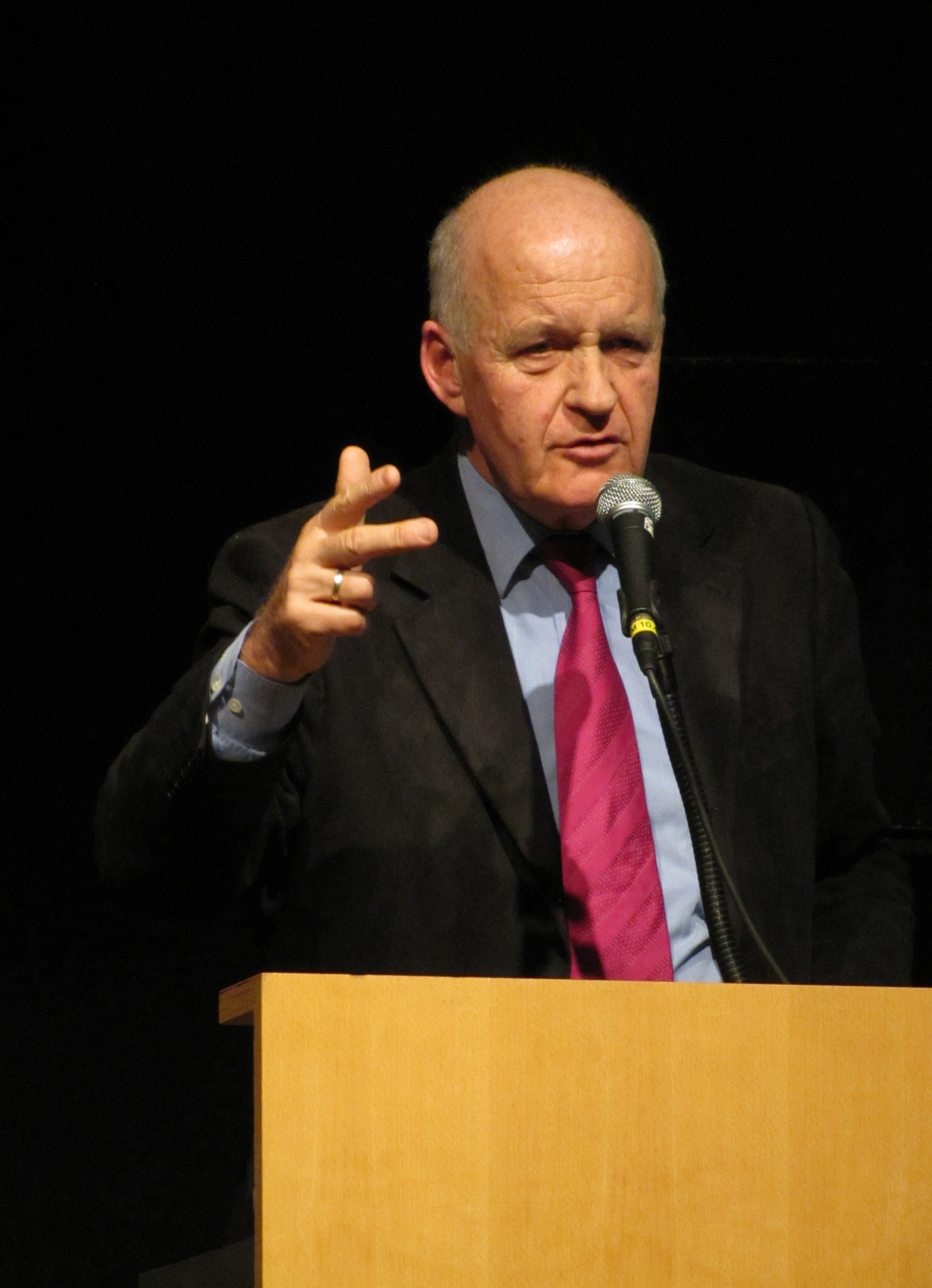
Götz W. Werner, a German proponent of basic income

The debate about basic income started to grow in the 1980s when groups of unemployed people came out in favor of the reform. For many years the idea was only supported openly by some academics, such as Claus Offe, and a few politicians and organizations. However, after the Hartz reforms, introduced by the Cabinet of Gerhard Schröder in 2003–2005 and subsequently modified, a debate regarding basic income was triggered. In 2009, Susanne Wiest, a house wife, made a presentation in the German Parliament about the basic income petition she had initiated and which received support from 52,973 people. In 2010, there were several basic income demonstrations, the biggest in Berlin. In 2011, the Pirate Party decided to advocate for a basic income alongside minimum wages. Among the political parties in Germany, the Pirate Party officially endorsed basic income in 2011. Inside the Christian Democratic Union, Dieter Althaus proposes a basic income model. A group led by Katja Kipping also promotes basic income inside the leftist party Die Linke. Also, within the Social Democratic Party of Germany, the Rhein-Erft-group favors basic income since 2010. Within The Greens there are also many advocates. In 2016 the Basic Income Alliance was formed, a single-issue political party that advocates for a universal basic income.

A commission of the German parliament discussed basic income in 2013 and concluded that it is "unrealizable" because:

- it would cause a significant decrease in the motivation to work among citizens, with unpredictable consequences for the national economy
- it would require a complete restructuring of the taxation, social insurance and pension systems, which will cost a significant amount of money
- the current system of social help in Germany is regarded as more effective because it is more personalized: the amount of help provided depends on the financial situation of the recipient; for some socially vulnerable groups, the basic income could be insufficient
- it would cause a vast increase in immigration
- it would cause a rise in the shadow economy
- the corresponding rise of taxes would cause more inequality: higher taxes would cause higher prices of everyday products, harming the finances of poor people
- no viable way to finance basic income in Germany was found

In August 2023, Mein Grundeinkommen calculated that a universal basic income of €1,200 a month would be affordable for every adult in Germany.

Hamburg is the first city and state in Germany where citizens can vote on a universal basic income during the 2025 Hamburg universal basic income referendum.

=== Greece ===
Though the idea of basic income is not well known in Greece, several economists have worked on the topic. In 2010, the now dissolved liberal party Drasi supported a proposal for a basic pension scheme, aiming at simplifying the hundreds of pension schemes in a country being hurt by the debt crisis and pressured by the troika to balance its public budget. Manos Matsaganis and Chrysa Leventi co-authored a study that demonstrate the feasibility of such a proposal.

Other heterodox proposals suggest that a Greek exit from the eurozone could be an opportunity to implement a "monetary dividend" for every Greek citizen as a way to manage the financial collapse of the country.

The economist and leader of the MeRA25 party, Yanis Varoufakis, is a supporter of a universal basic income that is funded from returns on capital rather than taxation, where "a percentage of capital stock (shares) from every initial public offering (IPO) be channelled into a Commons Capital Depository, with the associated dividends funding a universal basic dividend (UBD)."

=== Hungary ===
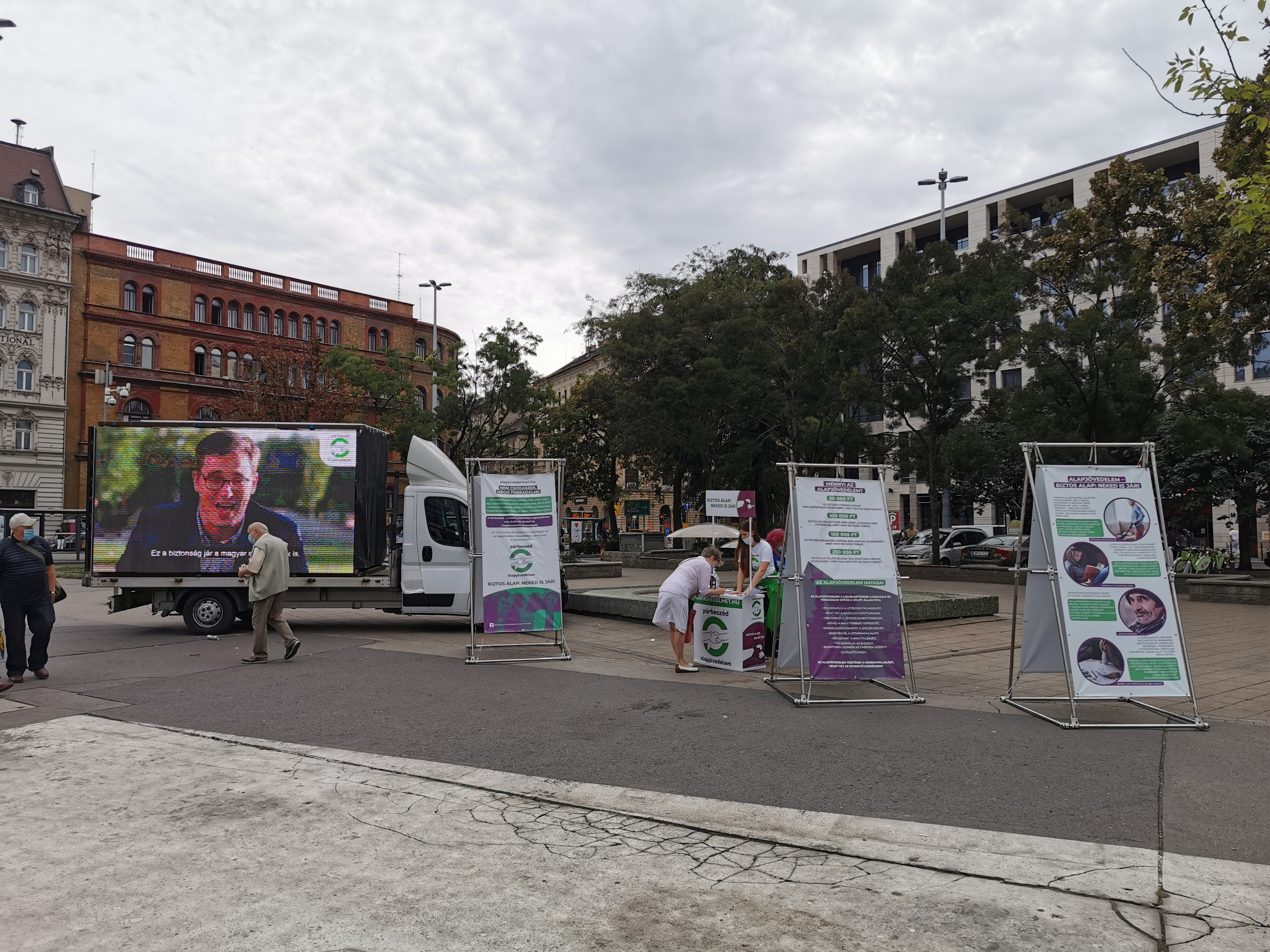
A universal basic income stall and displays in Budapest, Hungary, September 2020

Unconditional basic income is endorsed in Hungary by the FNA Group (formed in 2011) and the Hungarian Pirate Party. In 2014 the LÉT workgroup published a proposal, which involved paying 50,000 HUF per month to every adult and 25,000 HUF to every child; 90% of the cost would have been covered by rearranging existing social welfare, the rest by a dedicated new tax. The proposal received no significant political support.

=== Iceland ===
In October 2014 the Icelandic Pirate Party put forth a parliamentary resolution calling on the Minister of Social Affairs and Housing and the Minister of Finance and Economic Affairs to appoint a workgroup to conceive ways to ensure every citizen an unconditional basic income. The Pirate Party currently holds 6 out of 63 seats in the Icelandic Parliament.

=== Ireland ===
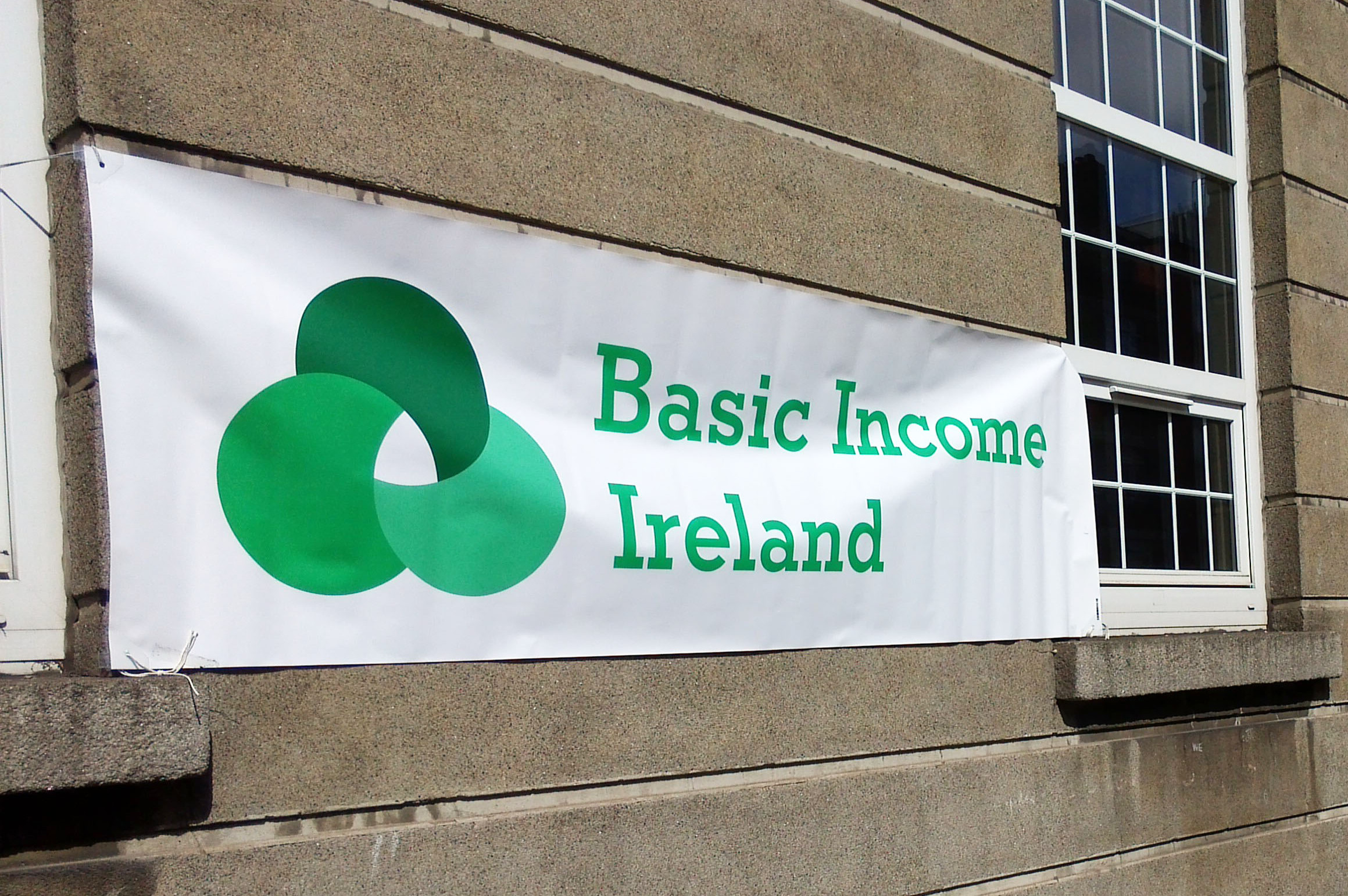
A Basic Income Ireland banner, pictured in 2015

The chief advocacy group is Basic Income Ireland, a member of BIEN. Social Justice Ireland has produced a fully costed proposal for 2012. Before that, the main advocate was CORI (Conference of Religious of Ireland), one of the social partners.

As part of the agreement with the social partners including CORI, a green paper on Basic Income was published by the Irish government in 2002, but there has been no movement on a government level since then.

In 2013, during the European Citizen's Initiative campaign, six MEPs from the Republic of Ireland signed a statement in favour of Basic Income.

=== Netherlands ===
The issue of basic income gained prominence on the political agenda in Netherlands between the mid-1970s and mid-1990s. In 2015 it was announced that the city of Utrecht and its local university will be conducting an experiment on basic income. Local authorities are planning to encourage other municipalities to engage in similar experiences.

=== Norway ===
The Green Party and The Pirate Party endorse basic income in Norway. The Red Party, The Democrats and The Liberal Party formerly endorsed a basic income guarantee in Norway. The Liberal Party dropped it from the platform before the 2013 election. But as of the 2021 election again supported the idea as a means to decrease bureaucracy.

The NGO BIEN Norge, affiliated with Basic Income Earth Network works to promote the system in Norway.

=== Portugal ===
Logo of the Unconditional Basic Income Europe (UBIE) group in Portugal

The Portuguese political parties LIVRE, People Animals Nature (PAN) and Volt Portugal support a universal basic income.

=== Spain ===
Since 2001, the Red Renta Básica is the national network affiliated to the BIEN. It gathers researchers and activists for basic income. From 2011 to 2012, the 15-M Movement also contributed a lot in spreading the idea among the Spanish society, and political parties as Partido Andalucista in Andalusia and Podemos introduced it as one of its proposals.

In 2015, a citizen's initiative received 185,000 signatures, short of the required amount for the proposal to be discussed in parliament.

Famous Spanish advocates of basic income include Daniel Raventos, David Casassas, and José Luis Ley.

According to Economy Minister Nadia Calviño, Social Security Minister José Luis Escrivá is coordinating a universal basic income project to help counter the economic impact of the COVID-19 pandemic, although the scheme is expected to be rolled out indefinitely. The scheme was approved by cabinet on 29 May 2020.

=== Sweden ===
Swedbank, a Swedish bank, included a piece about basic income in the Baltic region in its Macro Research Report in December 2017. In the first part of the article the bank wrote:

"The recent growing interest in UBI has been fuelled by rising fears of job losses due to automation and globalisation, as well as the growing inequality of income and opportunity across some advanced economies. The increasing discontent among citizens who have lost out to automation and globalisation and the rise of the precariat, the so-called new deprived social class facing insecurity and underemployment,15 pose a considerable threat to political stability and democratic values, as indicated by the recent election outcomes in the US, the UK, and some other EU countries. The proponents of UBI argue that greater income security via this measure could be a possible solution to these problems and could help tame voter discontent and prevent them from supporting populists."

After having discussed the potential pros and cons with basic income, and after having dismissed the idea of a full basic income, because of the cost. The bank, still, thinks that reforms in the direction of basic income could be on the table. They suggest that a partial basic income could be a good start, or perhaps a once-in-a-lifetime payout for all young adults.

"However, some parts of the basic income model could be used in simplifying and improving the efficiency of the existing social security systems. Governments could make the existing benefits more accessible by eliminating unnecessary conditions and means testing in order to reach those who fall outside the system. This could also help cut administrative costs. A more gradual phasing out of benefits would reduce the unemployment trap and increase the incentives for the unemployed to enter the labour market. In order to make the transition to basic income more gradual and limit the cost increases, governments, instead of implementing full-scale UBI, could consider a "partial" basic income that would apply only to new cohorts. Lithuania has taken a step in this direction by replacing the additional non-taxable income with lump-sum cash benefits paid to all children, without regard to family income. Maybe, as a start, a similar basic income or, simply, a once-in-a-lifetime payout could be introduced to young adults, which would at least partly level the playing field for poorer youngsters. However, payments to young cohorts only may be met with resistance from the older ones. Yet another alternative to UBI is a negative income tax..."

=== Switzerland ===
The association BIEN-Switzerland (affiliated to the Basic Income Earth Network) promotes basic income in the francophone part of Switzerland. In the German-speaking part of Switzerland a group called "Initiative Grundeinkommen" is very active in promoting basic income.

==== The 2016 basic income referendum ====
In 2008, Daniel Häni and Enno Schmidt produced The Basic income, a cultural impulse, a movie that explains and praises the idea of a basic income. With more than 400,000 views, the movie went viral and contributed a lot in spreading the idea among French and German speaking countries. In April 2012 a popular legislative initiative was launched which aimed at introducing basic income in the Swiss Federal Constitution. The campaign successfully collected enough signatures (126,000) by 4 October, thereby triggering a nationwide popular referendum in June 2016, making Switzerland the first country where people were consulted by referendum on this issue.

The proposal would have given 2,500 francs monthly to every adult and 625 francs to every child. The government estimated the costs to be 208 billion francs per year, most of which could have been covered by abolishing the existing social security system, but the last 25 billion francs would have been only possible to collect by tax raises. The trade union Syna brought its support for this initiative, but none of the political parties supported the proposal, and both the federal government and the National Council of Switzerland (lower house of parliament) called on the people to reject the proposal by referendum.

The main arguments against basic income before the referendum, as interpreted by Martin Farley:

- It was a risky experiment
- It was a utopian fairy tale with no basis in reality
- It would result in inflation if adopted
- The Swiss are not poor, so a basic income is not really required
- Switzerland already has a very good and effective system of social welfare, so it does not need to be replaced
- People should earn their income, not just receive it
- The proposal was prohibitively expensive and would require a huge increase in tax
- There was no plan in place to fund it

In the end, the proposal was defeated, with almost 77% voting against it. 23% voted for it.

=== Ukraine ===
Though the idea of basic income is not promoted by the government, different tech companies develop and adopt the ideas of unconditional basic income. The most well known example is the Nimses concept. Nimses has a time-based currency called nim (equals to 1 minute). Every person that joins the system receives 1440 nims per day that can be spent on different goods and services.

=== United Kingdom ===
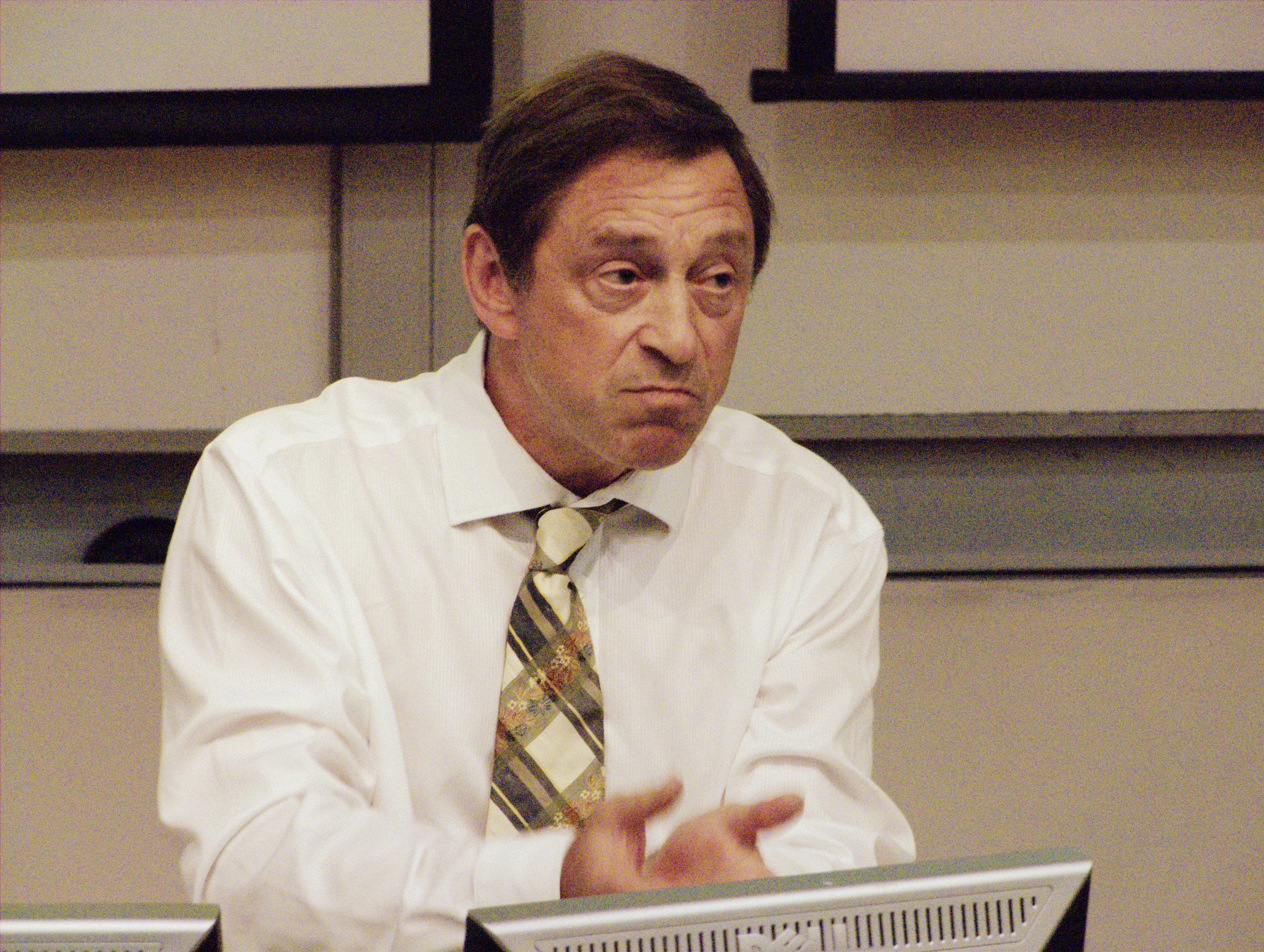
Guy Standing, a British basic income advocate

Basic Income has been discussed and advocated for in the United Kingdom for much of the 20th and 21st century. It started with the writings by Bertrand Russell, Major C. H. Douglas, and Dennis Milner around 1920 (with little if any interaction between them). In 1946 the UK implemented Family Allowances, an unconditional income for the second and subsequent children of every family, and during the mid-1970s this became Child Benefit; an unconditional income for every child. In 1982, Brandon Rhys Williams MP proposed a Basic Income to a parliamentary committee, in 1984 the Basic Income Research Group (now the Citizen's Basic Income Trust) started work, and from 2014 onwards the debate started to take off, among think tanks and academics, in the print and other media, and among some Members of Parliament. Some parties are pro-basic income, most notably the Scottish National Party, which at its spring 2016 conference backed the principle of a universal basic income to replace the current welfare system. Other parties supporting it are the Green Party of England and Wales, the Scottish Green Party, and the Scottish Socialist Party. On 16 February 2016, then Shadow Chancellor John McDonnell said that a basic income policy was under consideration by the Labour Party. In August 2018, he said that Labour hoped to include a proposal for a pilot scheme in its next manifesto.

Guy Standing is perhaps the most well known contemporary advocate of the idea. In his book The Precariat - the new dangerous class, he blames globalization for having plunged more and more people into the precariat, which he analyses as a new emerging social class. He concludes on the necessity for "governments to provide basic security as a right" through a basic income. Other advocates include Edward Skidelsky and Robert Skidelsky, who argued for basic income in their book called How Much is Enough?, Malcolm Torry who is Director of the UK Citizen's Income Trust, Louise Haagh, chair of the Basic Income Earth Network, and Annie Miller who co-founded Citizens Basic Income Network Scotland.

In 2023 three universal basic income pilot schemes of £1,600 a month each were launched, one in Wales for those leaving care, and in England two micro-projects in Jarrow, in North East England, and East Finchley.

== North America ==
=== Canada ===
William Aberhart, premier of Alberta, was inspired by Major C. H. Douglas Social Credit theory and tried to implement a basic income for Albertans during the 1930s. However, he was thwarted in his attempts by the Federal Government of the time.

The city of Dauphin, Manitoba, Canada, took part in an experimental guaranteed income program ("Mincome") between 1974 and 1979.

In November 2013, a poll commissioned by the Trudeau Foundation found that 46% of Canadians favored and 42% opposed replacing current economic assistance with a guaranteed national income.

Starting in 2014, the Liberal Party of Canada, the Green Party of Canada, the Pirate Party of Canada, provincial party Québec Solidaire, and conservative senator Hugh Segal have been advocating for basic income in Canada. Mike Redmond, leader of the New Democratic Party of Prince Edward Island, has supported a basic income pilot project on Prince Edward Island.

In 2017 the Liberal Government of Ontario announced that in 2017 they would launch the Ontario Basic Income Pilot Project in the cities of Hamilton, Lindsay and Thunder Bay. Selected residents received CAD$17,000. The newly elected Progressive Conservative government announced in August 2018 that the pilot would be halted, and payments concluded by 31 March 2019.

The British Columbia Basic Income Expert Panel Report, released on 28 January 2021, is based on over 40 commissioned studies and "is likely one of the most exhaustive examinations on the viability of a guaranteed income conducted anywhere in the world." The panel concluded that for B.C., a system constructed around "a basic income for all" as its main pillar "is not the most just policy option. The needs of people in this society are too diverse to be effectively answered simply with a cheque from the government." A UBI was found to be "orders of magnitude" more expensive than income-tested support programs that provide similar poverty reduction. The panel also determined that a basic income pilot would not be useful, chiefly because pilots are, by their nature, temporary and cannot provide evidence on long-term impacts.

=== United States ===
Arguably, basic income was invented in the United States by Thomas Paine, who outlined something similar using arguments very similar to those of modern basic income advocates, but it was the English writer, Thomas Spence, who—writing in response to Paine—first outlined a complete basic income proposal in 1797.

The United States has experienced three distinct waves of support for basic income in the twentieth and twenty-first centuries. In the first half of the century various people advocated it in different forms including Louisiana governor Huey Long who called it "Share Our Wealth" and some followers of Henry George.

The second wave of support for basic income in the United States rose during the 1960s and fell almost as quickly in the late 1970s. At the time, there was a big debate in the United States regarding poverty and how to deal with it. One of the solutions that came up during this time was some form of guaranteed income, mostly in the form of a negative income tax but sometimes in the form of basic income.

In 1968, James Tobin, Paul Samuelson, John Kenneth Galbraith and another 1,200 economists signed a document calling for the US Congress to introduce in that year a system of income guarantees and supplements. Milton Friedman endorsed the negative income tax in 1962 and again in 1980, and he connected his support for the negative income tax to support for basic income in an interview with Eduardo Suplicy in 2000. Martin Luther King, Jr., a famous civil rights activist and Christian pastor, also gave his support for the idea in his book Where Do We Go From Here: Chaos or Community?, published in 1967. In 1969, Richard Nixon proposed a "Family Assistance Program" which resembled guaranteed income, in that benefits did not rapidly taper with additional earnings by the beneficiaries. Nixon's proposal only applied to families, but extended previous welfare by benefiting more than those without a 'father'.

Other advocates from the 1960s and 1970s include Senator George McGovern who called for a 'demogrant' that was similar to a basic income. The most often noted outcome of the second wave of basic income support in the United States has been the four basic income experiments (see below) conducted by the U.S. government at the time but arguably expansions of Food Stamps and the Earned Income Tax Credit and creation of the Alaska Dividend (see below) were all outcomes of the debate.

Discussion of basic income or any form of income guarantee drop off considerably in the United States after 1980, but the academic debate grew gradually through the 1990s and 2000s. The U.S. Basic Income Guarantee Network (the USBIG Network) was founded when six academics including Fred Block, Erik Olin Wright, and others met at the Kiev Diner in New York City in December 1999. The group held its first Congress in 2002 and has held one each year since. The yearly events have been renamed the North America Basic Income Guarantee Congress and now take place in Canada on even years and in the United States on odd years.

Partly as an outgrowth of the USBIG Networks conference, a bill for a modest basic income was introduced into the U.S. House of Representatives under the name "Tax Cut for the Rest of Us Act", based on a proposal coauthored by Al Sheahen.

After the 2008 financial crisis and the Occupy movement and We are the 99%, the increased political attention to the issue of inequality brought new interest to basic income, which was furthered by influence from basic income trials conducted in Namibia and Indian and petition drives (citizens initiatives) for basic income in Switzerland and the European Union.

Discussion has picked up every year to the point where mainstream political actors are regularly talking about basic income for the first time since the 1970s.

A small amount of third-wave basic income support has come from the right of center, it appeals to people who think of it as a way to streamline and simplify the welfare system while making it more cost effective, and perhaps saving money. Mike Gravel talked about a tax rebate paid in a monthly check from the government to all citizens as part of a transition away from income taxes and toward a pre-bated national sales tax (the FairTax), which was also endorsed by Mike Huckabee. Libertarian advocates include Charles Murray, Jerry Taylor of the Niskanen Center, Matt Zwolinski, and a group called "Bleeding Heart Libertarians". But although conservative and libertarian support was a central part of support for the negative income tax in the 1970s, it remains a small part today.

But far more of the contemporary support for basic income in the United States has come from the left of center, driving by people who see it as a major expansion of support for low-income people, as the late, Al Sheahan argued in his 2012 book, the Basic Income Guarantee: Your right to economic security. Former Labor Secretary Robert Reich has argued forceful for basic income. The Green Party of the United States in its 2010 platform advocated for a universal basic income to "every adult regardless of health, employment, or marital status, in order to minimize government bureaucracy and intrusiveness into people's lives." The Occupy Movement and Black Lives Matter have both endorsed basic income. Many climate change activists, such as Peter Barnes, propose a Citizen's dividend as part of their strategy to put a price on the depletion of resources.

Many technology experts and technology entrepreneurs have begun endorsing basic income in the 2000s and 2010s. These include Marshal Brain, Sam Altman, James Hughes, Facebook co-founder Chris Hughes, Elon Musk, and Mark Zuckerberg (in his 2017 Harvard commencement speech), and Jeremy Rifkin. The overriding theme among technologists who favor basic income is the belief that automation is creating an increasingly unstable labor market. Rifkin in his book The End of Work, argued not only that the labor market is less stable but also that automation would reduce the total demand for workers in future.

Labor leader, Andy Stern, endorsed basic income for many of the same reasons as the technology entrepreneurs.

The Economic Security Project (backed in part by Chis Hughes) has begun funding basic income projects around the United States.

2020 Democratic presidential candidate Andrew Yang has a version of Universal Basic Income, rebranded as the "Freedom Dividend", as the central plank of his platform.

==== Basic income pilots and small-scale basic income projects ====
During the 1960s and 1970s, the United States conducted four Negative Income Tax experiments; they took place in New Jersey and Pennsylvania (1968–1972), rural areas of North Carolina and Iowa (1970–1972), Seattle and Denver (1970–1978), and Gary, Indiana (1971–1974). Several Native America nations distribute dividends to their members. For example, members of the Eastern Band of Cherokee Indians, based in North Carolina, receive payments of several thousand dollars twice a year. These payments are dividends from the profits of the Harrah's Cherokee casino, and have been distributed since 1996. A study of the payments' effects on the children of the community found significant declines in poverty, behavioral problems, crime, substance abuse and psychiatric problems, and increases in on-time graduation. The effects were primarily found among those who were youngest when the payments began, and among those who were lifted out of poverty rather than those who were already well-off.

As of 2018, the entrepreneurial fund, Y Combinator (run largely by Sam Altman) was planning to run a basic income study in Oakland. In 2019, Stockton, California became the first city in the U.S. to experiment with UBI, giving $500 debit cards every month to 125 residents who earn less than $46,000 annually. Stockton's mayor announced the UBI project would be extended until January 2021.

==== Hawaii ====
In July 2017, Hawaii State Rep. Chris Lee published a bill to investigate basic income for his state.

==== Permanent fund of Alaska ====
The Alaska Permanent Fund pays a partial basic income to all its residents since 1982. According to the Basic Income Earth Network, the introduction and development of the only genuine universal basic income system in existence to this day took place just in Alaska in the mid-1970s, just as discussion of basic income was dying down in the rest of the United States. Jay Hammond, the Republican governor was concerned that the huge wealth generated by oil mining in Prudhoe Bay, the largest oilfield in North America, would only benefit the current population of the state. He suggested setting up a fund to ensure that this wealth would be preserved, through investment of part of the revenue from oil. In 1976, the Alaska Permanent Fund was created by an amendment to the State Constitution. After years of political negotiations about what to do with the returns to the fund, Jay Hammond used the power of his office to craft an agreement to create a genuine universal basic income—the Permanent Fund Dividend. Since implementation of the program in 1982, everyone who meets a special residency requirement – currently around 650,000 people – has received a dividend every year. The amount varies each year, but is the same for all residents regardless of age, citizenship, employment status, number of years of residence in the state, and so on. This dividend corresponds to part of the average interest earned, over the previous five years, on the permanent fund set up using the revenue from oil mining. The dividend stood at around $300 per person per annum in the early years but was close to reaching $2000 in 2000, when the stock market plummeted and cut the dividend in half in the course of a few years. In 2008, however, the size of the annual dividends reached a new all-time high with payments of $2069 per person.

== Oceania ==
=== Australia ===
Basic income has gained support from Australian academics such as John Tomlinson, John Wiseman, and Allan MacDonald. The Queensland Greens were the first Australian party to adopt a Guaranteed Adequate Income (GAI) policy in 1999. Basic Income Guarantee Australia was accepted into the Basic Income Earth Network in 2006 as an affiliate member. In August 2014, ACOSS made a recommendation to simplify the welfare system via a basic income support payment; however, this differs from a universal guaranteed income in that it would still be means-tested. In 2020, the Greens NSW adopted the Universal Wellbeing Payment as a policy.

A universal basic income of $500 per week to every Australian citizen aged over 18-years-old is supported by the Fusion Party. The party would also allow for top-up payments for those such as pensioners, the disabled, carers etc.

=== New Zealand ===
In March 2016, the then leader of the New Zealand Labour Party, Andrew Little, announced a debate at their forthcoming Future of Work conference on the introduction of a universal basic income to replace other forms of welfare. He said:

"We are keen to have that debate about whether the time has arrived for us to have a system that is seamless, easy to pass through, [with a] guaranteed basic income and [where] you can move in and out of work on a regular basis," or "an income support system that means every time you stop work you have to go through the palaver of stand-down periods, more bureaucracy, more form filling at the same time as you're trying to get into your next job."

The Opportunity Party supports a universal basic income.

== South America ==
=== Brazil ===
Basic income has been discussed in modern Brazil at least since the 1980s. In 2001 a law was introduced by Senator Eduardo Suplicy of the Brazilian Workers Party which mandated the progressive institution of such a welfare system. By this move Brazil became the first country in the world to pass such a law. Suplicy had previously introduced a bill to create a Negative Income Tax, but that bill failed to pass. The new bill called for a national and universal basic income to be instituted, beginning with those most in need. The bill was approved by the Senate in 2002 and by the Chamber of Deputies in 2003. President Lula da Silva signed it into law in 2004, and according to the bill it is the president's responsibility to gradually implement the reform. Since then Brazil has started to implement the bill through the Bolsa Família-program, which was a centerpiece of President Luiz Inácio Lula da Silva's social policy, and is reputed to have played a role in his victory in the 2006 Brazilian presidential election.

An independent and privately funded pilot project is currently in place in Brazil in Quatinga Velho. The project started 2008 and is organized by the non-profit organization ReCivitas. It provides R$30 monthly which is 4.4% of the minimum salary in 2013 (as defined by the federal government) and is not enough to meet basic needs. "The real value of R$30,00 Basic Income at Quatinga Velho, just is sufficient to help people satisfy the most basic material needs. Children especially enjoy this Quatinga Velho benefit. The project ReCivitas succeeded with the use of extremely limited financial resource, to achieve significant social effects. Should be emphasized the positive impacts to the satisfaction of basic needs and quality of life of the project participants. The results indicate that the BI has contributed to sustainable development in Quatinga Velho. The effects were convincing, particularly in the area of assurance of basic needs, improving the quality of life and social skills." "[...]This amount of money sounds very small to people from industrialized countries, but it has a large impact in a rural area of Brazil. The coordinators have verified gains in nutrition, clothing, living conditions, health (especially in children), construction of new housing, and improvements to existing ones. In informal interviews, the coordinators have noticed increased self-esteem and social interaction, reduction of social insecurity, and rising expectations of the future, especially regarding children. They noted that they have not observed increased use of alcohol or illicit drugs; significant changes in labor relations, birth, migration or emigration, or generation of political relations and economic dependency. Although the project leaders are examining the effects of the local basic income, the coordinators of the project told USBIG that the point of the project is not to study BIG. They are already convinced that model has been proven effective; they want to put it into practice. The goal is to put the policy in place. If governments are not ready to do it on a national scale with tax funding, Recivitas is attempting to do it on a small scale with private funding."

== See also ==
- List of advocates of universal basic income
