= Julen =

Julen (Basque pronunciation: [julen], Spanish pronunciation: [ɟulen]) is a Basque and Spanish masculine given name. Notable people with the name include:

== Given name ==
- Julen Agirrezabala (born 2000), Spanish footballer
- Julen Aguinagalde (born 1982), Spanish handballer
- Julen Amezqueta (born 1993), Spanish footballer
- Julen Arellano (born 1997), Spanish footballer
- Julen Azkue (born 1995), Spanish footballer
- Julen Bollain (born 1990), Spanish economist, professor and researcher
- Julen Castañeda (born 1990), Spanish footballer
- Julen Colinas (born 1988), Spanish footballer
- Julen Cordero (born 2001), Costa Rican footballer
- Julen Etxabeguren (born 1991), Spanish footballer
- Julen Goikoetxea (1985–2006), Basque cyclist from Ondarroa
- Julen Guerrero (born 1974), retired Spanish footballer
- Julen Guerrero Calvo (born 1996), Spanish actor and director
- Julen Jon Guerrero (born 2004), Spanish footballer
- Julen Guimón (1931–2001), Spanish jurist and politician
- Julen Irizar (born 1995), Spanish cyclist
- Julen Jiménez (born 1994), Spanish actor and dancer
- Julen Lobete (born 2000), Spanish footballer
- Julen Lopetegui (born 1966), retired Spanish footballer and current manager
- Julen Luis Arizmendi Martínez (born 1976), Spanish chess grandmaster
- Julen Madariaga (1932–2021), Basque Spanish politician and lawyer, co-founder of ETA
- Julen Martínez (born 2005), Spanish footballer
- Julen Rementería del Puerto (born 1961), Mexican politician
- Julen Isaakovych Uralov (1924–2026), Soviet Olympic fencer
- Julen Urigüen (born 1991), junior tennis player in the United States
- Julen Roselló, a child who fell down a hole in 2019

== Surname ==
- Alfons Julen (1899–1988), Swiss cross-country skier
- Anton Julen (1898–1982), Swiss cross-country skier
- Martin Julen (born 1928), Swiss alpine skier
- Max Julen (born 1961), Swiss alpine skier
- Oswald Julen (1912–1998), Swiss skier
- Roy Julen (born 1976), Dutch tap dancer and actor
- Simon Julen (1897–1951), Swiss cross-country skier

== See also ==
- Lat julen foerkunna, song written by John Lennon and Yoko Ono
- Julana
- Julian (disambiguation)
- Julienne (disambiguation)
- Jullian
- Jullien
- Zuilen
