= List of advocates of universal basic income =

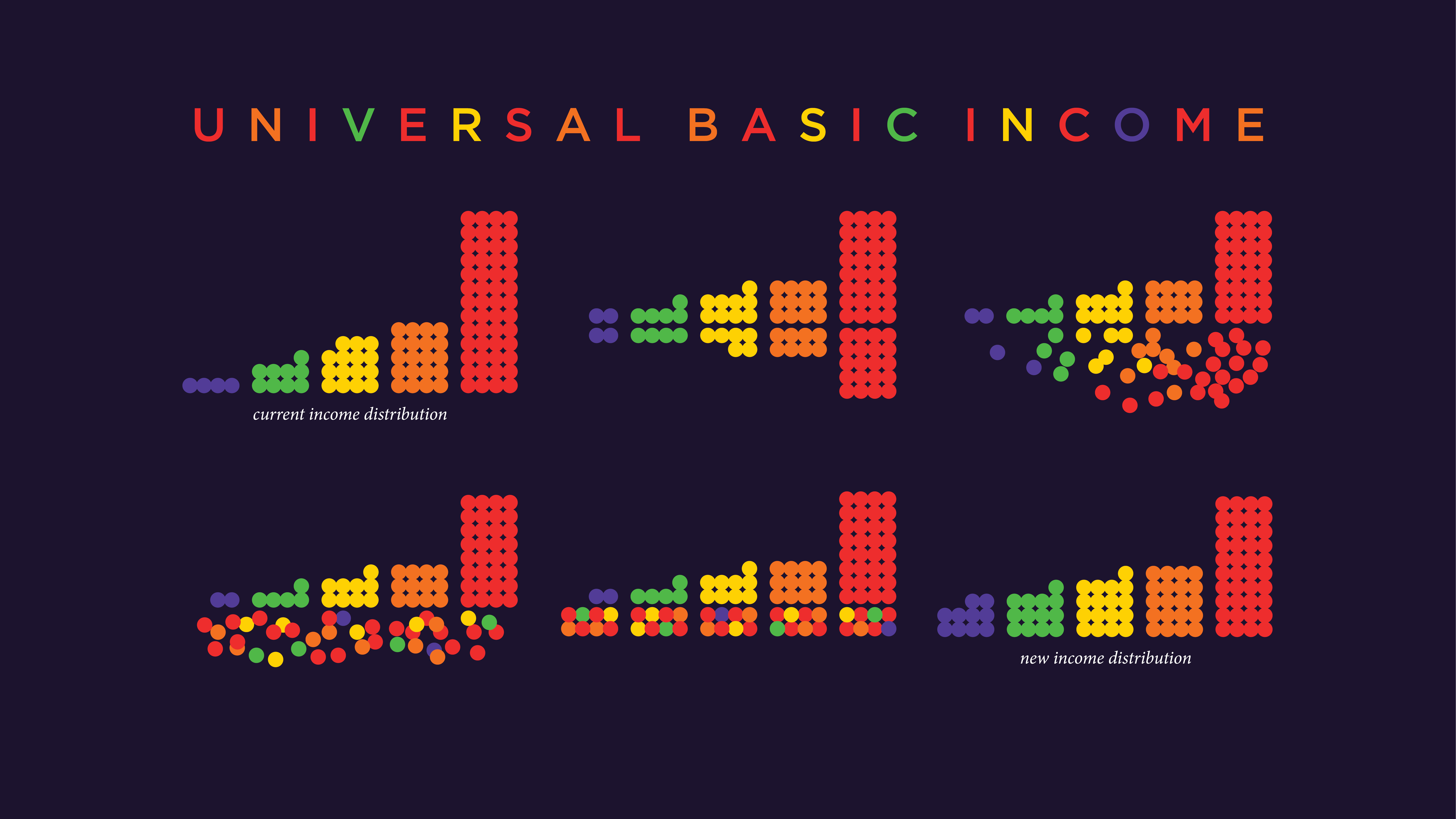

The following is a list of notable individuals who have publicly expressed support or are working for the introduction of a universal basic income (UBI).

== Europe ==
- Özgür Özel, Chairman of Republican People's Party
- Dieter Althaus, German politician
- Tim Berners-Lee, World Wide Web inventor
- Julen Bollain, Spanish economist, politician and basic income researcher
- Robert Habeck, German politician
- Winfried Kretschmann, German politician
- Frank Thelen, German entrepreneur and author
- Richard David Precht, German philosopher and author
- Harald Welzer, German social psychologist
- Maja Göpel, German political economist and sustainability scientist
- Gerald Hüther, German neurobiologist and author
- Ranga Yogeshwar, Luxembourgish author and science journalist
- Alan Watts, British writer
- Louise Haagh, political theorist, form chair of the Basic Income Earth Network
- Rutger Bregman, Dutch author
- Angus Deaton, 2015 Nobel Prize Laureate in Economics
- André Gorz, Austrian-French social philosopher and journalist
- Beppe Grillo, Italian comedian, actor, blogger, and politician
- Benoit Hamon, candidate for President of France in 2017
- Timotheus Höttges, German manager
- Katja Kipping, The Left, Germany
- Caroline Lucas, British politician
- John McDonnell, British politician
- Antonio Negri, Italian Spinozistic-Marxist sociologist and political philosopher
- Philippe Van Parijs, Belgian philosopher
- Carole Pateman, feminist and political theorist
- Thomas Piketty, economist
- Christopher A. Pissarides, 2010 Nobel Prize Laureate in Economics
- Jonathan Reynolds, British politician
- Jeremy Corbyn, British politician
- Molly Scott Cato, British politician, academic, environmental and community activist, and green economist
- Osmo Soininvaara, Finnish politician
- Guy Standing, British economist
- Aubrey de Grey, English author and biogerontologist
- Yanis Varoufakis, former finance minister of Greece
- Björn Wahlroos, Finnish billionaire
- Susanne Wiest, German activist
- Harald Lesch, German astrophysicist and author
- Thomas Straubhaar, Swiss economist
- Martin Wehrle, German journalist and author
- Michael Bohmeyer, German entrepreneur, author and activist
- Wolfgang Strengmann-Kuhn, German politician
- Joe Kaeser, German manager
- Giuseppe Conte, Italian jurist, politician and leader of the Five Star Movement
- Claus Offe, German sociologist
- David Casassas, Spanish sociologist
- Marcel Fratzscher, German economist
- Clive Lewis, British politician
- Oswald Sigg, Swiss journalist
- Georges-Louis Bouchez, Belgian politician and lawyer
- Richard Branson, British business magnate
- Geoffrey Hinton, British computer scientist
- Marius Ostrowski, British-German political theorist
- Christoph Werner, German entrepreneur
- Karsten Wildberger, German politician
- Zack Polanski, British politician
- Richard Murphy, British tax campaigner
- Baroness Natalie Bennett, British politician

== United States and Canada ==
=== U.S. political officials and candidates ===
- James Baker (R), 61st U.S. Secretary of State & 67th U.S. Treasury Secretary
- Aja Brown (D), 18th Mayor of Compton
- Keith Ellison (D), 30th Attorney General of Minnesota, former U.S. Congressman, and former DNC Deputy Chair
- Martin Feldstein (R), former Chair of the U.S. Council of Economic Advisers
- Tulsi Gabbard (R), 8th Director of National Intelligence and 2020 Democratic presidential candidate
- Greg Mankiw (I), former Chair of the U.S. Council of Economic Advisers
- Eugene McCarthy (D), U.S. Senator & candidate in the 1968 U.S. Presidential election
- Elon Musk (I), Senior Advisor to the President
- Henry Paulson (R), 74th U.S. Treasury Secretary
- Robert Reich (D), former U.S. Secretary of Labor
- George P. Shultz (R), 60th U.S. Secretary of State & 62nd U.S. Treasury Secretary
- Curtis Sliwa (R), Republican nominee for the 2021 and 2025 New York City mayoral election
- Michael Tubbs (D), 79th Mayor of Stockton, CA
- Andrew Yang (FWD), Chair of the Forward Party and 2020 Democratic presidential candidate

=== Other notable individuals ===
- Peter Barnes, entrepreneur and environmentalist
- Peter Diamond, 2010 Economics Nobel Prize winner
- Jack Dorsey, founder of Twitter
- Ted Halstead, policy entrepreneur
- Pierre Omidyar, founder of eBay
- Erik Olin Wright, Marxist sociologist
- Andrew Ng, computer scientist, statistician, and artificial intelligence researcher
- Tim Draper, venture capitalist
- Sam Altman, CEO of OpenAI
- Chris Hughes, co-founder of Meta Platforms
- Dan Savage, LGBT activist
- Charles Murray, libertarian political scientist
- Bill Gross, financial manager
- Robin Chase, co-founder of Zipcar
- Andy Stern, former Service Employees International Union president
- Michael Hudson, economist at University of Missouri–Kansas City
- Ryan Holmes, Hootsuite CEO
- Joe Rogan, American podcast host
- Paul Vallée, Pythian Group CEO
- Naheed Nenshi, Mayor of Calgary
- Don Iveson, Mayor of Edmonton
- S. Robson Walton, former Walmart Chairman
- Mark Zuckerberg, founder of Meta Platforms
- Jeff Bezos, founder of Amazon
- Bill Gates, founder of Microsoft (Note: However, note that Bill Gates said that it is too early to implement a universal basic income in 2017. He said that "even the US isn't rich enough [yet] to allow people not to work", but "over time countries will be [...]". Overall, there is "[...] still [...] a lot of work that should be done [...]". Source: Weller, Chris (27 February 2017). "Bill Gates says it's too early for basic income, but over time 'countries will be rich enough'". www.businessinsider.com. Archived from the original on 20 March 2021.)
- Tim Cook, CEO of Apple
- Larry Page, co-founder of Google
- Ray Kurzweil, American inventor and futurist
- Neil deGrasse Tyson, American astrophysicist
- Penn Jillette, American magician, actor, television presenter, and author
- Jeremy Rifkin, American economic and social theorist
- Erik Brynjolfsson, American author and inventor
- Andrew McAfee, American research scientist
- Timothy Leary, psychologist
- Peter Diamandis, Greek-American entrepreneur
- Guy Caron, Canadian politician
- Peter Vallentyne, American academic
- Hillel Steiner, Canadian political philosopher
- Ben Goertzel, American AI researcher
- Karina Gould, Liberal Party of Canada member of Parliament.
- Edward Snowden, American whistleblower
- Peter Thiel, German-American entrepreneur
- Asmongold, American political commentator

== Asia, Africa, Latin America, and Oceania ==
- Richard Di Natale, Australian senator from 2011 to 2020 and the leader of the Australian Greens from 2015 to 2020
- Eduardo Suplicy, Brazilian politician and economist
- Kim Kataguiri, Brazilian activist and politician
- Varun Gandhi, former Indian Member of Parliament
- Arvind Subramanian, former economic adviser in India
- Archbishop Desmond Tutu, 1984 Nobel Peace Prize Laureate, South Africa
- Gareth Morgan, economist, New Zealand
- Andrew Little, minister of Justice, New Zealand
- Johann Rupert, South-African billionaire businessman
- Lee Jae-myung, South Korean politician and leader of the Democratic Party of Korea
- Yong Hye-in, South Korean politician of the Basic Income Party

== Historical advocates ==
=== Eighteenth and nineteenth centuries ===
- Thomas Spence, an eighteenth century English radical, was apparently the first to lay out in full what is now called a universal basic income.
- Thomas Paine, a philosopher and one of the Founding Fathers of the United States, advocated a capital grant and an unconditional citizens pension in his 1797 pamphlet Agrarian Justice.
- American economist Henry George advocated a citizen's dividend paid for by a land value tax in an April 1885 speech at a Knights of Labor local in Burlington, Iowa titled "The Crime of Poverty" and later in an interview with former U.S. House Representative David Dudley Field II from New York's 7th congressional district published in the July 1885 edition of the North American Review.
- William Morris, British socialist activist

=== Twentieth century ===
- Buckminster Fuller, architect
- Bertrand Russell, philosopher
- Huey Long, governor and US Senator from Louisiana, in his Share Our Wealth plan
- Jan Pieter Kuiper, Dutch professor of social medicine
- American economists James Tobin, Paul Samuelson, and John Kenneth Galbraith signed a document with 1,200 other economists in 1968 calling for the 90th U.S. Congress to introduce in that year a system of income guarantees and supplements.
- American economist Milton Friedman advocated a basic income in the form of a negative income tax in his 1962 book Capitalism and Freedom, and again in his 1980 book Free to Choose.
- Austrian economist Friedrich Hayek advocated a guaranteed minimum income in his 1944 book The Road to Serfdom, and reiterated his support in his 1973 book Law, Legislation and Liberty.
- Tony Atkinson - British economist, Centennial Professor at the London School of Economics, and senior research fellow of Nuffield College, Oxford.
- British economist James Meade
- C. H. Douglas - British engineer and pioneer of the social credit economic reform movement.
- Civil rights leader Martin Luther King, Jr. endorsed it under the name of "the guaranteed income" in his 1967 book Where Do We Go from Here: Chaos or Community? shortly before his assassination.
- French politician Lionel Stoléru argued for UBI in 1974, remarking that it would provide “a means of suppressing and simplifying the entire current series of social programmes”.
- U.S. Senator George McGovern from South Dakota sponsored a bill proposed by the National Welfare Rights Organization to enact a $6,500 guaranteed minimum income, and in his 1972 presidential campaign, proposed replacing the personal income tax exemption with a $1,000 tax credit as a minimum-income floor for every citizen.
- Virginia Woolf, English writer

=== Twenty-first century ===
- Stephen Hawking, English theoretical physicist, cosmologist, and author
- Ailsa McKay, Scottish economist
- Götz Werner, founder, co-owner, and member of the advisory board of dm-drogerie markt
- Pope Francis, pope of the Catholic Church
- Bank of Humanity private sector led "Universal Basic Income (UBI)" platform for Resource Based Economies (RBEs)
