= Claus Offe =

German political sociologist (1940–2025)

- Offe in 2019
- Born: 16 March 1940; Berlin, Germany
- Died: 1 October 2025 (aged 85); Berlin, Germany
- Spouse: Ulrike Poppe

Academic background
- Education: Free University of Berlin (MA); Goethe University Frankfurt (PhD); University of Konstanz (Hab.)
- Doctoral advisor: Fritz Neumark
- Other advisor: Jürgen Habermas

Claus Offe (16 March 1940 – 1 October 2025) was a German political sociologist associated with the Frankfurt School who taught at universities in Germany and the United States, with a focus on political economic analysis. He found new perspectives for a wide range of topics such as analysis of social crises, the welfare state, the transformation of Eastern Europe and European integration, unconditional basic income, civil society and the common good. Offe was a founding member of the Greens and of the Hertie School.

== Life and career ==
Offe was born in Berlin on 16 March 1940, the eldest of the four children of the chemist Hans Albert Offe and his wife Ursula née Brenneke. After World War II, the family moved several times, often within North Rhine-Westphalia. He achieved his Abitur from the humanist Wilhelm Dörpfeld Gymnasium in Wuppertal-Elberfeld in 1959. He first studied musicology and sociology at the University of Cologne from 1959 to 1960. He then moved to the Humboldt-University of Berlin to study sociology, economics and philosophy, completing with a diploma in sociology in 1965. During his studies, he was a member of the Sozialistischer Deutscher Studentenbund (SDS); he was a co-author of its 1965 publication Hochschule in der Demokratie (Academy in Democracy).

Offe worked as an assistant to Jürgen Habermas at the University of Frankfurt, teaching sociology of organisations and political sociology until 1969. He focused on theory of politics and political economic analysis. He achieved his PhD in 1968, with a dissertation entitled Leistungsprinzip und industrielle Arbeit (Performance Principle and Industrial Work), supervised by the economist Fritz Neumark.

He worked as fellow and visiting professor at the Institutes for Advanced Study in Stanford, Princeton and the Australian National University. He studied between 1969 and 1971 at the University of California at Berkeley on a Harkness fellowship, at Harvard University as a research associate at the Center for West European Studies, and at The New School in Greenwich, New York. In a 1972 book, Strukturprobleme des kapitalistischen Staates, he analysed the structural problems caused by the internal contradictions of the capitalist state, keeping an intellectual independence from Marxist dogmas. He collaborated with Habermas and Carl Friedrich von Weizsäcker at the Max Planck Institute for the Study of the Scientific-Technical World in Starnberg. He completed his habilitation in political sociology at the University of Konstanz in 1973.

In Germany, he held chairs for political science and political sociology at the Bielefeld University from 1975 to 1989, working with Niklas Luhmann, with whom he shared the view that the state was not a mirror of the economy, but had its own interests, describing statehood in the tradition of Max Weber. Offe taught at the University of Bremen from 1989 to 1995, where he helped to establish the Centre for Social Policy, with a focus on the future of the working society and the new social movements, in the context of ecological crises. After German reunification he taught at the Humboldt University of Berlin from 1995 to 2005, where he was part of the founding generation of renewed social science, interested in the changes in Europe and its integration. Offe taught from 2005 to 2010 political sociology at the Hertie School of Governance, a private university in Berlin that he co-founded.

He made substantial contributions to understanding the relationships between democracy and capitalism. His work focused on economies and states in transition to democracy. He was able to find new approaches and perspectives on a wide range of topics such as analysis of social crises, welfare state, the transformation of Eastern Europe, European integration, unconditional basic income, civil society and the common good. A left-leaning German academic, he is counted among the second generation of the Frankfurt School.

Offe was founding member of the Greens. In politics, he advised Social Democrats to collaborate with the Greens already in the late 1970s.

=== Basic income ===
Offe was one of the founding members of the Basic Income European Network, a network that later renamed to Basic Income Earth Network, and he wrote several articles and books around the idea from the 1980s.

To the article "A Basic Income for All" by Philippe Van Parijs in Boston Review, Offe published a response. Offe clarified some of his thoughts about the universal basic income and how to get there. He started by saying that he agreed with Van Parijs that basic income clearly was a "morally attractive arrangement" and also thought that Van Parijs provided a "normatively compelling argument for it in terms of real freedom and social justice". He moved on to the question of why so many people, both elites and non-elites, seemed reluctant or even against the idea of an unconditional basic income. He argued that one way of looking at this was to acknowledge that certain groups may well have legitimate or rational reasons to fear the introduction of unconditional basic income. Employers may, for example, fear that their control over the workers may be weakened. Individuals and organizations may also fear that the "moral underpinnings of a social order" will be substantially weakened, that is the idea that everyone should work, employed or self-employed, in order to have a legitimate right to a living income. There was also the fear, he noted, that the tax will be too high.

Taking these fears into account, Offe suggested that the basic income implementation should be "governed by principles of gradualism and reversibility". Instead of thinking about basic income implementation as "before" and "after" he thought it was better to promote the system change in the dynamic terms of less and more. One way of gradually moving towards a universal basic income, according to Offe, could be to expand the list of groups, conditions and activities that were recognized as legitimate for something like a basic income already, as Tony Atkinson had proposed earlier in the name of a participation income.

=== Personal life ===
Offe married Ulrike Poppe in 2001. He died on 1 October 2025, at the age of 85.

== Publications ==
- 2014: Europe Entrapped, Cambridge: Polity Press, ISBN 978-0-7456-8751-3.
- 2010: Inequality and the Labour Market. Online: Institut für Arbeitsmarkt und Berufsforschung
- 2005: Reflections on America: Tocqueville, Weber and Adorno in the United States, Cambridge: University Press, ISBN 0-7456-3505-9.
- 1998: Institutional Design in Post-Communist Societies. Rebuilding the Ship at Sea. (with Jon Elster and Ulrich K. Preuss), Cambridge: University Press, ISBN 0-521-47386-1.
- 1996: The Varieties of Transition: The East European and East German Experience (with Jeremy Gaines), Cambridge: Polity Press, ISBN 0-7456-1608-9.
- 1996: Modernity and the State: East and West. (with Charles Turner and Jeremy Gaines), Cambridge: Polity Press, ISBN 0-7456-1674-7.
- 1982: with Volker Gransow. "Political Culture and the Politics of the Social Democratic Government". Telos 53 (Fall 1982). New York.
- 1972: Strukturprobleme des kapitalistischen Staates (essays).

=== Dissertation ===
- Offe, Claus (1977). "Leistungsprinzip und industrielle Arbeit". Das Leistungsprinzip (in German). Wiesbaden: VS Verlag für Sozialwissenschaften. pp. 102–118. doi:10.1007/978-3-322-85262-5_7. ISBN 978-3-8100-0160-3.

== Memberships ==
- 1989: Academia Europaea
- 1994: Foreign Honorary Member, American Academy of Arts and Sciences
