= Alfred Aufdenblatten =

Swiss biathlete (1897–1975)

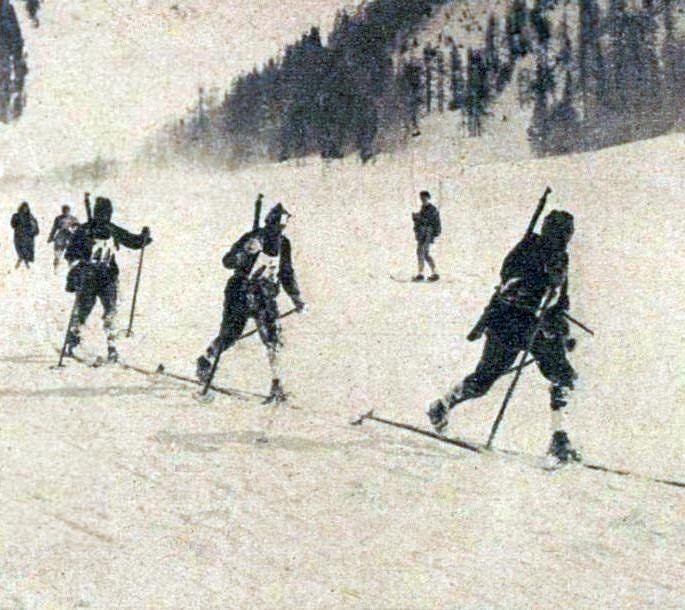

Personal information
- Born: 12 November 1897 Zermatt, Switzerland
- Died: 15 June 1975 (aged 77) Zermatt, Switzerland

Sport
- Sport: Skiing
Medal record
Representing Switzerland
Men's military patrol
Olympic Games
Gold medal – first place	1924 Chamonix	Team

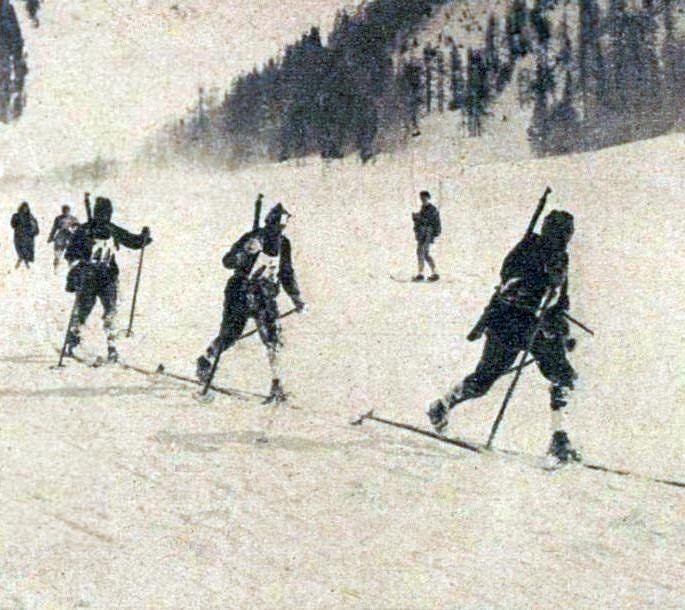
The Swiss military patrol, Olympic champions in 1924.jpg

Alfred Aufdenblatten (12 November 1897 – 17 June 1975) was a mountaineer, ski guide and cross country skier from Zermatt, Switzerland who competed in military patrol at the first winter Olympics in Chamonix in 1924.

The Swiss team, which consisted of Aufdenblatten, Alfons Julen, Anton Julen and Denis Vaucher, finished first in the competition.

Aufdenblatten also competed in the cross country 50 km at the Chamonix Olympics.

In 1929, Aufdenblatten was on a mountaineering expedition on the Grand Gendarme with two other men, when another party accidentally dislodged a rock above the group. This rock fell onto the group's guide, Franziskus Taugwalder, knocking him down the slope and killing him. Aufdenblatten and the third man, Richard Kay, managed to secure their rope and avoid being pulled down by Taugwalder's body, and thus survived.
