= Anton Julen =

Swiss cross-country skier (1898–1982)

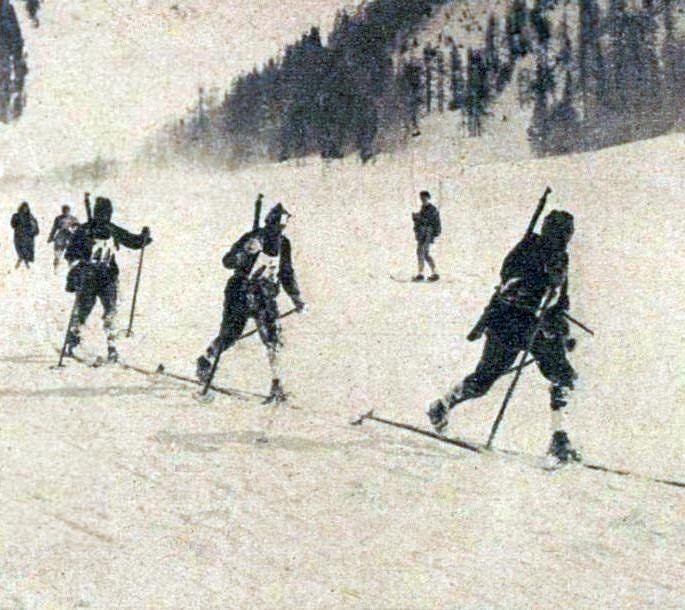

Personal information
- Born: 20 February 1898 Zermatt, Switzerland
- Died: August 1982 (aged 84)

Sport
- Sport: Skiing
Medal record
Representing Switzerland
Men's military patrol
Olympic Games
Gold medal – first place	1924 Chamonix	Team

Anton Julen (20 February 1898 – August 1982) was a cross country skier from Zermatt, Switzerland who competed in military patrol at the first winter Olympics in Chamonix in 1924. The Swiss team, which consisted of Alfred Aufdenblatten, Alfons Julen, Anton Julen and Denis Vaucher, finished first in the competition. He was brother of Alfons Julen, and cousin of the Olympians Oswald Julen (Nordic combined) and Simon Julen (cross country skiing).
