= Alfons Julen =

Swiss biathlete (1899–1988)

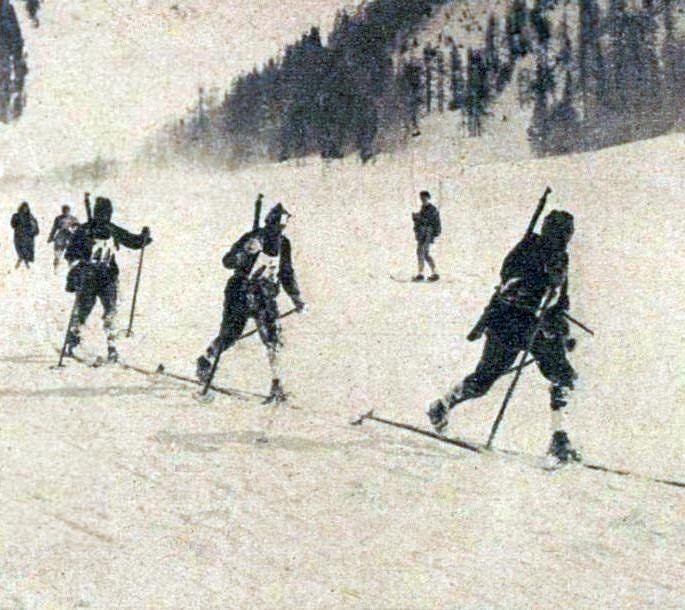

Personal information
- Born: 20 February 1899 Zermatt, Switzerland
- Died: 9 May 1988 (aged 89)

Sport
- Sport: Skiing
- Club: Skiclub Zermatt
Medal record
Representing Switzerland
Men's military patrol
Olympic Games
Gold medal – first place	1924 Chamonix	Team

Alfons Julen (20 February 1899 – 9 May 1988) was a cross country skier from Zermatt, Switzerland who competed in military patrol at the first winter Olympics in Chamonix in 1924. The Swiss team, which consisted of Alfred Aufdenblatten, Julen, Anton Julen and Denis Vaucher, finished first in the competition.

Julen competed in cross country 18 km at the 1928 Winter Olympics in St. Moritz, and in military patrol, which was a demonstration event in 1928. He was brother of Anton Julen, and cousin of the Olympians Oswald Julen (Nordic combined) and Simon Julen (cross country skiing).
