= Martin Wehrle =

German journalist and author

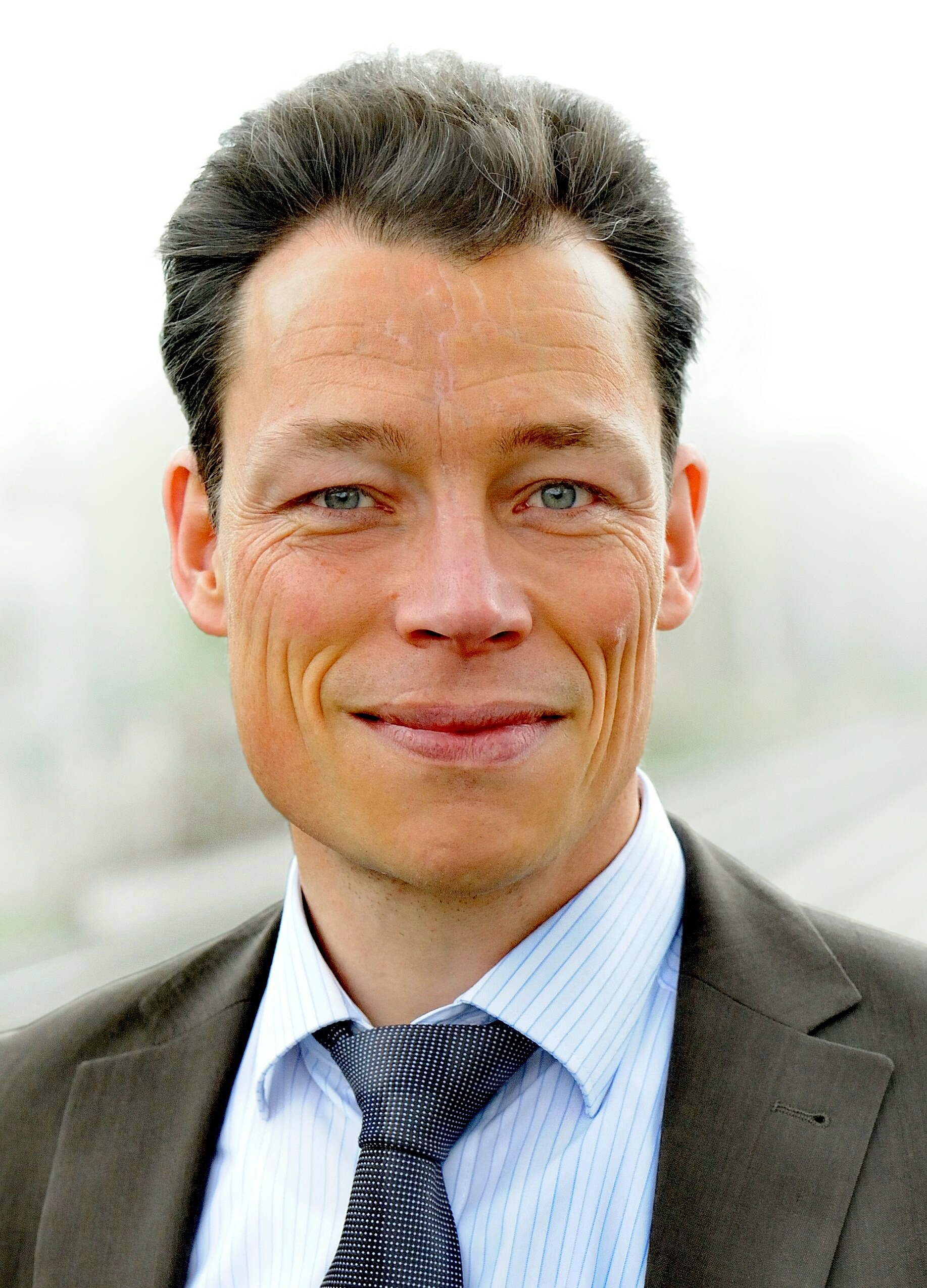
- Wehrle in 2012
- Born: 17 March 1970 (age 56); Löffingen, Baden-Württemberg, West Germany (now Germany)
- Education: Academy for Journalism in Hamburg
- Occupations: Journalist; Career advisor; Non-fiction author
- Awards: See Awards

Martin Wehrle (born 17 March 1970) is a German journalist, career advisor and non-fiction author. He is also known as an advocate of universal basic income (UBI).

== Life ==
Martin Wehrle was born on 17 March 1970 in Löffingen, Baden-Württemberg, West Germany (now part of Germany since German reunification in 1990).

He attended the Academy for Journalism in Hamburg and was deputy editor-in-chief of Blinker, a magazine for anglers. During this time he also won the European championship in pike fishing. He later headed two departments in an MDAX group and began to look at the management culture of German companies. In the early 2000s, Wehrle started his own career as a career consultant and in 2003 published the book Geheime Tricks für mehr Gehalt: ein Chef verrät, wie Sie Chefs überzeugen! (Secret tricks for higher salaries: a boss reveals how to convince bosses!) in which he gives recommendations for academics, employees, workers and young professionals who want to be better paid for their work. In the following years, he wrote more books about topics like career and salary. Today he heads the Karriereberater-Akademie (career counselor academy) in Hamburg, Germany, and, according to his own statement, has implemented the first training course for career counselors in Germany.

== Reception ==
According to German magazine Focus and Austrian magazine Kurier, Martin Wehrle is „Deutschlands bekanntester Karriere- und Gehaltscoach“ ("Germany's most famous career and salary coach").

== Awards ==
- 1993: Reportagepreis of the Akademie für Publizistik Hamburg
- 2016: Coaching-Award

== Works ==
=== Career ===
- Geheime Tricks für mehr Gehalt: Ein Chef verrät, wie Sie Chefs überzeugen (in German), München: Econ, 2003, ISBN 3-430-19542-X
- Die Geheimnisse der Chefs: So bekommen Sie Ihren Vorgesetzten in den Griff (in German), Hamburg: Hoffmann und Campe, 2004, ISBN 3-455-09442-2
- Der Feind in meinem Büro: Die großen und kleinen Irrtümer zwischen Chef und Mitarbeiter (in German), Berlin: Econ, 2005, ISBN 3-430-19543-8
- 30 Minuten für Ihre Gehaltserhöhung (in German), Offenbach: Gabal, 2006, ISBN 3-89749-622-4
- mit Uwe Kamenz (2007), Professor Untat: Was faul ist hinter den Hochschulkulissen (in German), Berlin: Econ, ISBN 978-3-430-20018-9
- Karriereberatung: Menschen wirksam im Beruf unterstützen (in German), Weinheim: Beltz, 2007, ISBN 978-3-407-36448-7
- Lexikon der Karriere-Irrtümer: Worauf es im Job wirklich ankommt (in German), Berlin: Econ, 2009, ISBN 978-3-430-20059-2
- Das Chefhasser-Buch: Ein Insider rechnet ab (in German), München: Knaur, 2009, ISBN 978-3-426-78161-6
- Die 100 besten Coaching-Übungen: Das große Workbook für Einsteiger und Profis zur Entwicklung der eigenen Coaching-Fähigkeiten (in German), Bonn: ManagerSeminare, 2010, ISBN 978-3-941965-05-8
- Am liebsten hasse ich Kollegen: Wie man den Büroalltag überlebt (in German), München: Knaur, 2010, ISBN 978-3-426-78281-1
- 30 Minuten Karrieresprung (in German), Offenbach: Gabal, 2010, ISBN 978-3-86936-136-9
- Ich arbeite in einem Irrenhaus: Vom ganz normalen Büroalltag (in German), Berlin: Econ, 2011, ISBN 978-3-430-20097-4
- Handbuch Fantasiereisen: Für Training, Coaching, Beratung, Jugendarbeit und Therapie (in German), Weinheim: Beltz, 2011, ISBN 978-3-407-36505-7
- So verhandeln Sie mehr Gehalt: Videotraining (in German), München: Pink University, 2011
- König Arsch. Mein Leben als Kunde – der ganz normale Wahnsinn (in German), Heyne, 2012, ISBN 978-3-453-60219-9
- mit Dirk Meissner (2012), Ich arbeite immer noch in einem Irrenhaus: Neue Geschichten aus dem Büroalltag (in German), Berlin: Econ, ISBN 978-3-430-20133-9
- Die 500 besten Coaching-Fragen: Das große Workbook für Einsteiger und Profis zur Entwicklung der eigenen Coaching-Fähigkeiten (in German), Bonn: ManagerSeminare, 2012, ISBN 978-3-941965-44-7
- Bin ich hier der Depp?: Wie Sie dem Arbeitswahn nicht länger zur Verfügung stehen (in German), München: Mosaik, 2013, ISBN 978-3-442-39251-3
- Anständig Karriere machen: Wie Sie nach oben kommen – und trotzdem Sie selbst bleiben (in German), Zürich: Orell Füssli, 2013, ISBN 978-3-280-05460-4
- 14 Fantasiereisen für den Unterricht (in German), Weinheim: Beltz, 2013, ISBN 978-3-407-62879-4
- Herr Müller, Sie sind doch nicht schwanger?!: Warum das Berufsleben einer Frau für jeden Mann ein Skandal wäre (in German), München: Mosaik, 2014, ISBN 978-3-442-39255-1
- Die 50 kreativsten Coaching-Ideen: Das große Workbook für Einsteiger und Profis zur Entwicklung der eigenen Coaching-Fähigkeiten (in German), Bonn: ManagerSeminare, 2014, ISBN 978-3-941-96593-5
- Sei einzig, nicht artig!: So sagen Sie nie mehr Ja, wenn Sie Nein sagen wollen (in German), München: Mosaik, 2015, ISBN 978-3-442-39283-4
- Die Coachings-Schatzkiste: 150 kostbare Impulse für Entdecker – darunter 50 Methoden, 30 Checklisten, 20 Storys und über 850 Coaching-Fragen (in German), Bonn: ManagerSeminare, 2016, ISBN 978-3-958-91024-9
- Der Klügere denkt nach: Von der Kunst, auf die ruhige Art erfolgreich zu sein (in German), München: Mosaik, 2017, ISBN 978-3442392841
- Noch so ein Arbeitstag, und ich dreh durch: Was Mitarbeiter in den Wahnsinn (in German), München: Mosaik, 2018, ISBN 978-3442393268
- Die Ratte: Kriminalroman (in German), Elsbethen: Benevento, 2019, ISBN 978-3710900549
- Ich könnte ihn erwürgen!: Vom einfachen Umgang mit schwierigen Menschen (in German), München: Mosaik, 2020, ISBN 978-3442393275

=== Fishing ===
- mit Bert Schröder (2003), Das Geheimnis großer Fänge: Hecht, Karpfen, Zander, Forelle, Schleie, Aale (in German), Hamburg, ISBN 3-86132-668-X, "Ein Buch der Zeitschrift Blinker"
- Fischerprüfung: Die wichtigsten Fragen richtig beantworten (in German), Stuttgart: Kosmos, 2004, ISBN 3-440-10252-1
- Angeltricks der Profis (in German), Cham: Müller Rüschlikon, 2005, ISBN 3-275-01532-X(Die besten Angeltricks der Profis (in German), Stuttgart: Müller Rüschlikon, 2013, ISBN 978-3-275-01945-8)
- Angeln ganz entspannt: Der Einsteigerkurs (in German), Stuttgart: Kosmos, 2006, ISBN 3-440-10442-7
- Die 100 wichtigsten Angel-Antworten (in German), Stuttgart: Müller Rüschlikon, 2007, ISBN 978-3-275-01604-4
- Lexikon der 100 Angel-Irrtümer (in German), Stuttgart: Müller Rüschlikon, 2008, ISBN 978-3-275-01671-6
- mit Rainer Jahnke und Richard Lütticken (2009), Der Aal: Die besten Techniken und Taktiken für den Fang (in German), Stuttgart: Kosmos, ISBN 978-3-440-11784-2
- Die Fangformel: Erfolgreich angeln mit System (in German), Stuttgart: Müller Rüschlikon, 2010, ISBN 978-3-275-01740-9
- Erfolgreich angeln jeden Tag: 365 unschlagbare Fangrezepte (in German), Stuttgart: Müller Rüschlikon, 2011, ISBN 978-3-275-01815-4
- Angeln ist irre: Die 50 besten Geschichten (in German), Stuttgart: Müller Rüschlikon, 2012, ISBN 978-3-275-01868-0
- Lexikon der 111 Angel-Irrtümer (in German), Stuttgart: Müller Rüschlikon, 2013, ISBN 978-3-275-01922-9
- Fänger statt Anfänger: Angeln lernen – der schnellste Weg (in German), Stuttgart: Müller Rüschlikon, 2014, ISBN 978-3-275-02000-3
- Echte Angler weinen nicht: 50 neue Geschichten (in German), Stuttgart: Müller Rüschlikon, 2016, ISBN 978-3-275-02075-1
