= Dm-drogerie markt =

German multinational retail store chain

dm-Drogerie markt GmbH + Co. KG
- Type: GmbH & Co. KG
- Industry: Retail
- Founded: 1973; 53 years ago
- Headquarters: Karlsruhe, Germany
- Key people: Christoph Werner (CEO)
- Revenue: €15.91 billion (2023)
- Number of employees: 79,745 (2023)
- Website: dm.de

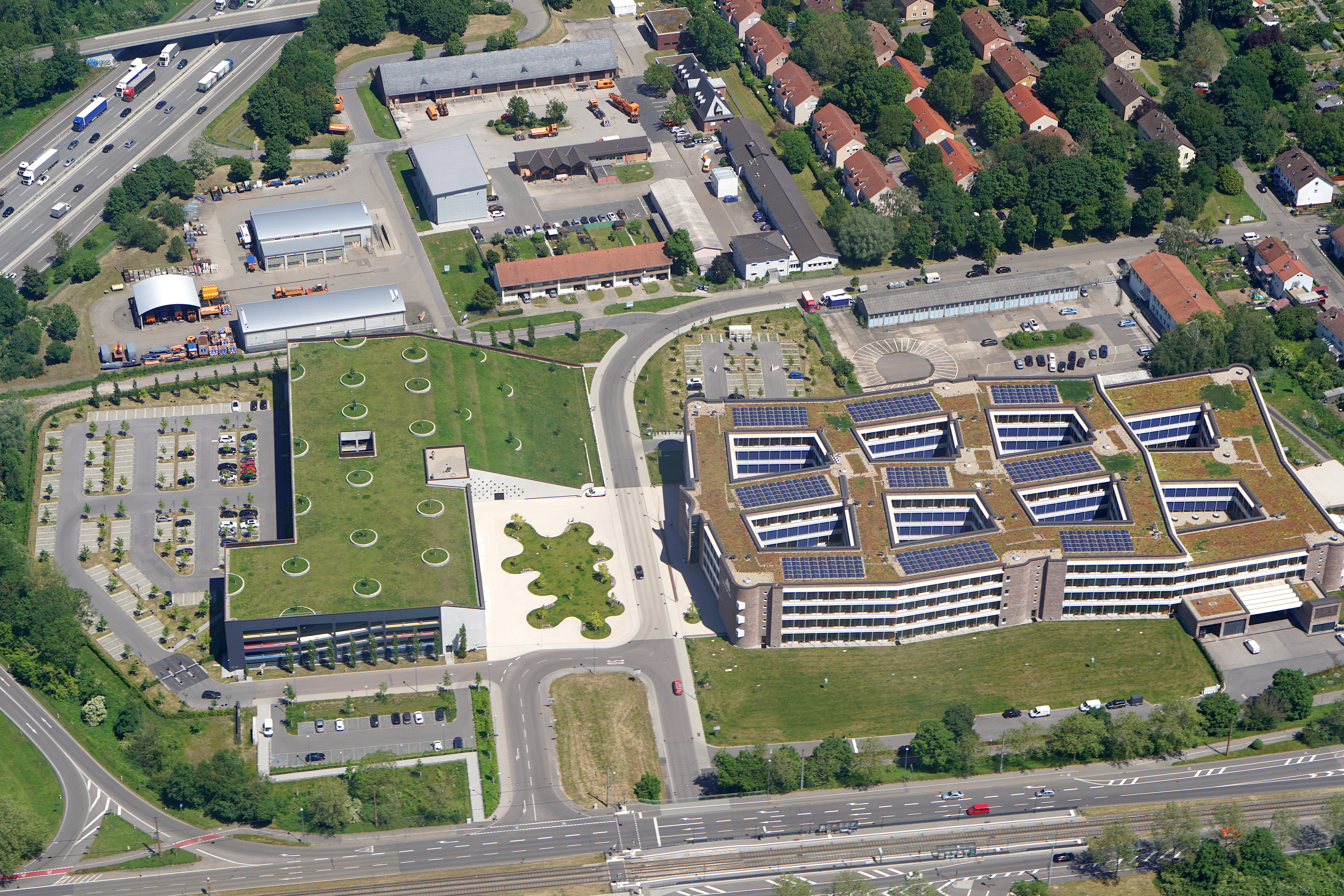
The headquarters of dm since 2019

dm-drogerie markt (usually abbreviated as dm) is a chain of retail stores headquartered in Karlsruhe, Germany, offering cosmetics, healthcare items, household products and health food and drinks. The company was founded in 1973, when it opened its first store in Karlsruhe. Its founder is anthroprosophist Götz Werner.

In its industry sector, dm-drogerie markt is Germany's largest retailer measured by revenues.

dm has more than 79,700 people employed in more than 4,000 stores in fourteen European countries. In the 1970s, dm only had outlets in Germany and Austria. In the 1990s, it opened stores in the Czech Republic, Hungary, Slovenia, Slovakia, and Croatia. In the 2000s, the company expanded to Serbia, Bosnia-Herzegovina, Romania, Bulgaria, North Macedonia, Italy and Poland.

In 2015, dm planned to organize a fundraising campaign for a Kurdish community in Germany, supported by Rupert Neudeck. The campaign sparked outrage among nationalist German Turks. They accused dm of supporting the Kurdish PKK and terrorism and called for a boycott of dm. The company withdrew from its efforts, stating that it did not want to provide "a breeding ground for escalation."

In March 2017, for the first time in its history, dm-drogerie markt started selling to consumers outside Europe with the Alibaba Group's Tmall global cross-border flagship store in China. This expansion was initiated and is managed by a Shanghai-based Tmall Partner oddity Asia.

== Employee rights ==
The company is known for promoting its flat hierarchical structures and high level of social commitment. Götz Werner has asserted that the well-being of employees is more important than the company's returns.

In 2002, 28 years after the company's founding, the first independent works councils were introduced within the group in Germany. Some employees in two distribution centers had taken the initiative and established co-determination structures. Management then decided to establish works councils in all branches. One works council member called this a "clever move" by dm management, as they had targeted selected employees at the time and thereby deliberately sidelined employees who were critical of management.

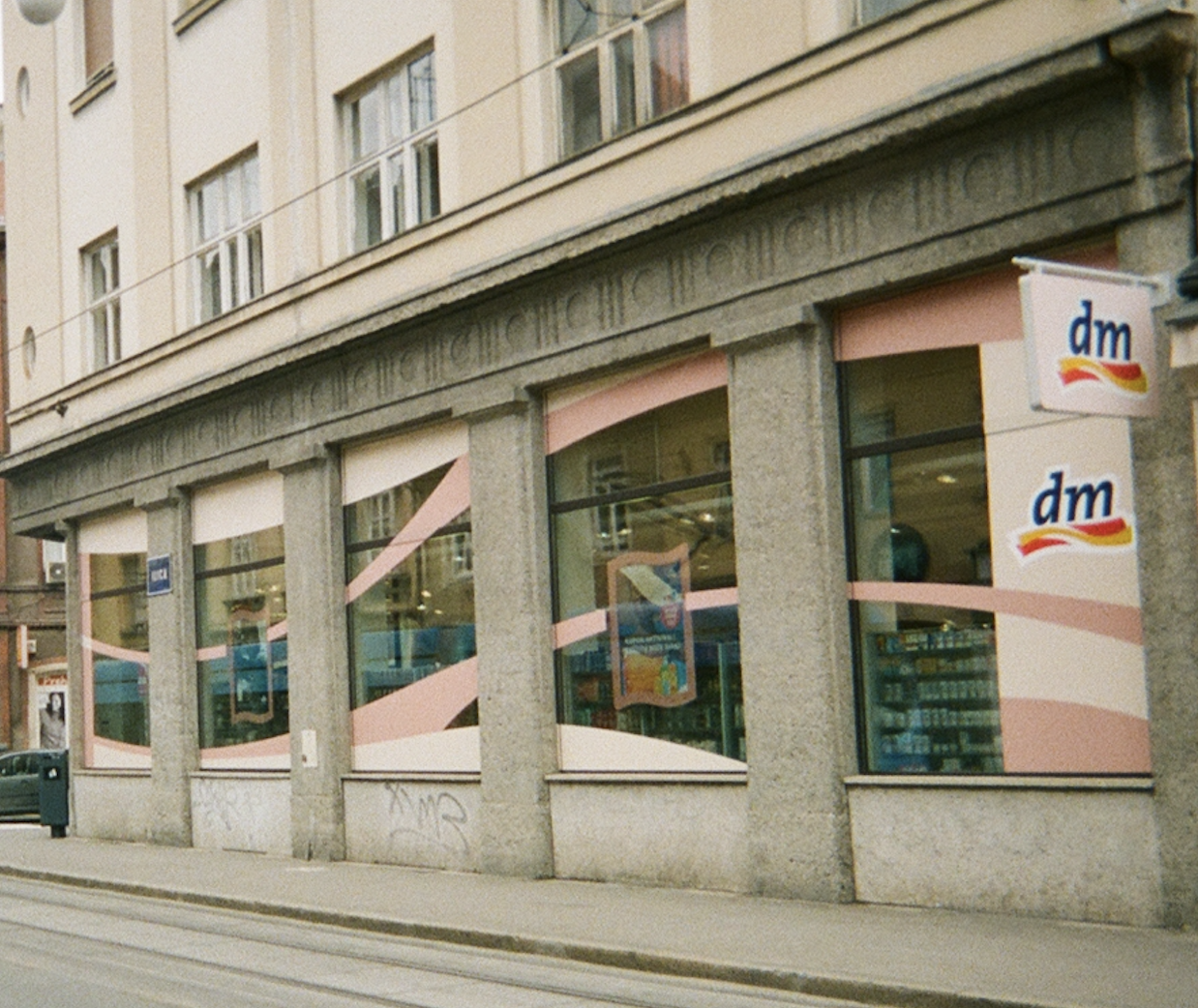
DM store in Zagreb, Croatia

== Locations ==
Figures for the number of stores in Europe as of 6 December 2025:

Country	Since	No. of stores
Austria	1976	381
Bosnia and Herzegovina	2006	94
Bulgaria	2009	119
Croatia	1996	180
Czech Republic	1993	261
Germany	1973	2156
Hungary	1993	263
Italy	2017	93
North Macedonia	2012	25
Poland	2022	75
Romania	2007	167
Serbia	2004	134
Slovakia	1995	172
Slovenia	1993	101

== See also ==
- Müller
- Rossmann
