= 2016 Swiss referendums =

National referendums held in Switzerland in 2016

Thirteen national referendums were held in Switzerland during 2016.

== February referendums ==
On 28 February 2016, referendums were held on four initiatives:

1. Popular initiative of 5 November 2012 "For the couple and the family - No to the penalty of marriage", proposed by the Christian Democrats. It would have prohibited discrimination in taxes for married couples (who pay more in certain circumstances) compared to other cohabiting couples, but it would also have added the definition of marriage being "the union of a man and a woman". Opposition to the initiative was mainly because it would make opening marriage to same-sex couples no longer possible under the constitution. (The referendum on this initiative was invalidated in a 10 April 2019 decision of the Federal Supreme Court, which ordered a re-vote.)
2. Popular initiative of 28 December 2012 "For the effective expulsion of foreign criminals", proposed by the Swiss People's Party which claimed it would provide full implementation of an initiative approved in a November 2010 referendum. Foreigners who commit a crime would be automatically expelled from the country, regardless of the severity of the crime.
3. Popular initiative of 24 March 2014 "No speculation on food", proposed by the Young Socialists.
4. Modification of 26 September 2014 of the federal law on road transit in the Alpine region (Reconstruction of the Gotthard road tunnel). It allowed building a second road tunnel in order for the current tunnel to be reconstructed. This government plan was challenged to a referendum by opposition groups who fear the four lanes would eventually be used, increasing traffic, and who considered it too costly.

The government recommended the rejection of all three popular initiatives, but recommended approval of the amendments to the federal law on road transit in the Alpine region. The vote results followed these recommendations, with higher voter turnout than usual.

=== Results ===
Question	For		Against		Invalid/ blank	Total votes	Registered voters	Turnout	Cantons for		Cantons against		Result
Question	Votes	%	Votes	%	Invalid/ blank	Total votes	Registered voters	Turnout	Full	Half	Full	Half	Result
For the couple and the family	1,609,152	49.2	1,664,224	50.8	80,643	3,354,019	5,302,797	63.2	15	3	5	3	Rejected
Expulsion of foreign criminals	1,375,098	41.1	1,966,965	58.9	37,504	3,379,567	5,302,797	63.7	3	3	17	3	Rejected
No speculation on food	1,287,786	40.1	1,925,937	59.9	122,455	3,336,178	5,302,797	62.9	1	1	19	5	Rejected
Gotthard road tunnel reconstruction	1,883,859	57.0	1,420,390	43.0	61,319	3,365,568	5,302,797	63.5					Accepted
Source: Government of Switzerland 1, 2, 3, 4

== June referendums ==
Five propositions were on the ballot for the 5 June 2016 referendum:

1. A popular initiative for a basic income.
2. A popular initiative for fair transport financing. According to this initiative, revenue from fuel tax would have been used exclusively for road construction.
3. A popular initiative for public service. Launched by four news and consumer rights magazines, this initiative sought to improve public services by mandating that the government not set any profitmaking goals for public services, that any profits not fund the overall budget, and that public service directors would not earn more than the corresponding government minister.
4. A referendum on amendments to the medically assisted reproduction law.
5. A referendum on amendments to the federal asylum law.

All three popular initiatives were rejected, whilst the two legislative amendments were approved. The voters thus again followed the recommendations of the government.

=== Medically assisted reproduction (MAR) ===
The law establishes that all embryos conceived in a test tube can be examined using all the genetic techniques available, and then selected. In this way, embryos with Down syndrome (trisomy 21) can be destroyed before implantation.

=== Asylum law ===
The new law provided free legal advice and representation for all asylum seekers, and speeding-up procedures for granting or refusing asylum. It also established new federal reception centers run by the federal government and staffed by federal officials where most asylum seekers would be accommodated.

=== Basic income referendum ===
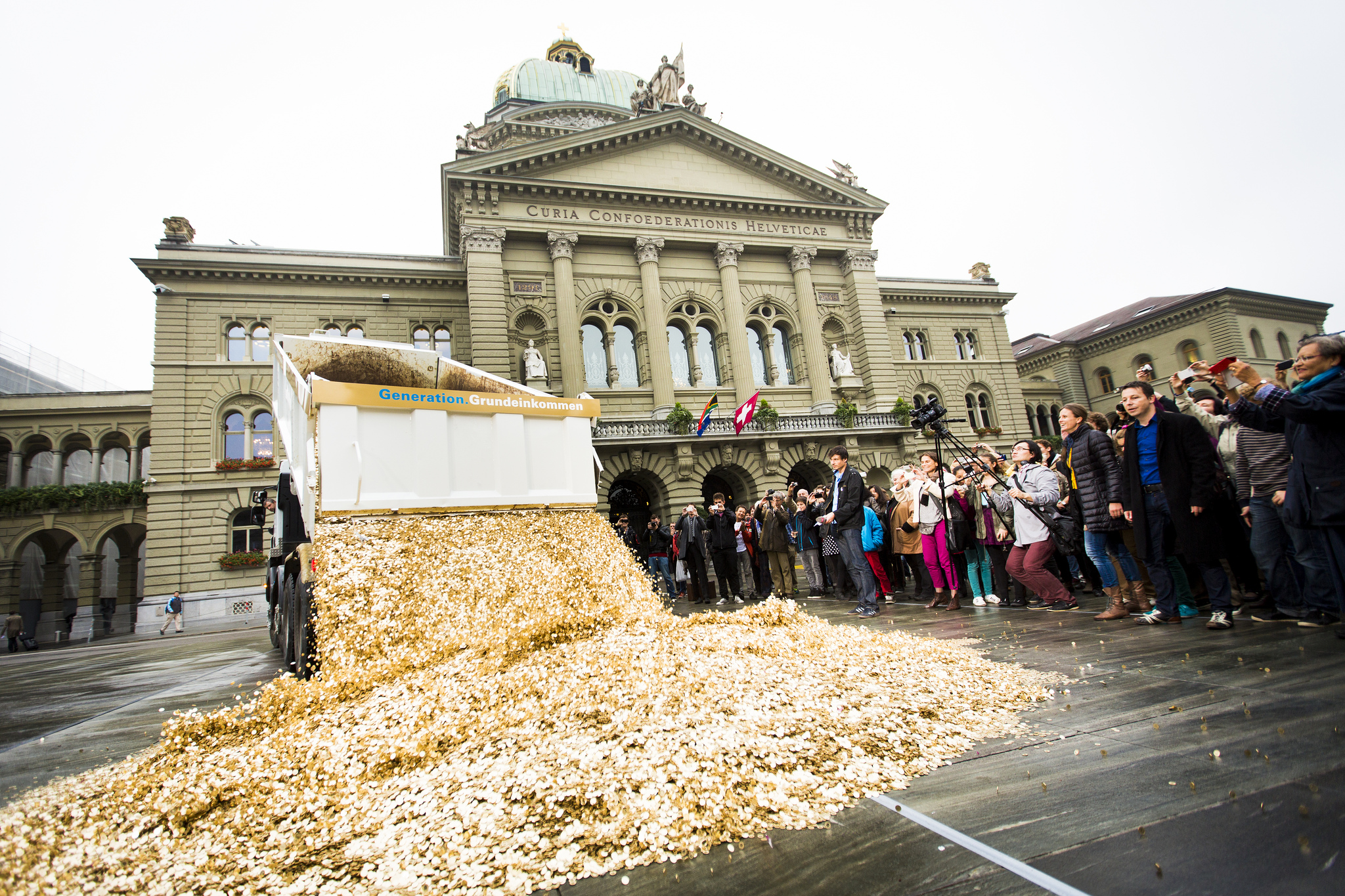
In 2013, eight million 5-cent coins (one per inhabitant) were dumped on the Bundesplatz to support the popular initiative for a basic income.

The discussion about basic income in Switzerland began in the 1980s, initially amongst academics such as sociologists who saw the potential to alleviate poverty better than the current system. There was no major public debate in the 1980s nor the 1990s; however, in the early 2000s, things were slowly changing due to a spill-over from the German debate. Two basic income organizations were formed, Initiative Grundeinkommen and BIEN-Switzerland, and one ATTAC-group also became advocates. These organizations had some success, including some articles in national newspapers. The petition calling for a referendum on basic income as a constitutional right was started in April 2012. After six months 42,000 people had signed, and by April 2013 there were approximately 70,000 signatures. By October 2013, more than 130,000 citizens had signed, meaning a referendum on the issue had to be held. Publicity included a truck filled with eight million coins emptying the money in front of the Federal Palace in Bern. Even though the initiative's official text submitted to the vote did not specify any level, the campaigners proposed 2,500 Swiss francs for adults (about US$1,650 at PPP in 2014) and 625 francs for children per month.

=== Results ===
Question	For		Against		Invalid/ blank	Total votes	Registered voters	Turnout	Cantons for		Cantons against		Result
Question	Votes	%	Votes	%	Invalid/ blank	Total votes	Registered voters	Turnout	Full	Half	Full	Half	Result
Basic income	568,660	23.1	1,897,528	76.9	28,660	2,494,848	5,313,442	46.95	0	0	20	6	Rejected
For fair transport financing	709,974	29.2	1,719,661	70.8	55,749	2,485,384	5,313,442	46.78	0	0	20	6	Rejected
For public services	784,303	32.4	1,637,707	67.6	62,997	2,485,007	5,313,442	46.77	0	0	20	6	Rejected
Amendments to the medically assisted reproduction law	1,490,417	62.4	897,318	37.6	92,610	2,480,345	5,313,442	46.68					Approved
Amendments to the federal asylum law	1,616,597	66.8	804,086	33.2	65,349	2,486,032	5,313,442	46.79					Approved
Source: Government of Switzerland 1, 2, 3, 4, 5

== September referendums ==
Three referendums were held on 25 September 2016; a popular initiative for a green economy (launched by the Green Party of Switzerland), a popular initiative concerning the retirement system and a referendum on the federal law on intelligence. Both of the popular initiatives were rejected, whilst the federal intelligence law was approved.

=== Results ===
Question	For		Against		Invalid/ blank	Total votes	Registered voters	Turnout	Cantons for		Cantons against		Result
Question	Votes	%	Votes	%	Invalid/ blank	Total votes	Registered voters	Turnout	Full	Half	Full	Half	Result
Green economy	819,770	36.4	1,430,273	63.6	41,427	2,291,470	5,329,183	43.0	1	0	19	6	Rejected
Retirement system	921,375	40.6	1,348,032	59.4	29,085	2,298,492	5,329,183	43.1	5	0	15	6	Rejected
Federal intelligence law	1,459,068	65.5	768,065	34.5	61,416	2,288,549	5,329,183	42.9					Approved
Source: Government of Switzerland 1, 2, 3

== November referendum ==
The 27 November referendum had only one question, a federal popular initiative "for the programmed phase-out of nuclear energy" (against nuclear power plants). The initiative dated from 2012, about one year after the Fukushima Daiichi nuclear disaster in Japan. It was rejected by voters.

Question	For		Against		Invalid/ blank	Total votes	Registered voters	Turnout	Cantons for		Cantons against		Result
Question	Votes	%	Votes	%	Invalid/ blank	Total votes	Registered voters	Turnout	Full	Half	Full	Half	Result
Nuclear energy phase-out	1,099,409	45.8	1,300,860	54.2	21,729	2,421,998	5,336,711	45.4	4	2	16	4	Rejected
Source: Government of Switzerland
