= Denis Vaucher =

Swiss biathlete (1898–1993)

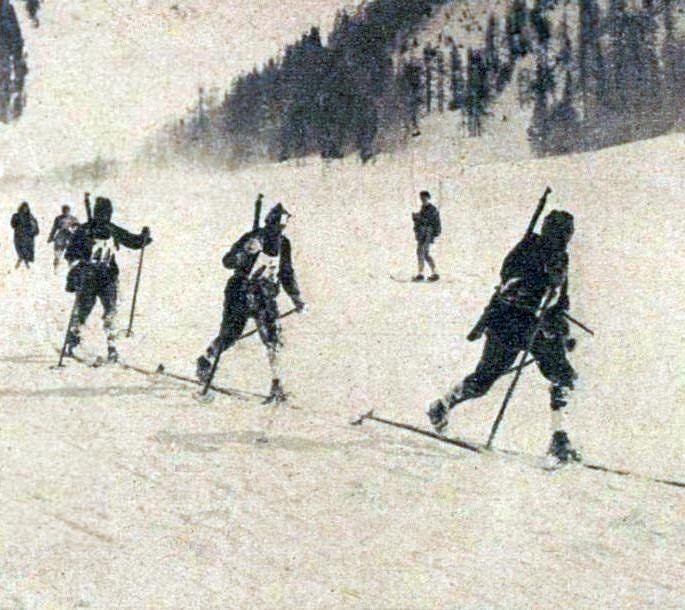

Personal information
- Born: 18 February 1898
- Died: 24 February 1993 (aged 95)

Sport
- Sport: Skiing
Medal record
Representing Switzerland
Men's military patrol
Olympic Games
Gold medal – first place	1924 Chamonix	Team

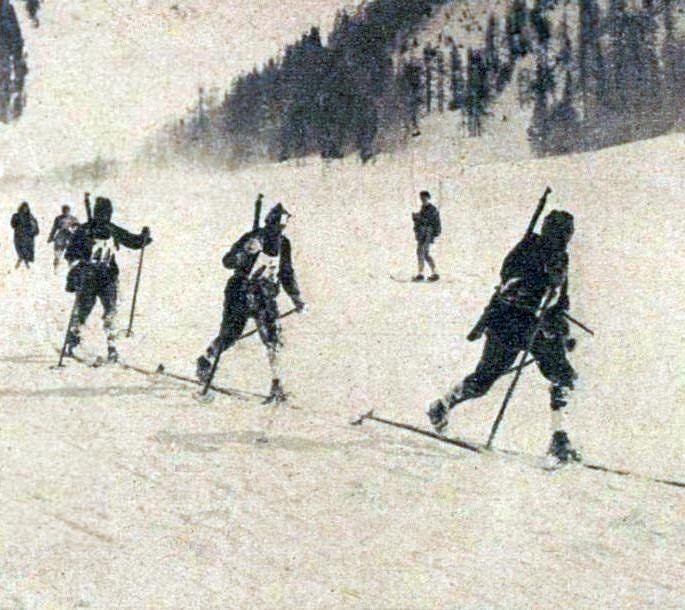
The Swiss military patrol, Olympic champions in 1924.jpg

Denis Vaucher (18 February 1898 – 24 February 1993) was a cross country skier from Bern, Switzerland who competed in military patrol at the first winter Olympics in Chamonix in 1924.

The Swiss team, which consisted of Alfred Aufdenblatten, Alfons Julen, Anton Julen and Vaucher, finished first in the competition.

Vaucher was a member of the Skiclub Bern, which was founded in 1900.
