= Fritz Neumark =

German economist (1900–1991)

Fritz Neumark (20 July 1900, Hanover – 9 March 1991, Baden-Baden) was a German economist. He made important contributions to the development of education in the preparation of the income tax laws of economics in Turkey.

== Early life ==
He was born in 1900. As he was Jewish-German, he emigrated to Istanbul (Turkey) in 1933, to avoid the Third Reich. He later moved back to Germany, and served two terms as Rector of the Goethe University Frankfurt (1954–1955 and 1961–1962).

== Career ==
He was faculty member at Istanbul University, where he taught finance and economics. He published many books in the Turkish language.

The Fiscal and Financial Committee set up by the European Commission in 1960 under the chairmanship of Professor Neumark made its priority objective the elimination of distortions to competition caused by disparities in national indirect tax systems: Following publication of the Neumark Committee Report in 1962, it was recommended that a value-added tax, as used in France, be adopted across the European Economic Community.
