= David Casassas =

Spanish sociologist

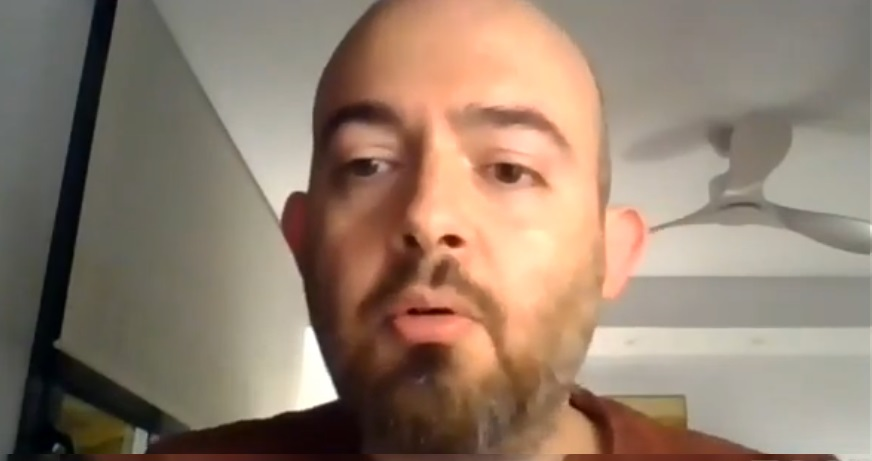
Casassas in 2021

David Casassas (born 1975) is a Spanish academic and publicist.

== Life and career ==
Casassas was born in 1975 in Barcelona, Catalonia, Spain.

He is a lecturer in social and political theory at the University of Barcelona and a member of the Research Group on Socioeconomic Ethics and Epistemology of Social Sciences (GREECS).

He is the former secretary of the Basic Income Earth Network (BIEN) and is currently the vice president of the Basic Income Network.

== Publications (selection) ==
- La ciudad en llamas. The validity of commercial republicanism of Adam Smith, Montesinos, 2010.
- with Daniel Raventós: Basic income in the era of great inequalities, Montesinos, 2011.
- Revertir el script. Jobs, rights and freedom, Los Libros de la Catarata, 2016.
- as publisher: Boreal Invierno Austral, Animal Suspechoso, 2016.
- unconditional freedom. Basic income in the democratic revolution, Paidós, 2018.
