= Julen Bollain =

Spanish economist, politician and researcher

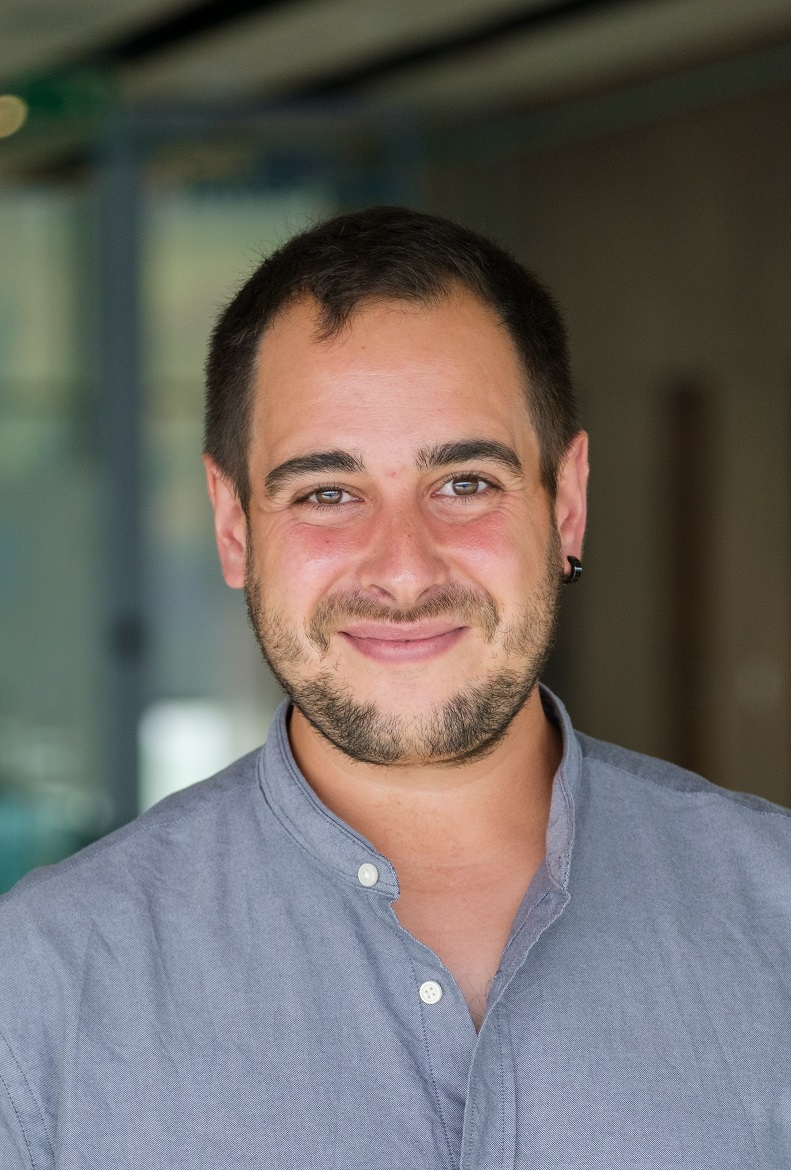
- Bollain
- Born: 28 March 1990 (age 36); Éibar, Spain
- Education: University of the Basque Country; Université Saint-Louis; Oxford Brookes University
- Occupations: Economist, professor, researcher
- Office: Member of the Basque Parliament
- Political party: Podemos (2014-2020)
- Website: Twitter

Julen Bollain (born 28 March 1990 in Éibar), Ph.D. in Development Studies, is an economist, professor, and researcher at Mondragon University, specializing in development studies and basic income.

== Career ==
=== Academic career ===
He is a member of the Board of the Spanish Basic Income Network and a lifetime member of the Basic Income Earth Network (BIEN). He frequently gives talks and attends both national and international conferences. He also frequently writes articles and serves as a professor in the postgraduate program in Contemporary Capitalism Analysis: Republican-Socialist Tools, offered by the University of Barcelona.

=== Publications ===
Bollain has contributed to various books, including The Palgrave International Handbook of Basic Income, coordinated by Malcolm Torry and edited by Palgrave Macmillan. In 2021, he published his first solo book "Renta Básica: Una herramienta para el futuro," followed by a second edition in 2022 due to its success, just two months after its initial publication. In September 2023, he published his latest book "Renta Básica ¿Por qué es justa y cómo se financia?" with Ediciones Deusto.

=== Political career ===
He was a member of Podemos from its inception until February 2020. Additionally, he served as the secretary-general of this party in Éibar from 2 January 2015, having been elected by the members with 55% of the votes.

He ran in the 2016 Basque regional election for Elkarrekin Podemos, winning a parliamentary seat on 21 October 2016. He became the youngest MP of the XI legislature. He served as the economic spokesperson for the coalition and also as President of the Health Committee of the Basque Parliament.

== Relevant publications and academic contributions ==
=== Books ===
- Renta Básica: ¿por qué es justa y cómo se financia?
- Renta Básica: Una herramienta de futuro
- Hoy es mañana
- The Palgrave International Handbook of Basic Income (pp. 407–435)

=== Academic papers ===
- Bollain, J. & Raventós, D. (2026). Reclaiming Basic Income: A Republican-Socialist Path to Freedom. Political Studies Review, 1-17.
- Olaizola-Alberdi, J., Bollain, J. & Imaz Alias, O. (2026). Cooperatives and the CSRD: do sector agnostic ESRS reflect their distinctive value?. Sustainability Accounting, Management and Policy Journal, 1-34.
- Olaizola-Alberdi, J., Imaz Alias, O., Bollain, J. & Herce-Leceta, B. (2025). Redefining the model: cooperatives in the just ecosocial transition paradigm. Iberoamerican journal of development studies, 14(1), 80-105.
- Bollain, J., Arcarons, J., Raventós, D., & Torrens, L. (2024). From theory to practice: Designing a European basic income. Poverty & Public Policy, 1–29.
- Bollain, J., Guerendiain-Gabás, I., Arnoso-Martínez, M. & Elías, Á. (2024). Exploring Young People’s Attitudes Towards Basic Income. Basic Income Studies, (early view).
- Bollain, J. (2024). Abolishing poverty in the Basque Country: Two feasible basic income models. Journal of Poverty and Social Justice, 23(3), 418–442.
- Bollain, J. & Raventós, D. (2024). The efficiency of basic income compared to minimum income schemes. Global Political Economy, 3(2), 191–211.
- Bullain, L. & Bollain, J. (2024). Una mirada comparativa de la gestión de las crisis en la Unión Europea. Papeles de Economía Española, 178, 40-51.
- Bollain, J. & Raventós, D. (2018). La Renta Básica Incondicional ante las limitaciones de las Rentas Mínimas. Lan harremanak: Revista de relaciones laborales, (40), 5.
- Bollain, J. (2017). Renta Básica Incondicional y Economía Social: un intento de relación. Gizarte Ekonomiaren Euskal Aldizkaria-Revista Vasca de Economía Social, (13), 31-48.
- Belaustegi, L., Bollain, J., Cerrato, J., Elías, Á. & Peña, N. (2016). Clara mayoría social a favor de una Renta Básica Incondicional en la UPV/EHU. XVI Simposio sobre la Renta Básica. Bilbao
