= Louise Haagh =

Academic and author

Louise Haagh (born 23 June 1967) is an academic expert on economic security, and social advocate who is best known for her leading role in the basic income movement. She is Professor of Politics at the University of York. She was born and grew up in Denmark, spent several years in Latin America and later settled in Britain, and is a dual Danish-British citizen. She is co-editor-in-chief of the academic journal Basic Income Studies. Since 2011, she has been Co-Chair, chair, and now Chair Emeritus of the Basic Income Earth Network. She is a former trustee and now patron of the Citizens’ Income Trust in the UK and a fellow of the Royal Society of Arts.

Her critical scholarship on basic income and democratization links both the case and scope for Basic Income to democratic development of the economy as a whole. She advocates a humanist democratic approach, and is known for her critique of a redistributive defense tied to global market expansion, both rooted in her comparative work on human economy justice and governing.

Her work looks at problems relating to the global and national politics of development, economic and democratic development and humanist justice. She has designed and carried out surveys and comparative research on the role of social and economic institutions – in particular employment institutions - in human motivation and economic development in a range of middle and high income countries.

Her 2019 book, The Case for Universal Basic Income was published by Polity Books. The book was showcased in the Stanford Social Innovation Review. Haagh has acted as an expert to international bodies, including the Council of Europe and the World Health Organization. She has appeared in the BBC, La Repubblica, El País, and the New Scientist.

== Publications ==
- Haagh, L. The Case for Universal Basic Income, Cambridge: Polity, 2019 (URL)
- Haagh, L, and Rohregger, B. ‘UBI policies and their potential for addressing health inequities’, World Health Organization Policy Paper Series – Transformative Approaches to have a Prosperous Life, 2019
- Bonelli, L. De Carenem P., Fattori, T., Haagh, L., Jeliazkova, M., Mattei, U.m Roman, D., Robens, I, Rinaldi, D., Santoro, E., Sciurba, A., Vermeire, D., Council of Europe, Living in Dignity in the Twenty-First Century, 2013.
- Goodhart, M., Haagh, L., Fung, A, Gauri, V., Globben, S., Heller, P., Pateman, C., Peruzzotti, E., Rudeiger, A., Schmitz, H., Standing, G., Wanpler, B., Wing, S., Democratic Imperatives: Innovations in Rights, Participation, and Economic Citizenship, American Political Science Association Task Force Report, 2012.
- Haagh, L., Citizenship, Labour Markets and Democratization – Chile and the Modern Sequence, Palgrave, 2002.
- Haagh, L. and Helgø, C. (editors.), Social Policy Reform and Market Governance in Latin America, Palgrave, 2002.
