= Götz Werner =

German businessman (1944–2022)

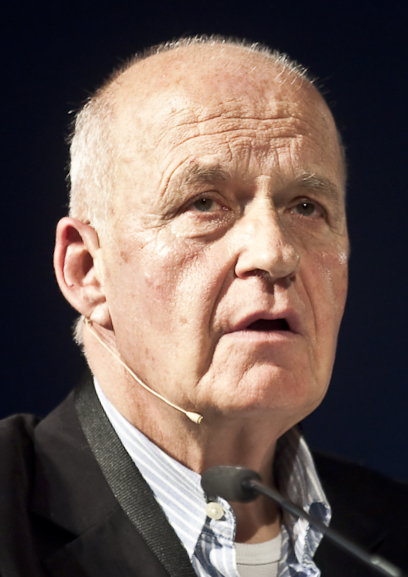
- Werner at the re:publica in 2010
- Born: Götz Wolfgang Werner; 5 February 1944; Heidelberg, Baden, Germany
- Died: 8 February 2022 (aged 78); Stuttgart, Baden-Württemberg, Germany
- Other name: Götz W. Werner
- Occupation: Businessman
- Known for: Founding dm-drogerie markt UBI advocate
- Children: 7

Götz Wolfgang Werner (5 February 1944 – 8 February 2022) was a German billionaire businessman and founder of the dm-drogerie markt retail store chain. He was also known as an advocate of universal basic income (UBI).

In 2013, Manager Magazin estimated his net worth to be around €1.1 billion, making him the 109th-richest German.

== Personal life ==
Werner was born as the fifth child of a third-generation druggist family. His mother came from Prussia and had studied psychology. An enthusiastic rower, he won the German youth championship title in double sculls in 1963.

Werner was married twice and had seven children. Werner's eldest son, Christoph Werner (born 1972), has been chairman of the dm management board since 2019, having previously worked for the pharmaceutical company GlaxoSmithKline in the USA. He died in Stuttgart on 8 February 2022, at the age of 78.

== Career ==
"Repeated a year at school, left after eleven years of schooling. German youth rowing champion, trained as a chemist, became an authorised signatory. Rejected son. Reluctant dreamer. Founder against his will."

— Götz Werner, Womit ich nie gerechnet habe. Die Autobiographie (What I never expected. The autobiography)

After completing his secondary school education, Werner attended a business school in Konstanz, where he completed an apprenticeship as a druggist. In 1968, he joined his parents' drugstore business in Heidelberg. In 1969, he moved to the large drugstore Idro in Karlsruhe, owned by the Carl Roth company. After reorganising the sales department, he also suggested to the management that they introduce the discount store principle, but with qualified customer advice. His ideas were rejected.

Werner then left his employer and started his own business. In 1973, Werner co-founded his first drugstore, dm-drogerie markt, a German drugstore chain, in Karlsruhe. The name of the new company, dm, is short for "Drogeriemarkt" (drugstore). After opening a second branch, however, he lacked the money for further expansion, so Günther Lehmann, then a partner in the supermarket chain Pfannkuch, stepped in. In return, he received 50 percent of the shares in the company.

In 1976, Werner expanded into the Austrian market. Werner's former rowing partner Günter Bauer headed dm-Austria until his death. By 1978, there were more than 100 branches in Germany. In the 2010/2011 fiscal year, there were 2,536 stores in eleven European countries. The company employed around 36,000 people, who generated sales of more than €6 billion in 2010/11. Werner led the company for 35 years. He retired from operational management in mid-May 2008 and moved to the supervisory board. He was succeeded by his then deputy, Erich Harsch, who had been working for dm for almost 27 years at that point.

From October 2003 till September 2010, he was the head of the Cross-Department Group for Entrepreneurial Studies at the Karlsruhe Institute of Technology as the successor to Reinhold Würth. In 2008, Werner was appointed visiting professor in the economics department at Alanus University of Arts and Social Sciences, where he taught students in the bachelor's degree programs "Business Administration – Rethinking Economics" and "Sustainable Management". From 2005 to 2018, he was president of the EHI Retail Institute (EHI). Since 2011, he has been a curator at the IFF Institute for Family Businesses in Stuttgart.

According to information from the press office of dm-drogerie markt, Werner was a member of the supervisory board of the customer loyalty program Payback until its takeover by American Express in 2011. He was also a member of the supervisory board of the Witten/Herdecke Student Society and the GLS Bank (2003–2015).

== Business concept ==
Initially, Werner took a conventional approach, largely adopting the discount store principle (self-service, high discount rates due to bulk purchases) from the food retail sector for the drug store market. This was prompted by the abolition of price fixing for drug store products in 1973. As the company expanded, this innovative business model became increasingly bureaucratic and cumbersome. In the early 1990s, Werner gradually changed the internal organisational structure. The stores were given increasing responsibility and autonomy. Today, dm stores determine their own product range, work schedules, some of their supervisors, and even salaries. According to analysts, this freedom for employees to make decisions is the reason for the competitive low prices of many products and high employee satisfaction and customer satisfaction.

Werner's unique style of management attracted nationwide attention. The application of a distinctly non-authoritarian management concept, known as dialogical leadership, is based on the fundamental values of understanding and respect. Werner preferred dialogue to instruction in his company.

Werner was an avowed anthroposophist and based his corporate philosophy on the principles of personal development, trust, and creativity. As a result, he did not view his employees as personnel costs, but rather as "creative assets" with "employee income". He regarded bonus and incentive systems as "permanent mistrust" of his employees' willingness to perform. Nevertheless, at the end of each tertiary, a so-called "tertiary final payment" (of variable amount) was paid to those employees whose branch had achieved or exceeded the planned target.

His training concept, which received several awards, was also unique. All trainees completed theatre projects during their training.

== Political and social engagement ==
Inspired by Rudolf Steiner's teachings of anthroposophy, Werner was one of the most influential advocates of basic income in Germany (1000 Euros for everyone). He started publicly advocating for it in 2005. The origins of his ideas date back to 1982, when the unemployment rate in the Germany had reached an all-time high. The financing of the basic income is based on the gradual abolition of income tax and the simultaneous increase of value added tax as a "consumption tax" to 100 percent. In November 2005, he founded the initiative Unternimm die Zukunft (Become an entrepreneur of the future). Werner supported the newly founded party Bündnis Grundeinkommen (Basic Income Alliance) and recommended voting for it.

Werner promoted cultural and social projects such as the Hermann Hesse Prize, and a day centre and a refuge for street children in Alexandria, Egypt. On August 16, 2010, it was announced that Werner was transferring his shares in dm to a charitable foundation.

== Awards and honours ==
- 2004: Initiative Award for Training and Further Education from the Deutsche Industrie- und Handelskammertag, the Otto-Wolff-Stiftung and the magazine Wirtschaftswoche
- 2005: Manager Award from the Bundesverband Deutscher Unternehmensberatungen
- 2007: Heckerhut from the SPD district association in Konstanz
- 2008: Entrepreneur of the Year in the 'Trade' category from Ernst & Young
- 2008: Bundesverdienstkreuz I. Klasse (already awarded the Bundesverdienstkreuz am Bande in 2004)
- 2010: Deutscher Handelspreis in the 'Lifetime Award' category
- 2012: Induction into the Hall of Fame of Manager Magazine; laudatory speech by philosopher Peter Sloterdijk on Werner's life's work
- 2014: Deutscher Gründerpreis in the category 'Life's Work'
- 2015: Erich-Fromm-Prize
- 2015: Mercator Professorship
- 2019: Order of Merit of Baden-Württemberg

== Bibliography ==
- Einkommen für alle. Der dm-Chef über die Machbarkeit des bedingungslosen Grundeinkommens. Kiepenheuer & Witsch, Cologne 2007, ISBN 978-3-462-03775-3.
- with Adrienne Goehler: 1000 € für jeden. Freiheit, Gleichheit, Grundeinkommen. Econ, Berlin 2010, ISBN 978-3-430-20108-7.
- with Claudia Cornelson: Womit ich nie gerechnet habe. Die Autobiographie, Berlin: Ullstein 2013, ISBN 978-3-430-20153-7.
- with Peter Dellbrügger (publisher): Wozu Führung? Dimensionen einer Kunst. KIT Scientific Publishing, Karlsruhe 2013, ISBN 978-3-7315-0116-9.
