= Jullian =

Jullian is a surname. Notable people with the surname include:

- Camille Jullian (1859–1933), French historian, philologist, archaeologist and historian of French literature, student of Fustel de Coulanges
- Ginette Jullian (1917–1962), French spy in World War II
- Guillermo Jullian de la Fuente (1931–2008), Chilean architect and painter
- Marcel Jullian (1922–2004), French screenwriter and author
- Philippe Jullian (1919–1977), French illustrator, art historian, biographer, aesthete, novelist and dandy

== See also ==
- Julia (given name)
- Julian (disambiguation)
- Julianne
