= Simon Julen =

Swiss cross-country skier (1897–1951)

Personal information
- Nationality: Swiss
- Born: 3 May 1897; Zermatt, Switzerland
- Died: 27 March 1951 (aged 53); Zermatt, Switzerland

Sport
- Sport: Cross-country skiing

Simon Julen (3 May 1897 – 27 March 1951) was a Swiss cross-country skier. He competed in the men's 50 kilometre event at the 1924 Winter Olympics.
