= Basic Income Earth Network =

Network of persons interested in basic income

- Abbreviation: BIEN
- Formation: 1986
- Type: Non-governmental organisation
- Legal status: Charitable Incorporated Organisation
- Headquarters: 286 Ivydale Road, London SE15 3DF, United Kingdom
- Members: basicincome.org/about-bien/membership
- Official language: English
- Chair: Sarath Davala
- Vice-Chair: Hilda Latour
- Secretary: Diana Bashur
- Treasurer: Malcolm Torry
- Main organ: Executive Committee / General Assembly
- Website: basicincome.org
- Remarks: Updated in 2023
- Formerly called: Basic Income European Network

The Basic Income Earth Network (BIEN; until 2004 Basic Income European Network) is a network of academics and activists interested in the idea of basic income.

== See also ==
- Citizen's dividend
- Universal basic income
- Universal basic income around the world
