= United States v. Spy Factory, Inc. =

United States criminal case

- Court: United States District Court for the Southern District of New York
- Full case name: United States of America v. The Spy Factory, Inc. d/b/a "Spy Factory", Ronald Kimball, Marlin Richardson, a/k/a "Brud", and Tracy Edward Ford
- Decided: July 31, 1997, August 1, 1997, August 1, 1997 & August 29, 1997 (judgments); January 7, 1997 as amended February 6, 1997 (regarding motion to dismiss for vagueness and to change venue); March 11, 1997 (regarding motion to reconsider vagueness, to sever defendants, etc.)
- Citations: 951 F.Supp. 450 (S.D.N.Y. 1997); 960 F.Supp. 684 (S.D.N.Y. 1997)

Holding
- 18 U.S.C. § 2512, which prohibits the knowing manufacture, assembly, possession, sale, transmission (by mail or interstate commerce) or advertisement of devices "primarily useful for the purpose of the surreptitious interception of wire, oral, or electronic communications", is not unconstitutionally vague. (Note: Several other procedural issues were also resolved in the published opinions: the Southern District of New York is the appropriate venue, severance would be wasteful of judicial resources, additional discovery and inspection of grand jury minutes are unnecessary and the charges are already specified with sufficient particularity.)

Court membership
- Judge sitting: Sonia Sotomayor

United States v. Spy Factory, Inc. (Note: Two opinions regarding procedural motions were published as 951 F.Supp. 450 (1997) and 960 F.Supp. 684 (1997). The judgments were not published.) was a criminal case dealing with the largest chain of surveillance equipment shops in the United States, the San Antonio, Texas-based Spy Factory. The store and its officers Ronald Kimball, Marlin Richardson and Tracy Edward Ford were indicted on a total of 70 counts related to smuggling of and illegal trade in equipment used for wiretapping and surveillance. Despite motions to dismiss the case because of the alleged vagueness of 18 U.S.C. § 2512 and other issues, the company and all three officers pleaded guilty and were convicted.

== The Spy Factory ==
The Spy Factory, Inc. was the largest chain of surveillance equipment stores (colloquially, spy shops) in the United States, with outlets in Arizona, California, Colorado, Georgia, Illinois, Missouri, Nevada, Texas, Utah and Washington. (Note: At various points in time, Spy Factory stores existed in Tucson, Arizona, Costa Mesa, Los Angeles, Sacramento, San Diego and San Francisco, California, Lakewood, Colorado, Atlanta, Georgia, Las Vegas, Nevada, San Antonio and Houston, Texas and other cities.)

The company was owned by Ronald Kimball, a former federal agent who worked for the United States Department of Justice in Ecuador and Costa Rica, and also a purveyor of bullet-proof vehicles through his other business, Executive Armoring.

According to Kimball, "[c]orporate executives and political figures in Mexico and Latin America" were the Spy Factory's first customers; "[t]hen orders started coming in from the Middle East", and by 1991, the company did about 90% of its business overseas.

== Customs raids ==
On April 5, 1995, agents of the United States Customs Service raided surveillance equipment stores in 24 cities across the country. These raids took place following a 17-month investigation into the smuggling of electronic surveillance equipment, and involved the execution of search warrants at 40 stores.

== Indictments ==
On August 21, 1995, federal indictments were issued for three The Spy Factory, Inc. executives, as well as for the company itself. Ronald Kimball, the owner, was arrested that day in San Antonio. The next day, the deputy general manager, Tracy Edward Ford, was also arrested in San Antonio. Marlin Richardson, the general manager, had already been arrested the previous April.

The initial indictment contained eight counts per defendant, charging that the Spy Factory was involved in the illegal trafficking of more than US$1.5 million of wiretapping devices from Tokyo-based Micro Electronics. The scheme involved the supplier creating duplicate invoices: an accurate one was sent to Spy Factory headquarters, while a falsified invoice (with prices marked down by as much as 90%) was sent with the goods to avoid full payment of customs duties.

Since the government alleged that conspiracy, smuggling, possession and sale of illegal devices had taken place, the defendants were liable to serve five years' imprisonment per charge. Additionally, the government sought forfeiture of at least US$1.5 million in proceeds.

On July 11, 1996, the government entered a superseding indictment that replaced the original allegations with 70 counts. The Spy Factory, Inc. was charged with all but count 69, Kimball and Richardson with all but count 68, and Ford with counts 1, 13–16, 28–31, 43–47, 62–67 and 69–70.

== United States District Court ==
The defendants were arraigned in the United States District Court for the Southern District of New York, and tried before Justice Sonia Sotomayor. In early 1997, the defendants unsuccessfully moved to dismiss 31 of the counts, contending that the statute upon which several charges were premised, 18 U.S.C. § 2512, was unconstitutionally vague. Sotomayor also denied defendants' motion to have the case heard in the United States District Court for the Western District of Texas, which sits in San Antonio.

After a change in his counsel, defendant Ford moved for reconsideration of the vagueness argument, and simultaneously asked to be tried separately (severance), requested additional discovery, asked to inspect the grand jury minutes and requested that the government specify the charges in more detail (with a bill of particulars). Sotomayor decided that severance would be wasteful of judicial resources, that further discovery and inspection of grand jury minutes were unnecessary and the government had "more than adequately apprise[d] the defendant of the nature of the charge[s] against him".

Following the failure of both motions, all defendants pleaded guilty to a subset of the charges in July and August 1997, and were variously ordered to pay fines, make restitution, serve home confinement and/or be imprisoned. The Spy Factory itself pleaded guilty to all 69 counts against it, and was sentenced to pay a special assessment of US$13,400 and a fine of US$1, due immediately.

Ronald Kimball pleaded guilty to three counts, (Note: Kimball pleaded guilty to the 1st, 16th and 46th counts of the superseding indictment, namely conspiracy to defraud the United States, trafficking in wire interception devices (the 18 U.S.C. § 2512 issue argued earlier) and smuggling, respectively.) telling Sotomayor "I accept full responsibility for my conduct", and was sentenced to 51 months' imprisonment. He was ordered to forfeit US$2.3 million, the value of the proceeds from the sale of illegal equipment. As part of his plea agreement, Kimball relinquished all of the company's assets to the government, and agreed to close all of the stores. In response, federal agents entered Spy Factory locations and confiscated the contents and the premises. Marlin Richardson pleaded guilty to the same three counts as Kimball, and was sentenced to 46 months' imprisonment. Kimball and Richardson were ordered to pay special assessments of US$150 each.

Tracy Edward Ford also pleaded guilty (Note: Ford pleaded guilty to the 15th and 16th counts of the superseding indictment, both related to trafficking in wire interception devices contrary to 18 U.S.C. § 2512.) and was sentenced to 36 months' probation with 6 months' home confinement. Ford was prohibited from selling electronic devices while on probation, and was ordered to pay a special assessment of US$100.

== 18 U.S.C. § 2512 ==
18 U.S.C. § 2512 provides criminal penalties for the manufacture, assembly, possession, sale, transmission (by mail or interstate commerce) or advertisement of surveillance equipment, subject to certain exceptions for governments and communication service providers. Anyone intentionally engaging in the foregoing prohibited conduct, with knowledge (or reason to have knowledge) that the devices are "primarily useful for the purpose of the surreptitious interception of wire, oral, or electronic communications", is liable to be fined (pursuant to 18 U.S.C. § 3571) and/or be imprisoned for up to five years.

In a Senate Judiciary Committee report describing this law, it was explained that this prohibition was intended to apply to "the martini olive transmitter, the spike mike, the infinity transmitter, and the microphone disguised as a wristwatch, picture frame, cuff link, tie clip, fountain pen, stapler, or cigarette pack." Similarly, it was intended to exclude things like parabolic microphones, which are not considered "primarily useful for surreptitious listening", because of their ordinary use in the broadcast coverage of sporting events.
