= Community revitalization levy =

Community revitalization levy (CRL) is a real estate development financing mechanism in Canada. It is similar to tax increment financing in the United States.

By 2015 major Canadian cities had implemented community revitalization levies (CRL).

== Alberta ==
In April 2012, it was proposed that the Alberta government change regulations so that the Community Revitalization Levy (CRL) could be applied to remediation costs "incurred by a private developer."

The CRL does not currently allow the levy to be used for remediation costs incurred by a private developer. While the CRL is quite a comprehensive approach that is not widely used, it is suggested that a change in regulation to allow the levy to apply to remediation costs would provide incentive to brownfield redevelopment in applicable circumstances.

— 13 April 2012 Alberta Brownfield Redevelopment Working Group

The Calgary Municipal Land Corporation (CMLC)—an arms-length a subsidiary of the City of Calgary, established in 2007, to revisit land use in the longtime deserted chunk of land in the east downtown core along the Bow River—used a CRL to develop Downtown East Village, Calgary making Calgary the first Canadian city to use the CRL. The CMLC "committed approximately $CDN 357 million to East Village infrastructure and development" and claims that it "has attracted $CDN 2.4 billion of planned development that is expected to return $CDN 725 million of revenue to the CRL." The designated levy zone for the Rivers District CRL is wider than the East Village, making it financially sound since it collects taxes for twenty years on its anchor building, the 58-storey Bow tower, and from developments in nearby Victoria Park.

In an interview with the Calgary Sun in February 2015, Michael Brown, CRL president and CEO said they were looking into a CRL for the development of the West Village similar to that used to finance the remediation of the East Village. In August CalgaryNEXT sports complex was proposed as a potential anchor to the levy zone. Local politicians expressed concern about the funding model, which proposed that the city would front between $440 and $690 million of the projected cost, most which would only be recouped over a long period of time. Mayor Naheed Nenshi commented that one of a number of challenges to the CalgaryNEXT proposal was the requirement of a community revitalization levy, along with the need for a land contribution from the city, "and significant investments in infrastructure to make the West Village a complete and vibrant community." Edmonton, Alberta creating a CRL to revitalize the downtown with a massive development project including a new arena, park development and upgrades including sewers which total approximately $CDN 500 million. The city hopes to "generate approximately $941 million in revenue in a medium-growth scenario."

== Ontario ==
As of 2015, Toronto's mayor John Tory plans on creating a levy zone to finance a C$2.7 billion SmartTrack surface rail line project spanning 53 kilometres.

== See also ==
- Corporate welfare
- Public finance
- Value capture
