= Barack Obama College Preparatory High School =

Unbuilt high school proposal in Chicago

Barack Obama College Preparatory High School was the name announced in 2014 for a proposed selective-enrollment public high school on Chicago's Near North Side. Officials withdrew Barack Obama's name from the project later that year, and the school was postponed indefinitely in 2016.

== History ==
Mayor Rahm Emanuel announced the project on April 24, 2014, as what would have been Chicago Public Schools' eleventh selective-enrollment high school. The $60 million plan was to be funded with tax-increment-financing revenue. Plans called for the school to open in fall 2017 with nearly 300 freshmen, add one grade per year, and eventually enroll 1,200 students. The initial site was Chicago Park District property near Skinner North Classical School.

Officials withdrew Obama's name in September 2014. Emanuel said he had moved too quickly to honor Obama and had heard objections from the community; district officials also cited a policy against naming buildings for living people. By June 2015, officials were referring to the proposal as Near North High School and the Public Building Commission of Chicago was evaluating four possible sites after the original location was dismissed.

In October 2016, the project was postponed indefinitely as tax-increment-financing resources were redirected to Chicago Public Schools following an agreement that averted a teachers' strike. The proposal was still without a permanent site at the time.
