= Law of equal liberty =

Fundamental precept of liberalism and socialism

The law of equal liberty is the fundamental precept of liberalism and socialism. Stated in various ways by many thinkers, it can be summarized as the view that all individuals must be granted the maximum possible freedom as long as that freedom does not interfere with the freedom of anyone else. While socialists have been hostile to liberalism, which is accused of "providing an ideological cover for the depredation of capitalism", scholars have stated that "the goals of liberalism are not so different from those of the socialists", although this similarity in goals has been described as being deceptive due to the different meanings liberalism and socialism give to liberty, equality and solidarity, including the meaning, implications and norms of equal liberty derived from it.

== Definition ==
In his Second Treatise of Government (1689), John Locke wrote: "A state also of equality, wherein all the power and jurisdiction is reciprocal, no one having more than another; there being nothing more evident, than that creatures of the same species and rank, promiscuously born to all the same advantages of nature, and the use of the same faculties, should also be equal one amongst another without subordination or subjection, unless the lord and master of them all should, by any manifest declaration of his will, set one above another, and confer on him, by an evident and clear appointment, an undoubted right to dominion and sovereignty."

In "A Full Vindication of the Measures of the Congress", written in 1774, Alexander Hamilton wrote: "All men have one common original, they participate in one common nature, and consequently have one common right. No reason can be assigned why one man should exercise any power over his fellow creatures more than another, unless they voluntarily vest him with it." In Social Statics (1851), Herbert Spencer defined it as a natural law "that every man may claim the fullest liberty to exercise his faculties compatible with the possession of like liberty to every other man." Stated another way by Spencer, "each has freedom to do all that he wills provided that he infringes not the equal freedom of any other." American individualist anarchist and libertarian socialist Benjamin Tucker defined equal liberty as "the largest amount of liberty compatible with equality and mutuality of respect, on the part of individual's living in society, for their respective spheres of action."

== Proponents and views ==
=== Georgism ===
==== Equal right of land ====
In 1775, Thomas Spence published a pamphlet titled Rights of Man based on the law of equal liberty and stressed the equal right to land. According to Spence, we have equal rights to land as we have equal rights to life and liberty. To deny to some people this right "is in effect denying them a right to live. For the right to deprive anything of the means of living, supposes a right to deprive it of life."

In 1795, Thomas Paine wrote Agrarian Justice, stating: "Liberty and property are words that express every thing we possess that is not of an intellectual quality. Property is of two kinds. First, natural property, or that which is of the Creator's making, as Earth, Air, and Water. Secondly, artificial or acquired property, or that which is of man’s making or producing. Of this there can be no equality, because, in order to participate equally, it is first necessary that every man produces it equally, which is never the case; and if it were every man keeping his own, would be the same as participation. The equality of natural property is the subject treated of in this work. Every person born into the world is born the rightful proprietor of a certain species of property, or the value thereof."

In Social Statics, Herbert Spencer based his political philosophy on the law of equal liberty. He pointed out that denying an equal right to use land could result in non landers being evicted from the planet and contradicts the law of equal freedom. This point was made further by land reformists especially championed by Henry George in Progress and Poverty, where he sought to address this by preferably taxing land values. George disagreed with Spencer that the equal right to use land implied that land should be nationalized. George criticized Spencer's lack of adherence to his own conclusions in A Perplexed Philosopher and stated that equal right to use land does not imply the joint-ownership of land, therefore all that is necessary to achieve the law of equal freedom was to tax land with a land value tax which would disincentivise landbanking.

=== Socialism ===
==== Equal liberty ====
Anarchism and socialism's idea of equal liberty rests on political, social and economic equality of opportunity. Saul Newman's equal liberty is "'the idea that liberty and equality are inextricably linked, that one cannot be had without the other'. They both belong to the category of emancipation, they mutually resonate, and they are situated in a collective context. Equality does not come secondary to liberty, as usually happens under the liberal reading; the demand for it goes beyond the formal equality of rights and there is no tension between the two, no separation and conflict between individuals as passive recipients within society. Liberty is collective, as is its realization, being shared instead of diminished and being 'only imaginable in the contest of the liberty of all', and accompanied also by social and economic equality. The principle of equal-liberty is an 'open-ended horizon that allows for endless permutations and elaborations. Moreover, it is closer to anarchist political ethics: transcending the socialist as well as the liberal tradition, it entails that liberty and equality cannot be implemented within the state, and it interrogates all forms of domination and hierarchy."

Mikhail Bakunin, who famously proclaimed that "[w]e are convinced that freedom without Socialism is privilege and injustice, and that Socialism without Freedom is slavery and brutality", stated that "I am truly free only when all human beings, men and women, are equally free. The freedom of other men, far from negating or limiting my freedom, is, on the contrary, its necessary premise and confirmation." Benjamin Tucker's notion of equal liberty implies that "each person is equally free to pursue his or her self-interest, and is bound only by 'a mutuality of respect.'" Tucker stated that this is a contract or social convention rather than a natural right, writing: "Now equal liberty itself being a social convention (for there are no natural rights), it is obvious that anarchism recognizes the property of compelling individuals to regard one social convention. But it does not follow from this that it recognizes the propriety of compelling individuals to regard any and all social convention. Anarchism protects equal liberty (of which property based on labor is simply an expression in a particular sphere), not because it is a social convention, but because it is equal liberty, that is, because it is anarchism itself." Tucker stated that equal liberty should be protected through voluntary association rather than through government because the latter is the negation of equal liberty.

According to John F. Welsh, equal liberty is "an absolute or first principle for Tucker since it appears as a core concept in all of his writing. He makes it abundantly clear that equal liberty is inextricably tied to his notions of both anarchism and self-ownership. Tucker equates equal liberty with anarchism." Although claiming that equal liberty is a social construction rather than a natural right, Tucker "infuses the notion with the rhetoric of rights, including the concepts of duty and compulsion." For Tucker, people have "a duty to respect each other's rights, assuming the word 'right' to be used in the sense of the limit which the principle of equal liberty logically places upon might", referencing Max Stirner's egoist anarchism. In addition, "man's only duty is to respect others' 'rights'" and that "man's only right over others is to enforce that duty." Welsh states that Tucker based his notions of equal liberty on "the distinction between invasion and resistance, between government and defense." Tucker used the term invasion to refer to the "line inside of which liberty of action", i.e. positive liberty, "does not conflict with others' liberty of action."

For Paul Eltzbacher, people have the right to resist invasion and defend or protect their personal liberty. Eltzbacher wrote that "[t]he individual has the right to repel invasion of his sphere of action." According to Welsh, Tucker proposed that "the law of equal liberty be given some teeth through the creation of 'defensive associations' that would act coercively on behalf of the anarchistic principle of equal liberty, prohibiting and demanding redress for invasive acts." Richard P. Hiskes states in Community Without Coercion: Getting Along in the Minimal State that "the criticism of individualism for its alleged lack of communal sentiment is false: individualism as a means of political organization is capable of preserving individual liberty and providing for the welfare of all persons in society."

== See also ==
- Egalitarianism
- Equality before the law
- Harm principle
- Left-libertarianism
- Left-wing politics
- Libertarianism
- Libertarian socialism
- Lockean proviso
- Non-aggression principle
- Georgism
- Geolibertarianism
- Mutualism (economic theory)
- Right-libertarianism

== Bibliography ==
- Hiskes, Richard P. (1982). Community Without Coercion: Getting Along in the Minimal State. Newark: University of Delaware Press. ISBN 9780874131789.
- Sprading, Charles (2015). Liberty and the Great Libertarians (illustrated ed.). Auburn: Mises Institute. ISBN 9781610161077.
- Welsh, John F. (2010). Max Stirner's Dialectical Egoism: A New Interpretation (illustrated ed.). Lanham: Rowman & Littlefield. ISBN 9780739141564.
