= Peter Barnes (entrepreneur) =

American businessman

- Born: April 16, 1942 (age 84); New York City, New York, US
- Occupations: Entrepreneur, writer, environmentalist

Peter Barnes (born April 16, 1940, in New York City) is an American entrepreneur, environmentalist, and journalist.

== Early life and education ==
Barnes grew up in New York City. He earned a B.A. in history from Harvard University and an M.A. in government from Georgetown.

== Career ==
=== Journalist ===
Barnes began his career in journalism working as a reporter for The Lowell Sun in Lowell, Massachusetts. He later became a Washington, D.C. correspondent for Newsweek and was subsequently employed as a west coast correspondent for The New Republic.

=== Entrepreneur ===
In 1976, Barnes co-founded a worker-owned solar energy company in San Francisco, California. In 1983, he co-founded Working Assets Money Fund. In November 1985, Working Assets became a mobile telephone company, later re-branded as Credo.

He served as president of Working Assets Long Distance in the 1980s. In 1995, Barnes was named Socially Responsible Entrepreneur of the Year for Northern California.

=== Board membership ===
Barnes served on numerous boards of directors, including:

- National Cooperative Bank
- California Solar Industry Association, Businesses for Social Responsibility
- Rainbow Workers Cooperative
- Redefining Progress
- Greenpeace International
- Center for Economic and Policy Research
- Earth, Inc.

== Environmentalism ==
Barnes is an ardent environmentalist and an outspoken advocate of the need to reduce carbon emissions. He originated the terms "Capitalism 3.0" and "Sky Trust". These terms describe his proposal for a "cap and dividend" program modeled on the Alaska Permanent Fund, which Barnes maintains will reduce greenhouse emissions and create a citizens dividend for all Americans. Barnes contends that his proposals are more workable and sustainable than that of the cap-and-trade policies of the Kyoto Protocol.

=== Sky Trust proposal ===
Barnes' Sky Trust proposal is based on the idea that each and every American owns the sky as if it were a common asset. Barnes has stated the goal of Sky Trust would be to "promote climate stability by: limiting the amount of carbon that can be put into the atmosphere; allowing the free market to set a price on the right to emit carbon; collecting revenue from those who buy those rights; and returning earned revenue to the owners of the sky."

The Sky Trust was originally proposed as a report from the Washington, D.C.–based Common Assets Project of which Barnes is the founder. The idea behind the proposal was originally inspired by the Alaska Permanent Fund; a fund that pays dividends to residents of Alaska, derived from what is essentially natural resource rent.

The "trust" Barnes hopes to create is more than an idea, but an actual legal entity. The trust's mission is multi-pronged:

- "to preserve the current mix of the gases in the sky, thereby stabilizing the climate;
- to receive market prices for the use of the sky as a dump; and
- to distribute income among the beneficiaries equally."

Every American citizen including children would be the beneficiaries of such a program, receiving a lump sum. This would aim to help to ease problems such as poverty and wealth inequality by giving children, including those born into poverty, some basic inheritance property rights.

Some criticisms of the Sky Trust include: the charge that the revenue earned by the Sky Trust could be better allocated by subsidizing clean energy prices, and that the Sky Trust would need to be a global initiative to have an environmental as well as social impact on the planet. If the Sky Trust weren't global, corporations could theoretically move to another country that wouldn't tax the "use of the sky as a dump".

=== Cap and Dividend ===
"Sky Trust" was rebranded as "Cap and Dividend" in advance of the 2008 elections in order to raise its profile. Barnes conducted numerous interviews explaining and popularizing the idea.

== Publications ==
- Pawns; the plight of the citizen-soldier. Knopf. 1972. ISBN 978-0-394-43616-6.
- The people's land: A reader on land reform in the United States. Rodale Press. 1975. ISBN 978-0-87857-091-1.
- Who Owns the Sky?: Our Common Assets And The Future Of Capitalism. Island Press. 2003. ISBN 978-1-55963-855-5.
- Capitalism 3.0: A Guide to Reclaiming the Commons. Berrett-Koehler Publishers. 2006. ISBN 978-1-57675-361-3.
- Climate Solutions: A Citizen's Guide. Chelsea Green Publishing. 2008. ISBN 978-1-60358-005-2.
- With Liberty and Dividends for All: How to Save Our Middle-Class When Jobs Don’t Pay Enough (2014)

== See also ==
- Politics of global warming
