= Geolibertarianism =

Political and economic ideology integrating libertarianism with Georgism

Geolibertarianism is a political and economic ideology that integrates libertarianism with Georgism. It favors a taxation system based (as in Georgism) on income derived from land and natural resources instead of on labor, coupled with a minimalist model of government, as in libertarianism. The term was coined by the late economist Fred Foldvary in 1981.

Geolibertarians recognize the right to private ownership of land, but only if fair recompense is paid to the community for the loss of access to that land. Some geolibertarians broaden out the tax base to include resource depletion, environmental damage, and other ancillaries to land use.

A succinct summary of this philosophy can be found in Thomas Paine's 1797 pamphlet Agrarian Justice: "Men did not make the earth. It is the value of the improvements only, and not the earth itself, that is individual property. Every proprietor owes to the community a ground rent for the land which he holds".

== Overview ==
Geolibertarians maintain that geographical space and raw natural resources—any assets that qualify as land by economic definition—are rivalrous goods to be considered common property, or more accurately unowned, which all individuals share an equal human right to access, not capital wealth to be privatized fully and absolutely. Therefore, landholders ought to pay compensation according to the rental value set by the free market, absent any improvements, to the community for the civil right of usufruct (that is, legally recognized exclusive possession with restrictions on property abuse) or otherwise fee simple title with no such restrictions. Ideally, the taxing of a site would be administered only after it has been determined that the privately captured economic rent from the land exceeds the title-holder's equal share of total land value in the jurisdiction.

On this proposal, rent is collected not for the mere occupancy or use of land, as neither the community nor the state rightfully owns the commons, but rather as an objectively assessed indemnity due for the legal right to exclude others from that land. Some geolibertarians also support Pigovian taxes on pollution and severance taxes to regulate natural resource depletion and compensatory fees with ancillary positive environmental effects on activities which negatively impact land values. Geolibertarinism takes the standard right-libertarian position that each individual is naturally entitled to the fruits of their labor as exclusive private property as opposed to produced goods being owned collectively by society or by the government acting to represent society, and that a person's "labor, wages, and the products of labor" should not be taxed. Along with non-Georgists in the libertarian movement, they also advocate the law of equal liberty, supporting "full civil liberties, with no crimes unless there are victims who have been invaded."

Geolibertarians are generally influenced by the Georgist single tax movement of the late-19th and early-20th centuries, but the ideas behind it pre-date Henry George and can be found in different forms in the political writings of John Locke, the early agrarian socialism of English True Levellers or Diggers such as Gerrard Winstanley, the French Physiocrats (especially Quesnay and Turgot), British classical economists Adam Smith and David Ricardo, French liberal economists Jean-Baptiste Say and Frédéric Bastiat, American Revolutionary writers Thomas Jefferson and Thomas Paine, English Radical land reformer Thomas Spence, American individualist anarchists Lysander Spooner and Benjamin Tucker, as well as British classical liberal philosophers John Stuart Mill and Herbert Spencer. Geolibertarians have also included Old Right social critics Albert Jay Nock and Frank Chodorov. Other thinkers who have expressed support for the land value tax as an incremental reform include Milton Friedman, Karl Hess, John Hospers and United States Libertarian Party co-founder David Nolan.

== Property rights ==
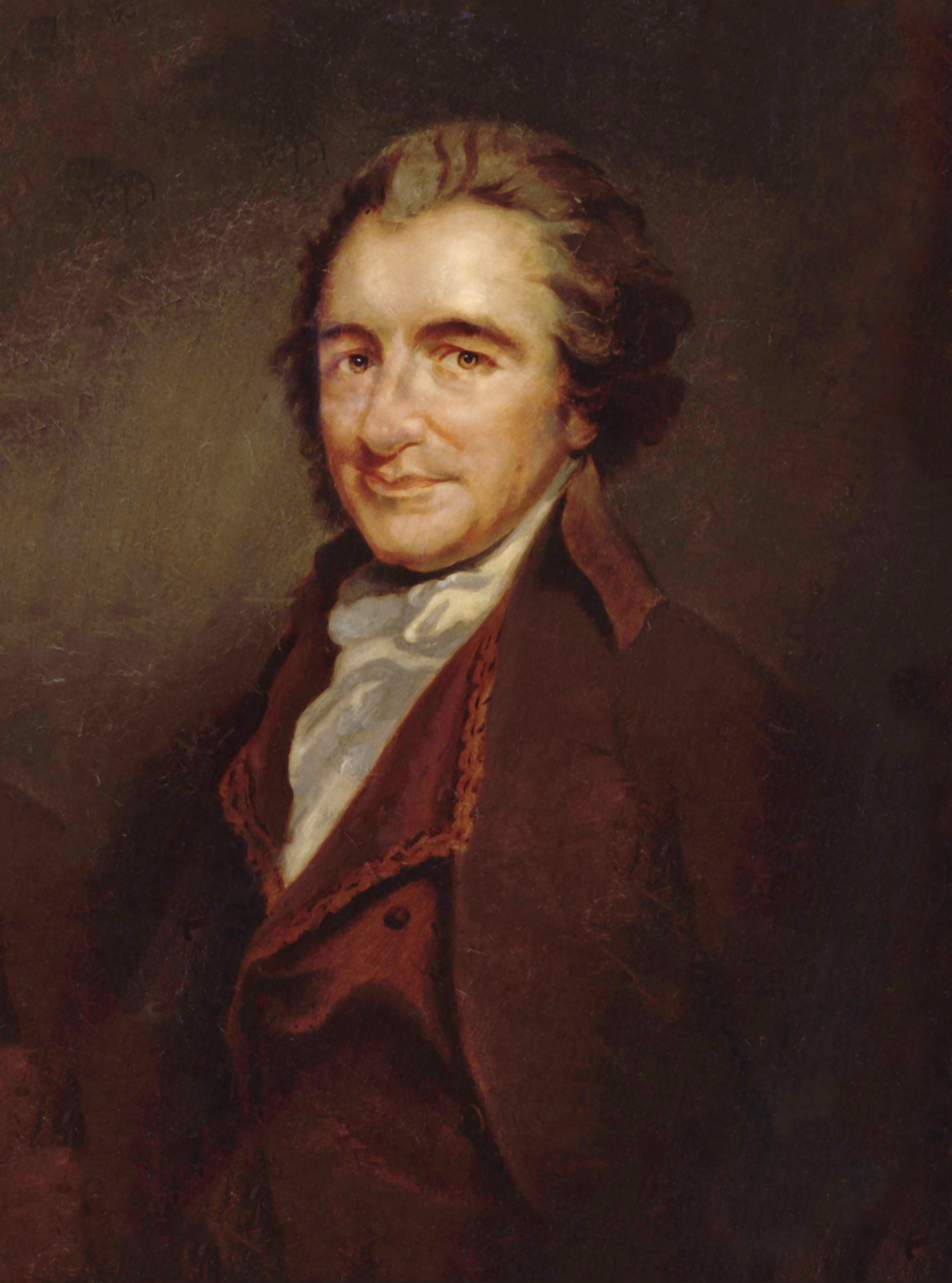
Thomas Paine inspired the citizen's dividend and stated: "Every proprietor owes to the community a ground rent for the land which he holds."

In continuity with the classical economic and liberal traditions, geolibertarians contend that land is an independent factor of production, that it is the common inheritance of all humanity and that the justice of private property is derived from an individual's right to the fruits of their labor. Since land by economic definition is not the product of human labor, its ownership cannot be justified by appealing to natural human rights. Geolibertarians recognize the individual civil right to secure exclusive possession of land only on the condition that if the land has accrued economic rent, its full rental value be paid to the community deprived of equal access. This non-distortionary system of taxation, it is argued, has the effects of returning the value that belongs to all members of society and encouraging landholders to use only as much land as they need, leaving unneeded land for others to occupy, use and develop.

A succinct summary of the geolibertarian philosophy is Thomas Paine's assertion in his 1797 pamphlet Agrarian Justice: "Men did not make the earth. It is the value of the improvements only, and not the earth itself, that is individual property. Every proprietor owes to the community a ground rent for the land which he holds". On the other hand, John Locke wrote that private land ownership should be praised as long as its product was not left to spoil and there was "enough, and as good left in common for others". When this Lockean proviso is violated, the land earns rental value. Some geolibertarians argue that "enough, and as good left" is a practical impossibility in a city setting where location is paramount. This implies that in any urban social environment Locke's proviso requires the collection and equal distribution of ground rent. Geolibertarians sometimes dispute the received interpretation of Locke's homestead principle outlined in his Second Treatise of Government as concerning the justice of initial acquisition of property in land, opting instead for a view ostensibly more compatible with the proviso which considers Locke to be describing the process by which property is created from land through the application of labor.

This strict definition of private property as the fruit of a person's labor leads geolibertarians to advocate free markets in capital goods, consumer goods, and services, in addition to the protection of workers' rights to their full earnings.

== Policy proposals ==
Geolibertarians generally support allocating land rent from private landholders to all community members by way of a land value tax as proposed by Henry George and others before him.

Geolibertarians desire to see the revenue from land value capture cover only necessary administrative costs and fund only those public services which are essential for a governing body to secure and enforce rights to life, liberty and estate—civic protections which increase the aggregate land rent within the jurisdiction and thereby serve to finance themselves—the surplus being equally distributed as an unconditional dividend to each citizen. Thus, the value of the land is returned to the residents who produce it, but who by practical necessity and legal privilege have been deprived of equal access while the poor and disadvantaged benefit from a reliable social safety net unencumbered by bureaucracy or intrusive means-testing. Some geolibertarians claim the reasoning behind taxing land values likewise justifies a complementary pollution tax for degrading the shared value of the natural commons. The common and inelastic character of the radio wave spectrum (which also falls under land as an economic category) is understood to justify the taxation of its exclusive use, as well.

American economist and political philosopher Fred Foldvary coined the term geo-libertarianism in a so-titled article appearing in Land&Liberty. In the case of what Foldvary terms "geoanarchism", which he describes as the most radically decentralized and scrupulously voluntarist form of geolibertarianism, Foldvary theorizes that ground rents would be collected by private agencies and persons would have the opportunity to secede from associated geocommunities—thereby opting out of their protective and legal services—if desired.

== See also ==
- Citizen's dividend
- Classical economics
- Classical liberalism
- Commons
- Free-market environmentalism
- Freiwirtschaft
- Georgism
- Green libertarianism
- Jeffersonian democracy
- Land law
- Land value tax
- Minarchism
- Natural and legal rights
- Neoclassical liberalism
- Poverty reduction
- Radical centrism
- Single tax
- Sustainable development
- Tax shift
- Tragedy of the anticommons
- Value capture
