= Citizen's dividend =

Georgist proposed policy

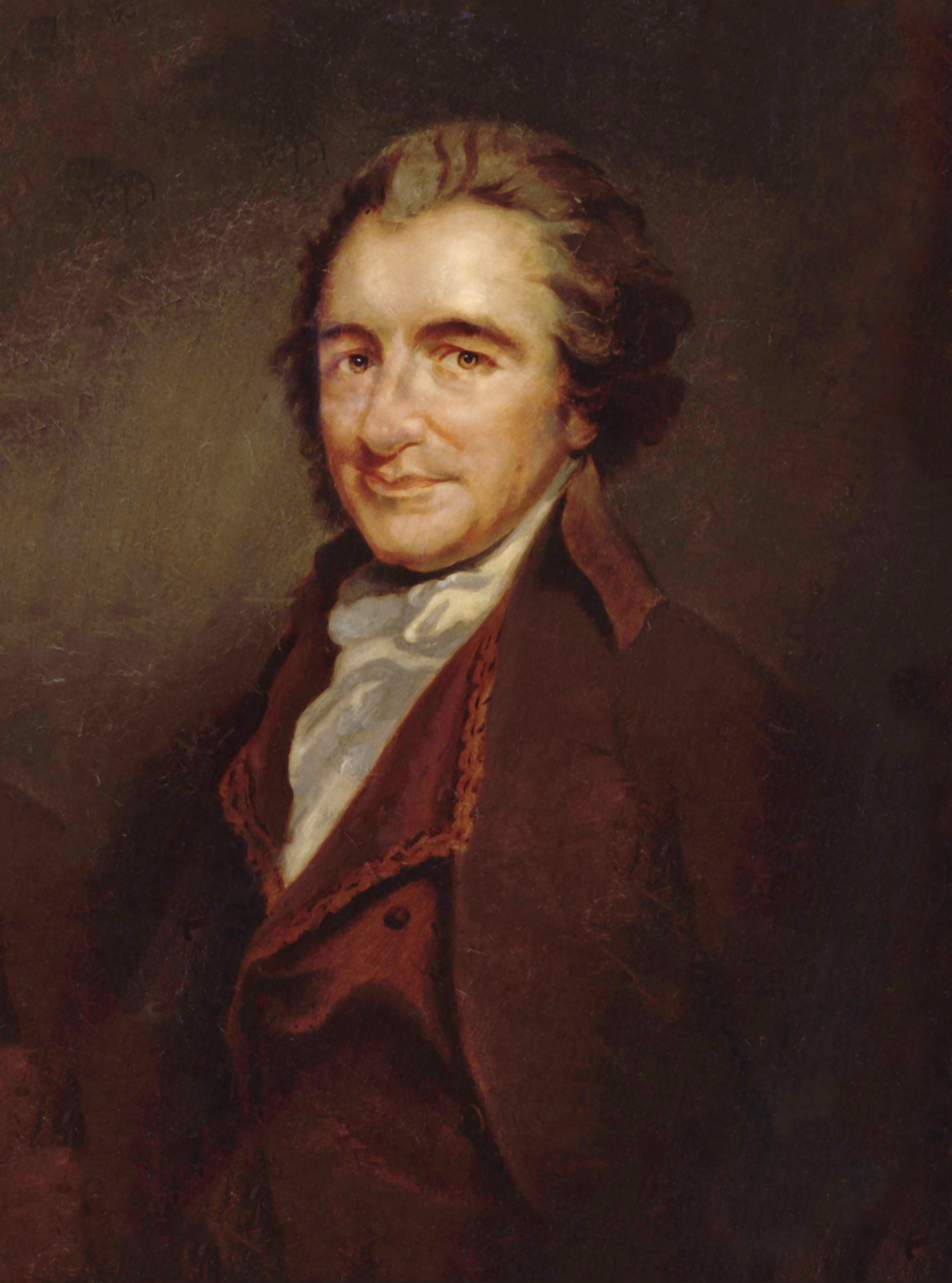
Thomas Paine (1737–1809) was a major inspiration for the policy.

Citizen's dividend (CD) is a proposed policy based upon the Georgist principle that the natural world is the common property of all people. It is proposed that all citizens receive regular payments (dividends) from revenue raised by leasing or taxing the monopoly of valuable land and other natural resources.

== History ==
A concept akin to a citizen's dividend was known in Classical Athens. In 483 BC, a massive new seam of silver was found in the Athenian silver mines at Laurium. The dispersal of this provoked great debate. The statesman Aristides proposed the profit from this should be distributed among the Athenian citizens. However he was opposed by Themistocles, who proposed the money be spent building warships for the Athenian navy. In the end, Themistocles' policy was the one adopted.

In the United Kingdom and United States, the idea can be traced back to Thomas Paine's essay, Agrarian Justice, which is also considered one of the earliest proposals for a social security system. Thomas Paine summarized his view by stating that "Men did not make the earth. It is the value of the improvements only, and not the earth itself, that is individual property. Every proprietor owes to the community a ground rent for the land which he holds." Paine saw inheritance as being partly a common fund and wanted to supplement the citizen's dividend in a tax on inheritance transfers, but Georgist supporters now focus on natural resources.

== Implementations and proposals ==
This concept is a form of universal basic income (UBI), where the citizen's dividend depends upon the value of natural resources or what could be titled as common goods like location values, seignorage, the electromagnetic spectrum, the industrial use of air (CO_{2} production), etc.

=== Permanent Fund Dividend implementation in Alaska ===
The U.S. state of Alaska dispenses a form of citizen's dividend in its Permanent Fund dividend, which holds investments initially seeded by the state's revenue from mineral resources, particularly petroleum. In 2005, every eligible Alaskan resident (including children) received a check for $845.76. Over the 24-year history of the fund, it has paid out a total of $24,775.45 to every resident. Some believe this dividend as the reason why Alaska has one of the lowest rates of inequality and relatively low levels of poverty compared to other US states. A 2018 paper found that the Alaska Permanent Fund "dividend had no effect on employment, and increased part-time work by 1.8 percentage points (17 percent)... our results suggest that a universal and permanent cash transfer does not significantly decrease aggregate employment."

=== Carbon emissions reduction proposal ===
The concept is also promoted as a tool to reduce carbon emissions. Peter Barnes created the concept of "Sky Trust" as an example of how this could be implemented. Barnes proposes setting up a public trust to manage the funds, separate from the private sector being taxed. A calculation based on specific assets by Barnes estimates that American citizens could each get $5,000 per year by this model.

=== Swiss experiment proposal ===
A Swiss campaign in 2013 advocated for a citizen's income which could net each citizen an amount equivalent to $34,000. A citizens dividend based on resources according to Thomas Pogge is due to every citizen because everyone owns an inalienable stake in all limited natural resources. His theory goes along with Barnes with the exception of ownership, Pogge contends that the people own the resources. The Progress Report says that the dividend should be valued by the free market.

=== Maryland proposal ===
John Moser, a 2018 congressional candidate in Maryland, ran chiefly on the proposal that a citizen's dividend based around a portion of all income would eliminate homelessness and hunger, and would act as a collective risk share as used in Nordic model nations.

=== New Physiocratic League ===
The New Physiocratic League, a project advocating for an economic reform revolving around shifting taxation towards land, advocates for a form of citizen's dividend as part of its Three Pillars program of income support.

=== Citizen's dividend proposal in India ===
Rahul Chimanbhai Mehta, an Indian politician, has proposed a form of citizen's dividend. In his system, two-thirds of the royalty payments from mining and wireless spectrum, as well as the rent collected from some public land would be dispensed as monthly payments to all Indians above the age of seven. The remaining third would be allocated for the military. His proposal allocates less funds for parents who have more than four children and for legal minors but more funds for senior citizens. According to his estimate, this can result in a monthly income of approximately Rs. 1000 for every Indian.

=== Other proposals ===
Several philosophers and economists connect left-libertarian ideas with support for UBI. Of these, the most closely related theory to Georgism calls for a citizen's dividend—that is, a UBI equal to the monetary rental value of natural resources and socially created wealth. Writers advocating citizen's dividends include Peter Barnes (author of With Liberty and Dividends for All), economist Nic Tideman and activist Jeff Smith. Barnes proposes setting up a public "Sky Trust" to manage the funds creating from taxing pollution, greenhouse gases and other actions that deplete the value of shared natural resources.

Other theorists use left-libertarian insights without strictly connecting the monetary value of resource value with the level of UBI. Philippe Van Parijs makes a freedom-based argument for the highest sustainable UBI regardless of the value of natural resources, justified partly on the basis that the labor market is imperfectly competitive and produces a significant amount of "job rents." Guy Standing uses many left-libertarian or "[Thomas] Painist" arguments for UBI, along with progressive and social-democratic arguments for UBI without committing to resource- or rent-based financing of UBI.

To reduce economic inequality to levels he considers more advantageous, Steven Pearlstein proposes a $3000 per year dividend for Americans completing K-12 education, with a requirement to at some point perform three years of public service (or, alternatively, profit sharing).

== See also ==
- Asset-based egalitarianism (basic capital)
- Carbon fee and dividend
- Common good
- Common land
- Common ownership
- Geolibertarianism
- Global resources dividend
- Land value tax
- Property-owning democracy
- Prosperity Bonus
- Public land
- Public property
- Redistribution of income and wealth
- Resource nationalism
- Social ownership
- Sovereign wealth fund
- State ownership
