= Cap and dividend =

Cap and dividend is a market-based trading system which retains the original capping method of cap and trade, but also includes compensation for energy consumers. This compensation is to offset the cost of products produced by companies that raise prices to consumers as a result of this policy.

The process begins with some governments setting aggregate pollution quotas (e.g., for carbon emissions) and selling pollution permits to the public respectively. Polluters are required to buy those credits to match their pollution outputs. Some of the cost producers pay for pollution will result in higher costs for consumers, who as citizens are additionally faced with the environmental costs of the pollution. Under the cap and dividend system, public revenues raised from the sale of pollution credits is rebated to citizens or to consumers as a subsidy for increasing efficiency.

== Overview ==
The goal of this type of pseudo-tax is to reduce carbon emission rates. This is similar to the cap-and-trade system, with the main difference being that citizens receive dividend payments financed from pollution rents that are publicly captured, as opposed to leaving the value of pollution privileges to become financialized as private assets. The dividend payments can also finance the addition of incentives designed to encourage consumers to increase energy efficiency, whereas cap-and-trade does not directly involve the consumer. The Healthy Climate Trust Fund is the agency in the U.S. government who are overseeing the cap-and-dividend policy. They will accomplish this by collecting and distributing the funds from the capping process.

== Definitions ==
Provided are convenient definitions pertaining to cap-and-dividend:

- Cap-and-Dividend:
  Cap-and-dividend is an approach to reducing greenhouse gas (GHG) emissions. The concept is simple: a limit or cap is placed on greenhouse gases from certain sources; these sources are required to obtain permits to cover their greenhouse gas emissions and dividends from the sale of the permits are returned directly to consumers through rebates or tax credits to compensate for increased energy costs. The cap is typically placed on 'upstream' sources – like fossil fuel suppliers – to cover the carbon content of the fuels they distribute. Some limited trading may be allowed, but typically only among covered sources.

For definitions on Cap-and-Trade, see emissions trading

== History ==
The idea was first proposed by American entrepreneur Peter Barnes under the name "Skytrust" in his 2001 book, Who Owns the Sky?. The name was changed in advance of the 2008 elections by Barnes as he began an effort to raise the profile of the idea with a new book, Climate Solutions: A Citizens Guide and numerous media interviews. He was supported in his work by such groups as On the Commons, a network group which promotes environmental, community-related solutions. The policy was vigorously debated with Joe Romm calling it "fatally incomplete" and Time magazine hailing it as a way to "Win the War on Global Warming".

=== Creation ===
The idea was conceived of and first popularized by American entrepreneur Peter Barnes and such groups as On the Commons, a network group which promotes environmental, community-related solutions.

=== Van Hollen Cap and Dividend Bill, 2009 ===
Chris Van Hollen (D-Md.) put a bill before Congress on April 1, 2009, pertaining to carbon reductions and including the cap and dividend system. The cosponsors of the bill were Rep Earl Blumenauer [OR-3], Rep Lloyd Doggett [TX-25], Rep Mike Thompson [CA-1], Rep Lynn C. Woolsey [CA-6].

The goals of the Cap and Dividend Act of 2009 are as follows:

- Set robust, scientifically driven emissions reductions targets at 25 percent below 2005 levels by 2020 and 85 percent below 2005 levels by 2050 for covered emissions.
- Place an upstream compliance obligation on the first seller of fossil fuels into the U.S. market.
- Auction 100 percent of carbon permits.
- Include Border Adjustment provisions to protect U.S. manufacturers of carbon-intensive goods from imports of carbon-intensive goods originating in countries without comparable climate legislation and assistance for U.S. exporters of carbon-intensive goods to compete effectively in the international marketplace with carbon-intensive goods originating in countries without comparable climate legislation.
- Return 100% of auction proceeds in the form of a monthly Consumer Dividend to every lawful resident of the United States with a valid Social Security number.

This bill looked to create the Healthy Climate Trust Fund, the potential agency for managing and distributing dividend funds.

The status of the bill included a referral to House Ways and Means Committee on April 1, 2009, then a referral to House Energy and Commerce Committee also on April 1, 2009, and then on April 2, 2009 a referral to the United States House Energy Subcommittee on Energy and Environment. The bill was reviewed by the United States House Energy Subcommittee on Energy and Environment but it didn't pass as an act.

=== Van Hollen Healthy Climate and Family Security Bill, 2015 ===
Congressman Van Hollen again tried to introduce a Cap and Dividend bill in July 2014, but it did not pass as an act.

=== GOP elder statesmen call on Trump, 2017 ===
Several elder statesmen of the Grand Old Party (GOP), namely former Secretaries of State James Baker and George Shultz and former Treasury Secretary Hank Paulson, co-authored a report with Ted Halstead of Climate Leadership Council; and economists Martin Feldstein and Greg Mankiw; calling upon President Trump to introduce cap and dividend. Mankiw was interviewed about the use of a carbon tax in the 2016 Leonardo DiCaprio documentary Before the Flood.

== Economy ==
Cap and dividend, like cap and trade, would have had a direct impact on the economy. With a policy like this it will affect not only the major companies that will be taxed but also every household through a chain reaction of product price increases. There will be variations on how much of an impact this policy would have on different geographical areas based on population and how industrialized the area is.

=== Effect on companies ===
Caps will be placed on carbon emissions and every company that use carbon-based fuel to produce some sort of product will have to buy carbon permits. In the cap and dividend policy, every company will have to buy a carbon permit and this differs from the cap and trade policy because there will be no permits given away for free. The permits, collected by the government, will then be used to account for the dividends given back to the people. However, because of the permits' cost, the companies will be forced to raise the prices of their products so they can still make profit. The price increase will be felt by all customers of these various products.

=== Effect on households ===
The cost of everything made using carbon-based fuels will increase and will be felt by everyone. However, the people most affected by the price increases are the people emitting more carbon. For example: Someone that drives a Hummer is going to have to buy more gas, which the price is increased as well, than a family that drives a fuel-efficient car. Every month the government will automatically send a dividend to offset the cost of the high prices. Rayyane El Khourassani, founder and CEO of the rational project, developed mathematical models to see which households should experience a net financial gain or loss in these situations depending on the household's carbon footprint. The people that conserve the most and produced the least amount of carbon emissions will get a bigger dividend than a person who has been producing a large amount of carbon emissions.

== Comparison to cap and dividend and other Policies ==
There have been numerous ideas and attempts to reduce the amount of carbon emissions. Policies have been proposed and rejected. One of the policies that has been actually used is known as the cap and trade system. It is currently being used in Europe and has influenced the people living there.

There are several differences between cap and trade and cap and dividend that ultimately define each of them. A cap is placed on carbon emissions and green house gas (GHG) emissions in both policies. Based on the caps there are carbon emission permits that give the companies the ability to produce more carbon emissions then the cap would permit. These permits are auctioned off to different companies. In the cap and trade system only a set amount are auctioned off and the rest are given away for free. In the cap and dividend system all the permits are auctioned off. In both systems the cost of buying the permits will increase the price of the product made by the companies; oil, electric, and products that make carbon emissions. The thought process behind this is to dissuade the purchase of mass quantities of these products i.e. less carbon/GHG emissions. While the cap and trade system uses the high prices to control the amount of carbon emissions they do not provide a good incentive to limit carbon emission. Cap and dividend uses the dividends to reward the people that conserve the most. This will benefit the poor the most because of their living situations and this is found to be a problem with many people critiquing the policy.

== See also ==
- Cap and share
- Carbon fee and dividend
- Ecological economics
- Ecotax
- Georgism
- Pigovian tax

== See also ==
- Carbon fee and dividend
