= Special assessment tax =

U.S. tax on real estate for public projects

In the United States, a special assessment is a charge that public authorities can assess against real estate parcels for certain public projects. The concept arose centuries ago as an expression of a maximum from Roman times. In 1851, in the decision of "People v Mayor of City of Brooklyn" (4 N.Y. 419, 425) it was said this way: "It professed to apportion the tax according to the maxim, that 'He who receives the advantage ought to sustain the burthren." Thus, a special assessment provides benefits to some specific real estate rather than all real estate within a community. The financial burden of a special assessment is levied in a specific geographic area known as a special assessment district (SAD). A special assessment may only be levied against parcels of real estate which have been identified as having received a direct and unique "benefit" from the public project.

== Examples ==
The most universally known special assessments are charges levied against lands when drinking water lines are installed; when sewer lines are installed; or when streets are paved with concrete or some other impervious surface. However, special assessment tax levies can be made for other purposes including police or fire protection, parking structures, street lighting and many of the other purposes permitted by state and local government statutes.

While variations of the concept of special assessments have existed in a number of the world's nations since the 1600s, in the US a special assessment is more formally defined through court action as remuneration that a governmental unit may demand from property owners to fund a public project which creates a "benefit" in properties lying within a special geographic area known as a special assessment district.

Some argue this tax has aided the ever-widening gap between the living standards of the rich and poor.

== Special assessment district ==
A special assessment district (S.A.D.) is a geographic area in which the market value of real estate is enhanced due to the influence of a public improvement and in which a tax is apportioned to recover the costs of the public improvement.

Individual special assessment levies may be made only in a S.A.D., which is one of two kinds of geographic areas commonly associated with a special assessment levy.

The other kind of geographic area is the "service district". Circumstances vary according to laws of various states, but the essential distinguishing feature between these two types of districts is this: a service district is composed of all individual parcels of land that are somehow connected to the public improvement for which the special assessment is to be levied. The special assessment district consists of only those properties which are designated by the applicable law as having received a specific and unique "benefit" from the public improvement.

Examples of properties which may be connected in some way to a public improvement and are therefore included within a service district, but may be excluded from the special assessment district are properties associated with a dam and properties associated with a business parking structure.

In the case of a dam ... all properties located within a scientifically defined "watershed" and all properties lying within the floodplain of the dam are connected by how water drains from an entire watershed into a lake and how water within the lake may flood specific areas downstream. Since the area of a watershed and the area of a floodplain are often very, very large when compared to the area of a lake, it is possible for some portions of the watershed and floodplain to be physically located in some government unit other than the lake. It is also possible that the government unit authorizing a special assessment levy does not have jurisdiction to include all land within the watershed and floodplain. In this example, the service district would be large enough to include all properties connected to the lake by how water flows. The Special Assessment District would be a smaller area within which the government unit proposing the special assessment has the power to levy a special assessment tax.

In the case of an economic development project (e.g. a parking structure for a business district) circumstances which would cause the service district and S.A.D. to have differing geographic boundaries relates to the existing and permitted use of property rather than political subdivisions. That is, economic forces within the market would be the key to including or excluding a specific property.

The service district for a parking facility is generally limited to the geographic area from which pedestrians would walk between businesses and the parking structure. An example might be that users of a parking structure will traverse an area defined as being within six blocks or less of a parking structure. In this example, the service district would consist of all properties lying within six blocks of the parking structure.

However, there may be more than just retail business structures within the six block area. All classes of properties lying within the distance shoppers can reasonably be expected to walk to and from retail outlets could include a block of homes or an industrial facility. The commercial properties would be assessed because surveys would illustrate that retail sales depend upon adequate parking for customers. It could also be demonstrated that residential properties (homes), would be excluded because users of those properties might not reasonably be expected to "benefit" from the parking structure. Depending upon various scenarios, industrial properties might similarly, not "benefit", from a parking structure.

== Benefit ==
There are variations between state governments as to what constitutes a “benefit” under special assessment laws. A judicial definition of Benefit has been promulgated since the 1800s. However, as experience with special assessments grew, and more and more court decisions were made in various states, a more uniform definition of "Benefit" arose. The contemporary definition of "Benefit" is well expressed in a Supreme Court Decision in the U.S. state of Michigan. That court said: "we clarified the test for determining the validity of special assessments. An earlier Court of Appeals opinion suggested that there were three alternative bases that would support a finding of special benefits sufficient to justify a special assessment: 1) an increase in the land’s value, 2) relief from some burden to the land, or 3) the creation of a special adaptability of the land. Rejecting this approach, this Court said that special assessments are permissible only when the improvements result in an increase in the value of the land specially assessed.” (Kadzban v City of Grandville, 442 Mich 495, 501: 502 N.W.2d 299).

In general, the "benefit" must result directly, uniquely and specifically from the public project. For example, when water and sewer lines are installed by government units, nearby land often increases in value. Both the presence of safe drinking water and of sewer lines means that expensive wells and septic systems do not have to be installed by affected property owners. It also means the potential for contamination of ground water and surface areas from improperly treated sewage will be eliminated. Land that might have been “unbuildable” before may become "buildable" once government provided water and sewer services become available. Providing water and sewer service are situations which may adapt formerly unusable land for residential or commercial use. A storm sewer or a dam or dike may mitigate flooding and therefore the sewer, dike or dam relieves a burden, flooding.

The term benefit most frequently means an increase in the market value of the benefited property. However, some states historically have defined the term benefit to mean more than an increase in market value. For example, benefit may mean a special adaptability of the land or a relief from some burden.

== Tax limited to real property ==
Only certain property can be specially assessed. The "property" to be assessed must be real estate as opposed to "personalty". Personalty is a taxation term which means personal property. Examples of personal property include the machinery, equipment, furniture and fixtures which a person or corporate entity may own.

== Summary of special assessment components ==
In summary, when a government unit funds a public project that directly, uniquely and specifically "benefits" (increases) the value of certain parcels of real estate it may levy a charge against each specifically benefitted property as compensation for the benefit. Properties designated to be specially assessed are assembled into a geographic area with clearly defined boundaries. This geographic area is termed a Special Assessment District.

=== Unique Aspect ===
In some states, sometimes one government unit can levy a special assessment against another. This is true in cases where the public's health, safety and welfare are being promoted by the project (e.g. repairs to a dam). Refer to specific state statutes for details.

=== A special assessment is not an ad valorem property tax ===
The property tax most citizens are aware of is known as an ad valorem tax. This tax is used to fund general or day-to-day government operations. An ad valorem tax is commonly levied on both real and personal property. A property tax is based upon a property's market value. The ad valorem tax levy is based upon a millage rate which never varies from parcel to parcel. The foundation principles for ad valorem taxes are that each property is valued according to its market value (equity) and that each property is taxed based upon a single millage rate that applies to everyone (uniformity).

Special assessment levies are not ad valorem property taxes even though they may be collected on a property tax bill. A special assessment is based strictly upon the concepts of "need" and "benefit." Special assessments require a finding that the public improvement is "needed" for a reason consistent with the law which permits the special assessment and that each property specially assessed receives a unique, measurable and direct benefit from the public improvement that was needed. The basic idea is, if government funds make a property more valuable, the government has the right to get money back from a property owner. This contrasts significantly with an ad valorem tax which is extracted to fund government operations that are designed to benefit all citizens.

An ad valorem tax is based upon the legal principles of equity and uniformity. That is, everyone must be treated fairly and equally. In special assessments, proportionality is a key element. A special assessment is premised upon the necessity for the public improvement and the fiscal burden imposed must be reasonably proportional to the benefit created. Unlike ad valorem taxes, special assessments are not expected to be uniformly levied (the same millage rate for each parcel). The fiscal burden is spread among only those properties within the special assessment district and it is apportioned to each property based upon the unique, specific and direct benefit the property received from the public improvement. Thus, a vacant lot might be assessed the same fee as an adjacent lot which has a million dollar home on it. For example, both the vacant lot and the property improved with a million dollar home, might be assessed Five Thousand Dollars ($5,000.00) for a sewer connection. So, while both properties have identical $5,000 special assessment obligations because sewer installations have been specially assessed, there will be a huge difference in their ad valorem tax levies; one ad valorem levy will be based upon the value of a vacant lot and the other will be based upon the value of the lot plus the million dollar home.

== Difficulty ==
Among the unique characteristics of the special assessment is one that makes a special assessment particularly onerous for ordinary citizens. A special assessment levy enjoys a legal benefit known as a "presumption of validity." This means that it is much harder and usually, much more expensive to appeal than the ad valorem property tax most citizens are familiar with. This happens because it is difficult for the ordinary citizen to recognize that an error in the special assessment procedure or methodology has occurred and the resources a taxpayer must use to fight a special assessment levy are more expansive and costly than resources to fight an improper ad valorem tax on their real estate.

For example, most property taxpayers intuitively understand market forces associated with the value of their homes or other property. Consequently, if the tax assessment seems out of line, they usually can recognize it quickly. In the case of special assessments, it is difficult for even professionals to grasp the complex nuances associated with the concepts of necessity and benefit which are the foundations of a special assessment levy.

Once a taxpayer has recognized a problem exists, the difference in procedures to appeal a property tax and a special assessment levy makes a special assessment appeal much more difficult. Whereas, ad valorem tax appeals can often be made at a local level without any professional help, special assessment appeals often require the assistance of attorneys, engineers and other consultants. Furthermore, a taxpayer often has the opportunity to protest a property tax assessment annually. In the case of most special assessments, there is usually a very short window of opportunity to appeal and if the window is missed, there can be little recourse available.

Of most importance to any property owner who feels aggrieved by a special assessment levy is a legal concept known as a "presumption of validity". This means courts regard the actions of local government units with deference and the courts presume the government unit did everything correctly. At a minimum, any challenge to the special assessment must show the government did not act lawfully. That challenge is significant.

For all these reasons, it is critical for any person facing a special assessment levy to participate in public hearings and monitor the special assessment process from its earliest stages.

== See also ==
- Value capture
