= Value capture =

Type of public financing

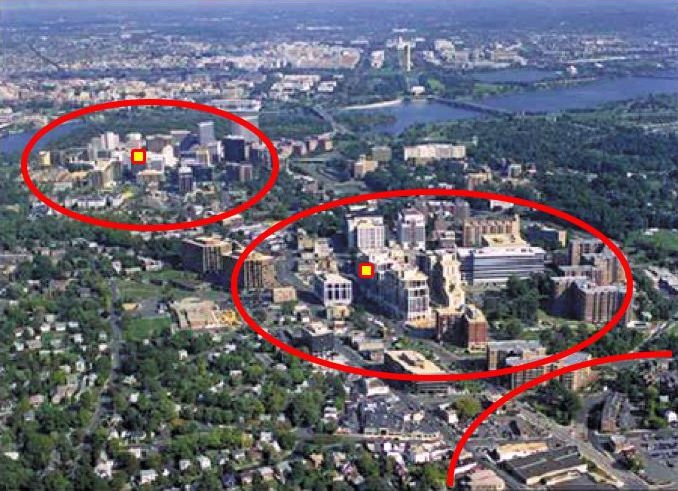
Municipalities have used numerous means to capture unearned land values increased by the addition of public infrastructure. This image shows how building height and density (and therefore value) have increased near rail transit stations.

Value capture is a type of public financing that recovers some or all of the value that public infrastructure generates for private landowners. In many countries, the public sector is responsible for the infrastructure required to support urban development. This infrastructure may include road infrastructure, parks, social, health and educational facilities, social housing, climate adaptation and mitigation tools, and more. Such infrastructure typically requires great financial investment and maintenance, and often the financing of such projects leans heavily on the government bodies themselves.

Public entities, tasked with creating and maintaining this infrastructure, are constantly in search of mechanisms which can allow for fiscal support of these investments. One such mechanism of financing is value capture. Value capture schemes secure and recover a portion of the benefits delivered by public investments, in order to offset the costs of the investment itself. Value capture strategies operate under the assumption that public investment often results in increased valuation of private land and real estate. "Capturing” the subsequent increase in value, governments are able to recuperate funds, which can ultimately be used to generate additional value for communities in the future.

== Description ==
Public investments, such as building transportation or sewer facilities, can increase adjacent land values, generating an unearned profit for private landowners. The unearned value (increases in land value which otherwise profit private landowners cost-free) may be "captured" directly by converting them into public revenue (see georgism). Thus, value capture internalizes the positive externalities of public investments, allowing public agencies to tax the direct beneficiaries of their investments.

Urban planners and finance officials are often interested in value capture mechanisms, for at least two reasons: 1) because they offer a targeted method to finance infrastructure benefiting specific land, and 2) because some such investments can generate private investment in the area, which will more widely benefit the city (e.g., by providing employment opportunities, shopping and other amenities, and a more robust and diverse tax base.) It can be politically useful to capture for the city treasury a share of the positive externalities of city-financed investment. This can help address public concern about the fact or perception of unfair windfalls when specific owners’ land values increase after urban infrastructure investment is paid from general city revenues.

Although it is not always talked about as such, the most common value capture mechanism is the general real property tax, with no special features other than regular assessment of market value; this is because the common real estate tax includes the less known land value tax. The value of any given land is determined by its proximity to various amenities (both public and private). Thus, for example, when a new subway station or highway interchange is installed, land near the new facility becomes more valuable. Investment in capital improvements to land can synergistically generate capital investment in other nearby locations, which further increases land value. Thus, even if the rate of taxation does not change, the tax revenue generated from properties which benefit goes up by way of higher land values and increased development. The effectiveness of value capture depends, of course, on a smoothly functioning ad valorem property or land value tax system, with regularly updated assessments.

== Examples ==
Value capture strategies can be applied to developers or landowners, and they can be applied before or after a public improvement is built. In the case of new public transit facilities, the property value premium nearby can be as high as 167%. Types of value capture include the following:

- Land value tax (LVT)
- Tax increment financing (TIF)
- Special assessment districts or improvement districts
- Infrastructure impact fees (such as traffic or utility fees)
- Joint development
- Air rights
- Exactions, public easements, or other nonpossessory interests

== See also ==
- Externality
- Georgism / Geolibertarianism
- Pigouvian tax
- Property tax
- Wealth tax

== Sources ==
- David M. Levinson and Emilia Istrate. Access for Value: Financing Transportation Through Land Value Capture. Brookings, 2011.
- Financing Transit Systems Through Value Capture: An Annotated Bibliography, Jeffery J. Smith and Thomas A. Gihring in Victoria Transport Policy Institute Encyclopedia, Victoria Canada, Nov. 2004
- Value Capture as a Policy Tool in Transportation Economics, American Journal of Economics and Sociology, Jan, 2001 by H. William Batt
- Developing a Methodology to Capture Land Value Uplift Around Transport Facilities: Executive Summary, for Scottish Executive, October 2004.
- Land Value and Public Transport, Royal Institution of Chartered Surveyors (RICS) and the Office of the Deputy Prime Minister (ODPM), London, Oct. 2002
- Cervero, Robert; Duncan, Michael (2002), "Transit's Value Added Effects: Light and Commuter Rail Services on Commercial Land Values", Transportation Research Record, 1805: 8–15, doi:10.3141/1805-02, S2CID 110180373.
- Challenges in Implementing Colombia's Participación en Plusvalías, Botero, Carolina Barco and Smolka, Martim, March, 2000, Lincoln Institute of Land Policy
- Using Value Capture to Finance Infrastructure and Encourage Compact Development, Rick Rybeck, Public Works Management & Policy Journal, Vol. 8 Number 4, April 2004, (Sage Publications) pp 249 – 260.
