= Tax increment financing =

Public financing method

Tax increment financing (TIF) is a public financing method that is used as a subsidy for redevelopment, infrastructure, and other community-improvement projects in the United States. The original intent of a TIF program is to stimulate private investment in a blighted area that has been designated to be in need of economic revitalization. Similar or related value capture strategies are used around the world.

Through the use of TIF, municipalities typically divert future property tax revenue increases from a defined area or district toward an economic development project or public improvement project in the community. TIF subsidies are not appropriated directly from a city's budget, but the city incurs loss through forgone tax revenue. The first TIF was used in California in 1952. By 2004, all U.S. states excepting Arizona had authorized the use of TIF.

If the cost of basic services increases, with TIF in place, the result is a revenue shortfall that has to be paid from sources other than tax revenues of the TIF district to prevent service cuts.

== Use ==
Tax increment financing subsidies, which are used for both publicly subsidized economic development and municipal projects, have provided the means for cities and counties to gain approval of redevelopment of blighted properties or public projects such as city halls, parks, libraries etc. The definition of blight has taken on a broad inclusion of nearly every type of land including farmland, which has given rise to much of the criticism."

To provide the needed subsidy, the urban renewal district, or TIF district, is often drawn around additional real estate beyond the project site to provide the needed borrowing capacity for the project or projects. The borrowing capacity is established by committing all normal yearly future real estate tax increases from every parcel in the TIF district (for 20–25 years, or more) along with the anticipated new tax revenue eventually coming from the project or projects themselves. If the projects are public improvements paying no real estate taxes, all of the repayment will come from the adjacent properties within the TIF district.

Although questioned, it is often presumed that even public improvements trigger gains in taxes above what would occur in the district without the investment. In many jurisdictions yearly property tax increases are restricted and cannot exceed what would otherwise have occurred.

The completion of a public or private project can at times result in an increase in the value of surrounding real estate, which generates additional tax revenue. Sales-tax revenue may also increase, and jobs may be added, although these factors and their multipliers usually do not influence the structure of TIF.

The routine yearly increases district-wide, along with any increase in site value from the public and private investment, generate an increase in tax revenues. This is the "tax increment". Tax increment financing dedicates tax increments within a certain defined district to finance the debt that is issued to pay for the project. TIF was designed to channel funding toward improvements in distressed, underdeveloped, or underutilized parts of a jurisdiction where development might otherwise not occur. TIF creates funding for public or private projects by borrowing against the future increase in these property-tax revenues.

== History ==
Tax increment financing was first used in California in 1952. There are currently thousands of TIF districts operating in the US, from small and mid-sized cities to large urban areas. As of 2008, California had over four hundred TIF districts with an aggregate of over $10 billion per year in revenues, over $28 billion of long-term debt, and over $674 billion of assessed land valuation. The state of California discontinued the use of TIF financing due to lawsuits in 2011, and enacted the California Fiscal Emergency Proclamation 2010, thereby ending the diversion of property tax revenues from public funding, including the use of TIFs for the funding of the nearly 400 redevelopment agencies in the state. The RDAs appealed that decision, though they were eventually eliminated in February 2012 after the passage of the 2011 state budget.

However, in 2015, the California Community Revitalization and Investment Authority Act was made law, providing for the creation of Community Revitalization and Investment Authorities (CRIAs), funded by Tax-Increment Financing. The primary purposes of CRIAs are the development or preservation of affordable housing for low and moderate income households (a minimum of 25% of TIF funding must be placed in an affordable housing fund) and creation or upgrading of public infrastructure in economically disadvantaged areas as defined under the provisions of the law. Additionally, Enhanced Infrastructure Financing Districts (EIFDs) may be created and financed by TIFs in California.

With the exception of Arizona, every state and the District of Columbia has enabled legislation for tax increment financing (Arizona repealed TIFs in 1999). Some states, such as Illinois, have used TIF for decades, but others have only recently embraced TIF. The state of Maine has a program named TIF; however, this title refers to a process very different than in most states.

Since the 1970s, the following factors have led local governments (cities, townships, etc.) to consider tax increment financing: lobbying by developers, a reduction in federal funding for redevelopment-related activities (including spending increases), restrictions on municipal bonds (which are tax-exempt bonds), the transfer of urban policy to local governments, State-imposed caps on municipal property tax collections, and State-imposed limits on the amounts and types of city expenditures. Considering these factors, many local governments have chosen TIF as a way to strengthen their tax bases, attract private investment, and increase economic activity.

== Urban regeneration ==
In a 2015 literature review on best practices in urban regeneration, cities across the United States are seeking ways to reverse trends of unemployment, declining population and disinvestment in their core downtown areas, as developers continue to expand into suburban areas. Re-investment in downtown core areas include mixed-use development and new or improved transit systems. With successful revitalization comes gentrification with higher property values and taxes, and the exodus of lower income earners.

Successful city revitalization can't be achieved by megaprojects alone—signature buildings, stadiums or other such concentrated development efforts. Instead, "it must be multifaceted and encompass improvements to the cities' physical environments, their economic bases, and the social and economic conditions of their residents.

— Mallach and Brachman 2013

== Unintended consequences ==
Like any economic tool, TIF comes with drawbacks. Organizations such as Municipal Officials for Redevelopment Reform (MORR) use to hold regular conferences on redevelopment abuse, as well as local organizations like Chicago's 33 Ward Working Families.

- As efficient market theory predicts, and now empirical evidence from economic studies suggests, cities that adopt TIF grow more slowly than those that do not. A literature review by David Merriman, a professor at the University of Illinois at Chicago found TIF "may be moving development from one part of the city to another, and changing the timing of the development, but there's not more development than would have otherwise been made."
- TIF increases the property taxes of the areas next to a TIF district by reducing the [Total Taxable Property Value]. Congressman Mike Quigley simplified the math and showed if a [Tax Rate] = [Revenue to be Raised] / [Total Taxable Property Value], then reducing the denominator, [Total Taxable Property Value], increases the [Tax Rate]. A property owner's [Tax Bill] is typically [Tax Rate] x [Assessed Property Value], thus as a new TIF district reduces the [Total Taxable Property], the [Tax Rate] and [Tax Bill] increases for property owners near the TIF district. State Representative Keneth Nordtvedt of Montana paraphrased the scheme this way: "All property taxes—city, county, school, state—are exempted on TIF districts' incremental properties, and then districts put a monetarily equal fee on those properties. Though collected by county treasurer as a tax, that fee is given to TIF district development boards to spend. The adversely affected taxing jurisdictions like school districts, county government, even city government's general fund, are then quietly directed by law to make themselves whole by raising their levies on properties outside of the TIF districts so as to compensate for revenues lost from the TIF district incremental properties."
- As investment in an area increases, it is not uncommon for real estate values to rise and for gentrification to occur.
- Although generally sold to legislatures as a tool to redevelop blighted areas, some districts are drawn up where development would happen anyway, such as ideal development areas at the edges of cities. California has passed legislation designed to curb this abuse.
- The designation of urban areas as "blighted", essential to most TIF implementation, can allow governmental condemnation of property through eminent domain laws. The famous Kelo v. City of New London United States Supreme Court case, where homes were condemned for a private development, arose over actions within a TIF district.
- The TIF process arguably leads to favoritism for politically connected developers, implementing attorneys, economic development officials, and others involved in the processes. However, most Urban Renewal Authorities require public notice and have competitive bidding requirements.
- In some cases, school districts within communities using TIF are experiencing larger increases in state aid than districts not in such communities. This may be creating an incentive for governments to "over-TIF", consequently taking on riskier development projects. Local governments are under no obligation to recognize when TIF designation would adversely affect a school district's financial condition, and consequently the quality of some schools can be compromised.
- Normal inflationary increases in property values can be captured with districts in poorly written TIFs, representing money that would have gone into the public coffers even without the financed improvements.
- Districts can be drawn excessively large thus capturing revenue from areas that would have appreciated in value regardless of TIF designation.
- Approval of districts can sometimes capture one entity's future taxes without its official input, i.e. a school districts taxes will be frozen on action of a city.
- Capturing the full tax increment and directing it to repay the development bonds ignores the fact that the incremental increase in property value likely requires an increase in the provision of public services, which will now have to be funded from elsewhere, often from subsidies from less economically thriving areas. The use of tax increment financing to create a large residential development means that public services from schools to public safety will need to be expanded, yet if the full tax increment is captured to repay the development bonds, other money will have to be used. For example, a study in Saint Louis Missouri found low-income students lost 91 times more than wealthier students in the suburbs due to TIF, and students with disabilities as the second hardest hit group.

== Examples ==
=== Chicago ===
The city of Chicago, in Cook County, Illinois, has a significant number of TIF districts and has become a prime location for examining the benefits and disadvantages of TIF districts. The city runs 131 districts with tax receipts totaling upwards of $500 million for 2006. Lori Healey, appointed commissioner of the city's Planning and Development department in 2005 was instrumental in the process of approving TIF districts as first deputy commissioner.

The Chicago Reader, a Chicago alternative newspaper published weekly, has published articles regarding tax increment financing districts in and around Chicago. Written by staff writer Ben Joravsky, the articles are critical of tax increment financing districts as implemented in Chicago.

Cook County Clerk David Orr, in order to bring transparency to Chicago and Cook County tax increment financing districts, began to feature information regarding Chicago area districts on his office's website. The information featured includes City of Chicago TIF revenue by year, maps of Chicago and Cook County suburban municipalities' TIF districts.

The Neighborhood Capital Budget Group of Chicago, Illinois, a non-profit organization, advocated for area resident participation in capital programs. The group also researched and analyzed the expansion of Chicago's TIF districts.

In April 2009, the "TIF Sunshine Ordinance" introduced by Alderman Scott Waguespack and Alderman Manuel Flores (then 1st Ward Alderman) passed City Council. The ordinance made all TIF Redevelopment Agreements and attachments available on the city's website in a searchable electronic format. The proposal intended to improve the overall transparency of TIF Agreements, thereby facilitating significantly increased public accountability.

According to an article published in the Journal of Property Tax Assessment & Administration in 2009, the increase in the use of TIF in Chicago resulted in a "substantial portion of Chicago's property tax base and the land area" being subsumed by these levy zones—"26 percent of the city's land area and almost a quarter of the total value of commercial property is in TIF districts" by 2007. The study notes the difficulties in establishing how effective TIF are.

=== Albuquerque ===
Currently, the 2nd largest TIF project in America is located in Albuquerque, New Mexico: the $500 million Mesa del Sol development. Mesa del Sol is controversial in that the proposed development would be built upon a "green field" that presently generates little tax revenue and any increase in tax revenue would be diverted into a tax increment financing fund. This "increment" thus would leave governmental bodies without funding from the developed area that is necessary for the governmental bodies' operation.

=== Detroit ===
In July 2014, Detroit's Downtown Development Authority announced TIF financing to build a new arena for the Detroit Red Wings. The total project cost, including additional private investments in retail and housing, is estimated at $650 million, of which $250 million will be financed using TIF capture to repay 30-year tax exempt bonds purchased by the Michigan Strategic Fund, the state's economic development arm.

=== California ===
In an article published in 1998 by Public Policy Institute of California, Michael Dardia challenged the governing redevelopment agencies' (RDAs) assumption "that redevelopment pays for itself through tax increment financing. The claim is that RDAs "receive any increase in property tax revenues (above a two percent inflation factor) in project areas because their investment in area improvements is responsible for increasing property values." Dardia argued that property tax revenues channeled to tax increment financing results in revenues lost to "other local jurisdictions—the county, schools, and special districts" and if the RDAs "are not largely responsible for the increase in property values, those jurisdictions are, in effect, subsidizing redevelopment, with no say in how the revenues are used."

In fiscal year 1994–1995—the most recent year for which figures are available—redevelopment agencies (RDAs) received 8 percent of the property tax revenues collected in the state of California, amounting to $1.5 billion. These are revenues that, absent the RDAs, would have gone to other public agencies such as the state and counties.

— Michael Dardia 1998

By December 6, 2010, Governor Arnold Schwarzenegger issued a fiscal emergency which was reaffirmed by Governor Jerry Brown in December 2011 to underscore "the need for immediate legislative action to address California's massive budget deficit." Governor Brown enacted measures to stabilize school funding by reducing or eliminating the diversion of property taxes from the public sector including, school districts, to RDAs. New legislation including Assembly Bill 26 and Assembly Bill 27 were passed, which led to the elimination of California's nearly 400 redevelopment agencies thereby stopping the diversion of property tax revenues from public funding. The RDAs appealed the decision, however they were eventually eliminated. The state reintroduced the option of tax-increment financing for the funding of Community Revitalization and Investment Authorities (CRIAs) in 2015, the latter being authorities created by local governments to create or upgrade infrastructure and create or preserve affordable housing for low and moderate income households. Enhanced Infrastructure Financing Districts (EIFDs) in the state are also financed by a tax-increment bond and their purposes are largely similar, though the requirement for use and the projects covered are somewhat different.

==== Alameda ====
In 2009, SunCal Companies, an Irvine, California-based developer, introduced a ballot initiative that embodied a redevelopment plan for the former Naval Air Station Alameda and a financial plan based in part on roughly $200 million worth of tax increment financing to pay for public amenities. SunCal structured the initiative so that the provision of public amenities was contingent on receiving tax increment financing, and on the creation of a community facilities (Mello-Roos) district, which would levy a special (extra) tax on property owners within the development. Since Alameda City Council did not extend the Exclusive Negotiation Agreement with Suncal, this project will not move forward. In California, Community Redevelopment Law governs the use of tax increment financing by public agencies.

=== Iowa ===
In 2002 economists at Iowa State University claimed that "existing taxpayers, its householders, wage earners, and retirees are aggressively subsidizing business growth and population" TIF designated zones in Iowa.

=== Wisconsin ===
TIFs were established in Wisconsin in 1975. In 2001 critics argued that TIF supported developers to develop in green spaces citing a 2000 1,000 Friends of Wisconsin report which stated that 45% of tax incremental financing districts were used to develop open space land.

=== Denver ===
From 1995 through 2005 Denver tax payers were able to leverage over $5 billion in private investment by committing to over half a billion dollars of TIF subsidies. At that time new TIF subsidized projects under consideration included the "redevelopment of the old Gates Rubber Factory complex at I-25 and Broadway, and the realization of Denver's ambitious plans for the downtown Union Station area." Denver's urban landscape was transformed from 1995 through 2005 through TIF-subsidized projects such as "the landmark resurrection" of the Denver Dry Goods building, the Adams Mark hotel, Denver Pavilions, and REI flagship store, Broadway Marketplace shopping area and the demolition of the old Woolworth's building, the relocation and expansion of Elitch's into the Six Flags Elitch Gardens Amusement park, the redevelopment of Lowry Air Force Base and the redevelopment of the old Stapleton airport—"the largest urban infill project in the nation."

By 2005 the City of Denver had already "mortgaged over $500 million in future tax revenue to pay off existing TIF subsidies to private developers" and was preparing to "increase that sum substantially with several new TIF projects in the next five years." In 2005 the "diversions of tax revenue to pay for TIF subsidies [represented] an annual cost of almost $30 million to Denver taxpayers, and [were] rising rapidly." By 2007 TIF tax expenditures in the form of forgone tax revenue totaled nearly "$30 million annually—equal to almost 7% of Denver's entire annual General Fund revenues" and at that time the amount was rapidly increasing. In a 2005 study it was revealed through wage surveys at TIF projects "that jobs there pay substantially less than Denver average wages, and 14%-27% less even than average wages for comparable occupational categories."

In part 1 of a three part series researchers "explained the history and mechanics of TIF, and analyzed the total cost of TIF to Denver taxpayers, including "hidden" costs from increased public service burdens that TIF projects do not pay for." In "Who Profits from TIF Subsidies?" researchers "examined the types of businesses Denver attracts through TIF, and the profit rates of developers with whom Denver partners to bring TIF projects into existence, and the transparency of the TIF approval process." In part three of the study researchers examined "quality and housing affordability at TIF-subsidized projects."

=== Omaha Streetcar ===
In 2022 the City of Omaha, Nebraska, approved a modern streetcar project to be financed largely through tax increment financing within a new urban core redevelopment district. The plan applies TIF to more than 1,100 parcels of mostly high-value downtown real estate, with projections that several hundred million dollars in incremental property tax revenue will be used over the life of the district to repay project-related bonds rather than flow to overlapping taxing entities. In a 2024 advisory letter to the Nebraska Legislature, State Auditor Mike Foley highlighted the streetcar as an example of the expanded use of TIF in Omaha, noting that TIF “diverts temporarily the revenues from that portion of the increased property tax valuation” and that, while dedicated to redevelopment projects, those “excess” property taxes are unavailable for public education and other local government obligations.

== Applications and administration ==
Cities use TIF to finance public infrastructure, land acquisition, demolition, utilities and planning costs, and other improvements including sewer expansion and repair, curb and sidewalk work, storm drainage, traffic control, street construction and expansion, street lighting, water supply, landscaping, park improvements, environmental remediation, bridge construction and repair, and parking structures.

State enabling legislation gives local governments the authority to designate tax increment financing districts. The district usually lasts 20 years, or enough time to pay back the bonds issued to fund the improvements. While arrangements vary, it is common to have a city government assuming the administrative role, making decisions about how and where the tool is applied.

Most jurisdictions only allow bonds to be floated based upon a portion (usually capped at 50%) of the assumed increase in tax revenues. For example, if a $5,000,000 annual tax increment is expected in a development, which would cover the financing costs of a $50,000,000 bond, only a $25,000,000 bond would be typically allowed. If the project is moderately successful, this would mean that a good portion of the expected annual tax revenues (in this case over $2,000,000) would be dedicated to other public purposes other than paying off the bond.

== Community revitalization levy (CRL) in Canada ==
In Canada, a similar financing system is known as a community revitalization levy.

== See also ==
- Corporate welfare
- Public finance
- Value capture
