= Agrarian Justice =

1797 pamphlet by Thomas Paine

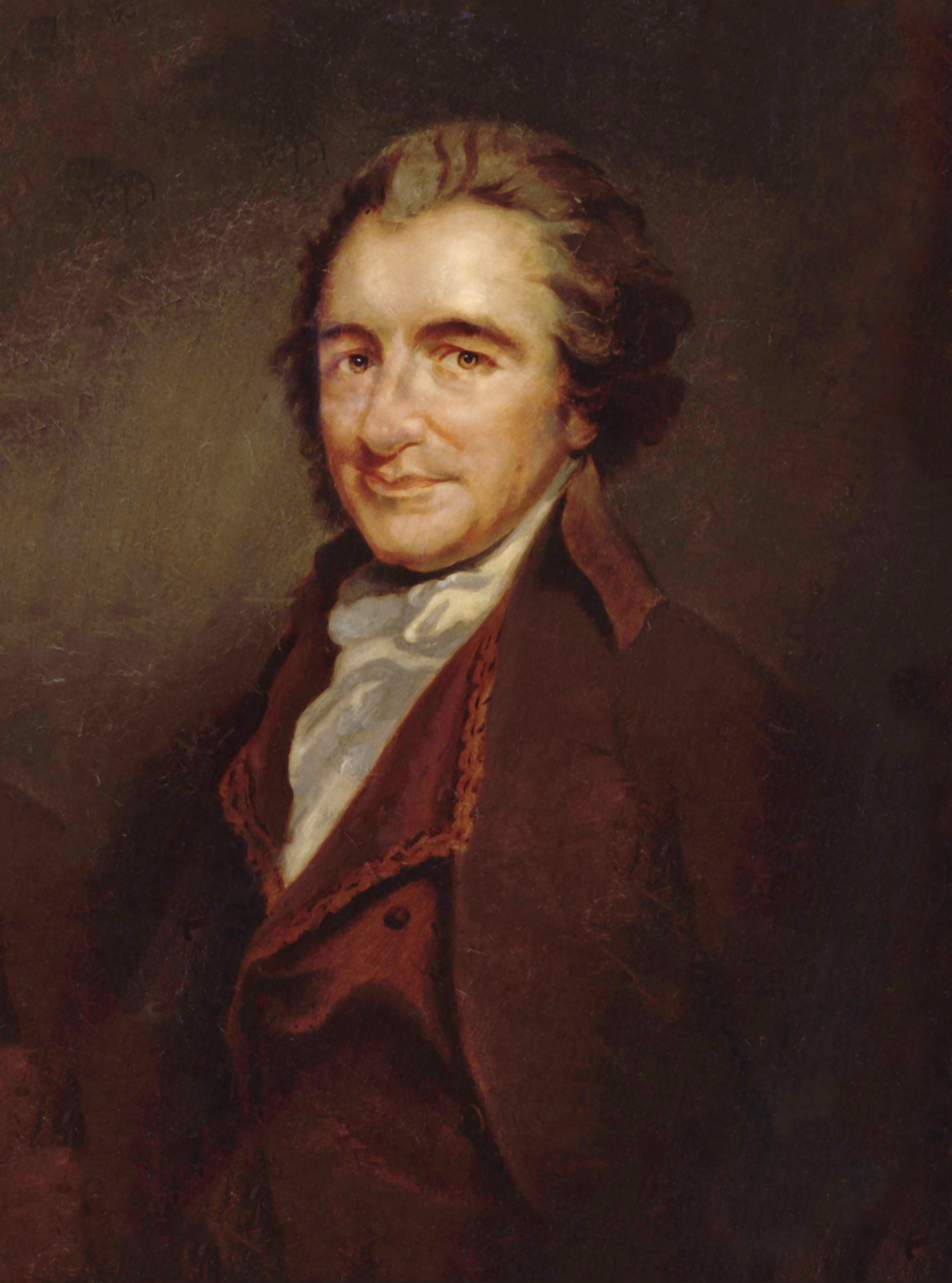
Thomas Paine, 1792

Agrarian Justice is a pamphlet written by Thomas Paine and published in 1797, which proposed that those who possess cultivated land owe the community a ground rent, which justifies an estate tax to fund universal old-age and disability pensions and a fixed sum to be paid to all citizens upon reaching maturity.

It was written in the winter of 1795–96 but remained unpublished for a year. Paine was undecided whether to wait until the end of the ongoing war with France before publishing, however, having read a sermon by Richard Watson, the Bishop of Llandaff, which discussed the "Wisdom... of God, in having made both Rich and Poor," he felt the need to publish under the argument that "rich" and "poor" were arbitrary divisions, not divinely created ones.

== Proposed system ==
In response to the private sale of royal (or common) lands, Paine proposed a detailed plan to tax land owners once per generation to pay for the needs of those who have no land. Some consider this a precursor to the modern idea of citizen's dividend or basic income. The money would be raised by taxing all direct inheritances at 10%, and "indirect" inheritances, those not going to close relations, at a somewhat higher rate. He estimated that to raise around £5,700,000 per year.

Around two-thirds of the fund would be spent on pension payments of £10 per year to every person over the age of 50, which Paine had taken as his average adult life expectancy.

Most of the remainder would be used to make fixed payments of £15 to every man and woman on reaching the age of 21, then the age of legal majority.

The small remainder of the money raised that was still unused would be used for paying pensions to "the lame and blind."

For context, the average weekly wage of an agricultural labourer was around 9 shillings, which would mean an annual income of about £23 for an able-bodied man working throughout the year.

Paine's proposal presaged the social safety net of later eras and governments, proposing seven entitlements to protect the poorest citizens from the ravages of market capitalism:

1. Grants to subsidize schooling of 4 pounds per annum
2. One-time payments to adults on reaching maturity
3. One-time payments to newly married couples and new parents
4. Eliminate taxes on working poor
5. Back-to-work schemes
6. Pensions for seniors
7. Burial benefits to surviving spouses

and also provided a scheme of how to pay for them.

== Philosophical background ==
The work is based on the contention that in the state of nature, "the earth, in its natural uncultivated state ... was the common property of the human race." The concept of private ownership arose as a necessary result of the development of agriculture since it was impossible to distinguish the possession of improvements to the land from the possession of the land itself. Thus, Paine viewed private property as necessary while at the same time asserting that the basic needs of all humanity must be provided for by those with property, who have originally taken it from the general public. In some sense, that is their "payment" to non-property holders for the right to hold private property.

== Critiques ==
Historian Richard Bell described Agrarian Justice as "an extraordinary social justice manifesto", that is "not proto-Marxism" but rather "a non-Marxist critique of the free market that lays no plans to nationalize ... or limit property or ... acquisition".

== See also ==
- Common Sense
- Georgism
- Geolibertarianism
- Citizen's dividend
