= Henry George =

American political economist (1839–1897)

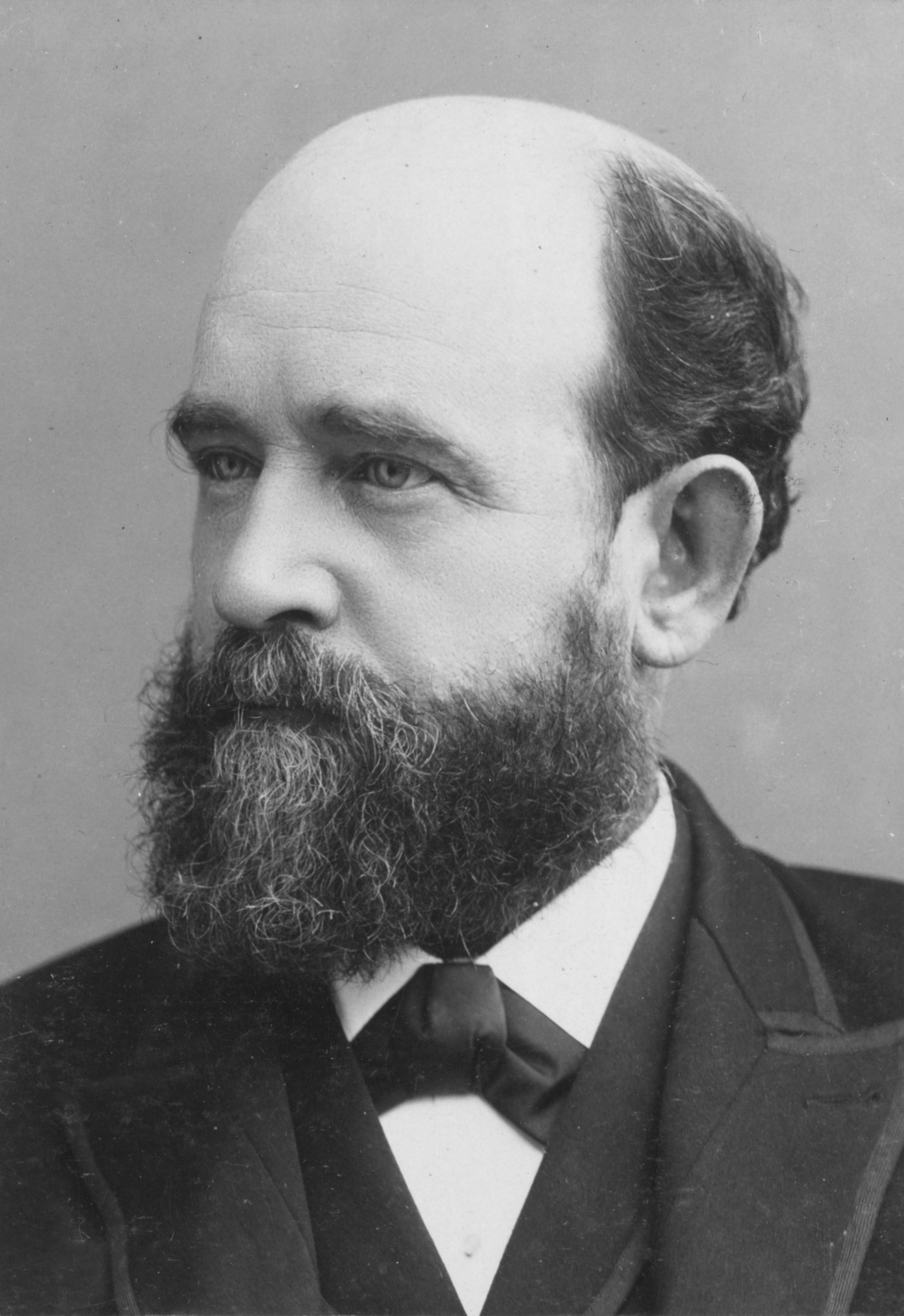
- George in 1886
- Born: September 2, 1839; Philadelphia, Pennsylvania, U.S.
- Died: October 29, 1897 (aged 58); New York City, New York, U.S.
- Resting place: Green-Wood Cemetery
- Political party: Democratic
- Other political affiliations: Republican (before 1869); Workingmen's (1878); United Labor (1886); Jefferson Democracy (1897)
- Spouse: Annie Corsina Fox (m. 1861)
- Children: 4, including Henry Jr. and Anna

Philosophical work
- Era: Modern philosophy; 19th-century philosophy
- Region: Western philosophy; American philosophy
- School: Georgism
- Main interests: Economics; comparative; ethics; land; philosophy; ethics; politics
- Notable works: Progress and Poverty (1879); Protection or Free Trade (1886)
- Notable ideas: Citizen's dividend; Free public goods from land value capture; Georgism; Land value tax; Municipalization; Monetary sovereignty; Single tax; Spaceship Earth; Theory of land monopoly; Unearned income

California State Inspector of Gas Meters
- In office January 7, 1876 – April 8, 1880
- Appointed by: William Irwin
- Preceded by: James L. Bissell
- Succeeded by: John F. Kessing

Military service
- Allegiance: United States
- Branch/service: California National Guard
- Years of service: 1866

Henry George (September 2, 1839 – October 29, 1897) was an American political economist, social philosopher and journalist. His writing was popular in 19th-century America and sparked several reform movements of the Progressive Era. He inspired the economic philosophy known as Georgism, the belief that people should own the value they produce themselves, but that the economic value of land (including natural resources) should belong equally to all members of society. George famously argued that a single tax on land values would create a more productive and just society.

His most famous work, Progress and Poverty (1879), sold millions of copies worldwide. The treatise investigated the paradox of increasing inequality and poverty amid economic and technological progress, the business cycle with its cyclic nature of industrialized economies, and the use of rent capture such as land value taxation and other anti-monopoly reforms as a remedy for these and other social problems. Other works by George defended free trade, the secret ballot, free (at marginal cost) public utilities/transportation provided by the capture of their resulting land rent uplift, Pigouvian taxation, and public ownership of other natural monopolies.

George was a journalist for many years, and the popularity of his writing and speeches brought him to run for election as Mayor of New York City in 1886 as the United Labor Party nominee and in 1897 as the Jefferson Democracy nominee, where he received 31 percent and 4 percent of the vote respectively and finished ahead of former New York State Assembly minority leader and future U.S. president Theodore Roosevelt in the first race. After his death during the second campaign, his ideas were carried forward by organizations and political leaders through the United States and other Anglophone countries. The mid-20th century labor economist and journalist George Soule wrote that George was by far "the most famous American economic writer" and "author of a book which probably had a larger world-wide circulation than any other work on economics ever written."

== Personal life ==
=== Early life ===
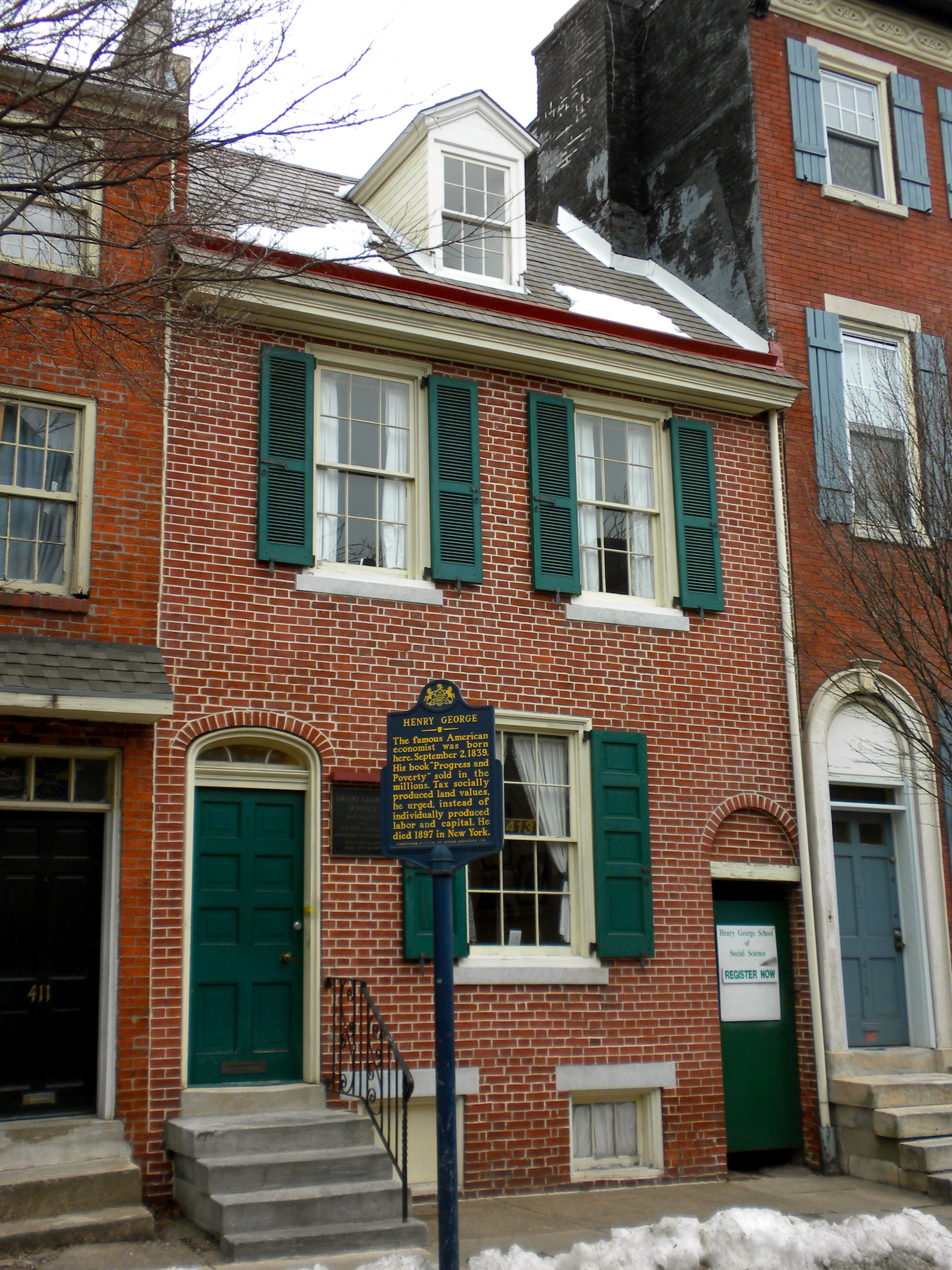
Henry George Birthplace in Philadelphia

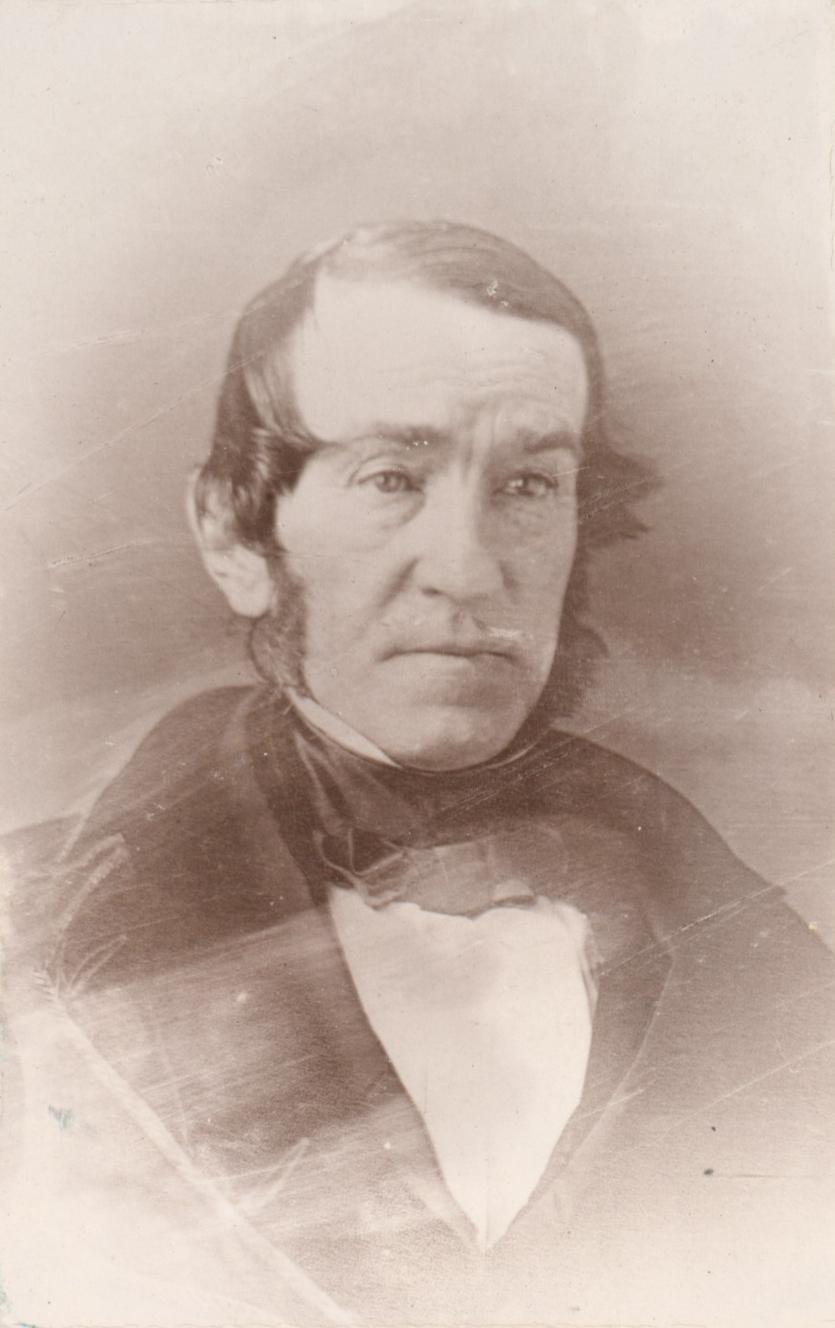
George's father Richard S. H. George

George was born in Philadelphia to a lower-middle-class family, the second of ten children of Richard S. H. George and Catharine Pratt George (née Vallance). His father was a publisher of religious texts and a devout Episcopalian, and he sent George to the Episcopal Academy in Philadelphia. George chafed at his religious upbringing and left the academy without graduating. Instead he convinced his father to hire a tutor and supplemented this with avid reading and attending lectures at the Franklin Institute. His formal education ended at age 14, and he went to sea as a foremast boy at age 15 in April 1855 on the Hindoo, bound for Melbourne and Calcutta. He ended up in the American West in 1858 and briefly considered prospecting for gold but instead started work the same year in San Francisco as a type setter.

In California, George fell in love with Annie Corsina Fox from Sydney, Australia. They met on her seventeenth birthday on October 12, 1860. She had been orphaned and was living with an uncle. The uncle, a prosperous, strong-minded man, was opposed to his niece's impoverished suitor. But the couple, defying him, eloped and married on December 3, 1861, with Henry dressed in a borrowed suit and Annie bringing only a packet of books.

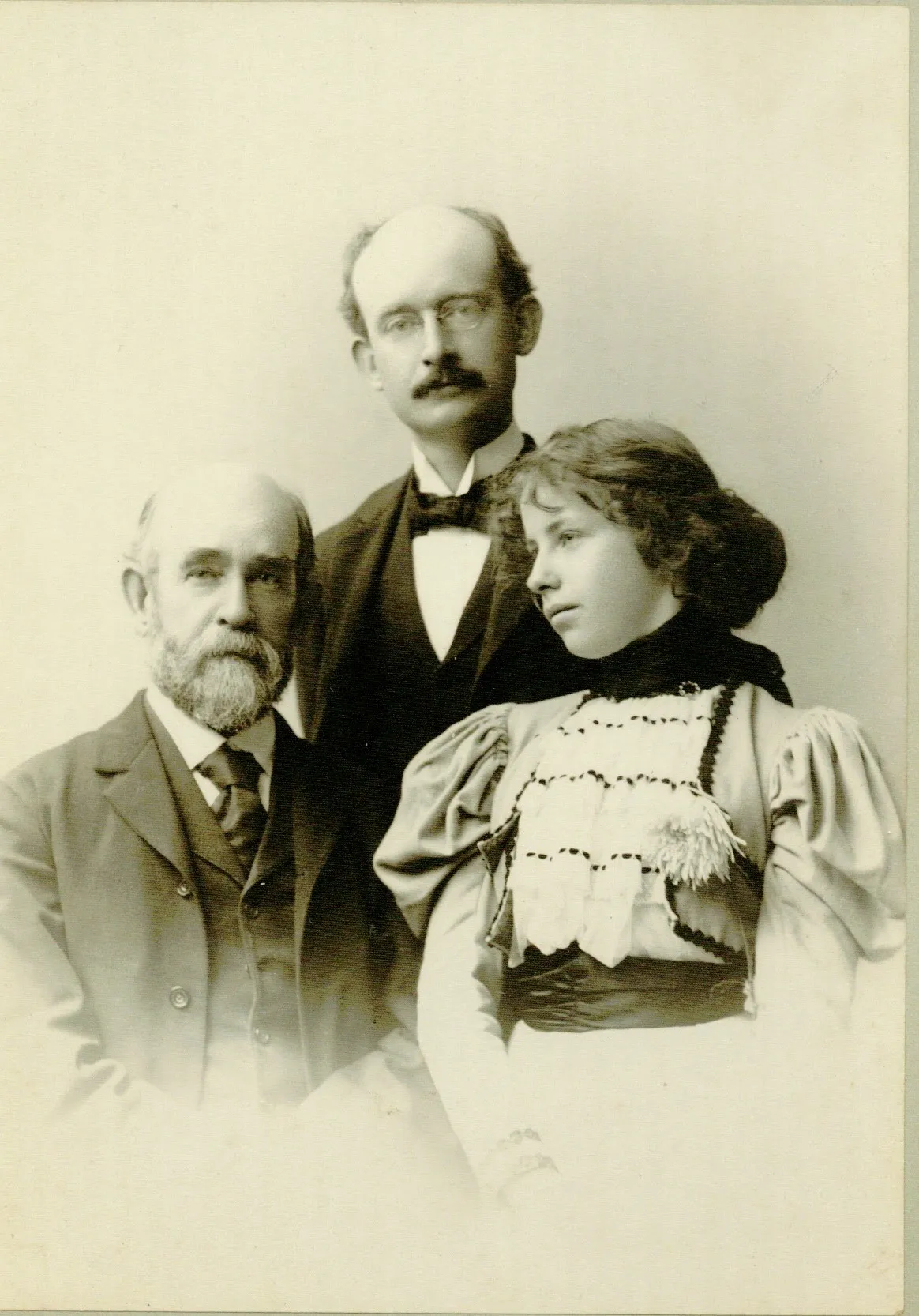
George with his son Henry Jr. and daughter Anna c. 1897

The marriage was a happy one, and four children were born to them. On November 3, 1862, Annie gave birth to Henry George Jr. (1862–1916), a future United States Representative from New York. Early on, even with the birth of future sculptor Richard F. George (1865–1912), the family was near starvation. George's other two children were both daughters. The first was Jennie George, (c. 1867–1897), later to become Jennie George Atkinson. George's other daughter was Anna Angela George (1878–1947), who would become mother of both future dancer and choreographer Agnes de Mille and future actress Peggy George, who was born Margaret George de Mille.

Following the birth of his second child, George had no work and no money and had to beg for food. As he approached the first well-dressed stranger he saw in the street, George, normally a lawful man, decided to rob him if he was unwilling to help. Fortunately, the man took pity on him and gave him five dollars.

George was raised as an Episcopalian, but he believed in "deistic humanitarianism". His wife Annie was Irish Catholic, but Henry George Jr. wrote that the children were mainly influenced by Henry George's deism and humanism.

=== Career in journalism ===
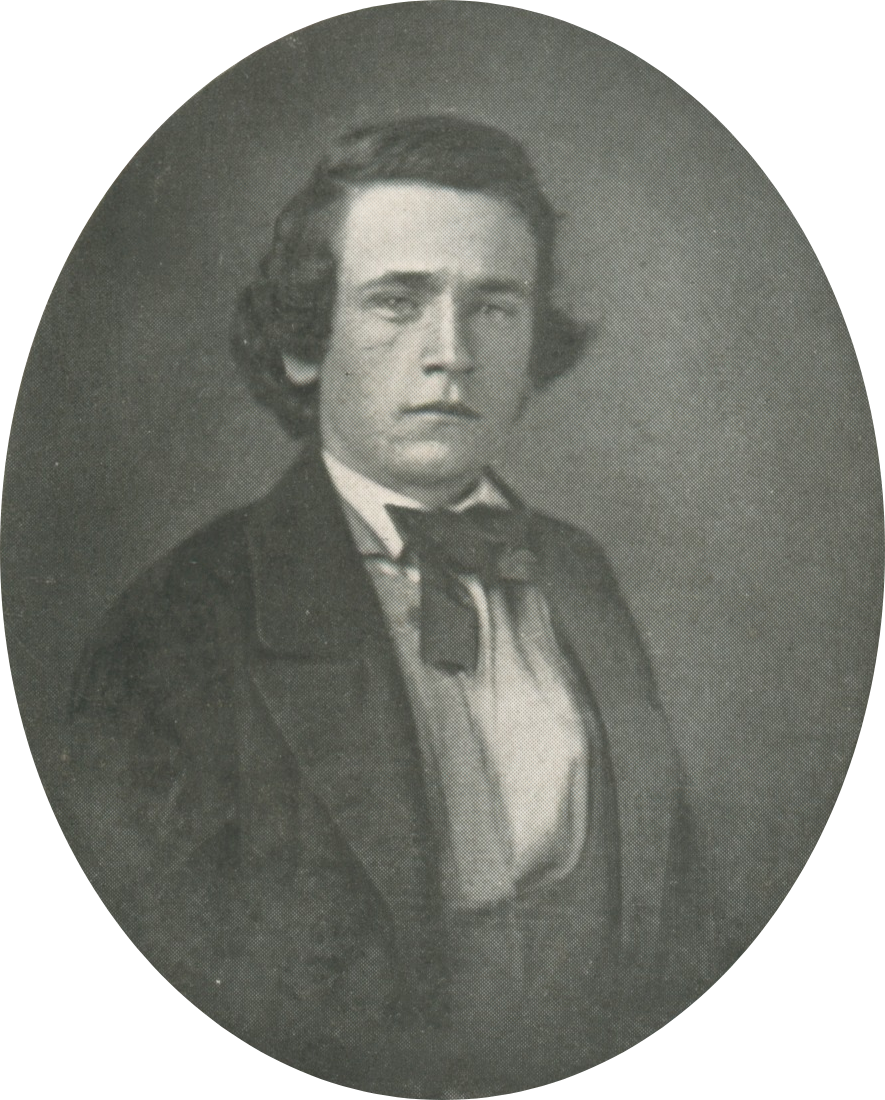
George in 1857, age 17–18

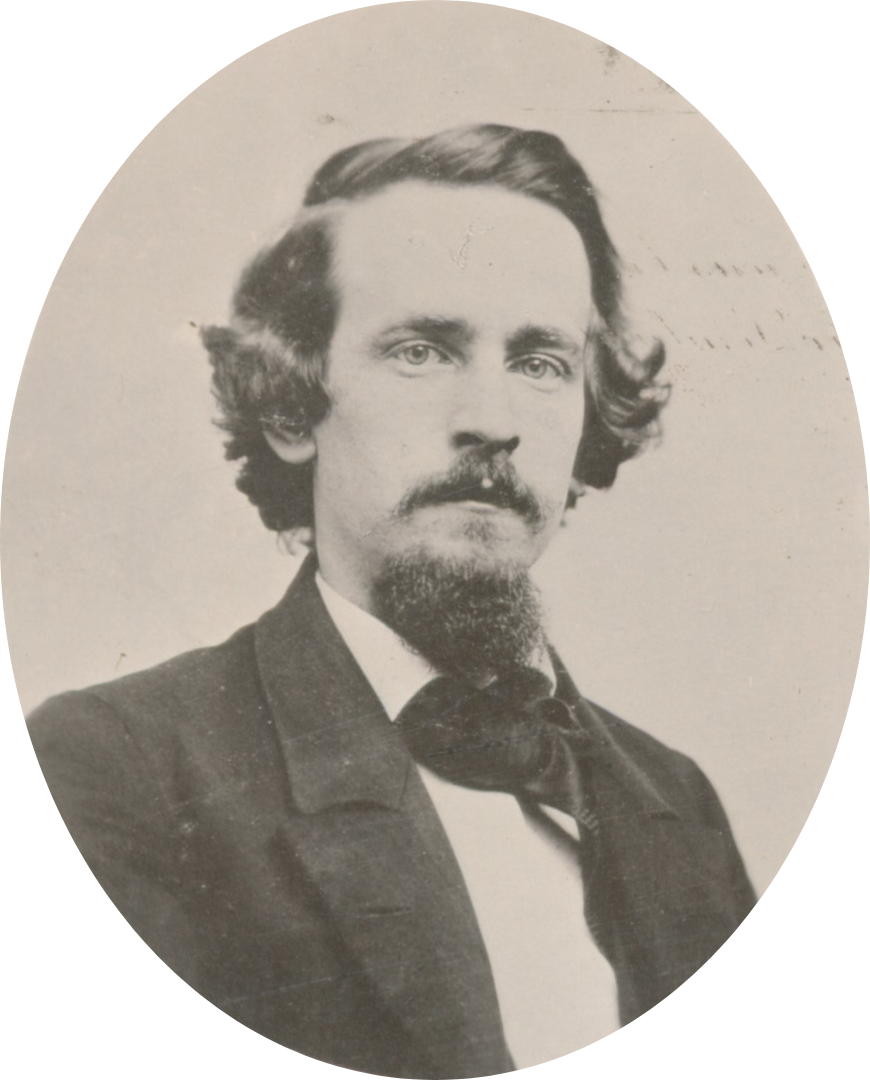
George c. 1860–1861, age 21

After deciding against gold mining in British Columbia, George was hired as a printer for the newly created San Francisco Times. He was able to immediately submit editorials for publication, including the popular What the Railroads Will Bring Us (1868), which remained required reading in California schools for decades. George climbed the ranks of the Times, eventually becoming managing editor in the summer of 1867.

George's first nationally prominent writing was his 1869 essay The Chinese in California, in which he wrote that Chinese immigration should be ended before Chinese immigrants overrun the western United States.

George worked for several papers, including four years (1871–1875) as editor of his own newspaper, the San Francisco Daily Evening Post, and for a time running the Reporter, a Democratic anti-monopoly publication. George experienced four tough years of trying to keep his newspaper afloat and was eventually forced to go to the streets to beg. The George family struggled, but George's improving reputation and involvement in the newspaper industry lifted them from poverty.

=== Political and economic philosophy ===
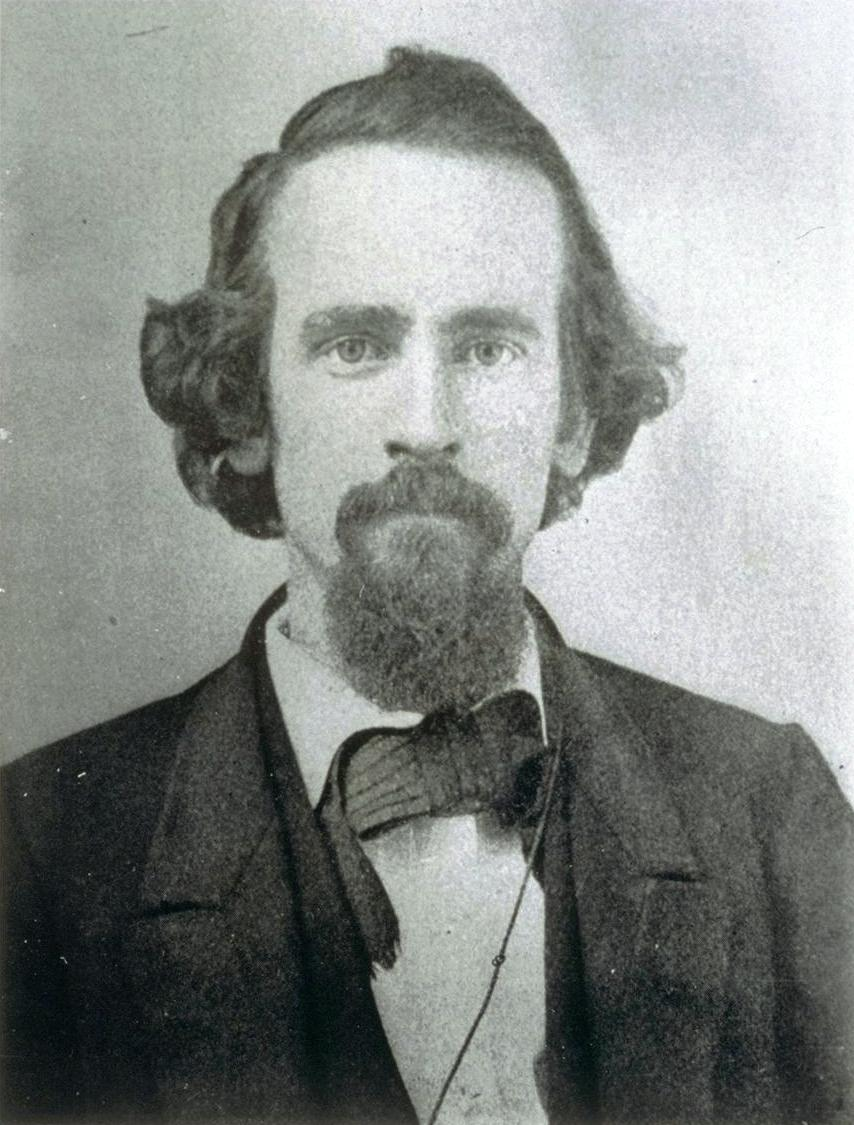
George in 1865, age 26

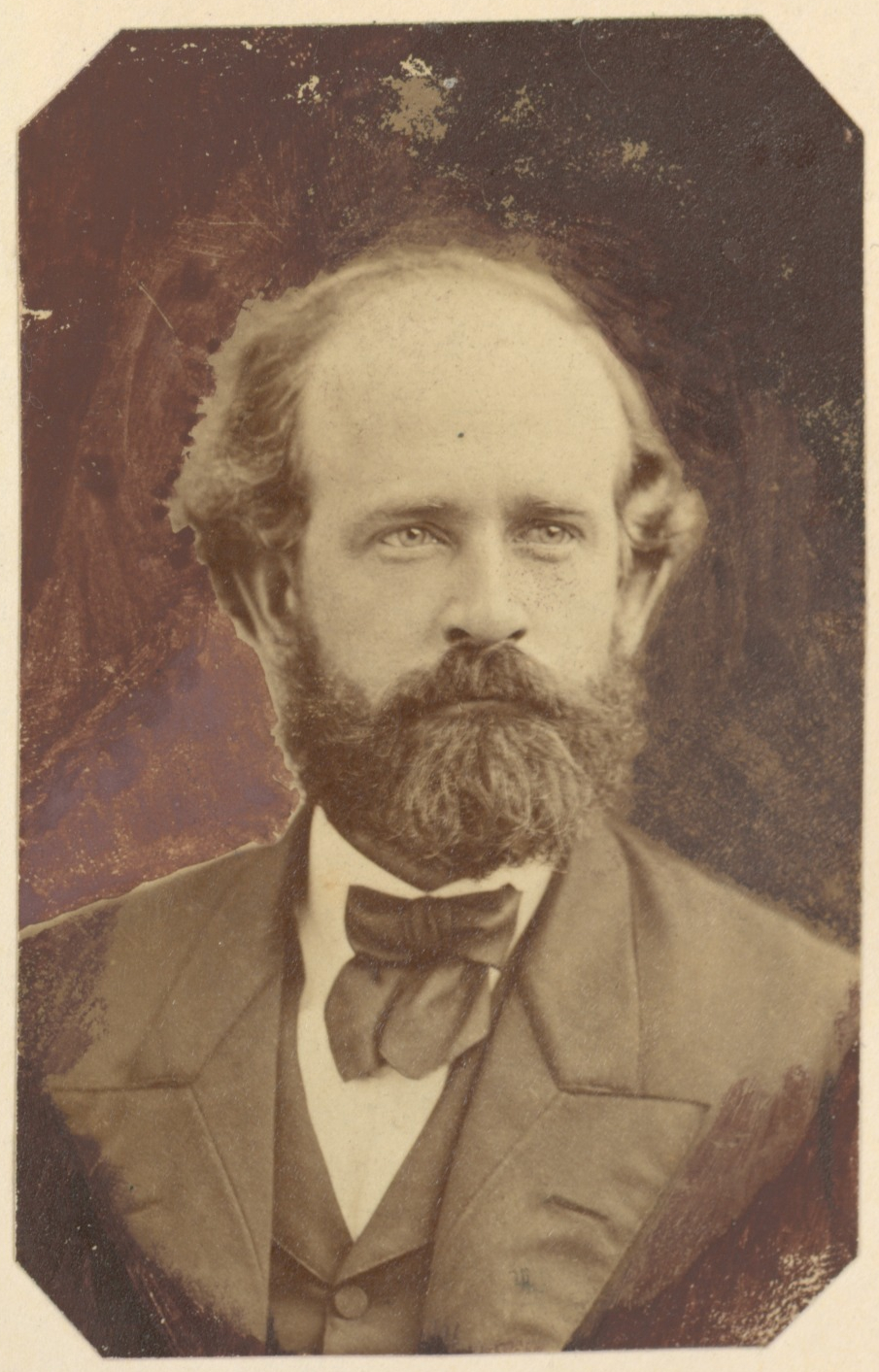
George c. 1870–1871, age 31

George began as a Lincoln Republican, then eventually became a Democrat. He was a strong critic of railroad and mining interests, corrupt politicians, land speculators, and labor contractors. He first articulated his views in an 1868 article entitled "What the Railroad Will Bring Us." George argued that the boom in railroad construction would benefit only the lucky few who owned interests in the railroads and other related enterprises, while throwing the greater part of the population into abject poverty. This had led to him earning the enmity of the Central Pacific Railroad's executives, who helped defeat his bid for election to the California State Assembly.

One day in 1871, George went for a horseback ride and stopped to rest while overlooking San Francisco Bay. He later wrote of the revelation that he had:

I asked a passing teamster, for want of something better to say, what land was worth there. He pointed to some cows grazing so far off that they looked like mice, and said, "I don't know exactly, but there is a man over there who will sell some land for a thousand dollars an acre." Like a flash it came over me that there was the reason of advancing poverty with advancing wealth. With the growth of population, land grows in value, and the men who work it must pay more for the privilege.

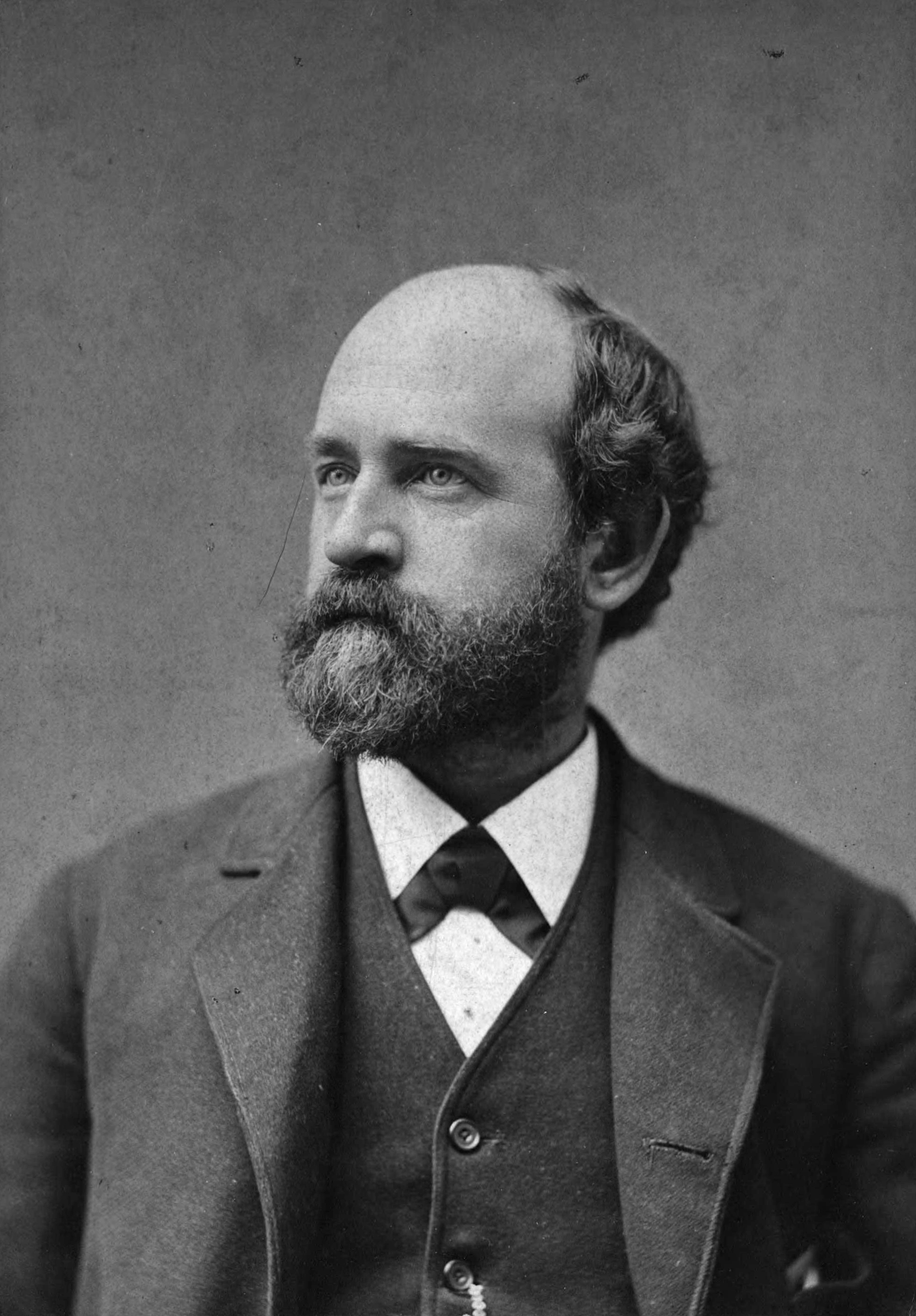
Portrait by I. W. Taber, taken shortly after writing Progress and Poverty

Furthermore, on a visit to New York City, he was struck by the apparent paradox that the poor in that long-established city were much worse off than the poor in less developed California. These observations supplied the theme and title for his 1879 book Progress and Poverty, which was a great success, selling over three million copies. In it George made the argument that a sizeable portion of the wealth created by social and technological advances in a free market economy is possessed by land owners and monopolists via economic rents, and that this concentration of unearned wealth is the main cause of poverty.

George considered it a great injustice that private profit was being earned from restricting access to natural resources while productive activity was burdened with heavy taxes, and he indicated that such a system was equivalent to slavery. This is also the work in which he made the case for a land value tax in which governments would tax the value of the land itself, thus preventing private interests from profiting upon its mere possession but allowing the value of all improvements made to that land to remain with investors.

George was in a position to discover this pattern, having experienced poverty himself, knowing many different societies from his travels, and living in California at a time of rapid growth. In particular he had noticed that the construction of railroads in California was increasing land values and rents as fast as or faster than wages were rising.

== Political career ==
=== California ===
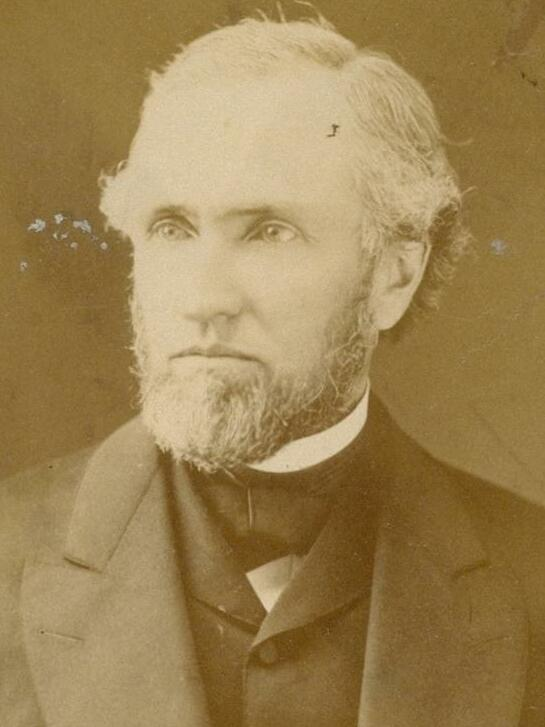
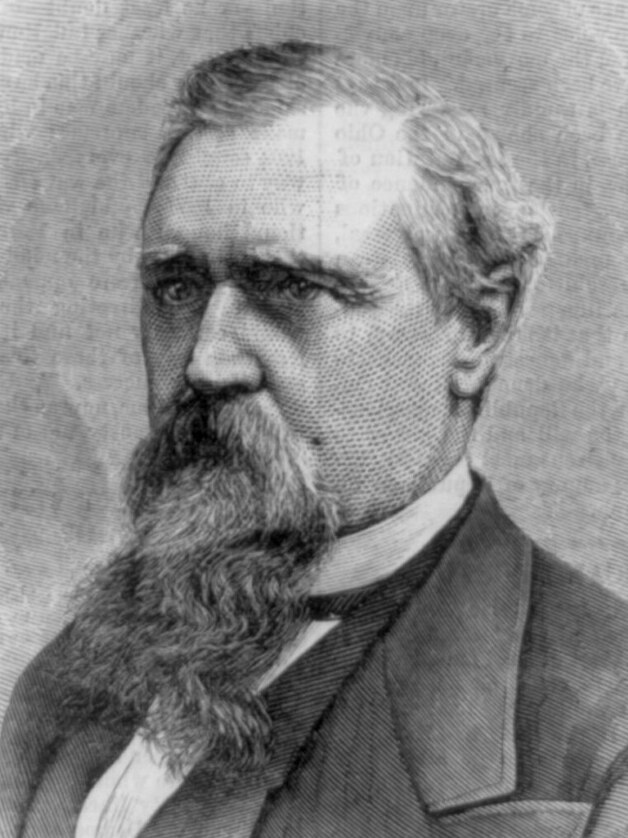
California Governors Henry Huntly Haight and William Irwin, who fostered George's early political career

George first ran for public office in 1869, when he sought the Democratic nomination for California State Assembly. However, he refused to pay the party's assessment fee, and was therefore ineligible for consideration. Despite this setback, he remained active in the California Democratic Party. Governor Henry Huntly Haight, impressed by the young journalist, recruited George to manage the party's newspaper in Sacramento, and in 1871 he served as secretary of the Democratic state convention as it renominated Haight. Later that year, he finally received the party's nomination for State Assembly, but was defeated alongside the rest of the ticket in a Republican landslide.

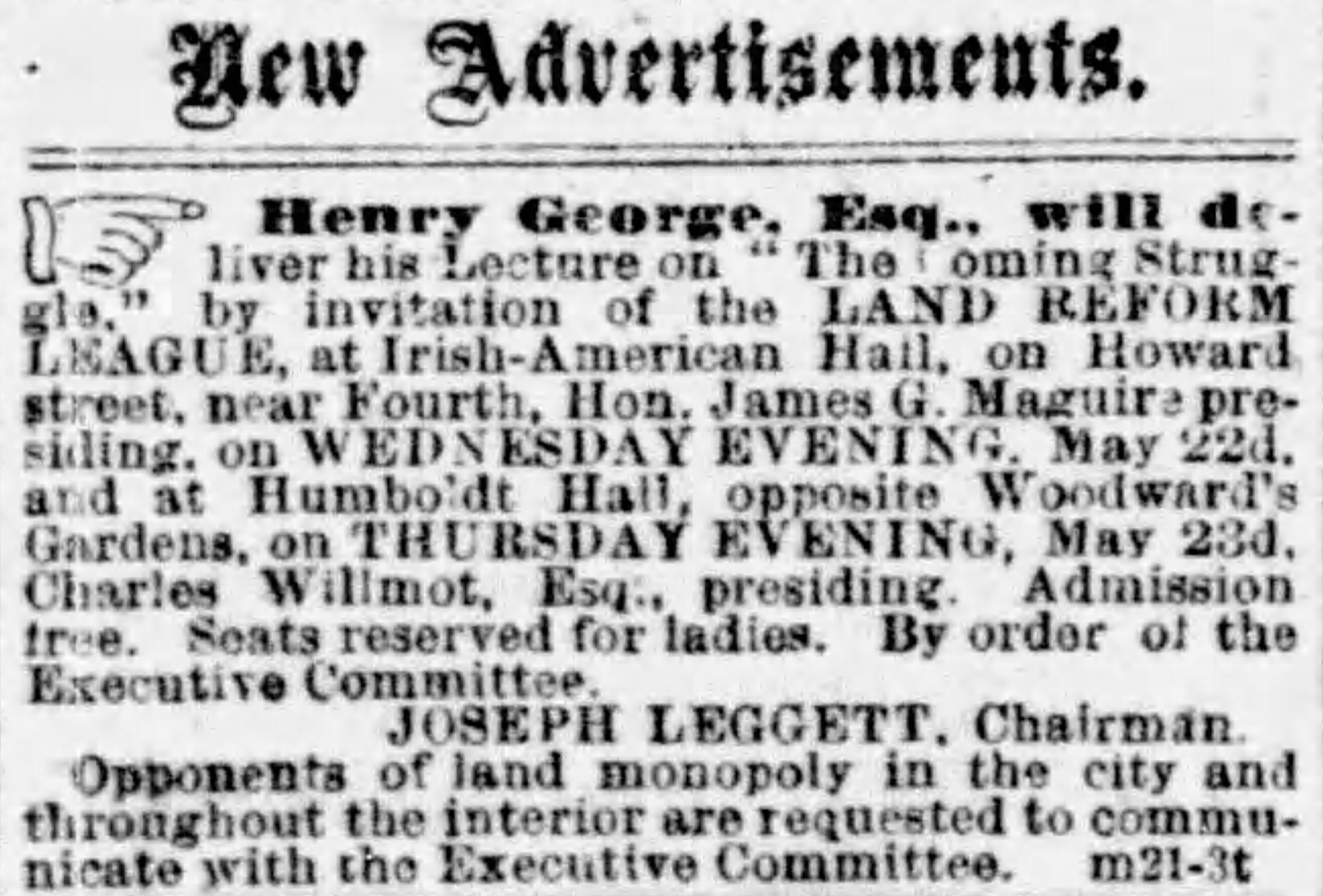
Advertisement in the San Francisco Chronicle for the local Land Reform League featuring George and future Congressman James G. Maguire, May 21, 1878

In the 1875 election, George campaigned for Democrat William Irwin, who handily won thanks to Republican vote splitting. A few months later, George was forced to give up the Evening Post due to a financial dispute with U.S. Senator John P. Jones. Unable to find work or provide for his family, George wrote to Governor Irwin, who rewarded him with the office of State Inspector of Gas Meters. George held that office from 1876 to 1880, during which he was able to write Progress and Poverty. He also supplemented his income with paid lectures. Among those he consulted while writing the book were former State Superintendent of Public Instruction John Swett, University of California Regent Andrew Smith Hallidie, Sacramento Bee editor James McClatchy, Assemblyman James V. Coffey, former Assemblyman James G. Maguire, and doctor Edward Robeson Taylor.

Around the same time, the anti-Chinese Workingmen's Party led by Denis Kearney was increasing in popularity. George supported the party and endorsed their platform, but took issue with Kearney himself. When California's Second Constitutional Convention was called in 1878, George was nominated as a delegate on both the Democratic and Workingmen's tickets, but lost the latter's nomination after he refused to recognize Kearney as leader of the party. While an anti-Kearney faction still nominated him, his refusal to toe the party line cost him the election, though he still polled the highest of any Democrat in the district.

While campaigning for the Democrats in California, George "cast black men in the South and Chinese in the West as tools of the corporations and the rich, and as threats to white manhood."

Imagine our Chinese population increased until it equaled or exceeded in number the whites. Imagine them all voters. Place in thought in the gubernatorial chair a canting hypocrite from the East, elected by Chinese votes, and holding office only to make as much out of it as he could before leaving the country. Fill up your legislature with Chinamen, Eastern adventurers, and whites from the Barbary Coast. Imagine Chinese militia, Chinese policemen, Chinese judges and Chinese school directors. Imagine the debt of the state run up at forty or fifty millions of dollars, every public fund squandered in the most shameless corruption... Gentlemen do you think that California in this condition would be a peaceful state?

— Henry George, Speech Made in San Francisco During the 1876 Presidential Election, in Henry George Papers (New York Public Library)

When the California State Legislature convened in 1881 to elect a U.S. Senator, State Senator Warren Chase nominated George. In his nomination speech, Chase eulogized George as follows:

He has in knowledge of American and European history no superior in this State. He is a man who can be an honor to the State and nation and to the United States Senate, and an honor to himself; a man whose heart beats in sympathy with the great body of the people; a man who is eminently like unto that greatest of modern men—Abraham Lincoln; a man who, if the people were to select, would be selected as the champion of their rights; a man—a man who has already gained a national reputation as the ablest political economist of America, standing the peer of John Stuart Mill, Ricardo and Adam Smith, and all the writers of history on political economy.

George only received two votes out of 40 cast in the State Senate; one from Chase, and the other from fellow Workingmen's Senator Joseph C. Gorman.

=== New York ===
In 1880, now a popular writer and speaker, George moved to New York City, becoming closely allied with the Irish nationalist community despite being of English ancestry. From there he made several speaking journeys abroad to places such as Ireland and Scotland where access to land was (and still is) a major political issue.

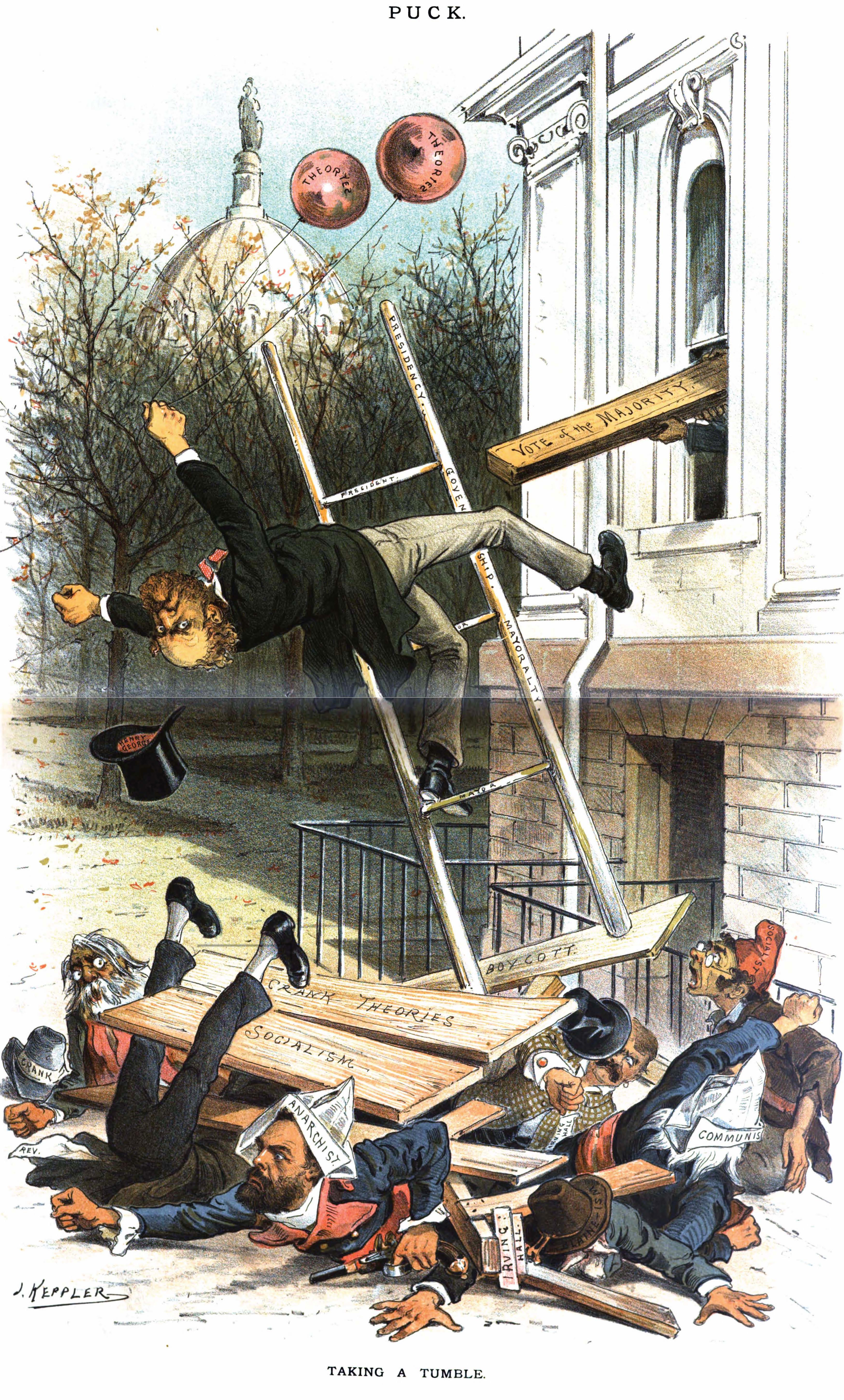
"Taking a tumble," a political cartoon by Joseph Keppler published in Puck depicting George's defeat in the 1886 New York City mayoral election, November 10, 1886

In 1886, George campaigned for mayor of New York City as the candidate of the short-lived United Labor Party. George was strongly supported in that campaign by his longtime ally in promoting the Single Tax theory, Charles Frederic Adams. He polled second, more than the Republican candidate Theodore Roosevelt. The election was won by Tammany Hall candidate Abram Stevens Hewitt by what many of George's supporters believed was fraud.

In the 1887 New York state elections, George came in a distant third in the election for Secretary of State of New York. The United Labor Party was soon weakened by internal divisions: the management was essentially Georgist, but as a party of organized labor it also included some Marxist members who did not want to distinguish between land and capital, many Catholic members who were discouraged by the excommunication of Father Edward McGlynn, and many who disagreed with George's free trade policy. George had particular trouble with Terrence V. Powderly, president of the Knights of Labor, a key member of the United Labor coalition. While initially friendly with Powderly, George vigorously opposed the tariff policies which Powderly and many other labor leaders thought vital to the protection of American workers. George's strident criticism of the tariff set him against Powderly and others in the labor movement.

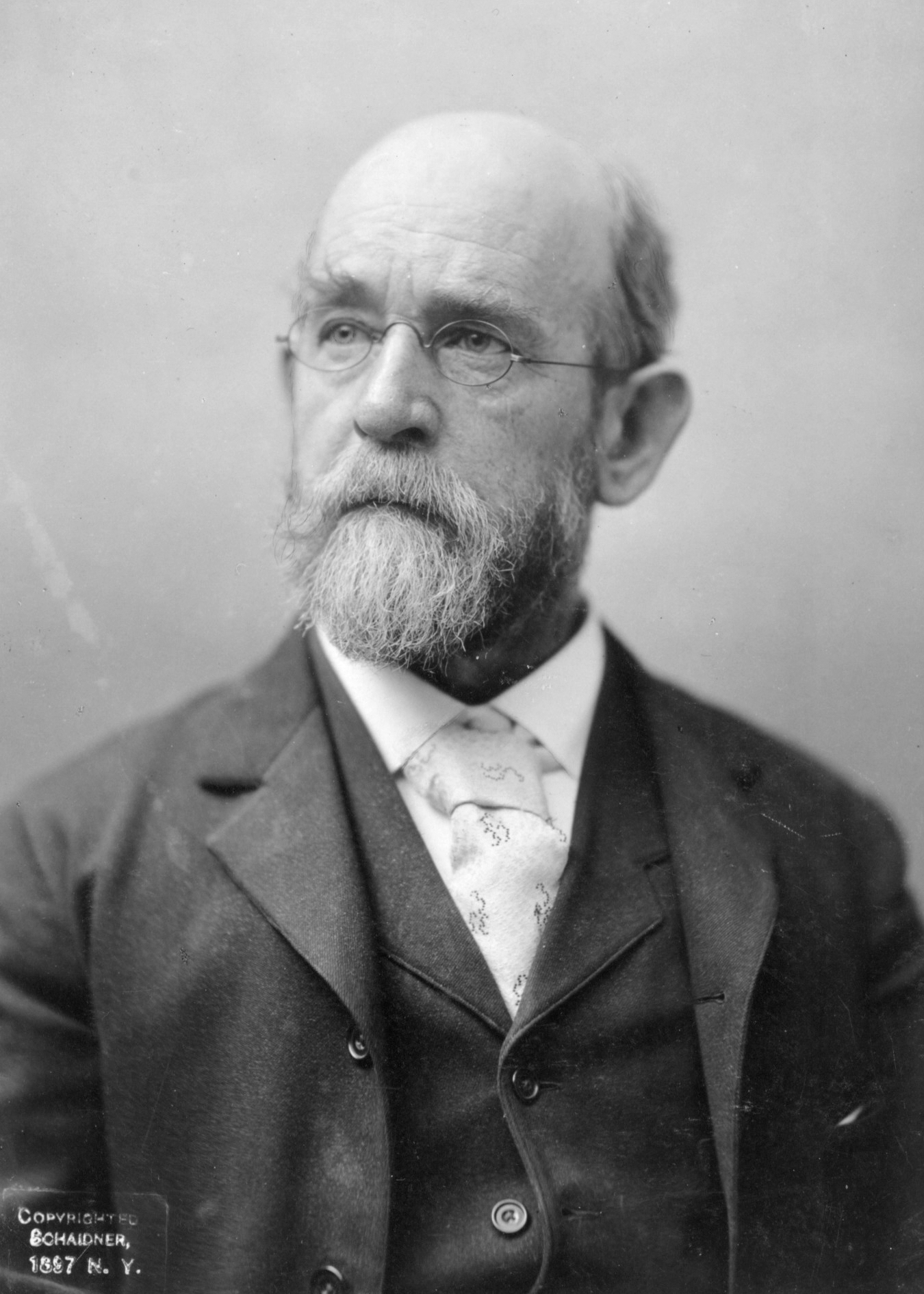
Portrait by Schaidner, 1897

In 1897, George again ran for mayor of New York City, supported again, as he was in 1886, by Charles Frederic Adams. However, he had his fatal stroke during the campaign. His son, Henry Jr., was selected to replace him on the ballot, but he came in a distant fourth.

During George's life, communities in Delaware and Alabama were developed based on his single tax on land and this legacy continued through applications in a number of areas around the world, including Australia, New Zealand and Taiwan.

== Death and funeral ==
George's first stroke occurred in 1890, after a global speaking tour concerning land rights and the relationship between rent and poverty. This stroke greatly weakened him, and he never truly recovered. Despite this, George tried to remain active in politics. Against the advice of his doctors, George campaigned for New York City mayor again in 1897, this time as an Independent Democrat, saying, "I will make the race if I die for it." The strain of the campaign precipitated a second stroke, leading to his death four days before the election.

An estimated 100,000 people visited Grand Central Palace during the day to see Henry George's face, with an estimated equal number crowding outside, unable to enter, and held back by police. After the Palace doors closed, the Reverend Lyman Abbott, Father Edward McGlynn, Rabbi Gustav Gottheil, R. Heber Newton (Episcopalian), and John Sherwin Crosby delivered addresses.

Separate memorial services were held elsewhere. In Chicago, five thousand people lined up to hear memorial addresses by former Illinois governor John Peter Altgeld and John Lancaster Spalding. Mayor Strong broke down and cried at a meeting, calling George a martyr.

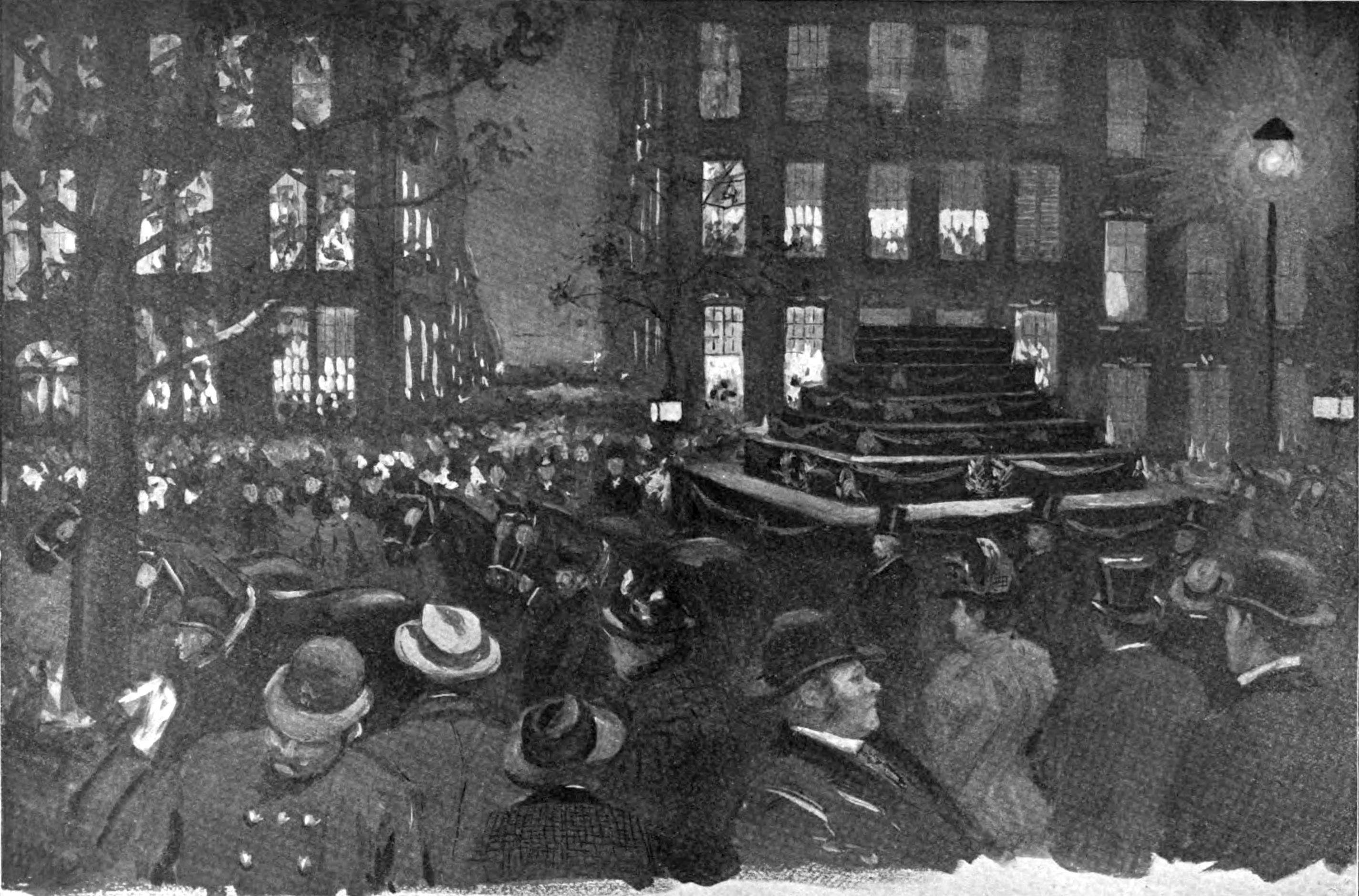
George's funeral procession on Madison Avenue

The New York Times reported that later in the evening, an organized funeral procession of about 2,000 people left from the Grand Central Palace and made its way through Manhattan to the Brooklyn Bridge. This procession was "all the way ... thronged on either side by crowds of silent watchers."

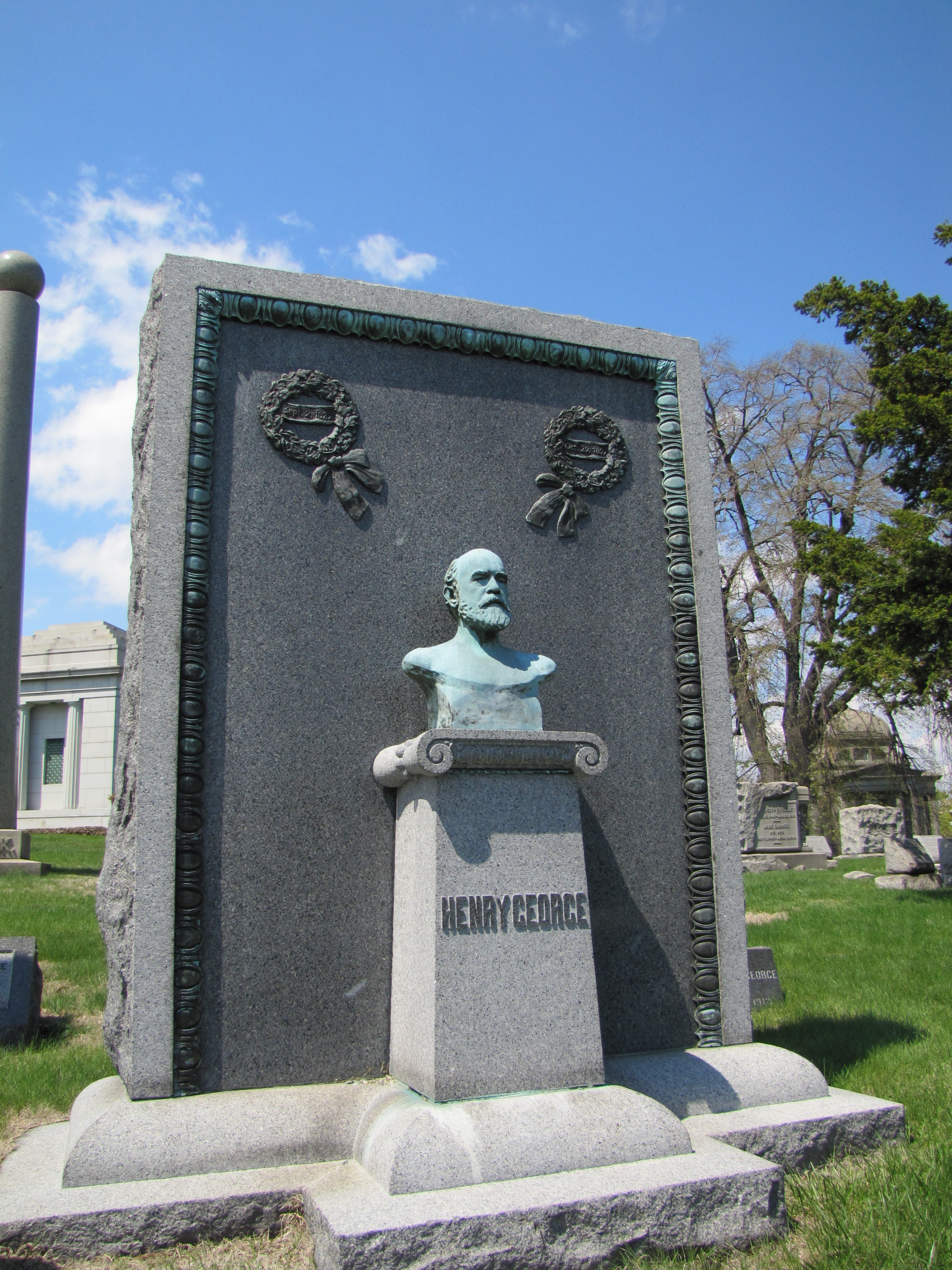
George's grave in Green-Wood Cemetery, Brooklyn, New York

The procession then went on to Brooklyn, where the crowd at Brooklyn City Hall "was the densest ever seen there." There were "thousands on thousands" at City Hall who were so far back that they could not see the funeral procession pass. It was impossible to move on any of the nearby streets. The Times wrote, "Rarely has such an enormous crowd turned out in Brooklyn on any occasion," but that nonetheless, "[t]he slow tolling of the City Hall bell and the regular beating of drums were the only sounds that broke the stillness. ... Anything more impressive ... could not be imagined." At Court Street, the casket was transferred to a hearse and taken to a private funeral at Fort Hamilton.

Commentators disagreed on whether it was the largest funeral in New York history or the largest since the death of Abraham Lincoln. The New York Times reported, "Not even Lincoln had a more glorious death." Even the more conservative New York Sun wrote that, "Since the Civil War, few announcements have been more startling than that of the sudden death of Henry George." Flags were placed at half-staff, even at Tammany Hall, which cancelled its rally for the day.

== Views and policy proposals ==
=== Socialization of land and natural resource rents ===
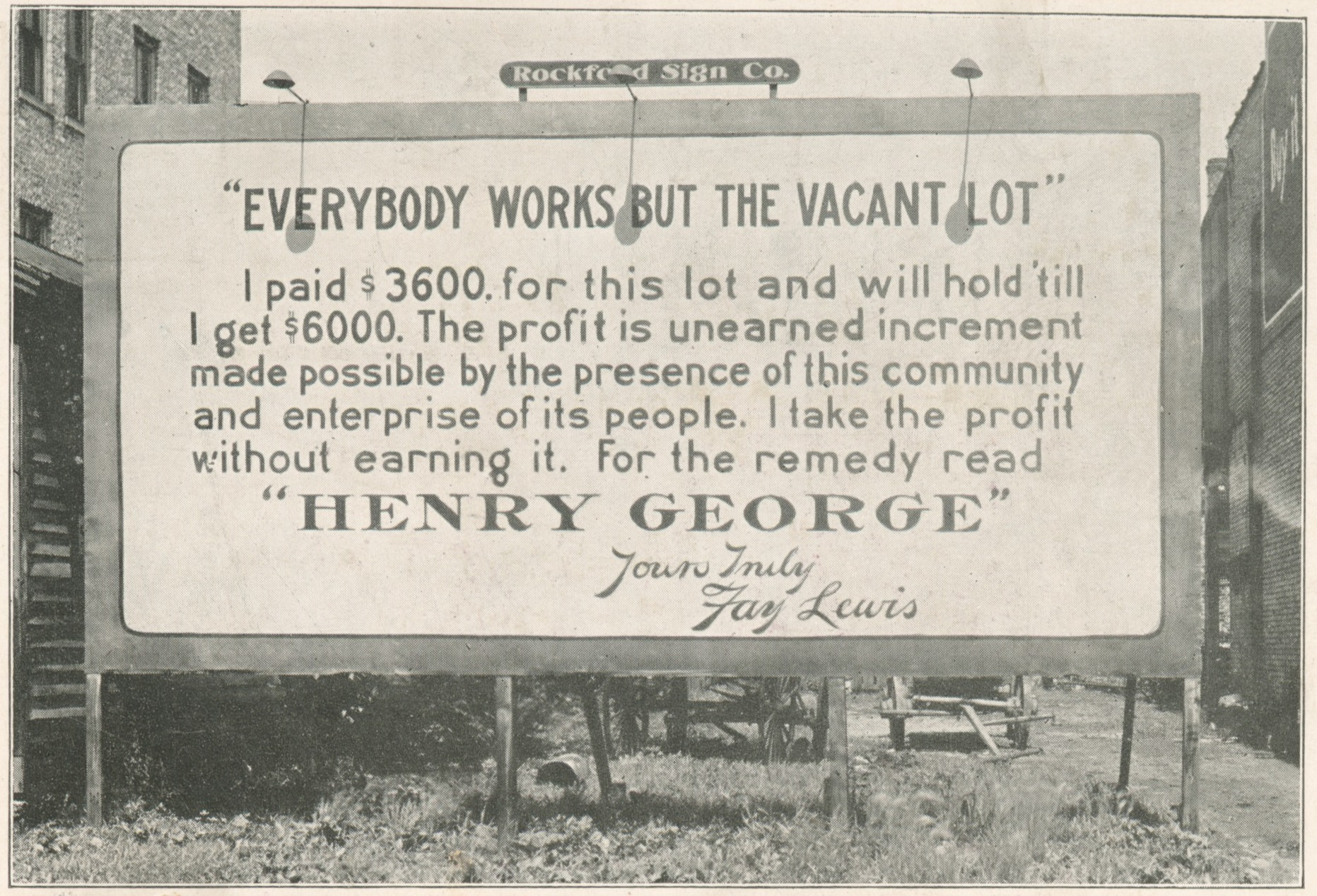
"Everybody works but the vacant lot."

Henry George is best known for his argument that the economic rent of land (location) should be shared by society. The clearest statement of this view is found in Progress and Poverty: "We must make land common property." By taxing land values, society could recapture the value of its common inheritance, raise wages, improve land use, and eliminate the need for taxes on productive activity. George believed it would remove existing incentives toward land speculation and encourage development, as landlords would not suffer tax penalties for any industry or edifice constructed on their land and could not profit by holding valuable sites vacant.

Broadly applying this principle is now commonly known as "Georgism." In George's time, it was known as the "single-tax" movement and sometimes associated with movements for land nationalization, especially in Ireland. However, in Progress and Poverty, George did not favor the idea of nationalization.

I do not propose either to purchase or to confiscate private property in land. The first would be unjust; the second, needless. Let the individuals who now hold it still retain, if they want to, possession of what they are pleased to call their land. Let them continue to call it their land. Let them buy and sell, and bequeath and devise it. We may safely leave them the shell, if we take the kernel. It is not necessary to confiscate land; it is only necessary to confiscate rent.

=== Municipalization of utilities and free public transit ===
George considered businesses relying on exclusive right-of-way land privilege to be "natural" monopolies. Examples of these services included the transportation of utilities (water, electricity, sewage), information (telecommunications), goods, and travelers. George advocated that these systems of transport along "public ways" should usually be managed as public utilities and provided for free or at marginal cost. In some cases, it might be possible to allow competition between private service providers along public "rights of way," such as parcel shipping companies that operate on public roads, but wherever competition would be impossible, George supported complete municipalization. George said that these services would be provided for free because investments in beneficial public goods always tend to increase land values by more than the total cost of those investments. George used the example of urban buildings that provide free vertical transit, paid out of some of the increased value that residents derive from the addition of elevators.

=== Intellectual property reform ===
George was opposed to or suspicious of all intellectual property privilege, because his classical definition of "land" included "all natural forces and opportunities." Therefore, George proposed to abolish or greatly limit intellectual property privilege. In George's view, owning a monopoly over specific arrangements and interactions of materials, governed by the forces of nature, allowed title-holders to extract royalty-rents from producers, in a way similar to owners of ordinary land titles. George later supported limited copyright, on the ground that temporary property over a unique arrangement of words or colors did not in any way prevent others from laboring to make other works of art. George apparently ranked patent rents as a less significant form of monopoly than the owners of land title deeds, partly because he viewed the owners of locations as "the robber that takes all that is left." People could choose not to buy a specific new product, but they cannot choose to lack a place upon which to stand, so benefits gained for labor through lesser reforms would tend to eventually be captured by owners and financiers of location monopoly.

=== Free trade ===
George was opposed to tariffs, which were at the time both the major method of protectionist trade policy and an important source of federal revenue, the federal income tax having not yet been introduced. He argued that tariffs kept prices high for consumers, while failing to produce any increase in overall wages. He also believed that tariffs protected monopolistic companies from competition, thus augmenting their power. Free trade became a major issue in federal politics and his book Protection or Free Trade was the first book to be read entirely into the Congressional Record. It was read by five Democratic congressmen.

In 1997, Spencer MacCallum wrote that Henry George was "undeniably the greatest writer and orator on free trade who ever lived."

In 2009, Tyler Cowen wrote that George's 1886 book Protection or Free Trade "remains perhaps the best-argued tract on free trade to this day."

Jim Powell said that Protection or Free Trade was probably the best book on trade written by anyone in the Americas, comparing it to Adam Smith's Wealth of Nations. Milton Friedman said it was the most rhetorically brilliant work ever written on trade. Friedman also paraphrased one of George's arguments in favor of free trade: "It's a very interesting thing that in times of war, we blockade our enemies in order to prevent them from getting goods from us. In time of peace we do to ourselves by tariffs what we do to our enemy in time of war."

=== Secret ballot ===
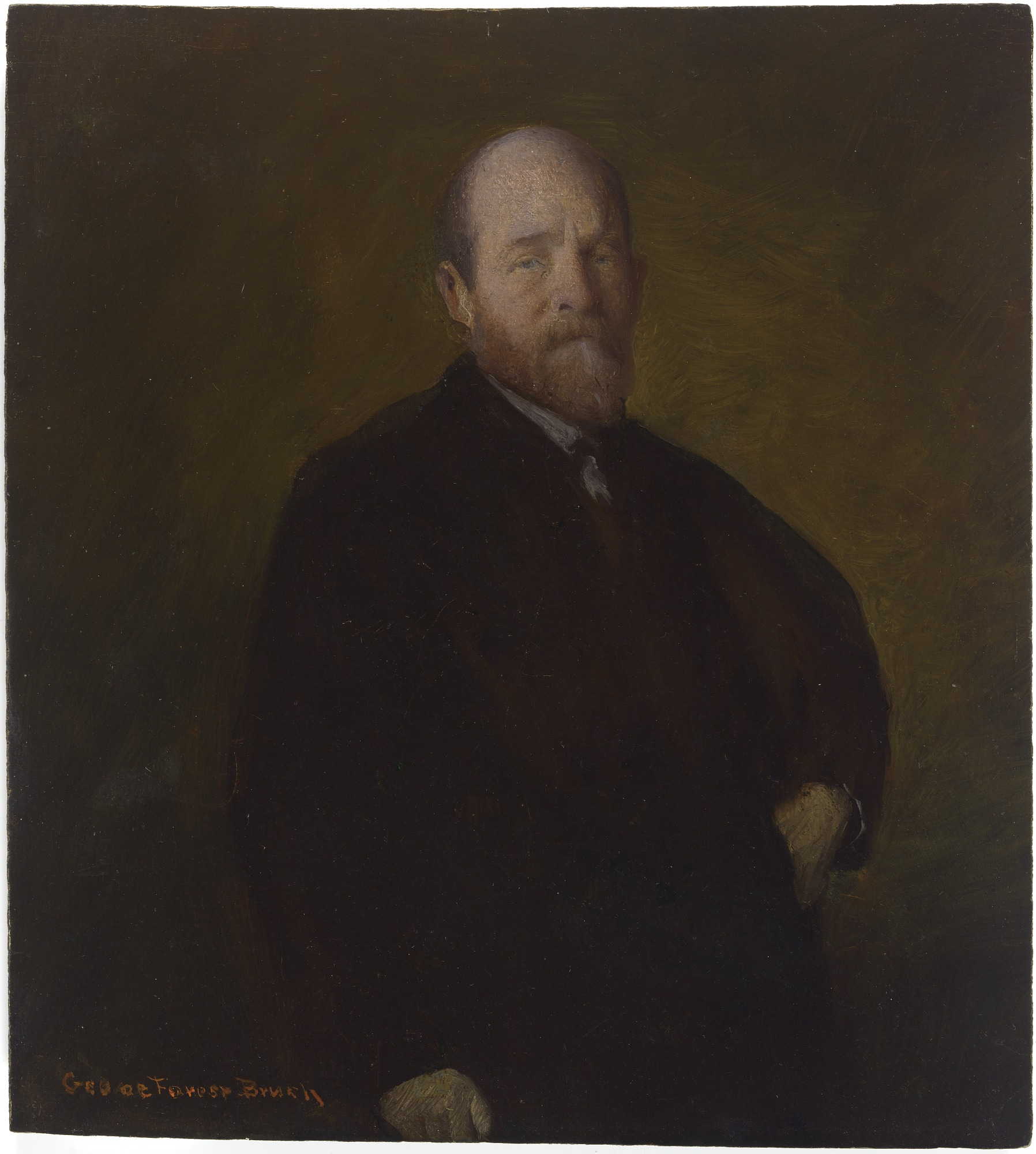
Artist: George de Forest Brush, Sitter: Henry George, Date: 1888

George was one of the earliest and most prominent advocates of the secret ballot in the United States. Harvard historian Jill Lepore asserts that Henry George's advocacy is the reason Americans vote with secret ballots today. George's first article in support of the secret ballot was entitled "Bribery in Elections" and was published in the Overland Review of December 1871. His second article was "Money in Elections," published in the North American Review of March 1883. The first secret ballot reform approved by a state legislature was brought about by reformers who said they were influenced by George. The first state to adopt the secret ballot, also called The Australian Ballot, was Massachusetts in 1888 under the leadership of Richard Henry Dana III. By 1891, more than half the states had adopted it too.

=== Money creation, banking, and national deficit reform ===
George supported the use of "debt free" (sovereign money) currency, such as the greenback, which governments would spend into circulation to help finance public spending through the capture of seigniorage rents. He opposed the use of metallic currency, such as gold or silver, and fiat money created by private commercial banks.

=== Citizen's dividend and universal pension ===
George advocated a citizen's dividend paid for by a land value tax in an April 1885 speech at a Knights of Labor local in Burlington, Iowa titled "The Crime of Poverty", and later in an interview with former U.S. House Representative David Dudley Field II from New York's 7th congressional district published in the July 1885 edition of the North American Review:

As an English friend of mine puts it: No taxes and a pension for everybody; and why should it not be? To take land values for public purposes is not really to impose a tax, but to take for public purposes a value created by the community. And out of the fund which would thus accrue from the common property, we might, without degradation to anybody, provide enough to actually secure from want all who were deprived of their natural protectors or met with accident, or any man who should grow so old that he could not work. All prating that is heard from some quarters about its hurting the common people to give them what they do not work for is humbug. The truth is, that anything that injures self-respect, degrades, does harm; but if you give it as a right, as something to which every citizen is entitled to, it does not degrade. Charity schools do degrade children that are sent to them, but public schools do not.

George proposed to create a pension and disability system, and an unconditional basic income from surplus land rents. It would be distributed to residents "as a right" instead of as charity. Georgists often refer to this policy as a citizen's dividend in reference to a similar proposal by Thomas Paine.

=== Bankruptcy protection and an abolition of debtors' prisons ===
George noted that most debt, though bearing the appearance of genuine capital interest, was not issued for the purpose of creating true capital, but instead as an obligation against rental flows from existing economic privilege. George therefore reasoned that the state should not provide aid to creditors in the form of sheriffs, constables, courts, and prisons to enforce collection on these illegitimate obligations. George did not provide any data to support this view, but in today's developed economies, much of the supply of credit is created to purchase claims on future land rents, rather than to finance the creation of true capital. Michael Hudson and Adair Turner estimate that about 80 percent of credit finances real estate purchases, mostly land.

George acknowledged that this policy would limit the banking system but believed that would actually be an economic boon, since the financial sector, in its existing form, was mostly augmenting rent extraction, as opposed to productive investment. "The curse of credit," George wrote, was "... that it expands when there is a tendency to speculation, and sharply contracts just when most needed to assure confidence and prevent industrial waste." George even said that a debt jubilee could remove the accumulation of burdensome obligations without reducing aggregate wealth.

=== Women's suffrage ===
George was an important and vocal advocate of women's political rights. He argued for extending suffrage to women. George wrote, "The cause of woman suffrage is steadily, though slowly and quietly making progress in public opinion. In a large and ever widening circle the women who want to vote are no longer deemed masculine nor the men who would have them vote, effeminate. The goal has not been reached and may yet be far off, but since the first woman's rights convention was held in the United States forty years ago, great advances have been made.."

=== Other proposals ===
George also advocated for reforms based on changing taxation around land values. In Progress and Poverty, he argued that increases in land value stem largely from social and economic development rather than individual effort, and therefore could be used as a main source of public revenue. He argued that taxing land values would discourage speculative holding of unused land and promote more efficient land use, while allowing the reduction of taxes on labor and capital. George believed that shifting taxation away from productive activity would encourage economic growth and reduce inequality. Later explanations of his work have shown that he identified economic rent as a source of inefficiency in markets, and that taxing unearned income from land could improve incentives without reducing production. He also linked monopoly power to the concentration of economic rent, arguing that control over land and natural resources allowed individuals to benefit from social development without contributing to production.

Henry George also proposed and advocated the following reforms:

- Dramatic reductions in the size of the military.
- Replacement of contract patronage with the direct employment of government workers, with civil-service protections.
- Building and maintenance of free libraries.
- Campaign finance reform and political spending restrictions.
- Careful regulation of all monopolies. George advocated regulations to eliminate monopolies when possible and government ownership of monopolies as a policy of last resort.

== Legacy ==
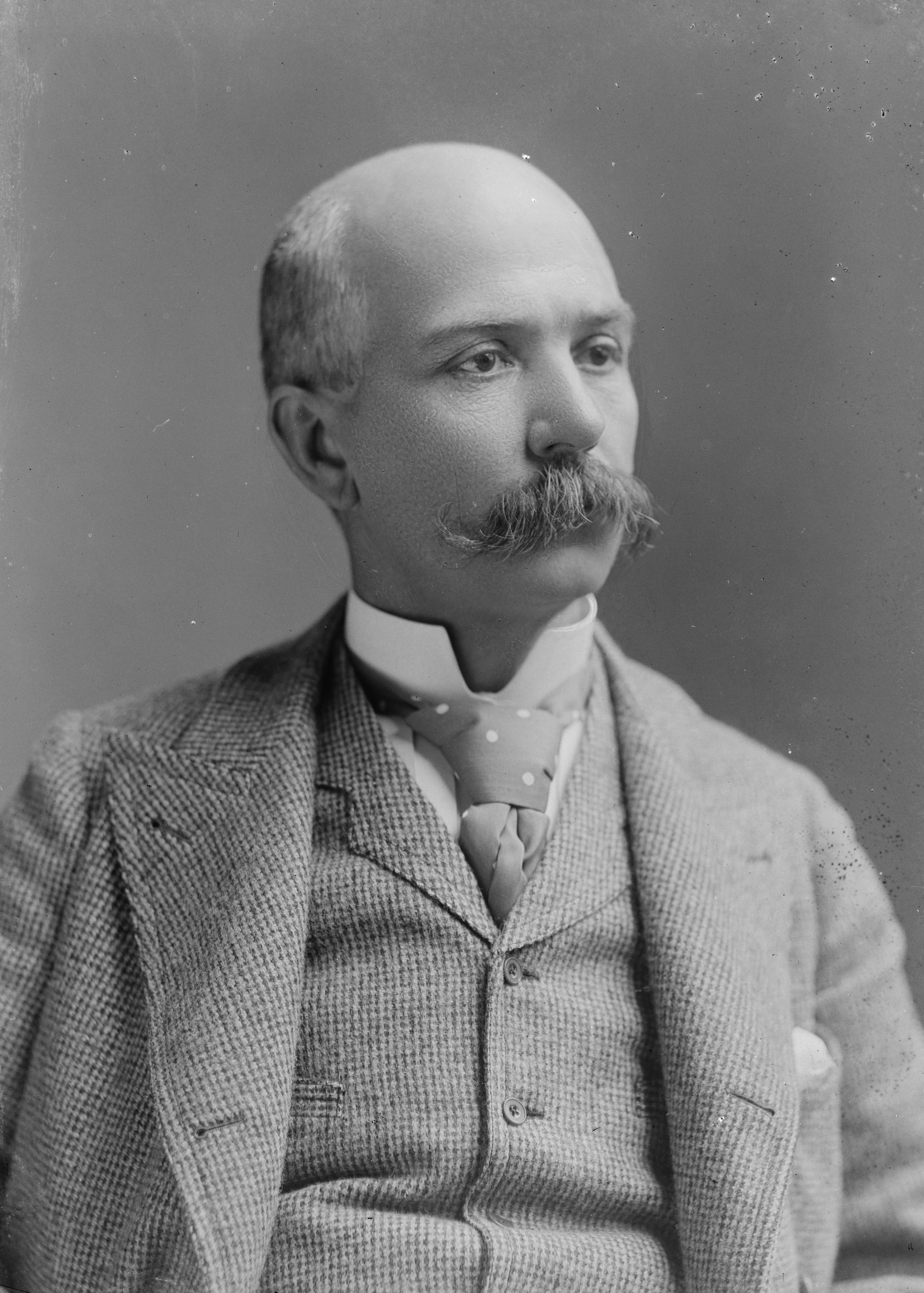
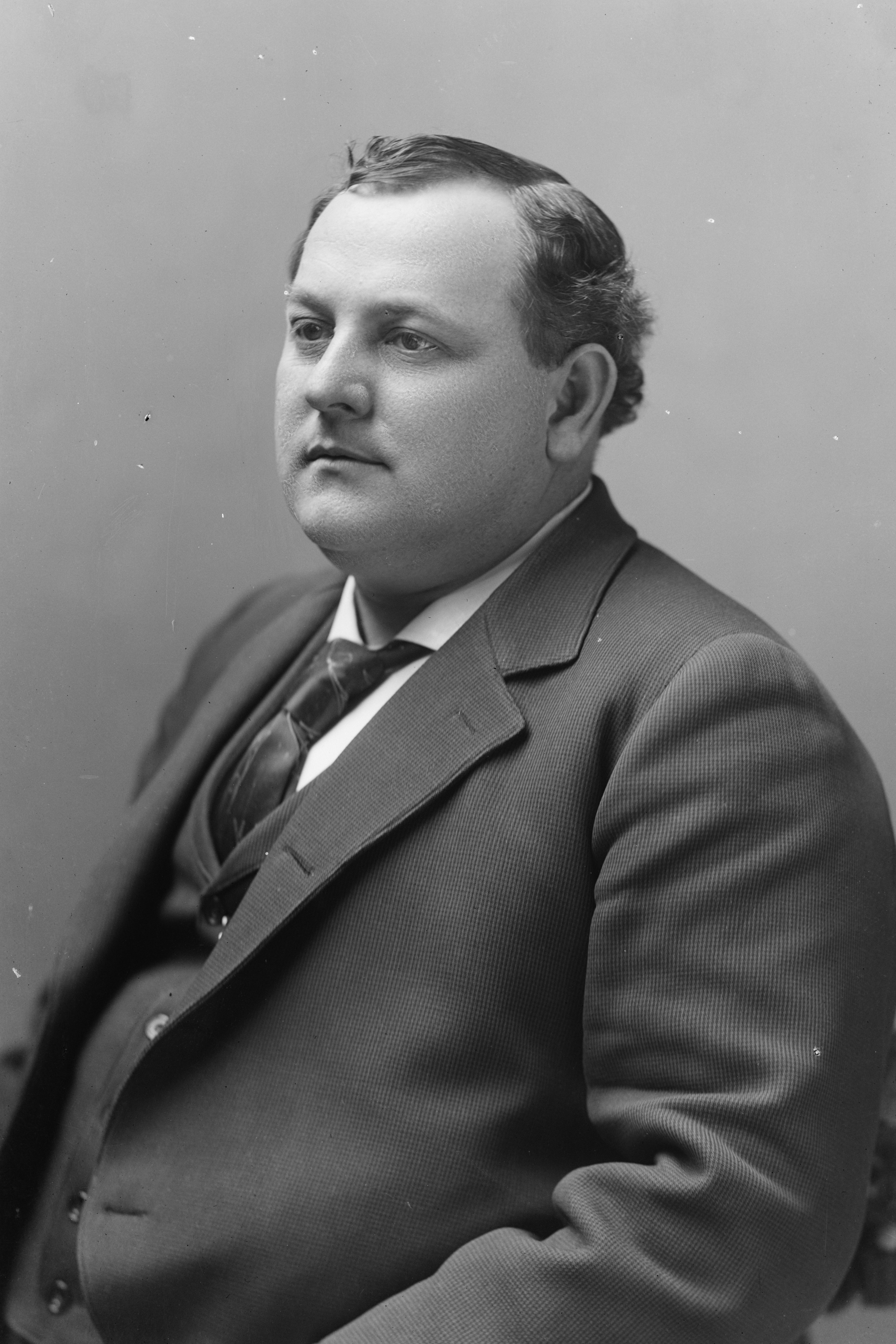
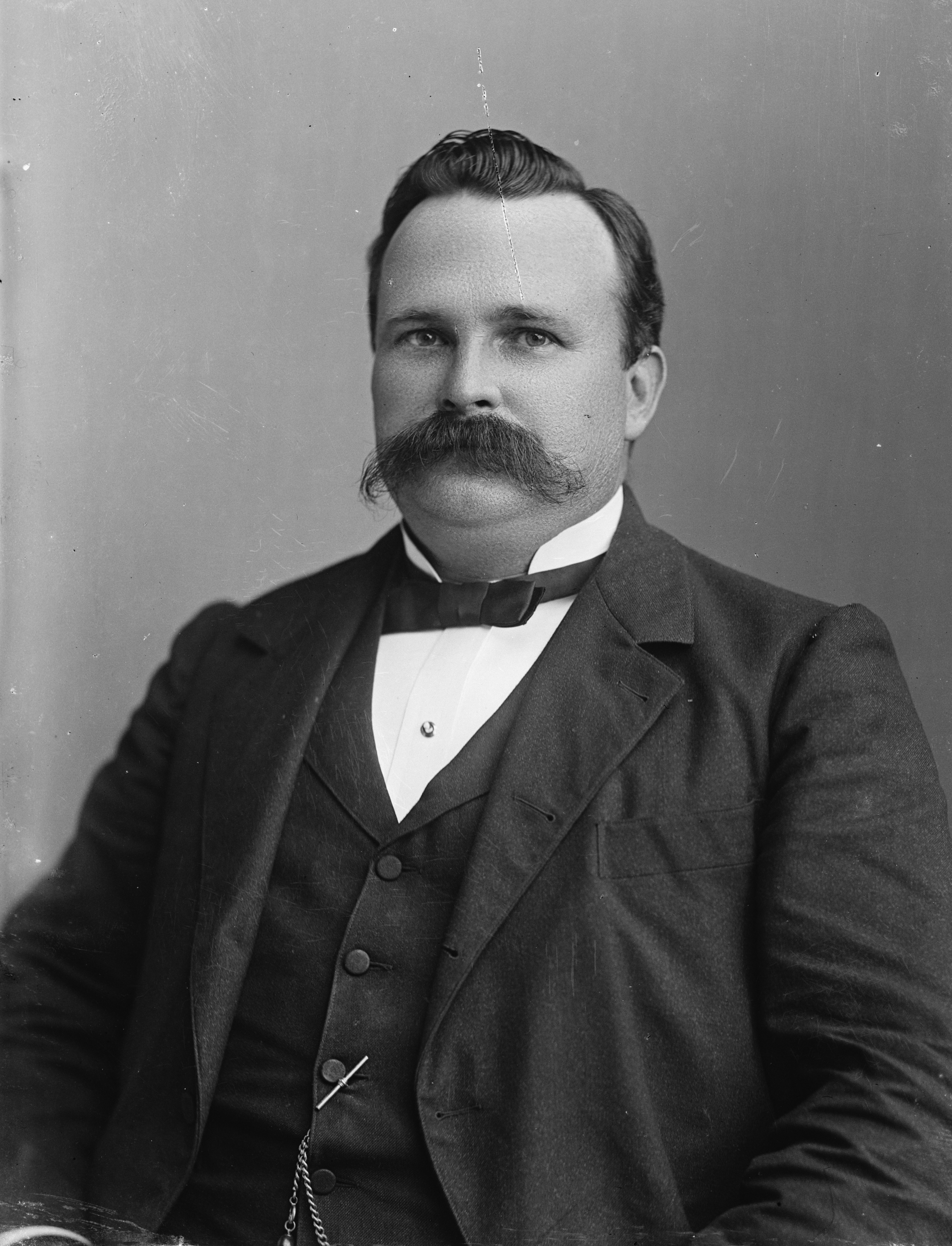
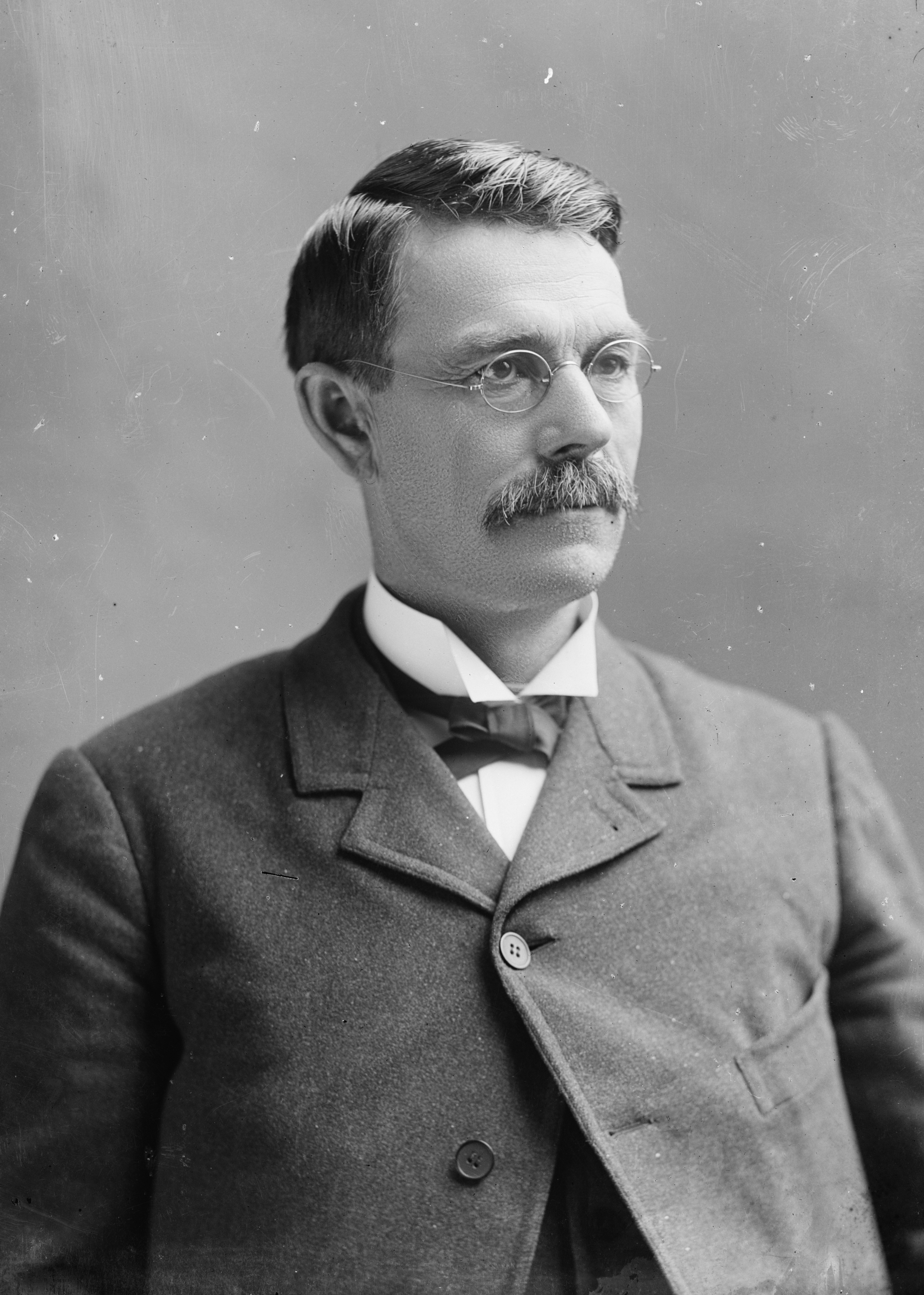
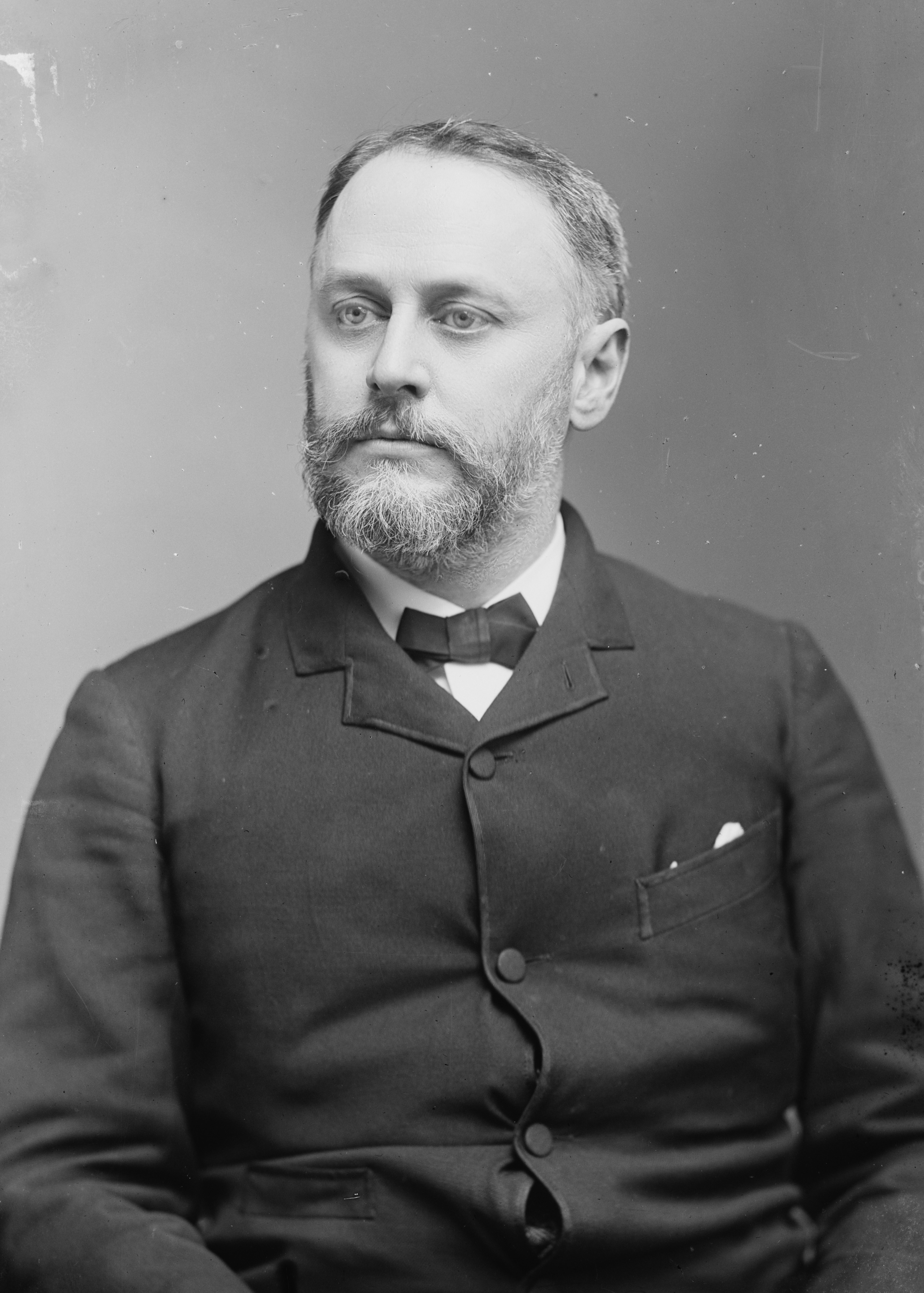
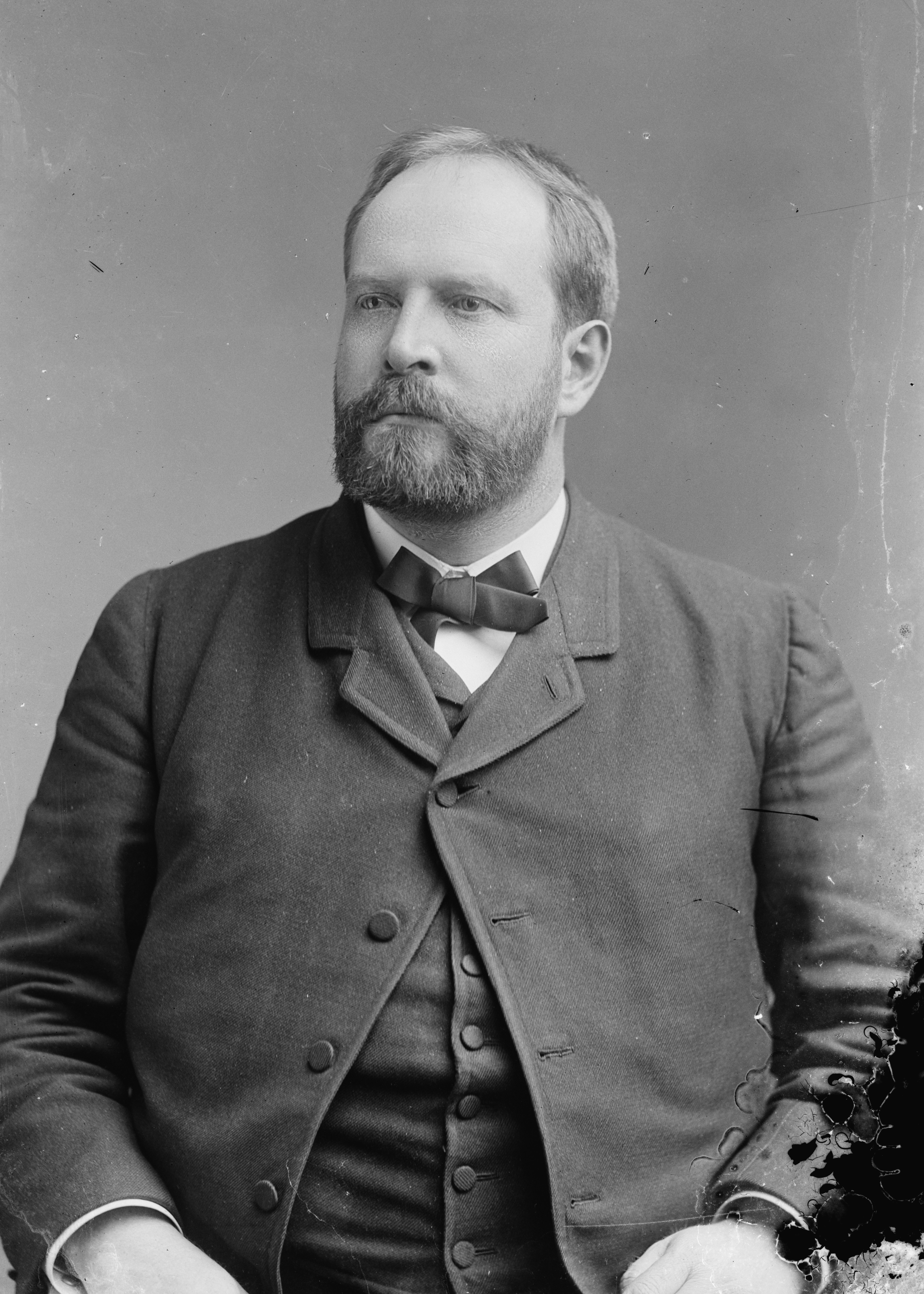
In 1894, six congressmen representing four states voted in favor of a single tax amendment to the Wilson–Gorman Tariff Act. They were, clockwise from top left:
Michael D. Harter of Ohio, Tom L. Johnson of Ohio, James G. Maguire of California, J. De Witt Warner of New York, Charles Tracey of New York, and Jerry Simpson of Kansas.

Henry George's ideas on politics and economics had enormous influence in his time. His ideas gave rise to the economic philosophy now known as Georgism. However, his influence slowly waned through the 20th century. Nonetheless, it would be difficult to overstate George's impact on turn-of-the-century reform movements and intellectual culture. George's self-published Progress and Poverty was the first popular economics text and one of the most widely printed books ever written. The book's explosive worldwide popularity is often marked as the beginning of the Progressive Era and various political parties, clubs, and charitable organizations around the world were founded on George's ideas. George's message attracts support widely across the political spectrum, including labor union activists, socialists, anarchists, libertarians, reformers, conservatives, and wealthy investors. As a result, Henry George is still claimed as a primary intellectual influence by both classical liberals and socialists. Edwin Markham expressed a common sentiment when he said, "Henry George has always been to me one of the supreme heroes of humanity."

A large number of famous individuals, particularly Progressive Era figures, claim inspiration from Henry George's ideas. John Peter Altgeld wrote that George "made almost as great an impression on the economic thought of the age as Darwin did on the world of science." José Martí wrote, "Only Darwin in the natural sciences has made a mark comparable to George's on social science." In 1892, Alfred Russel Wallace stated that George's Progress and Poverty was "undoubtedly the most remarkable and important book of the present century," implicitly placing it above even The Origin of Species, which he had earlier helped develop and publicize.

Franklin D. Roosevelt praised George as "one of the really great thinkers produced by our country" and bemoaned the fact that George's writings were not better known and understood. George's views influenced the New Deal.

In 1897, William Jennings Bryan wrote that George's genius had reached and affected the global reading public, and that he "was one of the foremost thinkers of the world." Former President Rutherford B. Hayes said of him:

Henry George is strong when he portrays the rottenness of the present system. We are, to say the least, not yet ready for his remedy. We may reach and remove the difficulty by changes in the laws regulating corporations, descents of property, wills, trusts, taxation, and a host of other important interests, not omitting lands and other property.

John Dewey wrote, "It would require less than the fingers of the two hands to enumerate those who from Plato down rank with him," and that "No man, no graduate of a higher educational institution, has a right to regard himself as an educated man in social thought unless he has some first-hand acquaintance with the theoretical contribution of this great American thinker." Albert Jay Nock wrote that anyone who rediscovers Henry George will find that "George was one of the first half-dozen [greatest] minds of the nineteenth century, in all the world." The anti-war activist John Haynes Holmes echoed that sentiment by commenting that George was "one of the half-dozen great Americans of the nineteenth century, and one of the outstanding social reformers of all time." Edward McGlynn said, "[George] is one of the greatest geniuses that the world has ever seen, and ... the qualities of his heart fully equal the magnificent gifts of his intellect. ... He is a man who could have towered above all his equals in almost any line of literary or scientific pursuit." Likewise, Leo Tolstoy wrote that George was "one of the greatest men of the 19th century."

The social scientist and economist John A. Hobson observed in 1897 that "Henry George may be considered to have exercised a more directly powerful formative and educative influence over English radicalism of the last fifteen years than any other man," and that George "was able to drive an abstract notion, that of economic rent, into the minds of a large number of 'practical' men, and so generate therefrom a social movement. George had all the popular gifts of the American orator and journalist, with something more. Sincerity rang out of every utterance." Many others agree with Hobson. George Bernard Shaw, who created socialist organizations such as the Fabian Society, claims that Henry George was responsible for inspiring 5 out of 6 socialist reformers in Britain during the 1880s. The controversial People's Budget and the Land Values (Scotland) Bill were inspired by Henry George and resulted in a constitutional crisis and the Parliament Act 1911 to reform of the House of Lords, which had blocked the land reform. In Denmark, the Danmarks Retsforbund, known in English as the Justice Party or Single-Tax Party, was founded in 1919. The party's platform is based upon the land tax principles of Henry George. The party was elected to parliament for the first time in 1926, and they were moderately successful in the post-war period and managed to join a governing coalition with the Social Democrats and the Social Liberal Party from the years 1957–60, with diminishing success afterwards.

Non-political means have also been attempted to further the cause. A number of "Single Tax Colonies" were started, such as Arden, Delaware and Fairhope, Alabama. In 1904, Lizzie Magie created a board game called The Landlord's Game to demonstrate George's theories. This was later turned into the popular board game Monopoly.

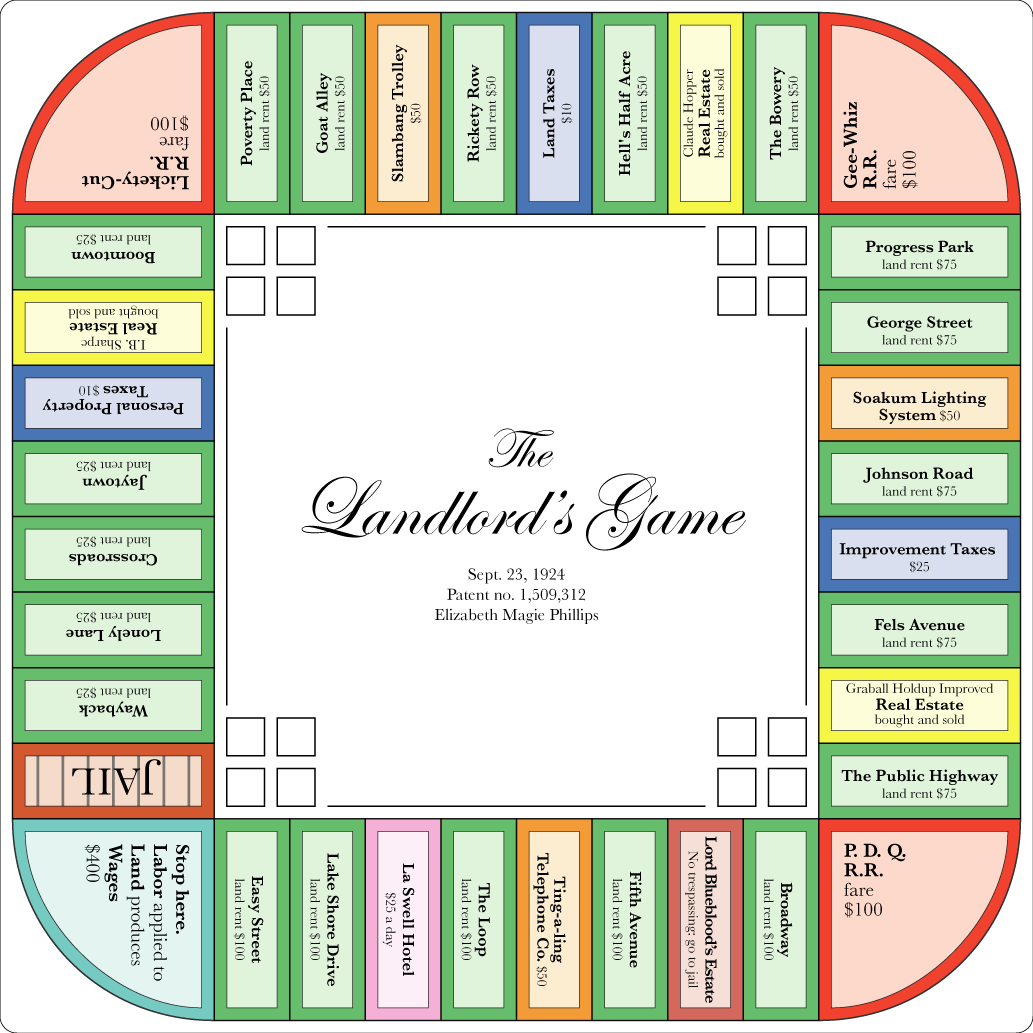
Landlords Game board, based on Lizzie Magie's 1924 US patent (no. 1,509,312).

Joseph Jay "J.J." Pastoriza led a successful Georgist movement in Houston. Though the Georgist club, the Houston Single Tax League, started there in 1890, Pastoriza lent use of his property to the league in 1903. He retired from the printing business in 1906 in order to dedicate his life to public service, then traveled the United States and Europe while studying various systems of taxing property. He returned to Houston and served as Houston Tax Commissioner from 1911 through 1917. He introduced his "Houston Plan of Taxation" in 1912: improvements to land and merchants' inventories were taxed at 25 percent of appraised value, unimproved land was taxed at 70 percent of appraisal, and personal property was exempt. However, in 1915, two courts ruled that the Houston Plan violated the Texas Constitution.

Before reading Progress and Poverty, Helen Keller was a socialist who believed that Georgism was a good step in the right direction. She later wrote of finding "in Henry George's philosophy a rare beauty and power of inspiration, and a splendid faith in the essential nobility of human nature." Some speculate that the passion, sincerity, clear explanations evident in Henry George's writing account for the almost religious passion that many believers in George's theories exhibit, and that the promised possibility of creating heaven on Earth filled a spiritual void during an era of secularization. Josiah Wedgwood, the Liberal and later Labour Party politician wrote that ever since reading Henry George's work, "I have known 'that there was a man from God, and his name was Henry George.' I had no need hence-forth for any other faith."

Although both advocated worker's rights, Henry George and Karl Marx were antagonists. Marx saw the Single Tax platform as a step backwards from the transition to communism. On his part, Henry George predicted that the forced introduction of socialism "would, if carried to full expression, mean Egyptian despotism." Leo Tolstoy deplored that a silence had fallen around George, for he viewed Georgism as reasonable and realistic, as opposed to other utopian movements, and as a "contribution to the enlightenment of the consciousness of mankind, placed on a practical footing," and that it could help do away with what he called the Slavery of Our Times." Upon Marx's death, George admitted he has not read any of his works, which were untranslated into English at the time, but described him as a man who "so steadfastly, so patiently, and so self-sacrificingly labored for the freedom of the oppressed and the elevation of the downtrodden".

Henry George's popularity waned gradually during the 20th century. However, there are still Georgist organizations. Many influential people who remain famous, such as George Bernard Shaw, were inspired by George or identify as Georgists. In his last book, Where do we go from here: Chaos or Community?, Martin Luther King Jr. referred to Henry George in support of a guaranteed minimum income. Bill Moyers quoted Henry George in a speech and identified George as a "great personal hero." Albert Einstein wrote that "Men like Henry George are rare unfortunately. One cannot imagine a more beautiful combination of intellectual keenness, artistic form and fervent love of justice. Every line is written as if for our generation. The spreading of these works is a really deserving cause, for our generation especially has many and important things to learn from Henry George."

Mason Gaffney, an American economist and a major Georgist critic of neoclassical economics, argued that neoclassical economics was designed and promoted by landowners and their hired economists to divert attention from George's extremely popular philosophy that since land and resources are provided by nature, and their value is given by society, land value – rather than labor or capital – should provide the tax base to fund government and its expenditures.

British MP, Andrew MacLaren believed George's ideas of land taxation would bring about economic justice and argued in favour of them in the House of Commons. Together with his son Leon MacLaren he founded the School of Economic Science, a global organisation teaching Georgist principles.

Joseph Stiglitz wrote that "One of the most important but underappreciated ideas in economics is the Henry George principle of taxing the economic rent of land, and more generally, natural resources." Stiglitz also claims that we now know land value tax "is even better than Henry George thought."

The Robert Schalkenbach Foundation publishes copies of George's works and related texts on economic reform and sponsors academic research into his policy proposals. The Lincoln Institute of Land Policy was founded to promote the ideas of Henry George but now focuses more generally on land economics and policy. The Henry George School of Social Science of New York and its satellite schools teach classes and conduct outreach.

=== Henry George theorem ===
In 1977, Joseph Stiglitz showed that under certain conditions, spending by the government on public goods will increase aggregate land rents by at least an equal amount. This result has been dubbed by economists the Henry George theorem, as it characterizes a situation where Henry George's "single tax" is not only efficient, but also the only tax necessary to finance public expenditures.

== Economic contributions ==
George reconciled the issues of efficiency and equity, showing that both could be satisfied under a system in harmony with natural law. He showed that David Ricardo's Law of Rent applied not just to an agricultural economy, but even more so to urban economics. And he showed that there is no inherent conflict between labor and capital provided one maintained a clear distinction between classical factors of production, capital and land.

George developed what he saw as a crucial feature of his own theory of economics in a critique of an illustration used by Frédéric Bastiat in order to explain the nature of interest and profit. Bastiat had asked his readers to consider James and William, both carpenters. James has a plane and has lent it to William for a year. Would James be satisfied with the return of an equally good plane a year later? Surely not! He'd expect a board along with it, as interest. In accordance with the theory of reason for interest, Bastiat said that James had given William over that year "the power, inherent in the instrument, to increase the productivity of his labor," and deserves compensation for that increased productivity.

George did not accept this explanation. He wrote, "I am inclined to think that if all wealth consisted of such things as planes, and all production was such as that of carpenters – that is to say, if wealth consisted but of the inert matter of the universe, and production of working up this inert matter into different shapes – that interest would be but the robbery of industry, and could not long exist."

George's theory had its share of critiques. Austrian school economist Eugen von Böhm-Bawerk, for example, expressed a negative judgment of George's discussion of the carpenter's plane. In his treatise, Capital and Interest, he wrote:

(T)he separation of production into two groups, in one of which the vital forces of nature form a distinct element in addition to labour, while in the other they do not, is entirely untenable... The natural sciences have long ago told us that the cooperation of nature is universal. ... The muscular movement of the man who planes would be of very little use, if the natural powers and properties of the steel edge of the plane did not come to his assistance.

Later, George argued that the role of time in production is pervasive. In The Science of Political Economy, he writes:

[I]f I go to a builder and say to him, "In what time and at what price will you build me such and such a house?" he would, after thinking, name a time, and a price based on it. This specification of time would be essential. ... This I would soon find if, not quarreling with the price, I ask him largely to lessen the time. ... I might get the builder somewhat to lessen the time ... ; but only by greatly increasing the price, until finally a point would be reached where he would not consent to build the house in less time no matter at what price. He would say [that the house just could not be built any faster]. ... The importance ... of this principle – that all production of wealth requires time as well as labor – we shall see later on; but the principle that time is a necessary element in all production we must take into account from the very first.

According to Oscar B. Johannsen, "Since the very basis of the Austrian concept of value is subjective, it is apparent that George's understanding of value paralleled theirs. However, he either did not understand or did not appreciate the importance of marginal utility." On the contrary, George explicitly used marginal utility in his analyses of both the 'margin of production' in macroeconomics and microeconomic decision theory.

Another spirited response came from British biologist T. H. Huxley in his article "Capital – the Mother of Labour," published in 1890 in the journal The Nineteenth Century. Huxley used the scientific principles of energy to undermine George's theory, arguing that, energetically speaking, labor is unproductive.

George's writings were also a major influence on Sun Yat-sen's program for modernizing China's economy. Chiang Kai-shek and Soong Mei-ling praised George's economic writings in the 1940s, well after the writings were no longer a major topic in the United States.

== Works ==
- Our Land and Land Policy 1871
- Progress and Poverty 1879 (unabridged text)
- The Irish Land Question 1881
- Social Problems 1883
- "The New Party". The North American Review. 145 (368): 1–8. July 1887. ISBN 085315726X.
- Protection or Free Trade 1886 unabridged text (1905), alternate
- The Standard, New York 1887 to 1890 A weekly periodical started and usually edited by Henry George.
- The Condition of Labor: an Open Letter to Pope Leo XIII; with Encyclopedical Letter of Pope Leo XIII, on the Condition of Labor 1891 (unabridged text)
- A Perplexed Philosopher 1892
- The Land Question: Property in Land 1893
- Shortest Road to the Single Tax 1893
- The Science of Political Economy (unfinished) 1898

== See also ==
- Charles Hall – An early precursor to Henry George
- Silvio Gesell – An economist influenced by Henry George
- History of Monopoly
- Freiwirtschaft
- New York City mayoral elections
