= Peggy George =

American actress (c.1908–1978)

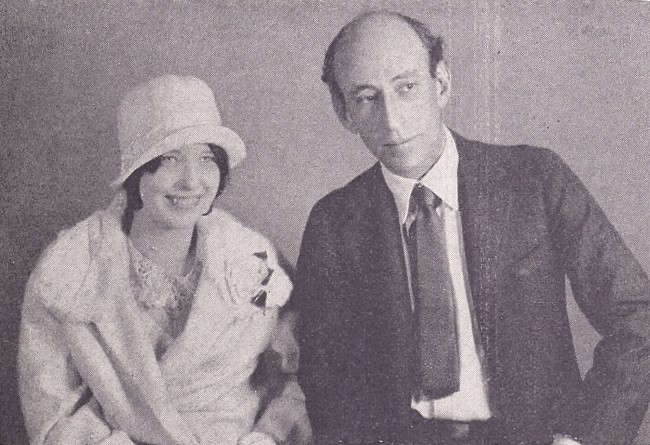
- Peggy George with her father William C. deMille in 1925
- Born: Margaret George de Mille circa 1908; New York City, New York, U.S.
- Died: April 6, 1978 (aged 69–70)
- Occupation: Actress
- Spouses: B. P. Fineman (m. 1930; div. 1937) Richard Alan Miller (m. 1942)
- Children: 1
- Parents: William C. deMille; Anna George de Mille
- Relatives: Agnes de Mille (sister); Henry George (grandfather); Henry Churchill de Mille (grandfather); Matilda Beatrice deMille (grandmother); Cecil B. DeMille (uncle); Katherine DeMille (cousin); Richard de Mille (cousin)

Peggy George (born Margaret George de Mille; c. 1908 – 1978) was an American film actress from the silent movie era.

== Biography ==
She was the daughter of William C. de Mille and Anna Angela George, whose father was notable economist Henry George. Her older sister was choreographer Agnes de Mille. Her father, William, was the older brother of noted film director Cecil B. DeMille.

George married producer B. P. Fineman on September 10, 1930. The couple had one daughter, named Judith, and divorced in 1937. Subsequently, she was married to one Richard Miller. She died in 1978.

As a member of the DeMille family of presumed interest to the tabloids, Peggy George is name-dropped in the 1931 film Five Star Final.

== Filmography ==
- The Heart of Nora Flynn (1916)
