= Protection or Free Trade =

1886 book by Henry George

Protection or Free Trade: An Examination of the Tariff Question, with especial Regard to the Interests of Labor
- Title page for Protection or Free Trade: An Examination of the Tariff Question, with especial Regard to the Interests of Labor (1886 UK edition)
- Author: Henry George
- Language: English
- Subjects: Trade, free trade, protectionism, tariff, capitalism, socialism, Georgism, tax policy, land, economic rent
- Publication date: 1886
- Publication place: United States
- Media type: Print (Hardback)
- Pages: 360
- Text: Protection or Free Trade: An Examination of the Tariff Question, with especial Regard to the Interests of Labor at Wikisource

Protection or Free Trade is an 1886 book published by the economist and social philosopher, Henry George. Its sub-title is An Examination of the Tariff Question with Especial Regard to the Interests of Labor. As the title suggests, George examined the debate between protectionism and free trade.

George was opposed to tariffs, which were at the time both the major method of protectionist trade policy and an important source of federal revenue. He argued that tariffs kept prices high for consumers, while failing to produce any increase in overall wages. He also believed that tariffs protected monopolistic companies from competition, thus augmenting their power. Like Progress and Poverty, much of the book was devoted to attacking privileges, such as land monopoly, which limit trade and rob value from producers.

Largely as a result of this book, free trade became a major issue in federal politics. Protection or Free Trade was the first book to be read entirely into the Congressional Record. It was read aloud by five Democratic congressmen.

== "True free trade" ==
George defended what he considered "true free trade". For him, this required free trade to be coupled with the treatment of land as common property:

Free trade means free production. Now fully to free production it is necessary not only to remove all taxes on production, but also to remove all other restrictions on production. True free trade, in short, requires that the active factor of production, Labor, shall have free access to the passive factor of production, Land. To secure this all monopoly of land must be broken up, and the equal right of all to the use of the natural elements must be secured by the treatment of the land as the common property in usufruct of the whole people.

== Acclaim ==
In 1997, Spencer MacCallum wrote that Henry George was "undeniably the greatest writer and orator on free trade who ever lived."

In 2009, Tyler Cowen wrote that George's 1886 book Protection or Free Trade "remains perhaps the best-argued tract on free trade to this day."

Jim Powell said that Protection or Free Trade was probably the best book on trade written by anyone in the Americas, comparing it Adam Smith's Wealth of Nations.

Milton Friedman said it was the most rhetorically brilliant work ever written on trade. Friedman also paraphrased one of George's arguments in favor of free trade: "It’s a very interesting thing that in times of war, we blockade our enemies in order to prevent them from getting goods from us. In time of peace we do to ourselves by tariffs what we do to our enemy in time of war.”

Oswald Garrison Villard said, "Few men made more stirring and valuable contributions to the economic life of modern America than did Henry George," and that what George had "written about protection and free trade is as fresh and as valuable today as it was at the hour in which it was penned."

== Table of contents ==
The table of contents are as follows:

- Chapter 1 – Introductory
- Chapter 2 – Clearing Ground
- Chapter 3 - Of Method
- Chapter 4 – Protection as a Universal Need
- Chapter 5 - The Protective Unit
- Chapter 6 – Trade
- Chapter 7 – Production and Producers
- Chapter 8 – Tariffs for Revenue
- Chapter 9 – Tariffs for Protection
- Chapter 10 – The Encouragement of Industry
- Chapter 11 - The Home Market and Home Trade
- Chapter 12 – Exports and Imports
- Chapter 13 – Confusions Arising from the Use of Money
- Chapter 14 – Do High Wages Necessitate Protection?
- Chapter 15 – Of Advantages and Disadvantages as Reasons for Protection
- Chapter 16 - The Development of Manufacturers
- Chapter 17 – Protection and Producers
- Chapter 18 - Effects of Protection on American Industry
- Chapter 19 – Protection and Wages
- Chapter 20 – The Abolition of Protection
- Chapter 21 – Inadequacy of the Free Trade Argument
- Chapter 22 - The Real Weakness of Free Trade
- Chapter 23 – The Real Strength of Protection
- Chapter 24 – The Paradox
- Chapter 25 – The Robber that Takes All that is Left
- Chapter 26 – True Free Trade
- Chapter 27 - The Lion in the Way
- Chapter 28 – Free Trade and Socialism
- Chapter 29 – Practical Politics
- Chapter 30 - Conclusion
- Index

== See also ==
- Georgism
