= 1897 New York City mayoral election =

1st election after New York City's consolidation

- November 1897
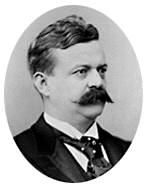

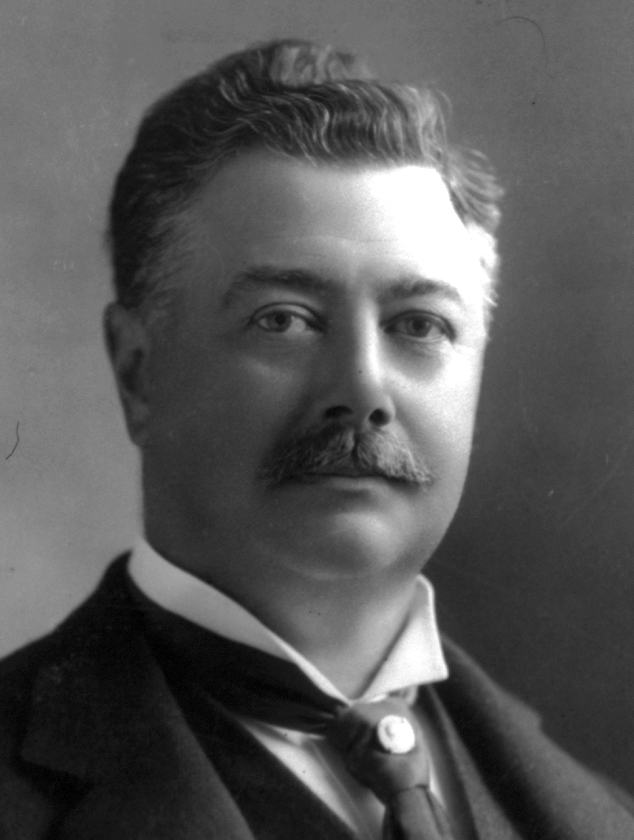

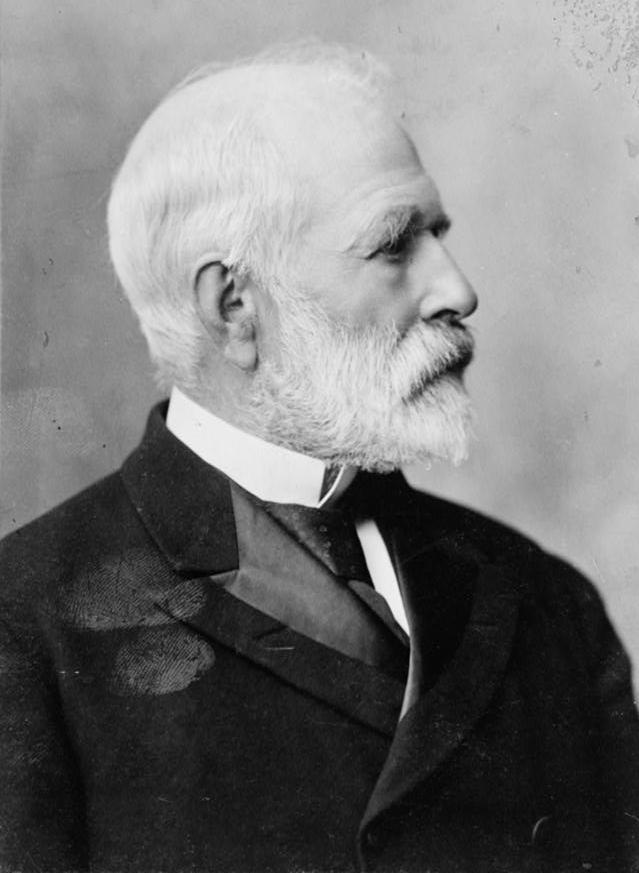
Nominee	Robert A. Van Wyck	Seth Low	Benjamin F. Tracy
Party	Democratic	Citizens Union	Republican
Popular vote	233,997	151,540	101,863
Percentage	44.7%	28.9%	19.5%
- Borough results Van Wyck: 40–50%
Mayor before election
William L. Strong (as mayor of Manhattan and the Bronx)
Republican
Elected mayor
Robert A. Van Wyck (as mayor of the City of Greater New York)
Democratic

An election for Mayor of New York City was held in November 1897. This election was held in connection with the consolidation of the City of Greater New York, which passed a public referendum on December 14, 1894, and was to be effective January 1, 1898. Thus, the winner of this election would serve as the first mayor of the consolidated city. The term for the mayoralty of the newly-consolidating city was extended to four years.

Incumbent mayor William L. Strong was not a candidate for re-election to a second term in office. The multipolar race featured chief justice of the City Court Robert A. Van Wyck, Columbia University president Seth Low, former U.S. secretary of the Navy Benjamin F. Tracy, and tax reformer Henry George. On October 29, just a few days before the election, George died. Van Wyck won the race with a plurality of the vote, followed by Low and Tracy.

== Background ==
On December 14, 1894, the voters in the towns of New York County (then coterminous with New York City and consisting of two boroughs, Manhattan and the Bronx), Kings County (consisting entirely of the consolidated city of Brooklyn), Richmond County, and Queens County voted to consolidate into one city with a unified municipal government. The city also annexed parts of southern Westchester County. The enlarged city would contain the majority of the state of New York's population.

To allow for the consolidation to take effect on January 1, 1898, the term of mayor William Lafayette Strong was extended by a year, and the next mayoral election was moved from 1896 to 1897.

== General election ==
=== Candidates ===
- Alfred B. Cruikshank (United Democracy)
- Henry George, political economist and tax reformer (Jeffersonian Democracy) (died October 29)
- Patrick Gleason, mayor of Long Island City (Independent)
- Seth Low, president of Columbia University and former mayor of Brooklyn (Citizens Union)
- Lucien Sanial, newspaper editor, economist, and activist (Socialist Labor)
- Benjamin F. Tracy, former U.S. Secretary of the Navy and U.S. Attorney for the Eastern District of New York (Republican)
- William T. Wardwell, perennial candidate (Prohibition)
- Robert Anderson Van Wyck, chief justice of the New York City Court (Democratic)

==== Withdrew ====
- James O'Brien, former U.S. Representative (United Democracy)

=== Results ===
1897 New York City mayoral election (Note: Incomplete results from the New York Times are included for the Prohibition, United Democracy, and Gleason tickets.)
Party	Candidate	Votes	%
Democratic	Robert A. Van Wyck	233,997	44.69%
Citizens Union	Seth Low	151,540	28.94%
Republican	Benjamin F. Tracy	101,863	19.46%
Jeffersonian Democracy	Henry George (deceased)	21,693	4.14%
Socialist Labor	Lucien Sanial	14,467	2.76%
Independent	Patrick Gleason	1,263	0.24%
Prohibition	William T. Wardwell	900	0.17%
United Democracy	Alfred B. Cruikshank	673	0.13%
Total votes		523,560	100.00%
Democratic gain from Republican			

==== Results by borough ====
1897	Party	The Bronx and Manhattan	Brooklyn	Queens	Richmond [Staten Is.]	Total	%
Robert A. Van Wyck	Democratic	143,666	76,185	9,275	4,871	233,997	44.7%
Robert A. Van Wyck	Democratic	48.0%	40.1%	40.7%	43.5%	233,997	44.7%
Seth Low	Citizens' Union	77,210	65,656	5,876	2,798	151,540	28.9%
Seth Low	Citizens' Union	25.8%	34.6%	25.8%	25.0%	151,540	28.9%
Benjamin F. Tracy	Republican	55,834	37,611	5,639	2,779	101,863	19.5%
Benjamin F. Tracy	Republican	18.6%	19.8%	24.7%	24.8%	101,863	19.5%
† Henry George	Jefferson Democracy	13,076	6,938	1,096	583	21,693	4.1%
Lucien Sanial	Socialist Labor	9,796	3,593	921	157	14,467	2.8%
TOTAL		299,582	189,983	22,807	11,188	523,560

Note: Although separate boroughs, the Bronx and Manhattan shared New York County and reported their election results together until the separate Bronx County was formed in April 1912 and started her separate existence on January 1, 1914. The borough of Richmond changed its name to Staten Island in 1975, although the co-extensive Richmond County still retains that name.

== Sources ==
- Carmer, Carl (1948). "From Van Wyck to O'Dwyer". In Nevins, Allan; Krout, John A. (eds.). The Greater City: New York, 1898-1948. New York: Columbia University Press. LCCN 48008678.
