= Anna George de Mille =

American feminist and Georgism advocate (1878–1947)

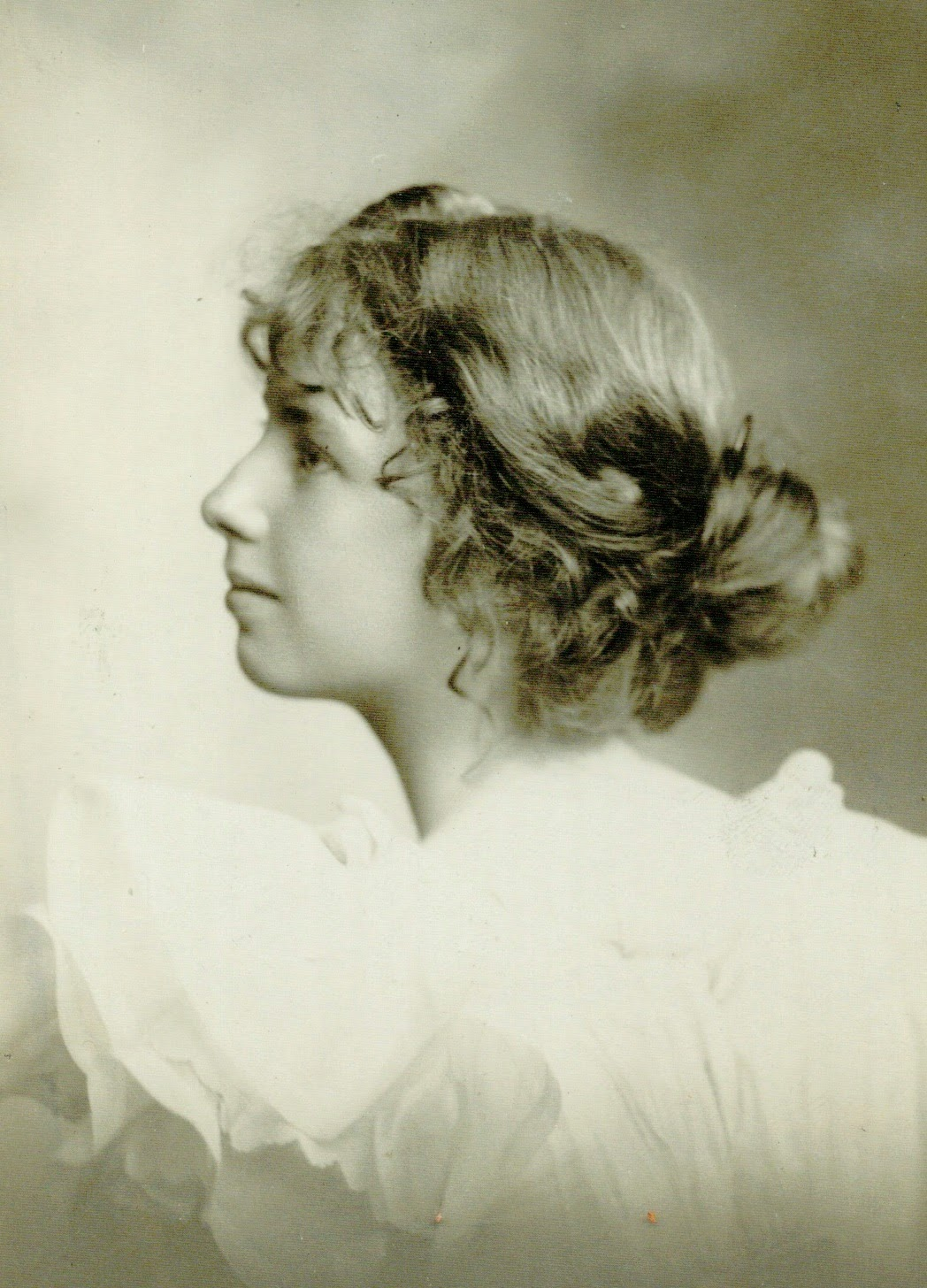
Anna George de Mille c. 1900

Anna George de Mille (1878–1947) was an American feminist and Georgist advocate. She was the mother of Agnes George de Mille.

== Biography ==
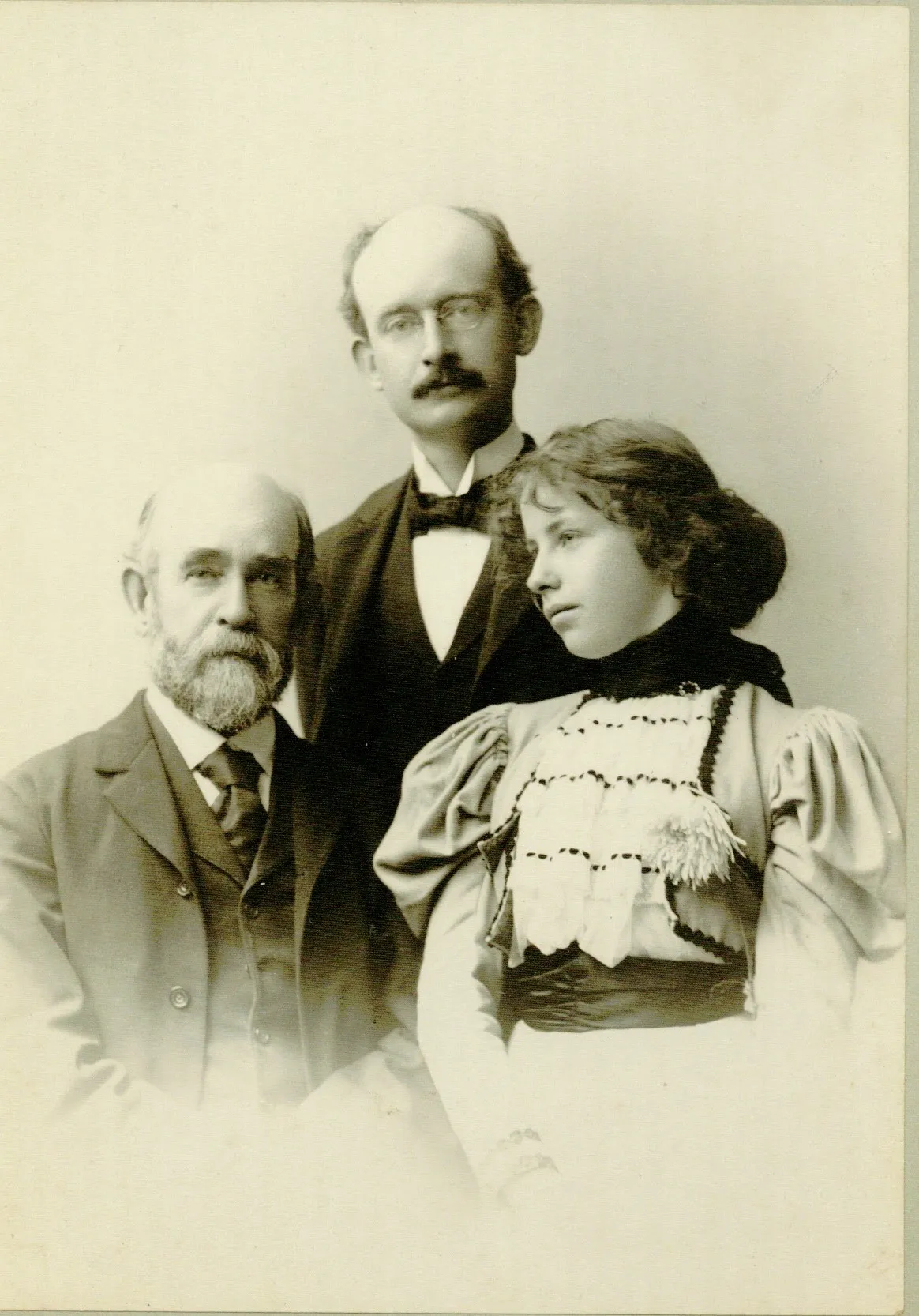
George de Mille with her father Henry George and brother Henry c. 1897

Anna George de Mille was born in San Francisco in 1878 to Henry George and Annie Corsina Fox George. Throughout her life, she served as a prominent leader of the single-tax movement, in many leadership roles including vice president of the International Union for Land Value Taxation and Free Trade in London, and a director of the Robert Schalkenbach Foundation. In 1932 she partnered with Oscar H. Geiger to establish the Henry George School of Social Science. She served as the president of the board of trustees of said school. George de Mille went on several tours promoting the single-tax movement, and was a large donor to the Henry George Collection at the New York Public Library. She served as an officer in the Henry George Foundation of Pittsburgh.

In 1950, Henry George, Citizen of the World, a biography of her father which she started writing, was published by the University of North Carolina Press after being released in The American Journal of Economics and Sociology. George de Mille also helped raise money for the restoration of Henry George's birthplace.
