= Henry George Birthplace =

Historic house in Pennsylvania, United States

- U.S. National Register of Historic Places
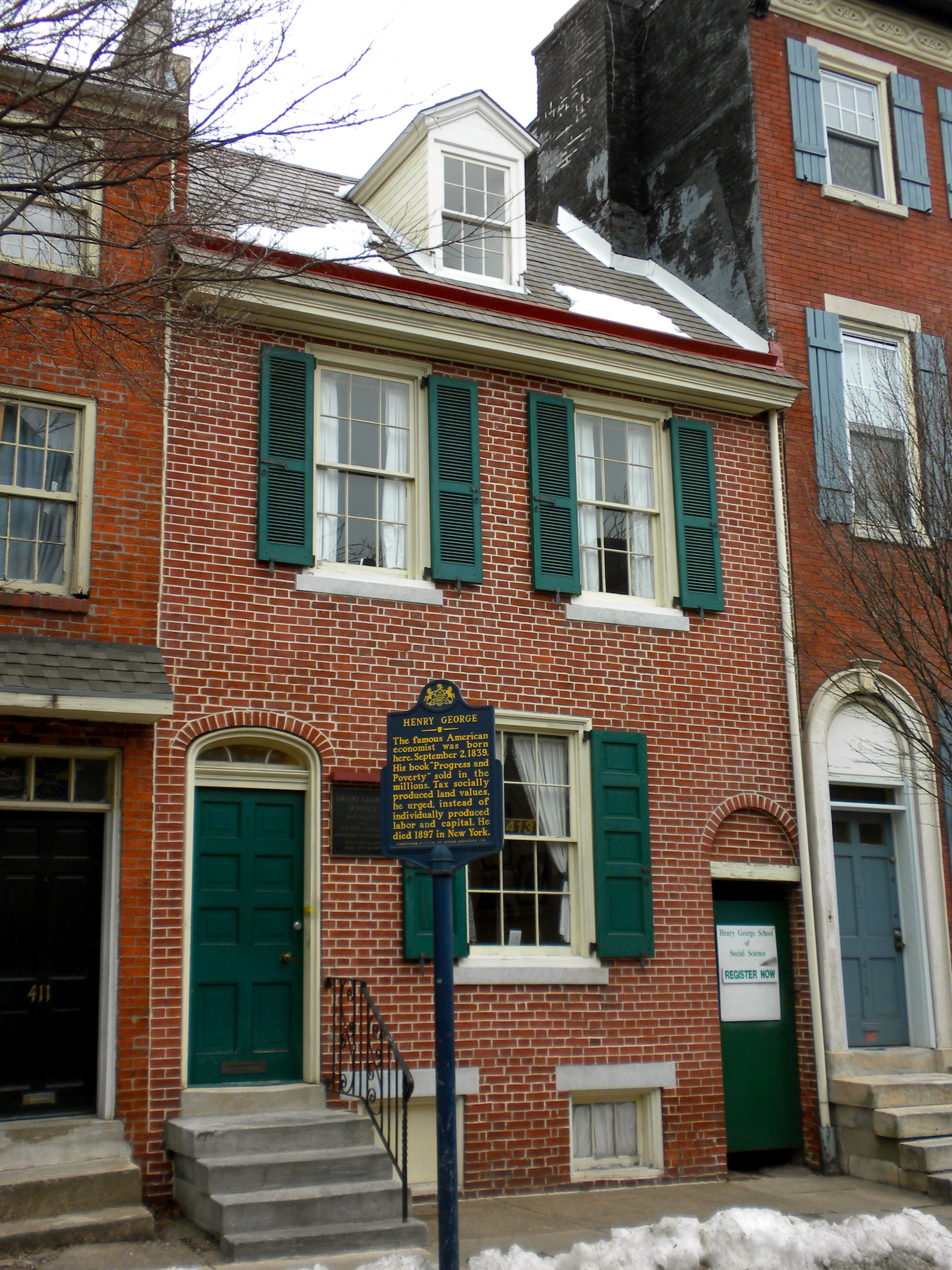
- Henry George Birthplace, February 2010

- Location within Philadelphia Location within Pennsylvania Location within the United States
- Location: 413 S. 10th Street, Philadelphia, Pennsylvania
- Coordinates: 39°56′38″N 75°9′30″W
- Area: 0.1 acres (0.040 ha)
- Built: 1801
- Built by: Harlin, Edward
- Architectural style: Federal
- NRHP reference No.: 83002268
- Added to NRHP: April 1, 1983

The Henry George Birthplace is an historic home which is located in the Washington Square West neighborhood of Philadelphia, Pennsylvania, United States.

The house was added to the National Register of Historic Places in 1983.

== History and architectural features ==
Built in 1801, this historic structure is a three-story brick rowhouse, which was designed in a late Federal style. The layout is typical of a Philadelphia rowhouse with a "front building" and "back building." It also has a "piazza." Noted journalist and economist Henry George (1839-1897) was born in the house in 1839, and resided there until 1849.
