= Jim Powell (historian) =

American historian

Jim Powell is an American author and senior fellow at the Cato Institute, a libertarian think tank in Washington, D.C. He is the author of several books about U.S. presidents, including FDR's Folly and Wilson's War. His articles have appeared in The New York Times, The Wall Street Journal, American Heritage, and many other national publications. He is based in Connecticut.

== Biography ==
Born in Norfolk, Virginia, and growing up on Long Island, Powell attended the University of Chicago where he earned a B.A. in history. As an editor of the student quarterly New Individualist Review, he helped publish articles by several future Nobel Laureates. Powell also worked as a researcher for future Nobel Laureate Ronald H. Coase. In 1976, Powell began to publish his writings, with early books primarily focused on topics about the art market, commercial real estate, and Japanese finance. By the late 1980s, he began to author books on American libertarian issues.

Powell has been a part of multiple libertarian Think Tanks, including Cato Institute. He has been associated with Cato since 1988. He has also done work for the Manhattan Institute, the Institute for Humane Studies, Citizens for a Sound Economy, the National Right to Work Committee, and Americans for Free Choice in Medicine. Powell is a published author, writing several books on the unintended consequences of presidential policies, including FDR's Folly, a critical study of Franklin D. Roosevelt's New Deal policies. He has also lectured at U.S. universities such as Harvard and Stanford, as well as internationally.

== Books ==
- The Fight For Liberty: Critical Lessons From Liberty's Greatest Champions Of The Last 2,000 Years (2012)
- Greatest Emancipations: How the West Abolished Slavery (2008) ISBN 0-230-60592-3
- Bully Boy: The Truth about Theodore Roosevelt's Legacy (2006) ISBN 0-307-23722-2
- Wilson's War: How Woodrow Wilson's Great Blunder Led to Hitler, Lenin, Stalin, and World War II (2005) ISBN 1-4000-8236-6
- FDR's Folly: How Roosevelt and His New Deal Prolonged the Great Depression (2003) ISBN 0-7615-0165-7
- The Triumph of Liberty: A 2,000-Year History Told through the Lives of Freedom's Greatest Champions (2000) ISBN 0-684-85967-X
- Gnomes of Tokyo (1988) ISBN 0-396-08964-X
- Risk, Ruin and Riches: Inside the World of Big-Time Real Estate (1986) ISBN 0-02-598530-2
- An Investor's Guide to Under-Valued Art and Antiques (1983) ISBN 0-399-12692-9
