= EBCOR =

Excess Burden Comes Out of Rent

Excess Burden Comes Out of Rent (EBCOR) is a concept of deadweight loss, unique in theory with the heterodox Georgist school of political economy. The name and acronym for EBCOR were first introduced by Mason Gaffney in 2009, who summarized the concept as being, "[The] gains to rent from removing excess burdens [of taxation]."

Excess burdens from taxation on the production and consumption of wealth (Note: According to Georgist theory, wealth is any material good that is a product of people's efforts. Items that exist in nature without human intervention are classified as land.) cause a reduction in expected rental yields, compared to if there were no such taxes in place. EBCOR, on its own, does not involve the assumption that these economic rents would be taxed themselves. Instead, EBCOR implies that such sources of rent (i.e., land value) can be taxed at a rate that does not discourage investments into the production or consumption of wealth. EBCOR is a complementary function to All Taxes Come Out of Rent (ATCOR)—also developed by Gaffney, and the Henry George theorem (HGT) popularized by Joseph Stiglitz.

== History of theory ==
=== John Locke ===
In the third part of his 1691 letter, Some Considerations of the Consequences of the Lowering of Interest and the Raising the Value of Money, John Locke (1632–1704) originates a simple proof of the concept, which Georgists in the 21st century would later label EBCOR:

A Tax laid upon Land seems hard to the Landholder, because it is so much Money going visibly out of his Pocket: And therefore as an ease to himself, the Landholder is always forward to lay it upon Commodities. But if he will throughly consider it, and examine the Effects, he will find he Buys this seeming Ease at a very dear rate: And though he pays not this Tax immediately out ofhis own Purse, yet his Purse will find it by a greater want of Money there at the end of the year, than that comes to, with the lessening of his Rents to boot; which is a settled and lasting evil, that will stick upon him beyond the present Payment.

=== The physiocrats ===
The 18th century French physiocrats not only believed that all taxes were ultimately defrayed out of rent, but that taxes on production and trade ultimately diminish rental earnings. The main argument of the physiocrats was that all taxes on production must ultimately be shifted onto the source of surplus value, which they believed to be agricultural rent, since all labor and capital costs are costs of production. François Quesnay (1694–1774) and Anne Robert Jacques Turgot (1727–1781), both leading members of the physiocratic school, believed that because taxes on production diminished returns towards the latter's management, it also therefore ultimately diminished the agricultural surplus from land.

=== Adam Smith ===
Adam Smith (1723–1790) in his 1776 magnum opus The Wealth of Nations, further developed Locke and the physiocrats' theories of tax incidence:

A tax upon the rent of land which varies with every variation of the rent, or which rises and falls according to the improvement or neglect of cultivation, is recommended by that sect of men of letters in France, who call themselves the œconomists, as the most equitable of all taxes. All taxes, they pretend, fall ultimately upon the rent of land, and ought therefore to be imposed equally upon the fund which must finally pay them. That all taxes ought to fall as equally as possible upon the fund which must finally pay them is certainly true. But without entering into the disagreeable discussion of the metaphysical arguments by which they support their very ingenious theory, it will sufficiently appear from the following review, what are the taxes which fall finally upon the rent of the land, and what are those which fall finally upon some other fund.

=== Mason Gaffney ===
Mason Gaffney (1923–2020) writes in The Hidden Taxable Capacity of Land (2009), where he originated the name for the concept as EBCOR, that:

We can raise output and jobs and investment opportunities and tax revenues above their present levels, by removing tax bias. [...] Net revenue of land IS the Taxable Surplus: we cannot tax more than that without aborting the land use.

=== Terence Dwyer ===
Terence Dwyer notes his 2014 journal article, Taxation: The Lost History, published in AJES:

However, [...] the marginal productivity of the fixed factor (land) must fall so that we are back with the result that taxes on capital and labor must cause rents to fall.

== Mathematical formulization ==
Mason Gaffney presents an equation formulizing EBCOR, in his 2009 introduction to the concept:

$NAT=N-tG=N(1-tG/N)$

Where:

- $NAT$ is net revenue after tax;
- $N$ is net revenue;
- $t$ is tax;
- $G$ is gross revenue.

Gaffney then showcases a table illustrating the effect that taxes on the production and consumption of wealth, have on gross revenue, and therefore net revenue:

Effect on Net Revenues of a 10% Tax on Gross Revenues
| Land use | $G$ ($k) | Costs ($C$) ($k) | $N$ ($k) | $G/N$ | $t$ ($k) | $NAT$ ($k) | $t/N$ (%) |
|---|---|---|---|---|---|---|---|
| A | 100 | 90 | 10 | 10 | 10 | 0 | 100 |
| B | 20 | 15 | 5 | 4 | 2 | 3 | 40 |

Simply put, a tax on gross revenue causes the landholder to favor lower productive land uses over their land's highest and best use, and therefore incurring excess burdens onto economic productivity.

== Reception ==
=== Appraisal ===
==== James and John Stuart Mill ====
In his 1821 work Elements of Political Economy, James Mill (1773–1836) stated that there was "a peculiar advantage in reserving the rent of land as a fund for supplying the exigencies of the state"—referencing land's unique properties related to tax incidence—and proposed a single tax on the increased increment in land value. John Stuart Mill (1806–1873) likewise held the same view as his father, and campaigned fanatically against "parasitical" landlordism during the Victorian era throughout his lifetime.

==== Henry George ====
Henry George (1839–1897) was as evenly inspired by Locke's special theory of tax incidence as he was by the Ricardian law of rent. In his 1879 seminal work Progress and Poverty, Henry George pushed back against his British forebearers who were skeptical of Locke's special theory of tax incidence. He argued that the logical conclusion of Ricardian economics was a single tax on land.

=== Criticism ===
==== David Hume ====
David Hume (1711–1776) believed that merchants could simply raise prices to cover their tax burden. He attacked Locke's special theory of tax incidence in his 1752 treatise Political Discourses, where he credits Locke himself for popularizing what he believes to be an error in political economy.

Hume simply held the revisionist, anti-physiocratic view that since landlords bear the ultimate burden of land taxes, consumers must therefore bear the ultimate burden of consumption taxes, the latter being his preferred and sole system of taxation.

==== Sir James Steuart ====
Sir James Steuart (1712–1780) rejected Locke's theorem that all taxes would ultimately fall on land, and instead held that all indirect taxation falls equally on both monied interests and landlords. However, Sir James Steuart failed to consider that because wealth taxes encourage capital flight, as he acknowledged, indirect taxation ultimately comes out of land values.
