= ATCOR =

Taxation acronym

All Taxes Come Out of Rent (ATCOR) is a central theory of the heterodox Georgist school of political economy. Predecessor theories to ATCOR were developed by John Locke, the physiocrats, Adam Smith, and H. Bronson Cowan. In 1998, Mason Gaffney formalized the acronym and theory, describing ATCOR as follows:

The meaning and relevance of ATCOR is that when we lower other taxes, the revenue base is not lost, but shifted to land rents and values, which can then yield more taxes.

Gaffney argued that ATCOR necessarily follows from the inelastic supply of land, the elastic supply of labor and capital, and observations of other forms of taxation. ATCOR has been shown to work in a few U.S. cities, including Cleveland, San Francisco, and New York City.

ATCOR is complementary to the Henry George theorem (HGT), popularized by Joseph Stiglitz—as well as Excess Burden Comes Out of Rent (EBCOR), also introduced by Mason Gaffney.

== History of theory ==
=== John Locke ===
While the term "ATCOR" was first referenced by Mason Gaffney, the concept was first mentioned by John Locke (1632-1704) over three-hundred years prior. John Locke wrote in 1691:

It is in vain in a Country whose great Fund is Land, to hope to lay the publick charge of the Government on any thing else; there at last it will terminate. The Merchant (do what you can) will not bear it, the Labourer cannot, and therefore the Landholder must: And whether he were best do it, by laying it directly, where it will at last settle, or by letting it come to him by the sinking of his Rents, which when they are once fallen every one knows are not easily raised again, let him consider.

=== The physiocrats ===
The physiocrats focused extensively on agricultural productivity, developing their theories within the agrarian economy of the Kingdom of France in the 1700s. It should also be noted that while François Quesnay (1694-1774) believed that the agricultural economy was superior to the mercantile economy, his other physiocratic contemporaries did not see the same. Gaffney writes in his notes on the physiocrats in their relation to ATCOR:

They did not view this tax shift as a real shift that would raise the tax burden on landowners, because they believed other kinds of taxes are shifted to landowners anyway. You can't squeeze blood out of a stone, they reasoned, so there is only one true taxable surplus, and that is rent, the Net Product of land. For an acronym, we will use ATCOR (All Taxes Come Out of Rent) for this Physiocratic doctrine of tax incidence. Mirabeau's Theory of Taxation, 1760, spelled it out.

=== Adam Smith ===
Mason Gaffney wrote in his 2007 paper that Adam Smith (1723-1790) "deplored the 'indolence of landowners'" and referenced the concept from his physiocratic forebears:

Adam Smith, a student of Turgot and Quesnay, deplored the 'indolence of landowners' that keeps them from seeing the principle, for then they would see that they hurt themselves the most by shunting taxes off land and onto labor, capital, trade, and production. Taxes on useful activity are shifted to rents, he observed, and more: such taxes impose excess burdens that are also shifted to rents...

=== Thomas Robert Malthus ===
Thomas Robert Malthus (1766-1834) argued within his famous treatise An Essay on the Principle of Population, that in the short-term, taxes on agricultural activity fall on labor and capital—but in the long-run the tax ultimately falls on rent. In a letter to David Ricardo dated to 1815, Malthus wrote:

[...] I think however there are often cases where taxes are thrown off on the landlord, and I meant to say that those which had not already been thrown off on the consumer would then be thrown off on the landlord.

=== H. Bronson Cowan ===
Real-estate appraiser H. Bronson Cowan explained in the June 1953 issue of The Henry George News how shifts in land value after the imposition of a land tax (which he referred to as a site-value tax) will not always decrease the capital value of land, unless other taxes have been cut or the tax base fully shifted onto land.

=== Mason Gaffney ===
Mason Gaffney (1923-2020) was the first economist to name the concept, labelling it ATCOR in 1998. Taxes on labor (wages) and capital (interest), he wrote, did not increase the size of the revenue pie, but took away from what would become rent's (land's Net Product) complete aggregate, consummating all of the potential taxable income within a locational jurisdiction.

In Gaffney's 1998 excerpt, The Physiocratic Concept of ATCOR, based on his previous lecture notes, he outlines the basic logic of the economic concept:

A. Land supply fixed, capital and labor elastic, demand elastic. The thesis that all taxes are shifted to landowners follows logically from two premises. One, after-tax interest rates are determined by world markets, so the local supply of capital is perfectly elastic at a fixed, after-tax rate. Two, labor has been reduced to so low a level that it cannot bear any more tax burden. Anyone may test the premises by observation.

He then highlights the history of economic thought behind the concept:

B. Venerable tradition of ATCOR in the history of economic thought:

- Physiocrats, preceded by John Locke and Jacob Vanderlint
- Adam Smith on "indolence of landowners"
- Paul Douglas; Bronson Cowan; Ebenezer Howard; David Bradford, et al., 1992 NTJ; Dick Netzer (with caveats);
- Others?

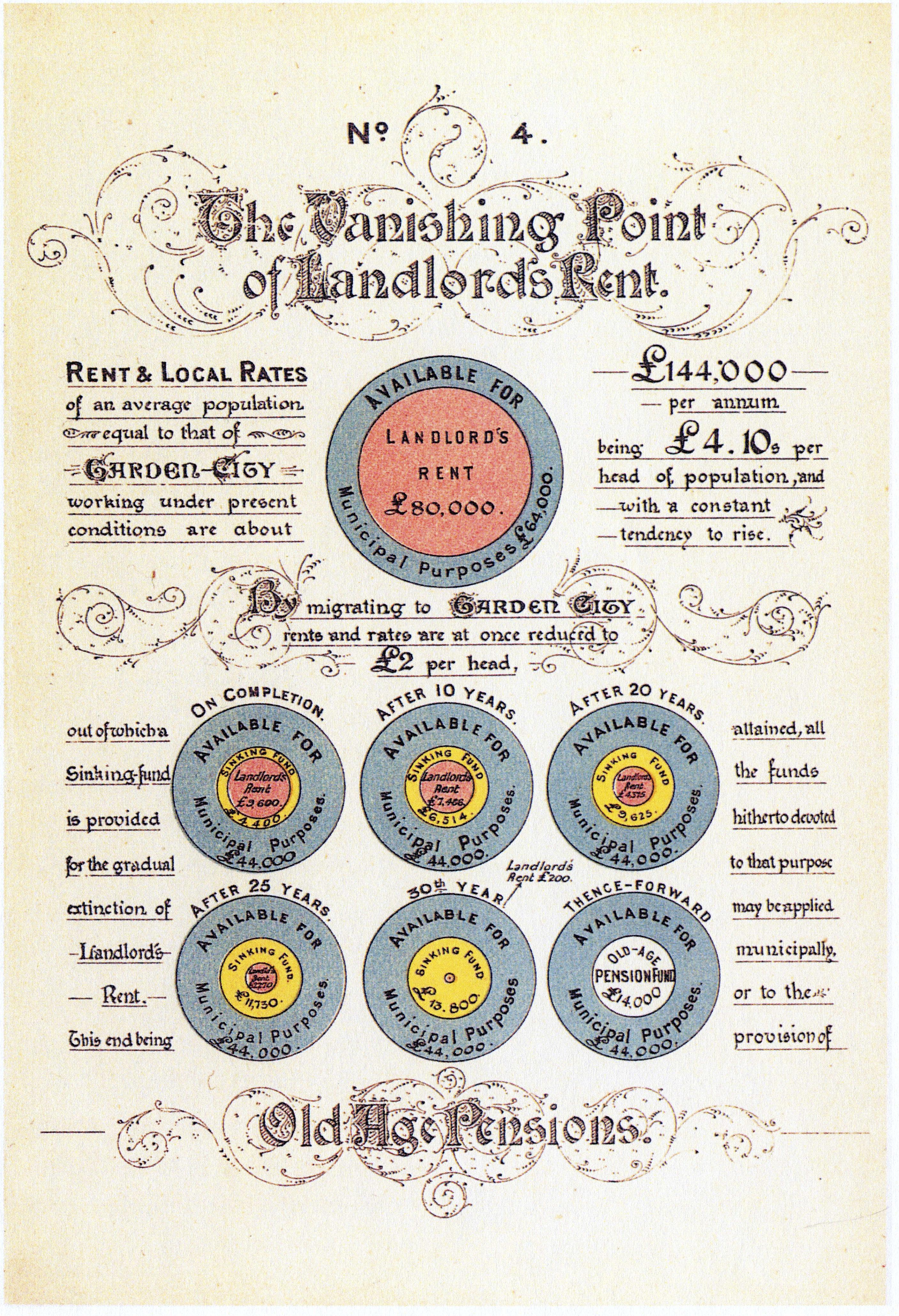
Diagram No. 4 from Ebenezer Howard's To-morrow: A Peaceful Path to Real Reform (1898), an early illustration of the concept later labelled as ATCOR.

Next, Gaffney highlights academic hostility to the concept:

C. Muddying the waters of theory.

Forward shifting of property tax, a la Musgrave. This shift requires our assuming the tax is imposed on just one land use, usually housing, in one small jurisdiction. It is what Howard Jarvis seized on and used to promise tenants that lowering property taxes would automatically lower their rents, since property owners, as he put it, do "not pay one cent" in property taxes, but shift them all to tenants. As soon as Prop. 13 passed, rents shot upwards, and have never looked back except in particular micro-markets like cyclical Silicon Valley.

This is one result of displacing production theory by price theory in economic doctrines. In production theory you would assume elastic demand, and focus on the effect on factor proportions (changing productive processes and products, a la Kneese and Bowers).

- Fixed capital supply. Harberger; Seligman; Harriss
- Twisting the Ramsey Rule by most economists. McLure and Zodrow; Lindsey, and most texts on public finance as examples. Notable exceptions are Ramsey himself, Pigou who inspired him, and Stiglitz.

Gaffney ends his notes with a finalized summary on ATCOR:

The revenue capacity of land, when it is substituted for other tax bases, is comparable to current revenues. Owing to efficiency effects, and renewal effects, it may well be higher.

== Economic principles ==
=== Inelastic supply of land ===
The primary argument for ATCOR begins with the fact that economic land is both finite and essential to economic activity; in other words, land has an inelastic supply and an elastic demand. Since the supply of land is fixed, any tax cuts on labor and capital will result in a marginal increase in the value of land. For example, income saved from paying less income tax allows a greater borrowing capacity in the short run as well as an absolute increase in the value of land in the long run. This means that income from land ultimately absorbs most of the income gains caused by tax cuts on labor and capital in the long run.

=== Elastic supply of labor and capital ===
The supply of labor is affected by events such as human migration, shifts in the employment rate, and the availability of jobs. For these reasons, labor tends to be highly mobile in the long run and thus has a highly elastic supply, especially when compared to the perfectly inelastic supply of land. The elasticity of labor can be demonstrated in the Tiebout model.

Similarly, the supply of capital can be considered perfectly elastic in the long run due to the real interest rate, especially in comparison to land.

Consequently, the revenue base does not disappear when taxes on labor, capital, and consumption are reduced. Instead, most tax cuts (Note: Although capital can be perfectly elastic, labor technically has finite elasticity. Hence, not all taxes shift to landowners when they are cut, although most do.) cause land rental values and land capital values to increase, which can yield more taxes from landowners.

=== Analogous principles with other forms of taxation ===
The principles of ATCOR can be observed with other forms of taxation, as Gaffney elaborates:

Lowering the corporate income tax rate raises stock prices. Lowering interest rates raises real estate prices. Commercial rents are multipartite, so a lower share of gross revenue means a higher fixed rent. Oil leases are multipartite, and a higher fixed royalty rate means lower bonus bids. Wartime taxes depress land prices, while peace dividends let them rise again. Land booms follow a long history of peace dividends worldwide. The Resource Curse Effect: an influx of mineral revenues, obviating other taxes, leads to land booms. The remarkable productivity of the U.S. income tax when wages were exempt, 1916-30, and we paid for World War I with less deficit finance than any other belligerent. The utility-rate effect: lower rates mean higher rents and land prices, as observed in practice and explained in theory by Hotelling, Vickrey, Stiglitz, Feldstein, and others.

== Examples ==
=== Cleveland (1900-1920) ===
The population of Cleveland, Ohio grew 109% from 1900 to 1920, with most of the city at the time being under the administration of Georgists Tom L. Johnson (1901-1909) and Newton D. Baker (1911-1916).

In 1909, with the help of William Somers as Chief Clerk—who had previously provided Johnson with a standard unit of land assessment back in 1901—they both managed to raise assessments from $180m to $500m with their new data set. As Gaffney puts it in 2006:

Johnson and Somers analyzed property assessments, and found that assessors had been undervaluing holdings in rich neighborhoods, and overvaluing those in poor.

Back in 1901, Johnson set up a tax school sponsored by his city administration to educate and persuade Cleveland's public to shift property taxes from capital to land alone. The tax school eventually ceased its operations when the city's largest landowners disapproved of its existence.

After an interim two-year period without a single taxer as mayor, Newton Baker was elected in 1911. Both mayors presided over rapid population growth in Cleveland, which doubled within the first two decades of the 1900s. A massive construction boom and subsequent high land values followed, which were enough to cover the treasury losses from exempting improvements at the time.

=== San Francisco (1907-1930) ===
Under the mayoralty of Georgist Edward Robeson Taylor (1907-1910), San Francisco rapidly recovered from the 1906 earthquake and managed to maintain its population growth. At the time, most of the tax base was land value, which was unaffected by the earthquake and subsequent fires. The rebuilding of the city-county and the financing of subsequent public works were thus supported and facilitated by the taxable capacity of land. James Rolph, the mayor from 1911 to 1930, maintained the land-taxing power of the city government and spent the revenue on improving public goods.

=== New York City (1921-1931) ===
In September 1920, New York Governor Al Smith (1923-1928) declared a housing crisis in New York City—a crisis that included zero vacancies, high rents, and soaring evictions—and called a special session of the New York State Legislature to find a remedy. During that same month, Governor Al Smith called to exempt investments into new capital improvements from property taxation. The legislature advanced his proposal and tailored the bill specifically to NYC with its "local option" feature. The new local law caused an immediate boom in housing construction and massive population growth. Despite the law exempting new improvements from taxation expiring in 1931, land value remained subject to taxation, and local housing construction continued even during the Great Depression, all the way to 1940.

Although the NYC-amended property tax exempted new improvements, the city's total tax income actually increased, suggesting ATCOR's validity. As a committee led by Clarence Stein put it in 1924:

There has been a tremendous increase in land assessments since 1920 in all the boroughs. ... The resumption of building has greatly increased the taxable value of the land, which is not included in the exemption. ... Tax exemption is creating aggregate taxable values to an extent heretofore unknown in the history of any municipality.

== Criticism ==
Criticism of the ATCOR concept often revolves around its assumptions. A popular criticism of the theory is that its reliance on a perfectly elastic supply of labor and capital oversimplifies real-world economic dynamics. Gaffney himself acknowledged in his introductory paper on the subject that the supply of labor may not always be perfectly elastic, but noted "so some of the revenue gains may be 'lost' in higher wage rates, but on the whole higher wage rates are socially desirable, and serve to lower many public costs". It could also be said that ATCOR does not conclusively prove that a single tax system based on land value (as envisioned by Georgists) would generate sufficient revenue to replace current taxation systems.

== See also ==
- Tax reform
