= Georgism =

Economic philosophy centered on common ownership of land

Georgist campaign button from the 1890s. The cat on the badge refers to the slogan "Do you see the cat?" from a story by Congressman James G. Maguire. He compared understanding the Single Tax to being able to make out a cat in a picture of a landscape.

Georgism, in modern times also called Geoism, and known historically as the single tax movement, is an economic ideology holding that persons should own the value that they produce themselves, while the economic rent derived from land—including from all natural resources, the commons, and urban locations—should belong equally to all members of society. Developed from the writings of American economist and social reformer Henry George, the Georgist paradigm seeks solutions to social and ecological problems based on principles of land rights and public finance that attempt to integrate economic efficiency with social justice.

Georgism is concerned with the distribution of economic rent caused by land ownership, natural monopolies, pollution rights, and control of the commons, including title of ownership for natural resources and other contrived privileges (e.g., intellectual property). Any natural resource that is inherently limited in supply can generate economic rent, but the classical and most significant example of land monopoly involves the extraction of common ground rent from valuable urban locations. Georgists argue that taxing economic rent is efficient, fair, and equitable. The main Georgist policy recommendation is a land value tax (LVT), the revenues from which can be used to reduce or eliminate existing taxes (such as on income, trade, or purchases) that are posited to be unfair and inefficient. Some Georgists also advocate the return of surplus public revenue to the people by means of a basic income or citizen's dividend.

George popularized the concept of gaining public revenues mainly from land and natural resource privileges with his first book, Progress and Poverty (1879). The philosophical basis of Georgism draws on thinkers such as John Locke, Baruch Spinoza, and Thomas Paine. Economists from Adam Smith and David Ricardo to Milton Friedman and Joseph Stiglitz have observed that a public levy on land value does not cause economic inefficiency, unlike other taxes. A land value tax also has progressive effects. Advocates of land value taxes argue that they reduce economic inequality, increase economic efficiency, remove incentives to under-utilize urban land, and reduce property speculation.

Georgist ideas were popular and influential in the late 19th and early 20th centuries. Political parties, institutions, and communities were founded on Georgist principles. Early devotees of George's economic philosophy were often termed Single Taxers for their political goal of raising public revenue mainly or only from a land-value tax, although Georgists endorsed multiple forms of rent capture (e.g. seigniorage) as legitimate. One contemporary and friend of Henry George who advocated strongly for the Single Tax movement, and lectured at related organizations such as the Manhattan Single Tax Club, was Charles Frederic Adams. The term Georgism was invented later, and some prefer the term geoism as more generic.

== Main tenets ==
=== Land rent and wealth ===
A supply and demand diagram showing the effects of land-value taxation in which burden of the tax is entirely on the landowner when the tax is implemented. The rental price of land does not change and there is no deadweight loss.

Henry George is best known for popularizing the argument that government should be funded by a tax on land rent rather than taxes on labor. He believed that although scientific experiments could not be performed in political economy, theories could be tested by comparing different societies with different conditions and by thought experiments about the effects of various factors. Applying this method, he concluded that many societal problems, such as poverty, inequality, and economic booms and busts, can be attributed to private ownership of the necessary resource: land rent. In his most celebrated book, Progress and Poverty, George argues that the appropriation of land rent for private use contributes to persistent poverty in spite of technological progress, and causes economies to tend toward boom-and-bust cycles. According to George, people justly own what they create, but natural opportunities and land belong equally to all.

The tax upon land values is, therefore, the most just and equal of all taxes. It falls only upon those who receive from society a peculiar and valuable benefit, and upon them in proportion to the benefit they receive. It is the taking by the community, for the use of the community, of that value which is the creation of the community. It is the application of the common property to common uses. When all rent is taken by taxation for the needs of the community, then will the equality ordained by Nature be attained. No citizen will have an advantage over any other citizen save as is given by his industry, skill, and intelligence; and each will obtain what he fairly earns. Then, but not till then, will labor get its full reward, and capital its natural return.

— Henry George, Progress and Poverty, Book VIII, Chapter 3

George believed there is an important distinction between common and collective property. Although equal rights to land might be achieved by nationalizing land and then leasing it to private users, George preferred taxing unimproved land value and leaving the control of land mostly in private hands. His reason for leaving land in private control and slowly shifting to land value tax was that it would not penalize existing owners who had improved land and would also be less disruptive and controversial in a country where land titles have already been granted.

Georgists have observed that privately created wealth is socialized via the tax system (e.g., through income and sales tax), while socially created wealth in land values are privatized in the price of land titles and bank mortgages. The opposite would be the case if land rents replaced taxes on labor as the main source of public revenue; socially created wealth would become available for use by the community, while the fruits of labor would remain private. According to Georgists, a land value tax can be considered a user fee instead of a tax, since it is related to the market value of socially created locational advantage, the privilege to exclude others from locations. Assets consisting of commodified privilege can be considered wealth since they have exchange value, similar to taxi medallions. A land value tax, charging fees for exclusive use of land, as a means of raising public revenue is also a progressive tax tending to reduce economic inequality, since it applies entirely to ownership of valuable land, which correlates with income, and there is generally no means by which landlords can shift the tax burden onto tenants or laborers. Landlords cannot pass the tax on to tenants because the supply and demand of rented land is unchanged. Because the supply of land is perfectly inelastic, land rents depend on what tenants are prepared to pay, rather than on the expenses of landlords, and so the tax cannot be passed on to tenants.

=== Economic properties ===
Standard economic theory suggests that a land value tax would be extremely efficient—unlike other taxes, it does not reduce economic productivity. Milton Friedman called George's tax on unimproved land value the "least bad tax", since unlike other taxes, it would not impose an excess burden on economic activity (leading to zero or even negative "deadweight loss"); hence, a replacement of other more "distortionary" taxes with a land value tax would improve economic welfare. Joseph Stiglitz argues that a land value tax can improve the use of land and redirect investment toward productive, non-rent-seeking activities. Because land value tax would apply to foreign land speculators, the Australian Treasury estimated that land value tax was unique in having a negative marginal excess burden, meaning that it would increase long-run living standards.

Adam Smith first noted the efficiency and distributional properties of a land value tax in The Wealth of Nations

Ground-rents are a still more proper subject of taxation than the rent of houses. A tax upon ground-rents would not raise the rents of houses. It would fall altogether upon the owner of the ground-rent, who acts always as a monopolist, and exacts the greatest rent which can be got for the use of his ground. More or less can be got for it according as the competitors happen to be richer or poorer, or can afford to gratify their fancy for a particular spot of ground at a greater or smaller expense. In every country the greatest number of rich competitors is in the capital, and it is there accordingly that the highest ground-rents are always to be found. As the wealth of those competitors would in no respect be increased by a tax upon ground-rents, they would not probably be disposed to pay more for the use of the ground. Whether the tax was to be advanced by the inhabitant, or by the owner of the ground, would be of little importance. The more the inhabitant was obliged to pay for the tax, the less he would incline to pay for the ground; so that the final payment of the tax would fall altogether upon the owner of the ground-rent. Both ground-rents and the ordinary rent of land are a species of revenue which the owner, in many cases, enjoys without any care or attention of his own. Though a part of this revenue should be taken from him in order to defray the expenses of the state, no discouragement will thereby be given to any sort of industry. The annual produce of the land and labour of the society, the real wealth and revenue of the great body of the people, might be the same after such a tax as before. Ground-rents and the ordinary rent of land are, therefore, perhaps, the species of revenue which can best bear to have a peculiar tax imposed upon them. ... Nothing can be more reasonable than that a fund which owes its existence to the good government of the state should be taxed peculiarly, or should contribute something more than the greater part of other funds, towards the support of that government.

— Adam Smith, The Wealth of Nations, Book V, Chapter 2

Benjamin Franklin and Winston Churchill made similar distributional and efficiency arguments for taxing land rents. They noted that the costs of taxes and the benefits of public spending always eventually apply to and enrich the owners of land. Therefore, they believed it would be best to defray public costs and recapture value of public spending by applying public charges directly to owners of land titles, rather than harming public welfare with taxes assessed against beneficial activities such as trade and labor.

Henry George wrote that his plan for a high land value tax would cause people "to contribute to the public, not in proportion to what they produce ... but in proportion to the value of natural [common] opportunities that they hold [monopolize]". He went on to explain that "by taking for public use that value which attaches to land by reason of the growth and improvement of the community", it would, "make the holding of land unprofitable to the mere owner, and profitable only to the user".

A high land value tax would discourage speculators from holding valuable natural opportunities (like urban real estate) unused or only partially used. Henry George claimed this would have many benefits, including the reduction or elimination of tax burdens from poorer neighborhoods and agricultural districts; the elimination of a multiplicity of taxes and expensive obsolete government institutions; the elimination of corruption, fraud, and evasion with respect to the collection of taxes; the enablement of true free trade; the destruction of monopolies; the elevation of wages to the full value of labor; the transformation of labor-saving inventions into blessings for all; and the equitable distribution of comfort, leisure, and other advantages that are made possible by an advancing civilization. In this way, the vulnerability that market economies have to credit bubbles and property manias would be reduced.

=== Sources of economic rent and related policy interventions ===
Income flow resulting from payments for restricted access to natural opportunities or for contrived privileges over geographic regions is termed economic rent. Georgists argue that economic rent of land, legal privileges, and natural monopolies should accrue to the community, rather than private owners. In economics, "land" is everything that exists in nature independent of human activity. George explicitly included climate, soil, waterways, mineral deposits, laws/forces of nature, public ways, forests, oceans, air, and solar energy in the category of land. While the philosophy of Georgism does not say anything definitive about specific policy interventions needed to address problems posed by various sources of economic rent, the common goal among modern Georgists is to capture and share (or reduce) rent from all sources of natural monopoly and legal privilege.

Henry George shared the goal of modern Georgists to socialize or dismantle rent from all forms of land monopoly and legal privilege. However, George emphasized mainly his preferred policy known as land value tax, which targeted a particular form of unearned income known as ground rent. George emphasized ground-rent because basic locations were more valuable than other monopolies and everybody needed locations to survive, which he contrasted with the less significant streetcar and telegraph monopolies, which George also criticized. George likened the problem to a laborer traveling home who is waylaid by a series of highway robbers along the way, each who demand a small portion of the traveler's wages, and finally at the very end of the road waits a robber who demands all that the traveler has left. George reasoned that it made little difference to challenge the series of small robbers when the final robber remained to demand all that the common laborer had left. George predicted that over time technological advancements would increase the frequency and importance of lesser monopolies, yet he expected that ground rent would remain dominant. George even predicted that ground-rents would rise faster than wages and income to capital, a prediction that modern analysis has shown to be plausible, since the supply of land is fixed.

Spatial rent is still the primary emphasis of Georgists because of its large value and the known dis-economies of misused land. However, there are other sources of rent that are theoretically analogous to ground-rent and are debated topics of Georgists. The following are some sources of economic rent.

- Extractable resources (minerals and hydrocarbons)
- Severables (forests and stocks of fish)
- Extraterrestrial domains (geosynchronous orbits and airway corridor use)
- Legal privileges that apply to specific location (taxi medallions, billboard and development permits, or the monopoly of electromagnetic frequencies)
- Restrictions/taxes of pollution or severance (tradable emission permits and fishing quotas)
- Right-of-way (transportation) used by railroads, utilities, and internet service providers
- Issuance of legal tender (see seigniorage)
- Privileges that are less location dependent but that still exclude others from natural opportunities (patents)

Where free competition is impossible, such as telegraphs, water, gas, and transportation, George wrote, "[S]uch business becomes a proper social function, which should be controlled and managed by and for the whole people concerned." Georgists were divided by this question of natural monopolies and often favored public ownership only of the rents from common rights-of-way, rather than public ownership of utility companies themselves.

=== Georgism and environmental economics ===
The early conservationism of the Progressive Era was inspired partly by Henry George, and his influence extended for decades afterward. Some ecological economists still support the Georgist policy of land value tax as a means of freeing or rewilding unused land and conserving nature by reducing urban sprawl.

Pollution degrades the value of what Georgists consider to be commons. Because pollution is a negative contribution, a taking from the commons or a cost imposed on others, its value is economic rent, even when the polluter is not receiving an explicit income. Therefore, to the extent that society determines pollution to be harmful, most Georgists propose to limit pollution with taxation or quotas that capture the resulting rents for public use, restoration, or a citizen's dividend.

Georgism is related to the school of ecological economics, since both propose market-based restrictions for pollution. The schools are compatible in that they advocate using similar tools as part of a conservation strategy, but they emphasize different aspects. Conservation is a central issue of ecology, whereas economic rent is the central issue of geoism. Ecological economists might price pollution fines more conservatively to prevent inherently unquantifiable damage to the environment, whereas Georgists might emphasize mediation between conflicting interests and human rights. Geolibertarianism, a market-oriented branch of Geoism, tends to take a direct stance against what it perceives as burdensome regulation and would like to see auctioned pollution quotas or taxes replace most command and control regulation.

Since ecologists are primarily concerned with conservation, they tend to emphasize less the issue of equitably distributing scarcity/pollution rents, whereas Georgists insist that unearned income not accrue to those who hold title to natural assets and pollution privilege. To the extent that geoists recognize the effect of pollution or share conservationist values, they will agree with ecological economists about the need to limit pollution, but geoists will also insist that pollution rents generated from those conservation efforts do not accrue to polluters and are instead used for public purposes or to compensate those who suffer the negative effects of pollution. Ecological economists advocate similar pollution restrictions but, emphasizing conservation first, might be willing to grant private polluters the privilege to capture pollution rents. To the extent that ecological economists share the geoist view of social justice, they would advocate auctioning pollution quotas instead of giving them away for free. This distinction can be seen in the difference between basic cap and trade and the geoist variation, cap and share, a proposal to auction temporary pollution permits, with rents going to the public, instead of giving pollution privilege away for free to existing polluters or selling perpetual permits.

=== Revenue uses ===
The revenue can allow the reduction or elimination of taxes, greater public investment/spending, or the direct distribution of funds to citizens as a pension or basic income/citizen's dividend.

In practice, the elimination of all other taxes implies a high land value tax, greater than any currently existing land tax. Introducing or increasing a land value tax would cause the purchase price of land to decrease. George did not believe landowners should be compensated and described the issue as being analogous to compensation for former slave owners. Other geoists disagree on the question of compensation; some advocate complete compensation while others endorse only enough compensation required to achieve Georgist reforms. Some geoists advocate compensation only for a net loss due to a shift of taxation to land value; most taxpayers would gain from the replacement of other taxes with a tax on land value. Historically, those who advocated for taxes on rent tax only great enough to replace other taxes were known as endorsers of single tax limited.

== Synonyms and variants ==
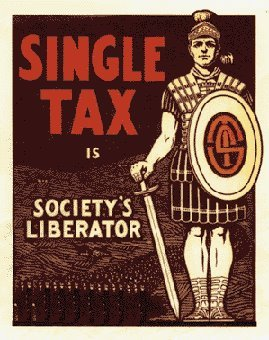
Georgist single tax poster published in The Public, a Chicago newspaper (c. 1910–1914)

Most early advocacy groups described themselves as single taxers and George reluctantly accepted the single tax as an accurate name for his main political goal—the repeal of all unjust or inefficient taxes, to be replaced with a land value tax (LVT).

Some modern proponents are dissatisfied with the name Georgist. While Henry George was well known throughout his life, he has been largely forgotten by the public and the idea of a single tax of land predates him. Some now prefer the term geoism, with geo (from Greek γῆ gē "earth, land") being the first compound of the name George < (Gr.) Geōrgios < geōrgos "farmer" or geōrgia "agriculture, farming" < gē + ergon "work" deliberately ambiguous. The terms Earth Sharing, geonomics and geolibertarianism are also used by some Georgists. These terms represent a difference of emphasis and sometimes real differences about how land rent should be spent (citizen's dividend or just replacing other taxes), but they all agree that land rent should be recovered from its private recipients.

Compulsory fines and fees related to land rents are the most common Georgist policies, but some geoists prefer voluntary value capture systems that rely on methods such as non-compulsory or self-assessed location value fees, community land trusts and purchasing land value covenants. Some geoists believe that partially compensating landowners is a politically expedient compromise necessary for achieving reform. For similar reasons, others propose capturing only future land value increases, instead of all land rent.

Some libertarians and minarchists take the position that limited social spending should be financed using Georgist concepts of rent value capture, but that not all land rent should be captured. Today, this relatively conservative adaptation is usually considered incompatible with true geolibertarianism, which requires that excess rents be gathered and then distributed back to residents. During George's time, this restrained Georgist philosophy was known as "single tax limited", as opposed to "single tax unlimited." George disagreed with the limited interpretation, but accepted its adherents (e.g., Thomas Shearman) as legitimate "single-taxers".

== Influence ==
=== Political parties ===
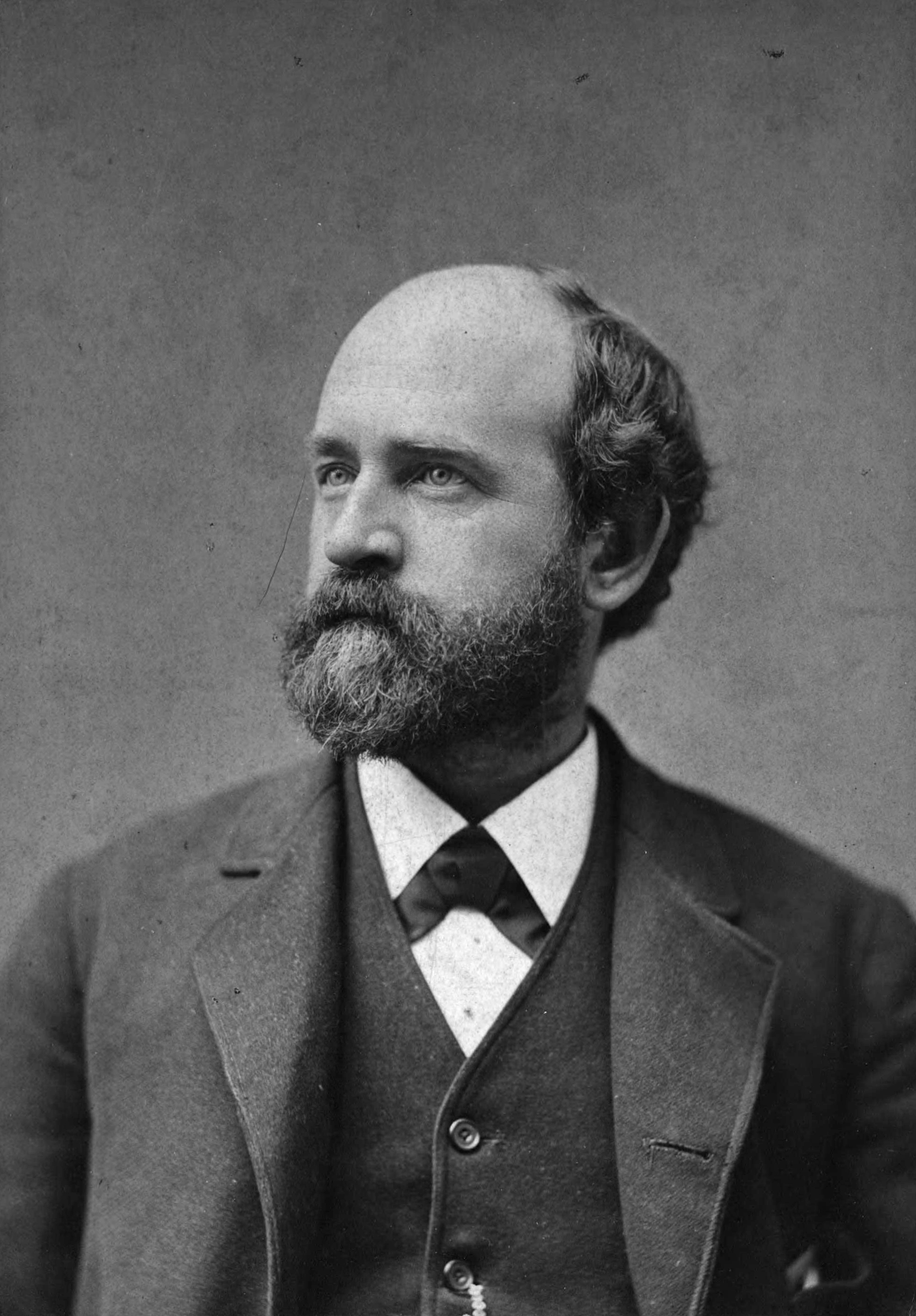
Henry George, whose writings and advocacy form the basis for Georgism

Georgist ideas heavily influenced the politics of the early 20th century. Political parties that were formed based on Georgist ideas include the Commonwealth Land Party in the United States, the Henry George Justice Party in Victoria, the Single Tax League in South Australia, and the Justice Party in Denmark.

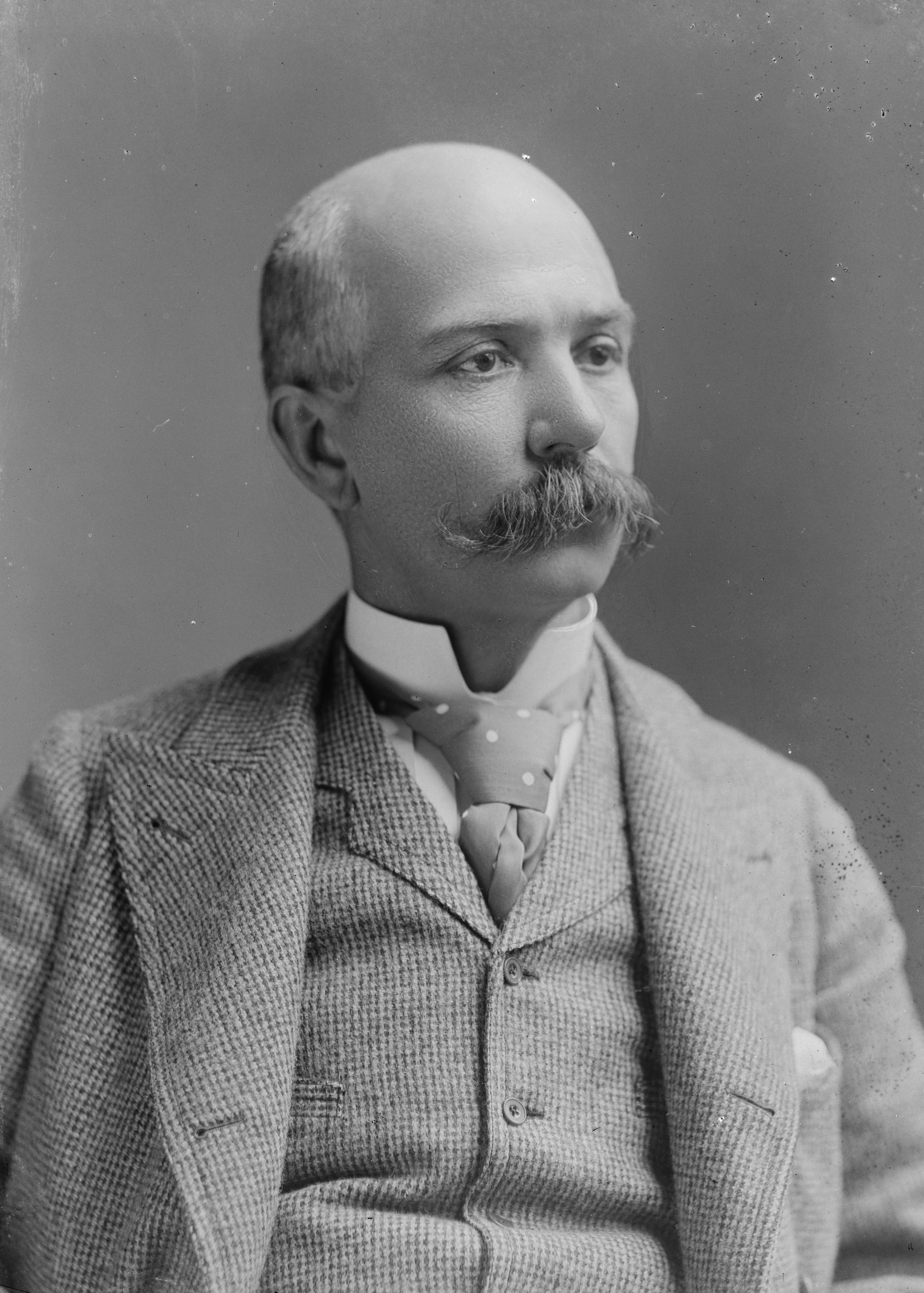
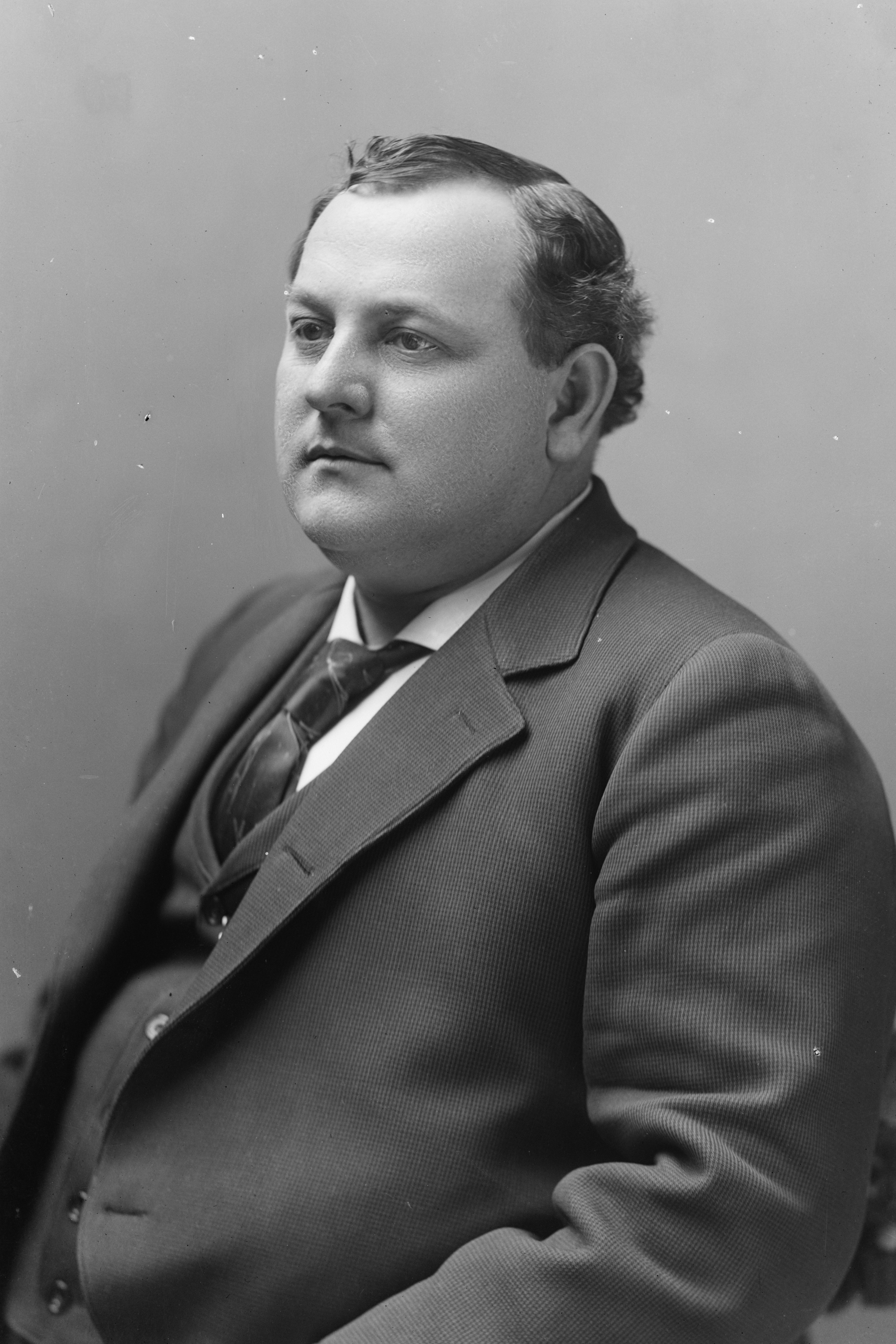
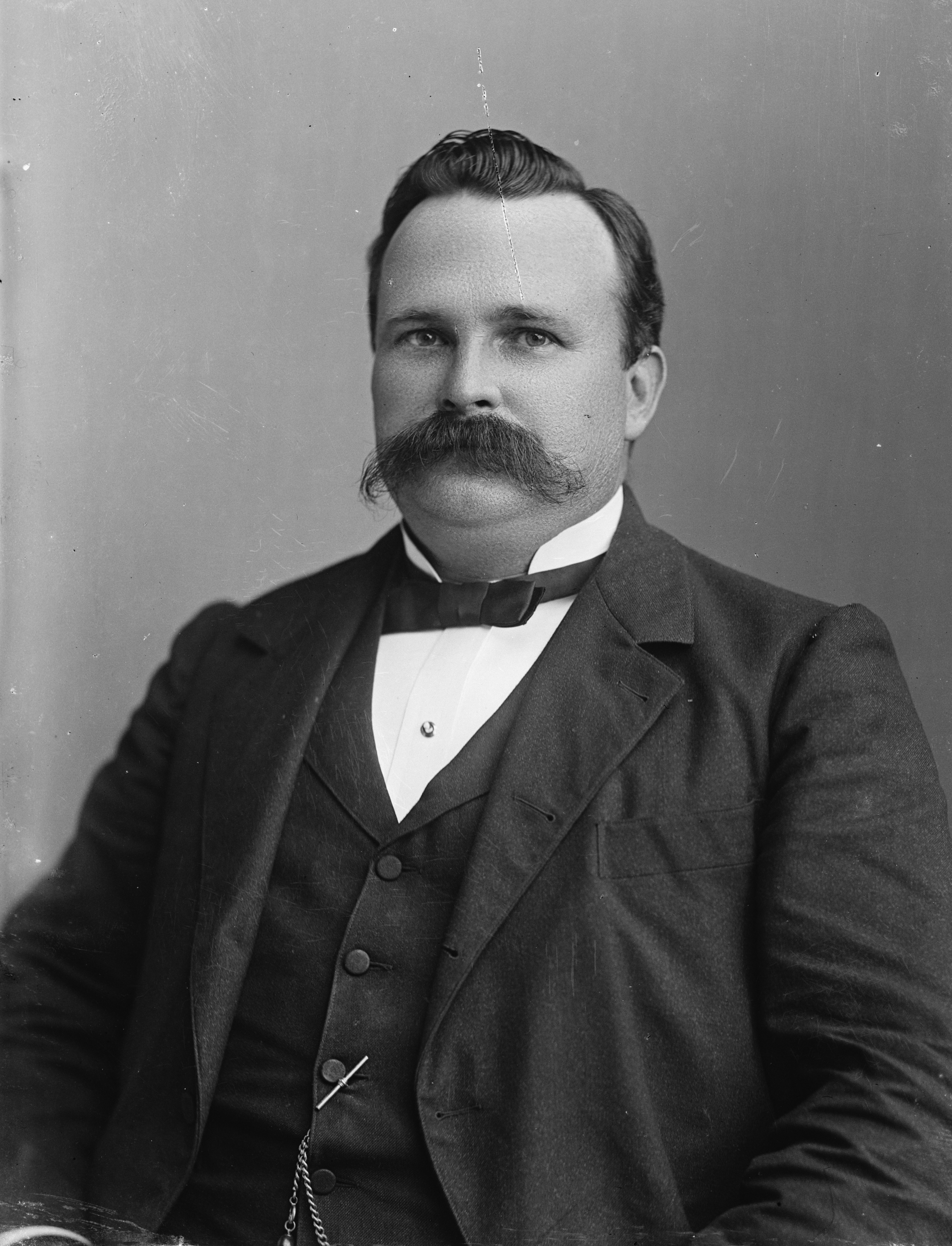
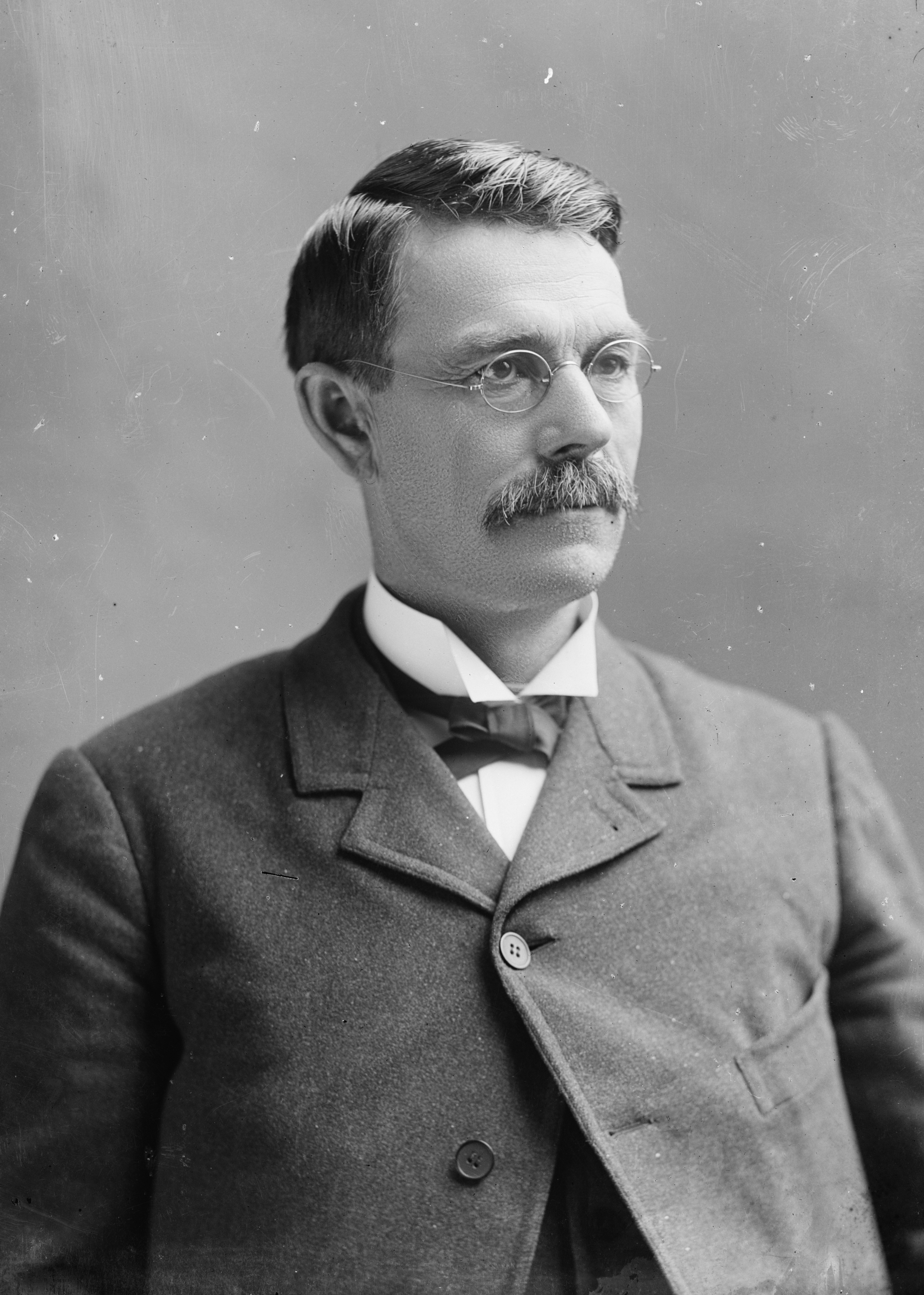
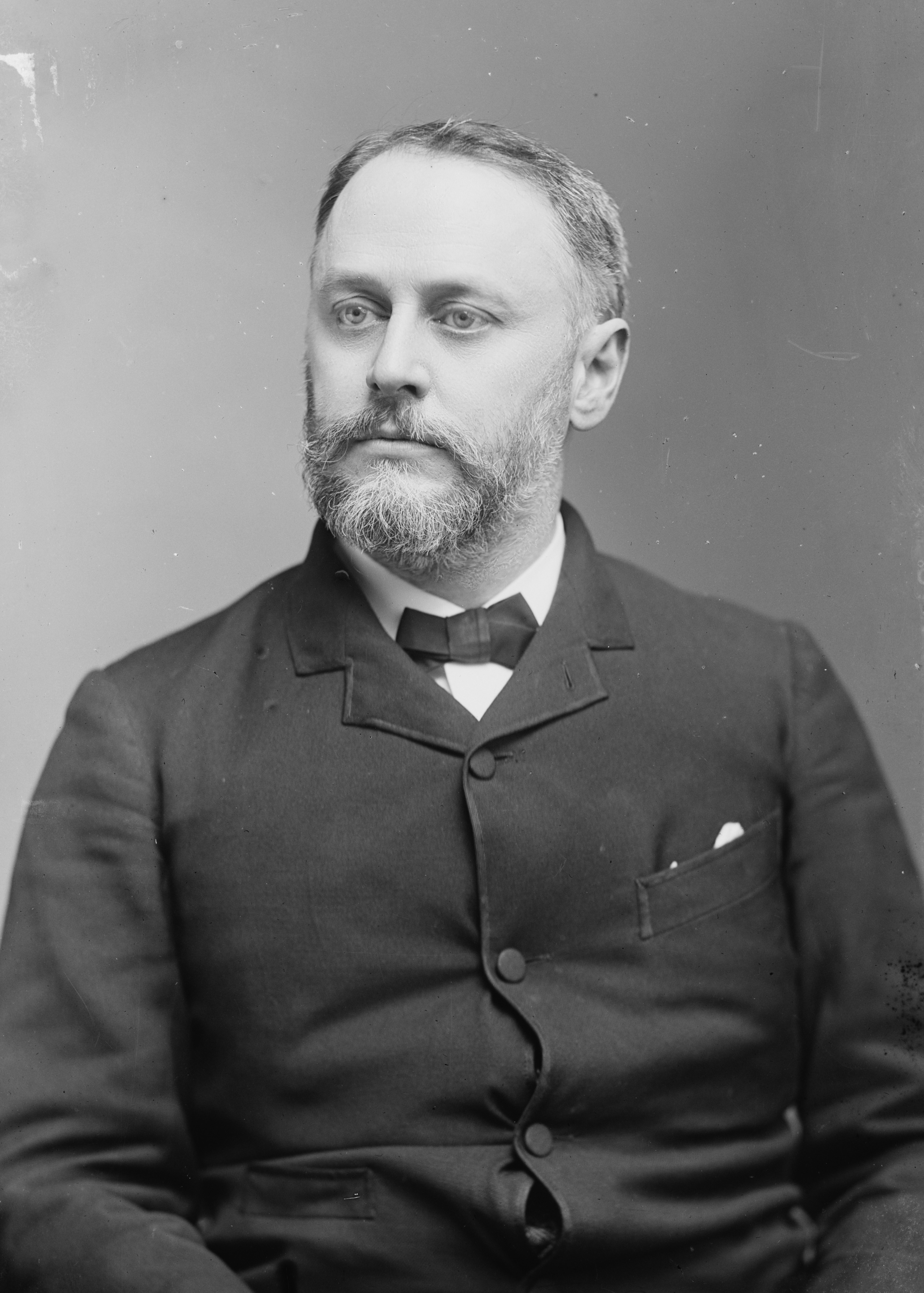
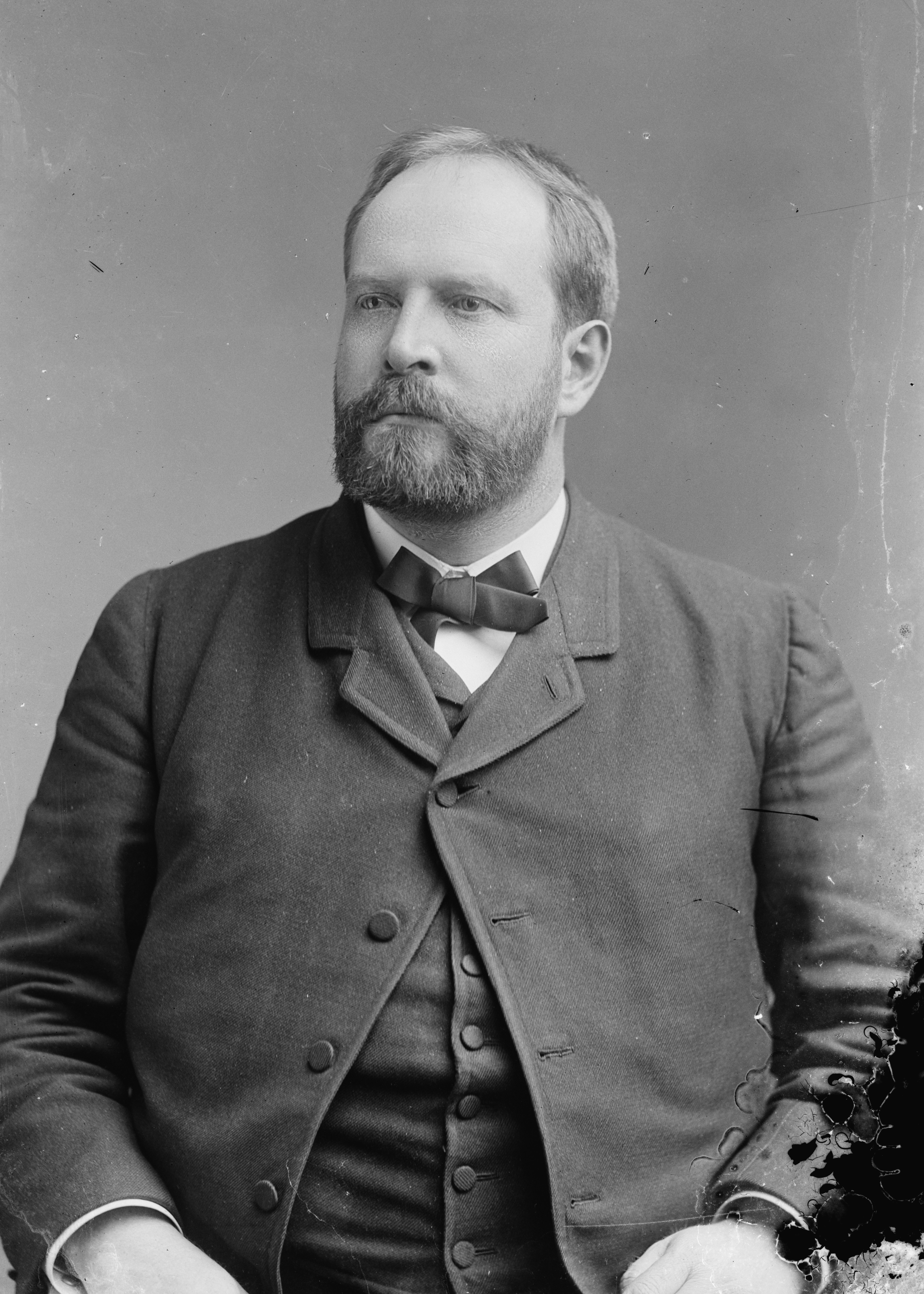
In 1894, six congressmen representing four states voted in favor of a single tax amendment to the Wilson–Gorman Tariff Act. They were, clockwise from top left:
Michael D. Harter of Ohio, Tom L. Johnson of Ohio, James G. Maguire of California, J. De Witt Warner of New York, Charles Tracey of New York, and Jerry Simpson of Kansas.

In the United Kingdom, George's writings were praised by emerging socialist groups in 1890s such as the Independent Labour Party and the Fabian Society, which each helped form the modern-day Labour Party. The Liberal government included a land tax as part of several taxes in the 1909 People's Budget intended to redistribute wealth (including a progressively graded income tax and an increase of inheritance tax). This caused a political crisis that resulted indirectly in reform of the House of Lords. The budget passed eventually—but without the land tax. In 1931, the minority Labour government passed a land value tax as part III of the 1931 Finance act, but the National Government repealed it in 1934 before it could be implemented.

In Denmark, the Georgist Justice Party has been represented in Folketinget. It formed part of a centre-left government in 1957–60 and was represented in the European Parliament in 1978–79. George's influence has waned, but Georgist ideas still occasionally emerge in politics. In the United States 2004 presidential election, third-party presidential candidate Ralph Nader mentioned George in his policy statements.

Economists still generally favor a land value tax. Monetarist economist Milton Friedman publicly endorsed the Georgist land value tax as the "least bad tax". Economist Joseph Stiglitz said: "Not only was Henry George correct that a tax on land is non-distortionary, but in an equilibrium society … tax on land raises just enough revenue to finance the (optimally chosen) level of government expenditure." He dubbed this proposition the Henry George theorem.

=== Communities ===
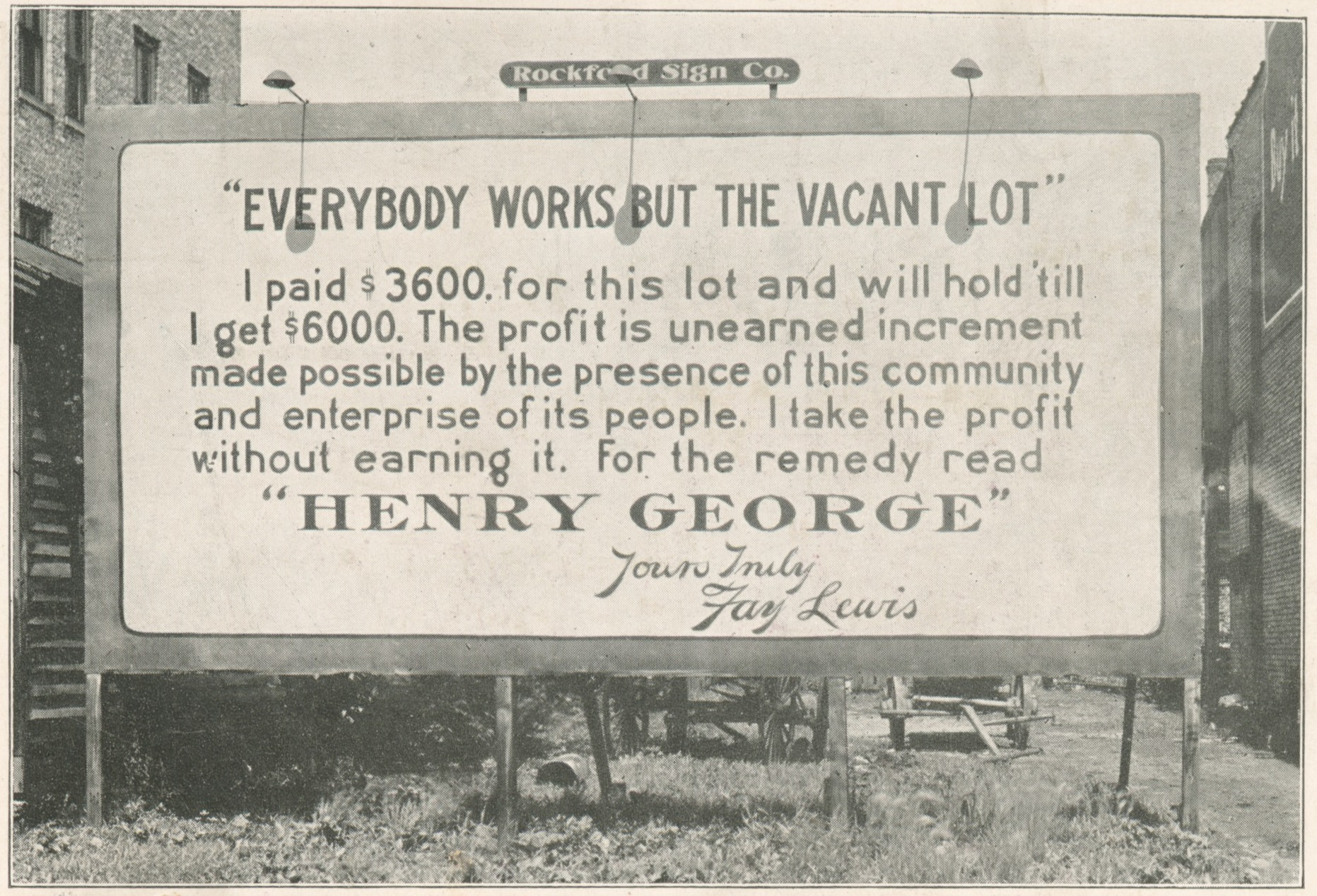
1914 billboard citing Henry George in Rockford, Illinois

Several communities were initiated with Georgist principles during the height of the philosophy's popularity. Two such communities that still exist are Arden, Delaware, which was founded in 1900 by Frank Stephens and William Lightfoot Price, and Fairhope, Alabama, which was founded in 1894 under the auspices of the Fairhope Single Tax Corporation. Some established communities in the United States also adopted Georgist tax policies. A Georgist in Houston, Texas, Joseph Jay "J.J." Pastoriza, promoted a Georgist club in that city established in 1890. Years later, in his capacity as a city alderman, he was selected to serve as Houston Tax Commissioner, and promulgated a "Houston Plan of Taxation" in 1912. Improvements to land and merchants' inventories were taxed at 25 percent of the appraised value, unimproved land was taxed at 70 percent of appraisal, and personal property was exempt. This was calculated using the Somers System. This Georgist tax continued until 1915, when two courts struck it down as violating the Texas Constitution in 1915. This quashed efforts in several other Texas cities towards implementing the Houston Plan: Beaumont, Corpus Christi, Galveston, San Antonio, and Waco.

The German protectorate of the Kiautschou Bay concession in Jiaozhou Bay, China, fully implemented Georgist policy. Its sole source of government revenue was the land value tax of six percent which it levied in its territory. The German colonial empire had previously had economic problems with its African colonies caused by land speculation. One of the main reasons for using the land value tax in Jiaozhou Bay was to eliminate such speculation, which the policy achieved. The colony existed as a German protectorate from 1898 until 1914, when seized by Japanese and British troops in World War I. In 1922, the territory was returned to the Republic of China.

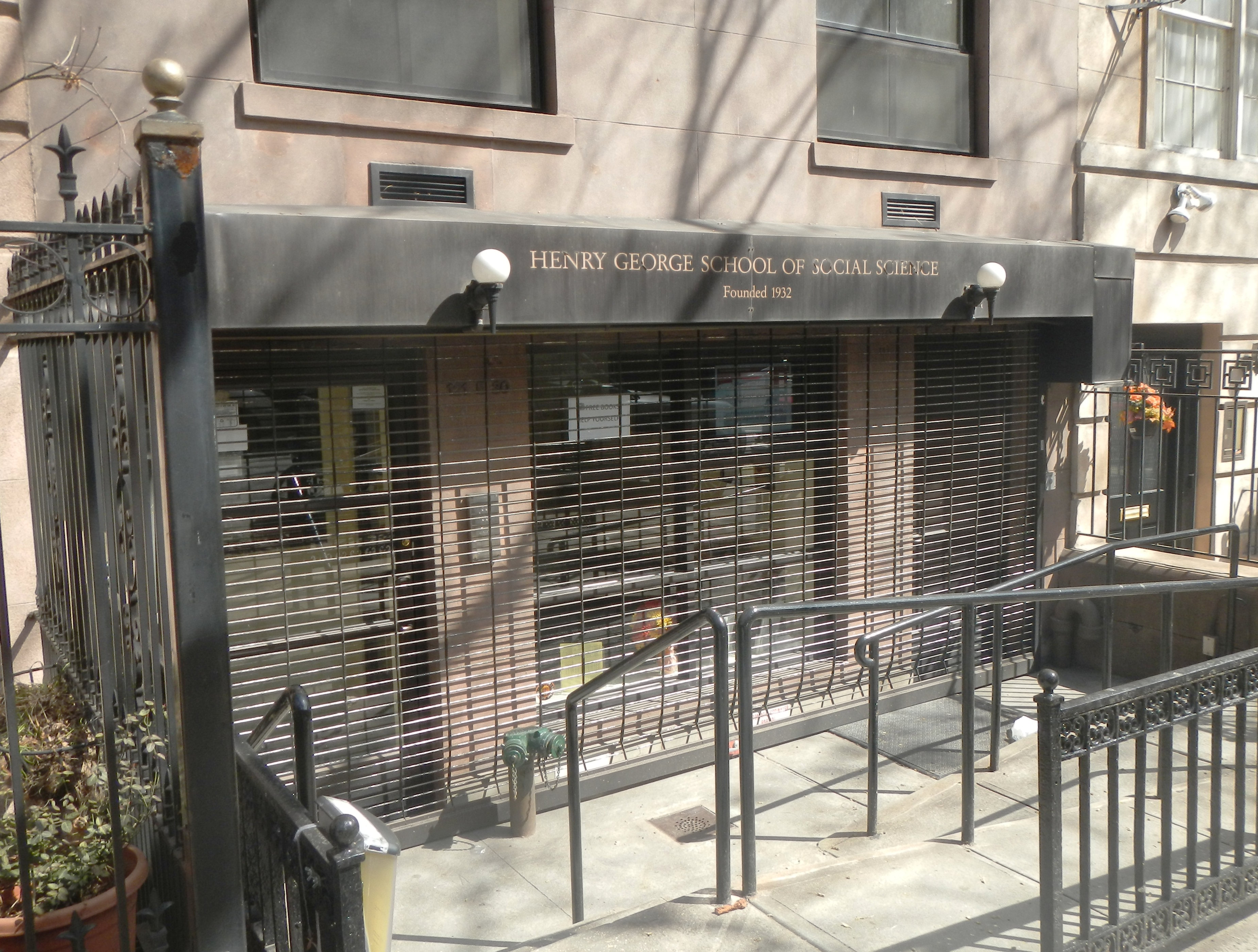
Henry George School of Social Science in New York City

Georgist ideas were also adopted to some degree in Australia, Hong Kong, Singapore, South Africa, South Korea, and Taiwan. In these countries, governments still levy some type of land value tax, albeit with exemptions. Many municipal governments of the United States depend on real-property tax as their main source of revenue, although such taxes are not Georgist as they generally include the value of buildings and other improvements. One exception is the town of Altoona, Pennsylvania, which for a time in the 21st century only taxed land value, phasing in the tax in 2002, relying on it entirely for tax revenue from 2011, and ending it 2017; the Financial Times noted that "Altoona is using LVT in a city where neither land nor buildings have much value".

In Taiwan, the Kuomintang implemented land reform policies that were influenced by Sun Yat-sen’s philosophy. This Georgist philosophy inspired by Henry George's single tax policy was implemented as a non-violent alternative to the land reforms of the People’s Republic of China (PRC). This policy was seen as a win-win compared to the land reforms of the mainland, as the Taiwanese government compensated landlords with industrial bonds rather than violently purging them. The success of the policy on the island prompted the Nationalist government to launch Operation Vanguard as an agricultural technical assistance program, which aided 20 African countries, including the Ivory Coast, as well as nations in Latin America and Asia by suggesting or advocating the policy of land reform to those nations.

In 2023, Detroit mayor Mike Duggan and Michigan State Representative Stephanie Young proposed replacing existing property taxes with a land-value tax. After the Great Recession and city's 2013 bankruptcy, speculators bought cheap property, expecting to profit from the city's recovery. This plan to shift the cost of municipal services to owners of empty land, while exempting community gardens and parks, will require approval from the Michigan Legislature and Detroit City Council before being added as a ballot measure for Detroit residents.

=== Institutes and organizations ===
The Shoshinsha mark emoji is used by Georgists online due to its resemblance to a yellow and green shield.

Various organizations exist that continue to promote George's ideas. According to The American Journal of Economics and Sociology, the periodical Land&Liberty, established in 1894, is "the longest-lived Georgist project in history". Founded during the Great Depression in 1932, the Henry George School of Social Science in New York offers courses, sponsors seminars, and publishes research in the Georgist paradigm. Also in the US, the Lincoln Institute of Land Policy was established in 1974 based on the writings of Henry George. It "seeks to improve the dialogue about urban development, the built environment, and tax policy in the United States and abroad".

Other major organizations include the Henry George Foundation, which continues to promote George's ideas in the United Kingdom. The IU, an international umbrella organization that brings together organizations worldwide that seek land-value tax reform. Prosper Australia, which has promoted George's ideas in Australia since the early 20th century. Common Ground USA, including its local chapters, and Common Wealth Canada, both of which are dedicated to spreading Georgist policies and views in their respective North American countries.

== Reception ==
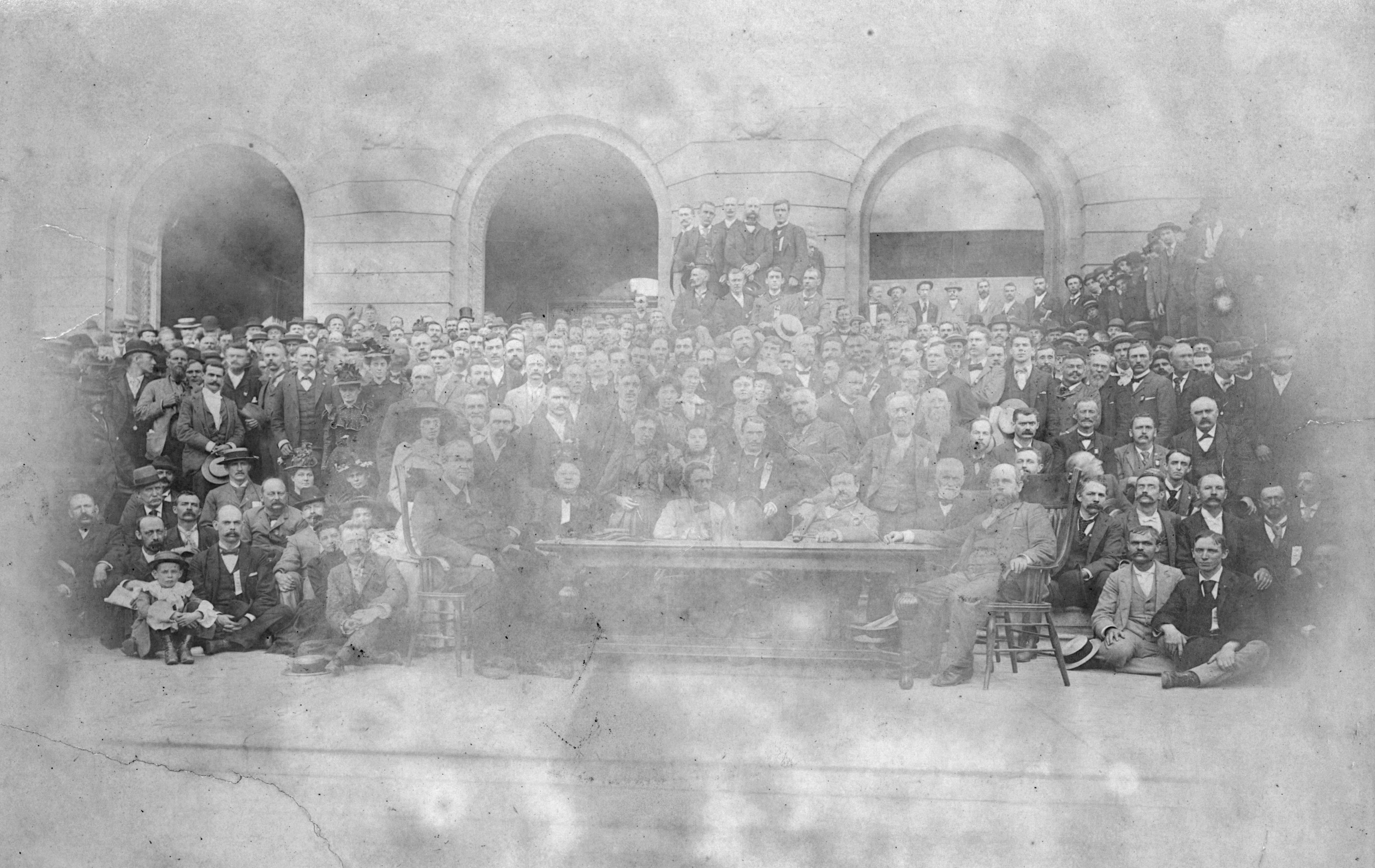
The first "Single Tax Conference," held in New York City in September 1890. Seated at the table are Edward McGlynn (far left), Louis F. Post (third from right), and George himself (far right).

The economist Alfred Marshall believed that George's views in Progress and Poverty were dangerous, even predicting wars, terror, and economic destruction from the immediate implementation of its recommendations. Specifically, Marshall was upset about the idea of rapid change and the unfairness of not compensating existing landowners. In his lectures on Progress and Poverty, Marshall opposed George's position on compensation while fully endorsing his ultimate remedy. So far as land value tax moderately replaced other taxes and did not cause the price of land to fall, Marshall supported land value taxation on economic and moral grounds, suggesting that a three or four percent tax on land values would fit this condition. After implementing land taxes, governments would purchase future land values at discounted prices and take ownership after 100 years. Marshall asserted that this plan, which he strongly supported, would end the need for a tax collection department of government. For newly formed countries where land was not already private, Marshall advocated implementing George's economic proposal immediately.

Karl Marx considered the single-tax platform as a regression from the transition to communism and referred to Georgism as "capitalism's last ditch". Marx argued, "The whole thing is ... simply an attempt, decked out with socialism, to save capitalist domination and indeed to establish it afresh on an even wider basis than its present one." Marx also criticized the way land value tax theory emphasizes the value of land, arguing that George's "fundamental dogma is that everything would be all right if ground rent were paid to the state."

In The Natural Economic Order through Free Land and Free Money, Silvio Gesell disagreed with George that land value taxes could solve the problem of land rent, as he believed that such taxes could be passed onto the tenants. Instead, he proposed nationalizing all land from current landowners, with the purchases financed by land bonds that would be paid over 20 years from revenues raised by leasing the purchased land through competitive bidding. This would achieve many of the intended effects of Georgism, but with compensation for previous landowners, and with no need to repeatedly reappraise land values. Landowners would no longer own their land, but they would be compensated through the bond payments and could obtain private possession of their land if they pay the leases. Gesell also criticized Henry George for supporting the fructification theory of interest and believing that Georgism would be sufficient to eliminate interest, economic crises, and unemployment.

Richard T. Ely agreed with the economic arguments for Georgism but believed that correcting the problem the way George wanted, without compensation, was unjust to existing landowners. Ely wrote, "If we have all made a mistake, should one party to the transaction alone bear the cost of the common blunder?"

John R. Commons supported Georgist economics but opposed what he perceived as an environmentally and politically reckless tendency for advocates to rely on a one-size-fits-all approach to tax reform, specifically, the "single tax" framing. Commons concluded The Distribution of Wealth, with an estimate that "perhaps 95% of the total values represented by these millionaire [sic] fortunes is due to those investments classed as land values and natural monopolies and to competitive industries aided by such monopolies", and that "tax reform should seek to remove all burdens from capital and labour and impose them on monopolies." However, he criticized Georgists for failing to see that Henry George's anti-monopoly ideas must be implemented with a variety of policy tools. Commons wrote, "Trees do not grow into the sky—they would perish in a high wind; and a single truth, like a single tax, ends in its own destruction." Commons uses the natural soil fertility and value of forests as an example of this destruction, arguing that a tax on the in-situ value of those depletable natural resources can result in overuse or over-extraction. Instead, Commons recommends an income tax-based approach to forests similar to a modern Georgist severance tax.

Other contemporaries such as Austrian economist Frank Fetter and neoclassical economist John Bates Clark argued that it was impractical to maintain the traditional distinction between land and capital and used this as a basis to attack Georgism. Mark Blaug, a specialist in the history of economic thought, credits Fetter and Clark with influencing mainstream economists to abandon the idea "that land is a unique factor of production and hence that there is any special need for a special theory of ground rent" claiming that "this is in fact the basis of all the attacks on Henry George by contemporary economists and certainly the fundamental reason why professional economists increasingly ignored him".

Robert Solow endorsed the theory of Georgism, while being wary of the perceived injustice of expropriation. Solow said that taxing away expected land rents "would have no semblance of fairness" but that Georgism would be good to introduce where location values were not already privatized or if the transition could be phased in slowly.

George has also been accused of exaggerating the importance of his "all-devouring rent thesis" in claiming that it is the primary cause of poverty and injustice in society. He argued that the rent of land increased faster than wages for labor because the supply of land is fixed. Modern economists, including Ottmar Edenhofer have demonstrated that George's assertion is plausible but was more likely to be true during George's time than now.

An early criticism of Georgism was that it would generate too much public revenue and result in unwanted growth of government, but later critics argued that it would not generate enough income to cover government spending. Joseph Schumpeter concluded his analysis of Georgism by stating that, "It is not economically unsound, except that it involves an unwarranted optimism concerning the yield of such a tax." Land use economists conclude that Schumpeter's criticism is unwarranted because the rental yield from land is likely much greater than what modern critics such as Paul Krugman suppose. Krugman agrees that land value taxation is the best means of raising public revenue but asserts that increased spending has rendered land rent insufficient to fully fund government. Georgists have responded by citing studies and analyses implying that land values of nations like the United States, the United Kingdom and Australia are more than sufficient to fund all levels of government.

Anarcho-capitalist political philosopher and economist Murray Rothbard criticized Georgism in Man, Economy, and State as being philosophically incongruent with subjective value theory, and further stating that land is irrelevant in the factors of production, trade, and price systems, but this critique is seen by some, including other opponents of Georgism, as relying on false assumptions and flawed reasoning.

Austrian economist Friedrich Hayek credited early enthusiasm for George with developing his interest in economics. Later, Hayek said that Georgism would be very strong if assessment challenges did not result in unfair outcomes, but he believed that they would.

Economists Bryan Caplan and Zachary Gochenour have argued that a 100% Georgist tax would destroy the incentive to search for natural resources and discover optimal locations for businesses, as the additional profits that would result from such discoveries would lead to a corresponding increase in the unimproved value of the land, and so be taxed away. Georgist economist Fred Foldvary has responded by arguing that Caplan and Gochenour rely on a confused definition of land that includes produced capital goods. If land does not include any produced capital goods and is merely an unproduced natural resource, then their claim that LVT is distortionary does not follow. Additionally, Caplan and Gochenour build on Frank Knight's critique of Georgism, which Foldvary claims has been refuted.

== List of Georgists ==
=== Economists ===
- Roger Babson
- Harry Gunnison Brown
- Stuart Chase
- John R. Commons
- Raymond Crotty
- Herman Daly
- Ottmar Edenhofer
- Mary Fels
- Michael Flürscheim
- Fred Foldvary
- Mason Gaffney
- Silvio Gesell
- Robert M. Haig
- Fred Harrison
- C. Lowell Harriss
- Max Hirsch
- J. A. Hobson
- Harold Hotelling
- Michael Hudson
- Wolf Ladejinsky
- Raymond Moley
- Edward J. Nell
- Thomas G. Shearman
- Donald Shoup
- Herbert A. Simon
- Joseph Stiglitz
- Taguchi Ukichi
- Nicolaus Tideman
- Thorstein Veblen
- William Vickrey
- Léon Walras
- Philip Wicksteed

=== Heads of government ===
- H. H. Asquith
- John Ballance
- Henry Campbell-Bannerman
- Chiang Kai-shek
- Winston Churchill
- Alfred Deakin
- Andrew Fisher
- George Grey
- Rutherford B. Hayes
- Billy Hughes
- Lee Jae Myung
- David Lloyd George
- Ramsay MacDonald
- Robert Stout
- Sun Yat-sen
- Wang Jingwei
- Trygve Slagsvold Vedum

=== Other political figures ===
- John Peter Altgeld
- Baldomero Argente
- Paddy Ashdown
- Warren W. Bailey
- Newton D. Baker
- Clitus Barbour
- Herbert S. Bigelow
- Louis Brandeis
- Willie Brown
- John Burns
- Clyde Cameron
- George F. Cotterill
- Robert Crosser
- Cunninghame Graham
- Frank de Jong
- Fred Dixon
- Francis Douglas
- Paul Douglas
- Charles R. Eckert
- Patrick Egan
- H. V. Evatt
- Seymour Farmer
- William Jay Gaynor
- Henry George Jr.
- Keir Hardie
- Michael D. Harter
- Arthur Henderson
- Daniel Hoan
- Frederic C. Howe
- Blas Infante
- Tom L. Johnson
- Samuel M. Jones
- John Seymour Keay
- Oscar Keller
- William Kent
- Ro Khanna
- Robert M. La Follette Jr.
- Franklin Knight Lane
- Andrew MacLaren
- James G. Maguire
- Richard McGhee
- Theodore L. Moritz
- Joaquim Nabuco
- Francis Neilson
- Joshua Nkomo
- George W. Norris
- Gerald Nye
- Patrick O'Regan
- Sydney Olivier
- Joseph Jay Pastoriza
- Hazen S. Pingree
- Jared Polis
- Louis F. Post
- Josiah Quincy VI
- Henry S. Reuss
- Thorold Rogers
- Edgar L. Ryder
- George A. Schilling
- Samuel Seabury
- James Sexton
- Jerry Simpson
- Philip Snowden
- L. D. Taylor
- Charles Tracey
- Charles Philips Trevelyan
- J. De Witt Warner
- Sidney Webb
- Josiah Wedgwood
- Chaim Weizmann
- John Henry Whitley
- Brand Whitlock
- William B. Wilson
- J. Stitt Wilson

=== Activists ===
- Mumia Abu-Jamal
- Charles Frederic Adams
- Jane Addams
- Peter Barnes
- Hubert Bland
- William Dwight Porter Bliss
- William F. Buckley Jr.
- Carrie Chapman Catt
- Henry Hyde Champion
- John Sherwin Crosby
- Clarence Darrow
- Michael Davitt
- Nellie Fassett
- Elizabeth and Alexis Ferm
- Sara Bard Field
- Samuel Gompers
- Bolton Hall
- Hubert Harrison
- Stewart Headlam
- Theodor Herzl
- Ami Mali Hicks
- John Haynes Holmes
- Ebenezer Howard
- Margrit Kennedy
- Martin Luther King Jr.
- Mary Elizabeth Lease
- Lizzie Magie
- Benjamin C. Marsh
- James Shaw Maxwell
- Edward McGlynn
- James Ferdinand Morton Jr.
- Albert Jay Nock
- Rolland O'Regan
- Thomas Mott Osborne
- Hugh O. Pentecost
- Amos Pinchot
- Terence V. Powderly
- George Lawrence Record
- Catherine Helen Spence
- Helen Taylor
- Norman Thomas
- William Simon U'Ren
- Ida B. Wells
- Frances Willard

=== Authors ===
- Charles Francis Adams Jr.
- Ernest Howard Crosby
- Arthur Desmond
- Charles Eisenstein
- Hamlin Garland
- James A. Herne
- Elbert Hubbard
- Aldous Huxley
- James Howard Kunstler
- Monteiro Lobato
- Edwin Markham
- José Martí
- William D. McCrackan
- Frank McEachran
- Kathleen Norris
- George Bernard Shaw
- Upton Sinclair
- Leo Tolstoy
- H. G. Wells
- Charles Erskine Scott Wood

=== Journalists ===
- Patrick Ford
- Timothy Thomas Fortune
- Harry Golden
- Michael Kinsley
- Suzanne La Follette
- Dylan Matthews
- George Monbiot
- William Marion Reedy
- Jacob Riis
- Charles Edward Russell
- Reihan Salam
- Lincoln Steffens
- Thomas Phillips Thompson
- Horace Traubel
- Martin Wolf
- Merryn Somerset Webb
- Tim Worstall
- Matthew Yglesias

=== Artists ===
- David Bachrach
- John Wilson Bengough
- Daniel Carter Beard
- Matt Bellamy
- George de Forest Brush
- Henry Churchill de Mille
- William C. deMille
- Walter Burley Griffin
- John Hutchinson
- George Inness
- Emma Lazarus
- Agnes de Mille
- Eddie Palmieri
- Banjo Paterson
- Louis Prang
- William Lightfoot Price
- Frank Stephens
- Frank Lloyd Wright

=== Scientists ===
- Albert Einstein
- Jakob Emanuel Lange
- Donald Murray
- Silvanus P. Thompson
- Alfred Russel Wallace

=== Businesspeople ===
- Sam Altman
- Vitalik Buterin
- Joseph Fels
- Henry Ford
- John C. Lincoln
- George Foster Peabody
- Rory Sutherland
- Fiske Warren
- Vivienne Westwood

=== Military ===
- William C. Gorgas
- Buckey O'Neill
- Raymond A. Spruance

=== Philosophers ===
- Salem Bland
- Ralph Borsodi
- Ludwig Büchner
- Nicholas Murray Butler
- Frank Chodorov
- John B. Cobb
- John Dewey
- Spencer Heath
- Leon MacLaren
- Franz Oppenheimer
- Walter Rauschenbusch
- Bertrand Russell
- Hillel Steiner
- Philippe Van Parijs
- Curtis Yarvin

== See also ==
- Agrarian Justice
- Agrarian socialism
- ATCOR
- Causes of poverty
- Classical economics
- Classical liberalism
- Diggers
- Excess burden of taxation
- Externality
- Feudalism
- Free-market environmentalism
- Freiwirtschaft
- Green economy
- Labor economics
- Laissez-faire
- Landed property
- Land law
- Land registration
- Land tenure
- Law of rent
- Land value tax
- Lockean proviso
- Manorialism
- Natural and legal rights
- Neoclassical liberalism
- Physiocracy
- Poverty reduction
- Radical centrism
- Tax shift
- Three Principles of the People
- Tragedy of the anticommons
- Wealth concentration
- YIMBY
