= Henry George theorem =

Economic theorem

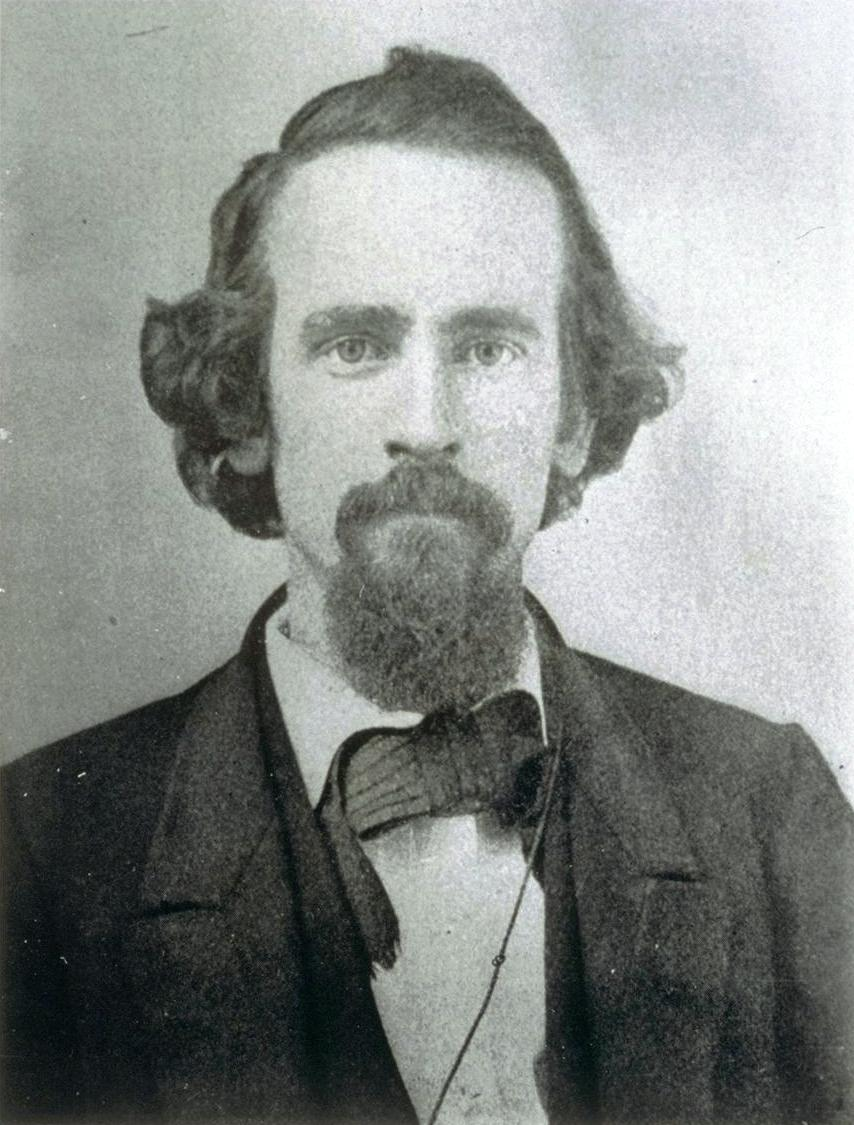
Henry George (1839-1897)

The Henry George Theorem (HGT) states that under certain conditions (mainly optimal city size), aggregate spending by government on public goods will increase aggregate rent based on land value (land rent) more than that amount, with the benefit of the last marginal investment equaling its cost. The theory is named for 19th-century U.S. political economist and activist Henry George. The HGT is a complementary function to ATCOR (All Taxes Come Out of Rent) and EBCOR (Excess Burden Comes Out of Rent).

== Theory ==
This general relationship, first noted by the French physiocrats in the 18th century, is one basis for advocating the collection of a tax based on land rents to help defray the cost of public investment that creates land values. Henry George popularized this method of raising public revenue in his works (especially in Progress and Poverty), which launched the 'single tax' movement.

In 1977, Joseph Stiglitz showed that under certain conditions, beneficial investments in public goods will increase aggregate land rents by at least as much as the investments' cost. This proposition was dubbed the "Henry George theorem", as it characterizes a situation where Henry George's 'single tax' on land values, is not only efficient, it is also the only tax necessary to finance public expenditures. Henry George had famously advocated for the replacement of all other taxes with a land value tax, arguing that as the location value of land was improved by public works, its economic rent was the most logical source of public revenue.

Subsequent studies generalized the principle and found that the theorem holds even after relaxing assumptions. Studies indicate that even existing land prices, which are depressed due to the existing burden of taxation on income and investment, are great enough to replace taxes at all levels of government.

Economists later discussed whether the theorem provides a practical guide for determining optimal city and enterprise size. Mathematical treatments suggest that an entity obtains optimal population when the opposing marginal costs and marginal benefits of additional residents are balanced.

The status quo alternative is that the bulk of the value of public improvements is captured by the landowners, because the state has only (unfocused) income and capital taxes by which to do so.

== Derivation ==
=== Stiglitz (1977) ===
The following derivation follows an economic model presented in Joseph Stiglitz’ 1977 theory of local public goods.

The resource constraint for a small urban economy can be written as:

$$Y = f(N) = cN + G$$

Where $Y$ is output, $f(N)$ is a concave production function, $N$ is the size of the workforce or population, $c$ is the per capita consumption of private goods, and $G$ is government expenditures on local public goods.

Land rents in this model are calculated using a 'Ricardian rent identity':

$$R = f(N) - f^\prime(N)N \;,$$

where $f^\prime(N)= dY/dN =$ marginal product of laborers.

The community planner wishes to choose the size of N that maximizes the per capita consumption of private goods:

$$c = \frac{f(N) - G}{N} \;.$$

Differentiating using the quotient rule yields:

$$\frac{dc}{dN} = \frac{Nf^\prime(N) - f(N) + G}{N^2} = 0$$

from which we derive first-order conditions:

$c = f^\prime(N) \; ,$

$G = f(N) - f^\prime(N)N \; ,$

$N^* = \frac{f(N) \;- \;G}{f^\prime(N)} \; .$

Comparison of the FOC for G and the Ricardian rent identity yields the equality:

$$R = G \; .$$

=== Arnott and Stiglitz (1979) ===
The following derivation follows a simplified version of an urban economic model presented in Richard Arnott and Joseph Stiglitz's paper titled Aggregate Land Rents, Expenditure on Public Goods, and Optimal City Size.

Assumptions

- A circular monocentric city.
- Identical residents.
- Identical technology.
- Homogenous land.
- Fixed lot size.
- All land is used.
- Linear transportation costs.
- Labor is the only factor.
- Production exhibits constant returns to scale.
- Normalized urban prices.
- No impure public goods
- No congestion.

The Model

In a monocentric city with the geometry of a two-dimensional circle, we wish to choose the population size $N$, the consumption of private goods per capita $C$, and the provision of pure public goods $P$ to maximize per capita utility $U(C,P)$, subject to the resource constraint:

$$NY = NC + \int_0^b \frac{1}{S}(tx)2\pi x\,dx + P \;,$$

where:
$S =$ lot size, or the consumption of land per resident,
$t =$ transportation cost incurred per unit distance,
$x =$ distance from urban center,
$b =$ the distance of the urban boundary from urban center.

The constraint suggests that output is divided between private goods, transportation services, and public goods.

Aggregate transportation costs $ATC$ is the integral of $\tfrac{1}{S}(tx)2\pi x$ because $\tfrac{1}{S}2\pi x\,dx$ residents inhabit a thin ring $2\pi xdx$ and pay $tx$ dollars to commute to the urban center to supply labor.

Since $NS$ units of land are consumed in a circle, then the urban radius is found by:

$$b = \bigg(\frac{NS}{\pi}\bigg)^{1/2} \;,$$

evaluating the constraint yields:

$$NY = NC + \frac{2t}{3}\bigg(\frac{S}{\pi}\bigg)^{1/2} N^{3/2} + P \;.$$

Let $m = \tfrac{2t}{3}\left(\tfrac{S}{\pi}\right)^{1/2}$ be a proportionality constant provided the absence of congestion externalities $\partial t/\partial N = 0$ and crowding/sprawl effects $\partial S/\partial N = 0$.

Formulate the Lagrangian:

$$\mathcal{L} = U(C,P) + \lambda\bigg(Y - C - mN^{1/2} - \frac{P}{N}\bigg) \;,$$

where $\lambda$ is the Lagrange multiplier.

The first-order conditions (FOCs) are:

$$\begin{align}
&{} N\;:\; \lambda\bigg(-\frac{m}{2}N^{1/2} + \frac{P}{N^2}\bigg) = 0\;, \\
&{} C\;:\; U_c - \lambda = 0\;, \\
&{}P\;:\; U_p - \frac{\lambda}{N} = 0\;.
\end{align}$$

Jointly, the FOCs with respect to $C$ and $P$ are version of the Samuelson condition, which states the sum of marginal rate of substitution $\tfrac{U_p}{U_c} \times N$ equals marginal rate of transformation (unity).

The FOC with respect to $N$ says the marginal resource cost from adding an additional resident (the increase in transportation costs per capita) equals the marginal benefit from sharing the cost of public goods across more residents.

Solving for $P$ gives:

$$P = \frac{m}{2}N^{3/2} = \frac{ATC}{2}\;.$$

Now we move to an upper-stage of the utility maximization problem where residents choose locations based on rents and transportation costs.

Imagine residents choose the consumption of land to maximize utility while subject to a budget constraint. The associated indirect utility function is:

$$V(x) = V\big(R(x),Y-tx\big)\;,$$

where $R(x)$ is lot rent per unit area at distance $x$ and $Y - tx$ is net income.

Spatial equilibrium occurs when variables adjust such that each resident can achieve the same level of utility anywhere.

Totally differentiating $V(x)$ and setting $V'(x) = 0$ gives:

$$\begin{align} V'(x) &{} = V_1 R\,'(x) - V_2 t = 0\;, \\
&{} \Rightarrow R\,'(x) = \frac{V_2}{V_1 }t\;.
\end{align}$$

By Roy's identity:

$$S = -\frac{V_1}{V_2} \;,$$

where $S = S\big(R(x),Y-tx)\big)$ is the Marshallian demand function for lot size at distance $x$, which we assume to be fixed with respect to distance.

Hence, the rent gradient (the rate at which rent changes with distance) is simply $R\,'(x) = -t/S$, implying the equilibrium rent charged at distance $x$ satisfies the linear equation:

$$R(x) = R(b) + \frac{t}{S}(b-x) \;,$$

this just says the reduction in transportation costs conferred by locating closer to the urban center is offset by the increase in rents, thus ensuring spatial indifference.

Integrating $R(x)-R(b)$ over the area of the city gives differential land rents:

$$\begin{align} DLR \,&{} \equiv\, \int_0^b \big[R(x)-R(b)\big]2\pi x\,dx \;,\\
&{} =\, \frac{m}{2}N^{3/2} \;.\end{align}$$

Comparing the expressions for $DLR$ and $P$ gives the Henry George theorem:

$$DLR = P \;.$$

== See also ==
- Georgism
- Value capture
