= Progress and Poverty =

1879 book by Henry George

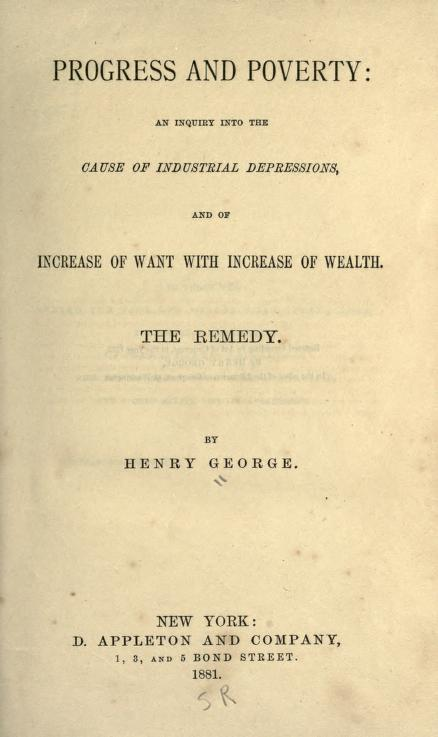
- Title page for Progress and Poverty: An Inquiry into the Cause of Industrial Depressions and of Increase of Want with Increase of Wealth: The Remedy (1881 edition)
- Author: Henry George
- Language: English
- Subjects: Capitalism, socialism, Georgism, tax policy, land, economic rent
- Publication date: 1879
- Publication place: United States
- Media type: Print (Hardback)
- Pages: 406
- ISBN: 1-59605-951-6
- OCLC: 3051331
- Text: Progress and Poverty at Wikisource

Progress and Poverty: An Inquiry into the Cause of Industrial Depressions and of Increase of Want with Increase of Wealth: The Remedy (P&P) is an 1879 book by social theorist and economist Henry George. It is a treatise on the questions of why poverty accompanies economic and technological progress and why economies exhibit a tendency toward cyclical boom and bust. George uses history and deductive logic to argue for a logical solution focusing on the capture of economic rent from natural resources and land titles.

Progress and Poverty, George's first book, sold several million copies, becoming one of the highest selling books of the late 1800s. It helped spark the Progressive Era and a worldwide social reform movement around an ideology now known as Georgism. Jacob Riis, for example, explicitly marks the beginning of the Progressive Era awakening as 1879 because of the date of this publication. The Princeton historian Eric F. Goldman wrote this about the influence of Progress and Poverty:

For some years prior to 1952 I was working on a history of American reform and over and over again my research ran into this fact: an enormous number of men and women, strikingly different people, men and women who were to lead 20th century America in a dozen fields of humane activity, wrote or told someone that their whole thinking had been redirected by reading Progress and Poverty in their formative years. In this respect no other book came anywhere near comparable influence.

Progress and Poverty had perhaps even a larger impact around the world, in places such as Denmark, the United Kingdom, Australia, and New Zealand, where George's influence was enormous. Contemporary sources and historians claim that in the United Kingdom, a vast majority of both socialist and classical liberal activists could trace their ideological development to Henry George. George's popularity was more than a passing phase; even by 1906, a survey of British parliamentarians revealed that his writing was more popular than Walter Scott, John Stuart Mill, and William Shakespeare. In 1933, John Dewey estimated that Progress and Poverty "had a wider distribution than almost all other books on political economy put together." Progress and Poverty was criticized by Karl Marx and Silvio Gesell for perceived flaws in its theory of capital and interest.

== Context ==
Progress and Poverty seeks to explain why poverty exists notwithstanding widespread advances in technology and even where there is a concentration of great wealth such as in cities. One day in 1871, George went for a horseback ride and stopped to rest while overlooking San Francisco Bay. He later wrote of the revelation that he had:

I asked a passing teamster, for want of something better to say, what land was worth there. He pointed to some cows grazing so far off that they looked like mice, and said, "I don't know exactly, but there is a man over there who will sell some land for a thousand dollars an acre." Like a flash it came over me that there was the reason of advancing poverty with advancing wealth. With the growth of population, land grows in value, and the men who work it must pay more for the privilege.

Furthermore, on a visit to New York City, he was struck by the apparent paradox that the poor in that long-established city were much worse off than the poor in less developed California.

George saw how technological and social advances (including education and public services) increased the value of land (natural resources, urban locations, etc.) and, thus, the amount of wealth that can be demanded by the owners of land from those who need the use of land. In other words: the better the public services, the higher the rent is (as more people value that land). The tendency of speculators to increase the price of land faster than wealth can be produced to pay has the result of lowering the amount of wealth left over for labor to claim in wages, and finally leads to the collapse of enterprises at the margin, with a ripple effect that becomes a serious business depression entailing widespread unemployment, foreclosures, etc.

George was in a position to discover this pattern, having experienced poverty himself, knowing many different societies from his travels, and living in California at a time of rapid growth. In particular he had noticed that the construction of railroads in California was increasing land values and rents as fast as or faster than wages were rising.

== Synopsis ==
The first two parts of the book argue against the Iron law of wages, provide George's definitions for labor, capital, and land, and criticizes Malthusianism in favor of Cornucopianism. George defines land as "all natural materials, forces, and opportunities", as everything "that is freely supplied by nature". The third part of the book draws upon the works of classical economists, including the law of rent and George's theory of wages. George also explains his theory of interest, which is similar to Anne Robert Turgot's theory of fructification, combined with a "reproductive or vital force of nature" for capital that can grow and reproduce.

The fourth and fifth parts of the book examine how population, technology, and land speculation affect the distribution of wealth. George concludes that land speculation is the root cause of recessions and that poverty persists despite increasing wealth since increases to productivity go to rent instead of wages.

George then examines various proposed strategies to prevent business depressions, unemployment and poverty, but finds them unsatisfactory. As an alternative, he proposes his own solution: a single tax on land values. The land value tax would be high enough to end other taxes, especially upon labor and production. Since public investment is reflected in land value, it could also provide limitless beneficial public investment in social services such as transportation and a citizen's dividend.

George argued that a land value tax would give landowners an incentive to use well-located land in a productive way, thereby increasing demand for labor and creating wealth. This shift in the bargaining balance between resource owners and laborers would raise the general level of wages and ensure no one need suffer poverty. A land value tax would, among other things, also end urban sprawl, tenant farming, homelessness, and the cultivation of low value monoculture on high value land. George provided his theory of human progress in the last part of the book.

== Excerpts ==
The following excerpt represents the crux of George's argument and view of political economy.

Take now ... some hard-headed business man, who has no theories, but knows how to make money. Say to him: "Here is a little village; in ten years it will be a great city—in ten years the railroad will have taken the place of the stage coach, the electric light of the candle; it will abound with all the machinery and improvements that so enormously multiply the effective power of labor. Will in ten years, interest be any higher?"

He will tell you, "No!"

"Will the wages of common labor be any higher; will it be easier for a man who has nothing but his labor to make an independent living?"

He will tell you, "No; the wages of common labor will not be any higher; on the contrary, all the chances are that they will be lower; it will not be easier for the mere laborer to make an independent living; the chances are that it will be harder."

"What, then, will be higher?"

"Rent, the value of land. Go, get yourself a piece of ground, and hold possession."

And if, under such circumstances, you take his advice, you need do nothing more. You may sit down and smoke your pipe; you may lie around like the lazzaroni of Naples or the leperos of Mexico; you may go up in a balloon or down a hole in the ground; and without doing one stroke of work, without adding one iota of wealth to the community, in ten years you will be rich! In the new city you may have a luxurious mansion, but among its public buildings will be an almshouse.

— Book V, Chapter II: "The persistence of poverty amidst advancing wealth"

An often-cited passage from Progress and Poverty is "The Unbound Savannah", in which George discusses how the building of a community increases the value of land.

== Impact ==
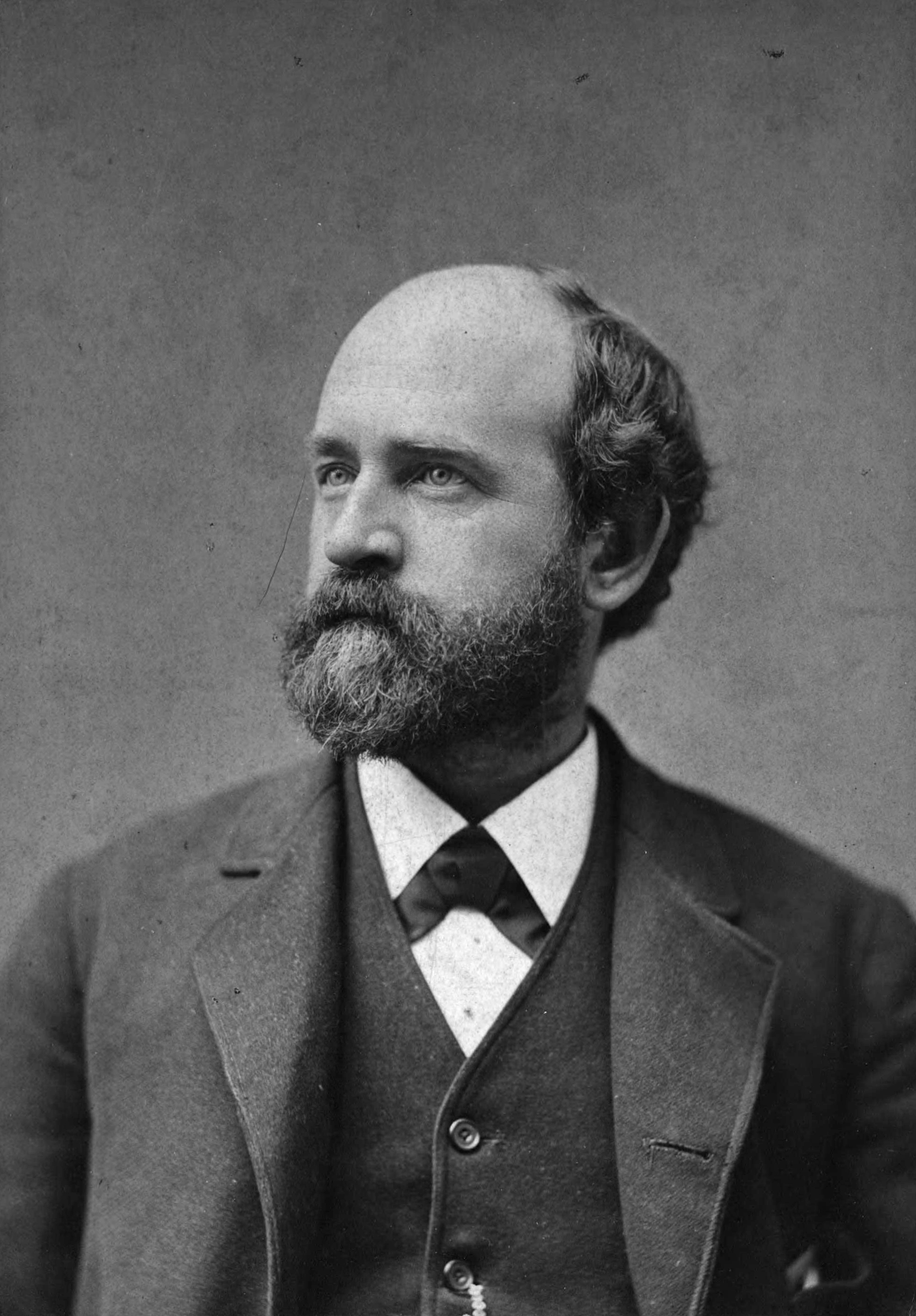
Portrait of George by I. W. Taber, taken shortly after writing Progress and Poverty

Soon after its publication, over three million copies of Progress and Poverty were bought, exceeding all other books written in the English language except the Bible during the 1890s. By 1936, it had been translated into thirteen languages and at least six million copies had been sold. It has now been translated into dozens of languages.

The book helped spark the Progressive Era and a worldwide social reform movement around an ideology now known as Georgism. Jacob Riis, for example, explicitly marks the beginning of the Progressive Era awakening as 1879 because of the date of this publication. The Princeton historian Eric F. Goldman wrote this about the influence of Progress and Poverty:

For some years prior to 1952 I was working on a history of American reform and over and over again my research ran into this fact: an enormous number of men and women, strikingly different people, men and women who were to lead 20th century America in a dozen fields of humane activity, wrote or told someone that their whole thinking had been redirected by reading Progress and Poverty in their formative years. In this respect no other book came anywhere near comparable influence.

Progress and Poverty had perhaps even a larger impact around the world, in places such as Denmark, the United Kingdom, Australia, and New Zealand, where George's influence was enormous. Contemporary sources and historians claim that in the United Kingdom, a vast majority of both socialist and classical liberal activists could trace their ideological development to Henry George. George's popularity was more than a passing phase; even by 1906, a survey of British parliamentarians revealed that the American author's writing was more popular than Walter Scott, John Stuart Mill, and William Shakespeare. In 1933, John Dewey estimated that Progress and Poverty "had a wider distribution than almost all other books on political economy put together."

== Notable recognition ==
After completing Progress and Poverty, George accurately wrote to his father: "It will not be recognized at first—maybe not for some time—but it will ultimately be considered a great book, will be published in both hemispheres, and be translated into different languages. This I know, though neither of us may ever see it here."

Emma Lazarus wrote, "Progress and Poverty is not so much a book as an event. The life and thought of no one capable of understanding it can be quite the same after reading it", and even that reading it would prevent such a person, who also "prized justice or common honesty", from being able to ever again "dine or sleep or read or work in peace". Many famous figures with diverse ideologies, such as George Bernard Shaw, H. G. Wells, and Leo Tolstoy, mark their first encounters with Progress and Poverty as life-changing experiences.

John Haynes Holmes wrote, "My reading of Henry George's immortal masterpiece marked an epoch in my life. All my thought upon the social question and all my work for social reform began with the reading of this book". He knew of "nothing more touching, in all the range of our American literature". Holmes also said that "Progress and Poverty was the most closely knit, fascinating and convincing specimen of argumentation that, I believe, ever sprang from the mind of man."

In 1930, during the Great Depression, George W. Norris entered an abridged version of Progress and Poverty into the Congressional Record and later commented that an excerpt from the book was "one of the most beautiful things" that he "ever read on the preciousness of human liberty".

Some readers have found George's reasoning so compelling that they report being unwillingly forced into agreement. Tom L. Johnson, a streetcar monopolist and future progressive reformer, read and reread Progress and Poverty, finally requesting assistance from his business associates to find flaws in George's reasoning. Johnson took the book to his lawyer and said, "I must get out of the business, or prove that this book is wrong. Here, Russell, is a retainer of five hundred dollars [about $17,900 in 2025]. I want you to read this book and give me your honest opinion on it, as you would on a legal question. Treat this retainer as you would a fee." Frank Chodorov, a pacifist libertarian of the American 'old right', claims to have read Progress and Poverty many times, and almost constantly for six months straight, before finally accepting George's conclusions. The literary critic Horace Traubel wrote that "George died in the charge of battle. But his book is battle spared. It has been in all battles and has survived all. Antagonism no longer has surprises for it."

Philip Wicksteed wrote that Progress and Poverty had opened "a new heaven and a new earth" and that it was "by far the most important work in its social consequences that our generation or century [1882] has seen". Alfred Russel Wallace later echoed this opinion when hailing Progress and Poverty as "undoubtedly the most remarkable and important book of the present century", placing it even above Darwin's On the Origin of Species. Nobel laureate Gary Becker said that Progress and Poverty was the first economics book he read, because Henry George "was famous in those days" and "influenced a lot of us in economics". Becker also said that the book was wonderful and had a lasting impact on his thinking. Ilya Tolstoy said that the book was a revelation to his father.

William Simon U'Ren wrote that he "went to Honolulu to die", but that a chance encounter with Progress and Poverty gave him a sense of purpose and renewed his desire to live. U'Ren went on to become a pioneering reformer of municipal elections and activist for direct democracy.

Clarence Darrow wrote that he had "found a new political gospel that bade fair to bring about the social equality and opportunity that has always been the dream of the idealist". Sara Bard Field wrote that Progress and Poverty was "the first great book I ever encountered", for how it impacted her thinking on poverty and wealth.

Albert Einstein wrote this about his impression of Progress and Poverty: "Men like Henry George are rare unfortunately. One cannot imagine a more beautiful combination of intellectual keenness, artistic form and fervent love of justice. Every line is written as if for our generation."

In the Classics Club edition forward, John F. Kieran wrote that "no student in that field [economics] should be allowed to speak above a whisper or write above three lines on the general subject until he has read and digested Progress and Poverty". Kieran also later listed Progress and Poverty as one of his favorite books. Michael Kinsley wrote that it is "the greatest economic treatise ever written".

After reading selections of Progress and Poverty, Helen Keller wrote of finding "in Henry George's philosophy a rare beauty and power of inspiration, and a splendid faith in the essential nobility of human nature". Father Edward McGlynn, one of the most prominent and controversial Catholic priests of the time, was quoted as saying, "That book is the work of a sage, of a seer, of a philosopher, of a poet. It is not merely political philosophy. It is a poem; it is a prophecy; it is a prayer."

Among many famous people who asserted that it was impossible to refute George on the land question were Winston Churchill, Leo Tolstoy, John Dewey, and Bertrand Russell. Tolstoy and Dewey, especially, dedicated much of their lives to spreading George's ideas. Tolstoy was preaching about the ideas in Progress and Poverty on his death bed.

In his 1946 foreword to Brave New World, Aldous Huxley writes "If I were to rewrite the book, I would offer the Savage ... the possibility of sanity ... where community economics would be decentralist and Henry-Georgian".

== Criticism ==
In The Natural Economic Order through Free Land and Free Money, Silvio Gesell disagreed with George that land value taxes could solve the problem of land rent, as he believed that such taxes could be passed onto the tenants. Instead, he proposed nationalizing all land from current landowners, with the purchases financed by land bonds that would be paid over 20 years from revenues raised by leasing the purchased land through competitive bidding. This would achieve many of the intended effects of Georgism, but with compensation for previous landowners, and with no need to repeatedly reappraise land values. Landowners would no longer own their land, but they would be compensated through the bond payments and could obtain private possession of their land if they pay the leases.

Gesell also criticized Henry George for believing that Georgism would be sufficient to eliminate interest, economic crises, and unemployment. Gesell believed that the fructification theory of interest endorsed in Progress and Poverty failed to discern the correct cause of interest, which Gesell instead attributed to liquidity preference.

Georgism was rejected by Karl Marx and his followers from the very beginning because, in their view, it ignores the ownership of the means of production and concomitant wage exploitation as the very root causes of inequality. Marx himself, upon receiving a copy of Progress and Poverty from Friedrich Sorge, wrote in 1881:

All these 'socialists' since Colins [i.e. including Henry George] have this much in common that they leave wage labour and therefore capitalist production in existence and try to bamboozle themselves or the world into believing that if ground rent were transformed into a state tax all the evils of capitalist production would disappear of themselves. The whole thing is therefore simply an attempt, decked out with socialism, to save capitalist domination and indeed to establish it afresh on an even wider basis than its present one.

== See also ==
- Land reform
- Henry George Theorem
- ATCOR: All Taxes Come Out of Rent
- EBCOR: Excess Burden Comes Out of Rent
- History of economic thought
