= Mason Gaffney =

American economist (1923–2020)

- Born: October 18, 1923; White Plains, New York, United States
- Died: July 16, 2020 (aged 96); Redlands, California, United States

Academic background
- Education: Harvard University; Reed College; University of California, Berkeley
- Influences: Henry George, Austrian School

Academic work
- Discipline: Public economics
- School or tradition: Classical economics
- Institutions: University of California, Riverside
- Notable ideas: ATCOR, EBCOR

Merrill Mason Gaffney (October 18, 1923 – July 16, 2020) was an American economist and a major critic of Neoclassical economics from a Georgist point of view. Gaffney first read Henry George's masterwork Progress and Poverty as a high school junior. This interest led him to Harvard University in 1941 but, unimpressed with their approach to economics he left in 1942 to join the war effort. After serving in the southwest Pacific during World War II he earned his B.A. in 1948 from Reed College in Portland, Oregon. In 1956 he gained a Ph.D. in economics at the University of California, Berkeley. There he addressed his teachers' skepticism about Georgism with a dissertation titled "Land Speculation as an Obstacle to Ideal Allocation of Land." Gaffney was Professor of Economics at the University of California, Riverside from 1976 onwards. He died in July 2020 at the age of 96.

== Career ==
Gaffney was a professor of economics at several universities; a journalist with TIME, Inc.; a researcher with Resources for the Future; the head of the British Columbia Institute for Economic Policy Analysis, which he founded; an economic consultant to several businesses and government agencies; and a frequent speaker on economic topics, domestic and foreign, and in political campaigns. He was elected as a Director of Robert Schalkenbach Foundation in 1984.

Gaffney had a wide and varied professional career. His professional positions included:

- University of Oregon 1953-54 Instructor
- North Carolina State University 1954-1958 assistant professor
- University of Missouri, 1958-62 associate professor and professor of agricultural economics
- University of Wisconsin-Milwaukee 1962-1969 professor of economics; department chair 1963–1965
- UCLA 1967- visiting professor of economics
- Resources for the Future, Washington, DC 1969-1973 senior research associate
- British Columbia Institute for Economic Policy Analysis, Victoria, B.C., 1973-1976 founder and director
- University of California, Riverside 1976-2012 professor of economics, teaching both managerial economics in the (Graduate School of Administration) and economics.

== Publications ==
Gaffney published many books and articles on public finance, land use, economics, taxation, and public policy. These include:

- Gaffney, M. Mason. Concepts of financial maturity of timber and other assets. (Raleigh: North Carolina State College, 1957).
- LAND: A Special Issue (of House and Home Magazine)
- Gaffney, Mason. Extractive Resources and Taxation: Proceedings (Madison: University of Wisconsin Press, 1967) (some pages available on Dr. Gaffney's personal site)
- Gaffney, Mason; Alaska Dept. of Natural Resources.; Alaska Legislature Interim Committee on Oil and Gas Taxation and Leasing Policy. Oil and gas leasing policy: alternatives for Alaska in 1977: a report. (1977)
- Gaffney, Mason (1994). Tideman, Nicholas (ed.). "Land as a Distinctive Factor of Production" (PDF). Land and Taxation. London: Shepheard-Walwyn.
- Gaffney, M. (1997). "What price water marketing?: California's new frontier". The American Journal of Economics and Sociology. 56 (4): 475–520. Archived from the original on November 13, 2007 – via FindArticles.
- Gaffney, M., Harrison, F., & Feder, K. The Corruption of Economics. (London: Shepheard-Walwyn (Publishers) Ltd., 1994) ISBN 0-85683-160-3 (hardback), ISBN 978-0-85683-244-4 (paperback). In this book, Gaffney shows how Neoclassical economics was designed and promoted by landowners and their hired economists to divert attention from George's extremely popular insight that since land and resources are provided by nature, and their value is given by society, they - rather than labor or capital - should provide the tax base to fund government and its expenditures.
- Gaffney, Mason. After the Crash: Designing A Depression Free Economy. (Malden, MA: Wiley-Blackwell (Publishers), 2009) ISBN 978-1-4443-3358-9 (hardback), ISBN 978-1-4443-3307-7 (paperback). This anthology of papers and essays by Gaffney provides a detailed explanation for the business cycle through a synthesis of Georgist, Austrian, and other schools of economic thought. It is both a pointed critique of Neoclassical economics and a prescription for a financial sector that is self-correcting, rather than crisis-prone. Includes introduction by editor Clifford Cobb. Available through the Robert Schalkenback Foundation in HardCover and Paperback .
