= Charles Frederic Adams =

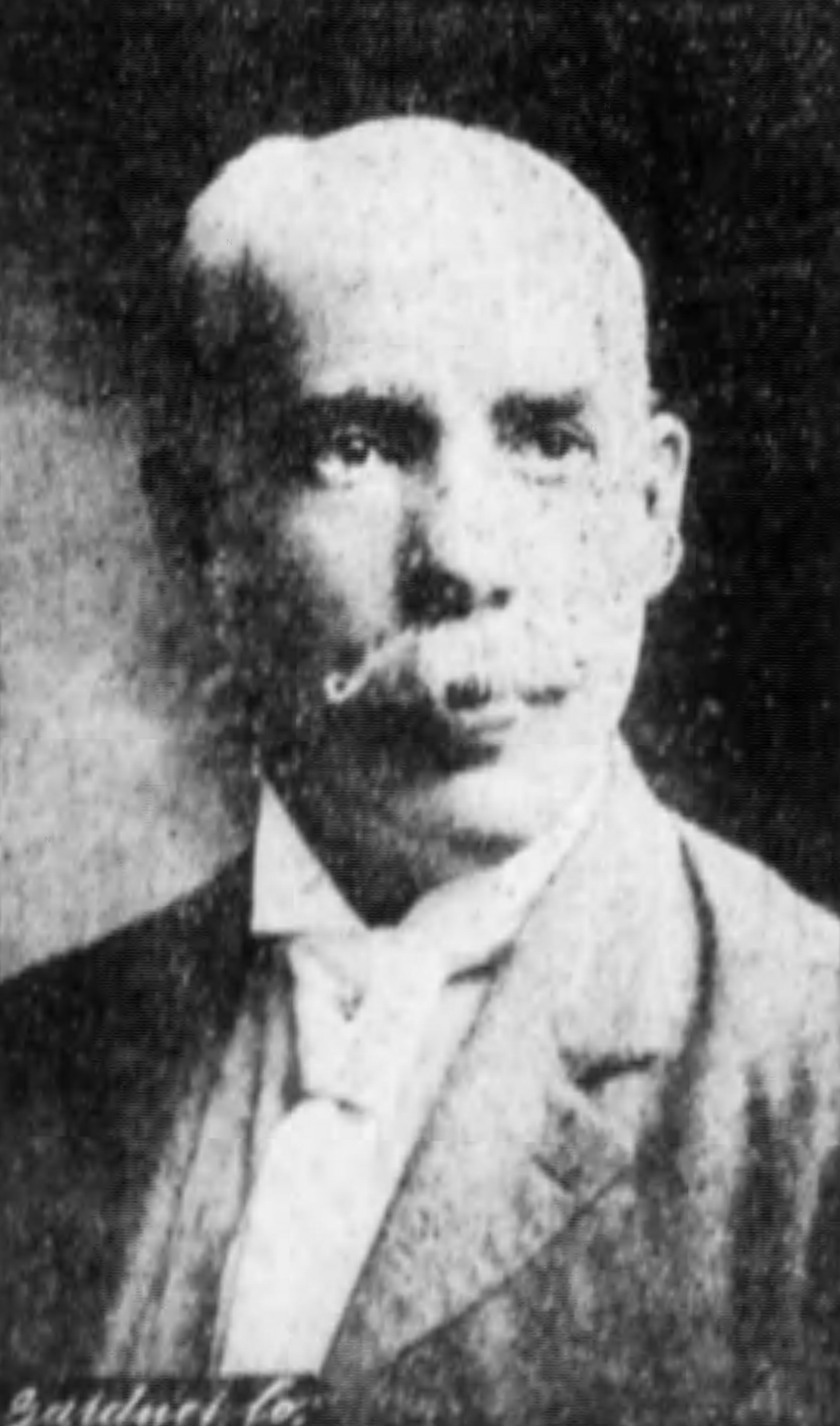
Adams c. 1906

Charles Frederic Adams (1851–1918) was an idealist and lawyer and who lived most of his adult life in Brooklyn, New York City. Besides his legal practice, he held, over time, several appointed positions in government. At the same time, he was a passionate lecturer and political reformer, and strong supporter of Henry George’s economic theory for having just a “single tax”.

== Family background and education ==
Charles Frederic Adams (also known as “Charles Frederick Adams”) was born in Santiago, Cuba, to William Newton Adams, a Virginian then serving as American Consul in Cuba, and Maria Del Carmen. Adams and Del Carmen met and married in Venezuela when Adams had a business there; they then moved to Cuba due to concerns about political instability. William Adams’ own father was a merchant in the West Indies. Navy Commodore John Thomas Newton was William's maternal uncle.

At age 10, Charles was sent to the U.S. for an education, and he studied at Brooklyn Polytechnic Institute. His father William rejoined his family in Brooklyn, New York, in 1865, going into business there. However, he lost substantial money in the financial “Panic” of 1873. Charles’ mother died in 1871. Charles’ father died on board a steamship, when travelling after retiring due to ill health.

In 1871, Adams graduated from Harvard Law School. Also included in his graduating class were Walter S. Logan, who later became president of the American Bar Association, and Patrick A. Collins, a future mayor of Boston.

== Law career ==
Charles Adams was admitted to the bar in New York bar in 1872, and served as a law clerk for Evarts, Southmayd & Choate. He was then hired by Coudert Brothers, an important firm that specialized for many years in international law.

In historically significant cases called the “Insular Cases”, Adams pleaded on behalf of Coudert Brothers before the U.S. Supreme Court. At issue was which, if any, protections of the United States Constitution automatically applied to territories such as Guam and Puerto Rico, which Spain had ceded to the United States.

== Government service career ==
Adams left his legal position at Coudert Brothers more than once over the course of his career, for opportunities to work in government. He went to Washington, D.C. in 1884, to work initially in the federal government's Civil Service Commission, as a Clerk. For a period, he was also Acting Chief Examiner. He then worked, under three successive Secretaries of the Interior, as a member of a law board related to hearing appeals. Next, in 1890, the Secretary of State appointed him Editor for the proceedings of the First Pan American Conference.

In 1892, Adams (who was now married) left Washington for Brooklyn, and returned to legal work for Coudert Brothers. That was the year he obtained the required standing to plead cases, on behalf of the firm, before the Supreme Court.

In 1905, he took another government position: a four-year term as Borough Secretary, for Brooklyn's Borough President Bird S. Coler. He resumed law practice again in 1910. Then finally, from 1914 until he died in office in 1918, he was Assistant Tax Commissioner for Brooklyn.

== Reform-minded causes ==
Charles Frederic Adams was frequently in the news and active in causes he cared about, whether through public speaking, writing letters to the editor, or joining political causes or parties. He avoided sticking to just one party, however, because he objected to excessive partisanship. One of his related causes was reforming the system of “political machines” and “bosses” in the established parties. He felt they unfairly determined, in back rooms, who could run for office, which limited choices of good candidates to vote for.

He also advocated, regularly, for having better financial supports for workers, if they retire or are injured. In 1878, he proposed a voluntary annuity system, called a “Working Man’s Tontine”. By 1904, he founded an organization based on that idea, which he called “The Brotherhood of the Commonwealth”. By 1919, that organization had reached about 2500 members.

Adams was also a long-time supporter, and friend, of economic reformer Henry George. George made the case, in an influential book called Progress and Poverty, that all land should ideally be “common property.” Where land is privately owned, he advocated taxing people based on the value of that land, itself, which they benefit from (as opposed to taxing buildings on the land or the goods produced on the land).

Supporters of that view became known as “Single Taxers”. Adams spoke regularly in support; including during a year of travel, from October 1910, for the Henry George Lecture Association.

Adams died of pneumonia in 1918, near the end of his term as Assistant Tax Commissioner.
