= HGT (disambiguation) =

HGT may refer to:

- Harrogate railway station, England
- Henry George theorem, an economic theorem about land rents and government spending on public goods
- Holland's Got Talent, a Dutch television show
- Horizontal gene transfer, non-hereditary genetic changes
- Hyper geometric test, in statistics
- Harlem Globetrotters, an American exhibition basketball team
