= Eric F. Goldman =

American historian (1916–1989)

Eric Frederick Goldman PhD
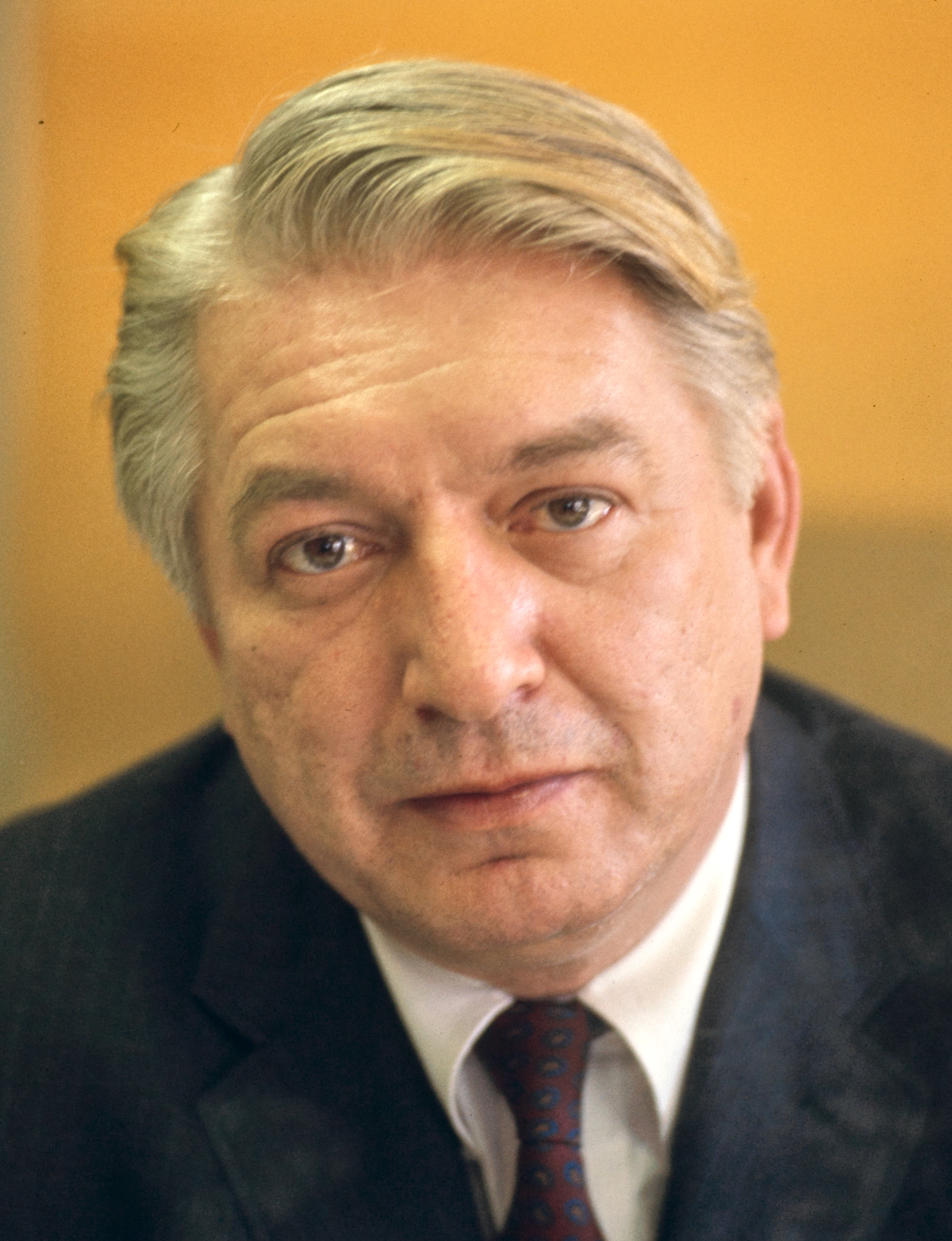
- Goldman in the 1970s
- Born: June 17, 1916; Washington, D.C., U.S.
- Died: February 19, 1989 (aged 72); Princeton, New Jersey, U.S.
- Education: Johns Hopkins University
- Occupations: Historian, professor, and Presidential advisor
- Years active: 1942-1989
- Employer: Princeton University
- Notable work: Rendezvous with Destiny: A History of Modern American Reform; The Tragedy of Lyndon Johnson
- Television: The Open Mind (1959-1967)
- Spouse: Joanna R. Jackson
- Awards: Guggenheim Fellowship; Bancroft Prize (1953)

Eric Frederick Goldman (June 17, 1916 – February 19, 1989) was an American historian, Rollins Professor of History at Princeton University, and Presidential advisor.

== Life ==
Born in Washington, D.C., United States, he was educated in public schools in Baltimore, Maryland, and graduated from Johns Hopkins University with a Ph.D. in history at age 22. He wrote on national affairs for Time magazine. He joined Princeton University as an assistant professor in 1942. He became a full professor in 1955, until retirement in 1985. He was special advisor to President Lyndon B. Johnson from 1963 to 1966. He served as president of the Society of American Historians from 1962 to 1969. From 1959 to 1967, he was the moderator of the public affairs show The Open Mind, on NBC.

He married Joanna R. Jackson (died 1980). His papers are held at the Library of Congress, and the University of California, Los Angeles.

== Writings ==
Goldman's most influential work appeared in 1952: Rendezvous with Destiny: A History of Modern American Reform, covering reform efforts from the Grant Administration into the Truman years. For decades it was a staple of the undergraduate curriculum in history, highly regarded for its style and its exposition of modern American liberalism. According to Priscilla Roberts:

Lively, well-written, and highly readable, it provided an overview of eight decades of reformers, complete with arresting vignettes of numerous individuals, and stressed the continuities among successful American reform movements. Writing at the height of the Cold War, he also argued that the fundamental liberal tradition of the United States was moderate, centrist, and incrementalist, and decidedly non-socialist and non-totalitarian. While broadly sympathetic to the cause of American reform, Goldman was far from uncritical toward his subjects, faulting progressives of World War I for their lukewarm reception of the League of Nations, American reformers of the 1920s for their emphasis on freedom of lifestyles rather than economic reform, and those of the 1930s for overly tolerant attitude toward Soviet Russia. His views of past American reformers encapsulated the conventional, liberal, centrist orthodoxy of the early 1950s, from its support for anti-communism and international activism abroad and New Deal-style big government at home, to its condemnation of McCarthyism.

== Awards ==
- 1953 Bancroft Prize
- 1962; 1966 Emmy

== Works ==
- "The White House and the intellectuals", Harper's January 1969
- Rendezvous With Destiny: A History of Modern American Reform, Knopf, 1952 (reprint 25th Anniversary Edition, Vintage, 1977, Ivan R. Dee, 2001, ISBN 978-1-56663-369-7)
- The Crucial Decade, America 1945-55, Knopf, 1956
- The Crucial Decade - And After, America 1945-60, Vintage Books, 1961, ISBN 978-0-394-70183-7
- The Tragedy of Lyndon Johnson, Knopf, 1969
- John Bach McMaster, American Historian, Philadelphia, University of Pennsylvania press; 1943.
