= C. Lowell Harriss =

American professor and economist (1912–2009)

Clement Lowell Harriss (1912–2009) was an American economist, a past president of the National Tax Association and a former executive director of the Academy of Political Science. He was one of the United States' leading tax experts and the author of highly regarded economics textbooks and other books on economic subjects. He was professor emeritus of economics at Columbia University and taught there for 43 years. He was the professor for whom the C. Lowell Harriss Professorship of Economics and International Affairs at the School of International and Public Affairs at Columbia was named.

== Early life ==
Harriss was born in Fairbury, Nebraska. He was the son of Riley Clement Harriss and Alice Mary Hunt. He was a summa cum laude graduate of Harvard. Upon graduating from Harvard, he was awarded a Sheldon Fellowship which funded his travel for 13 months throughout Europe, Turkey, the Balkans, and Northern Africa. He arrived in Berlin the day Hitler began his presidency. He also undertook graduate study at the University of Chicago and earned a Ph.D. from Columbia University.

== Teaching career ==
In addition to his long affiliation with Columbia University, Harriss taught at Stanford University, the University of California at Berkeley, Princeton University, and Yale. He also held posts at the Wharton School, the New School for Social Research and Pace University. He accepted the posthumous 1996 Nobel Prize in Economics for his colleague at Columbia, William Vickrey, because the announcement of the prize occurred just three days before Vickrey died. Vickrey had been awarded the prize along with James Mirrlees for research on the economic theory of incentives.

== Professional associations ==
He was a member of the American Economic Association, the Mont Pelerin Society and the Royal Economic Society. In 1979 he served on the board of directors of the Institute for Research on the Economics of Taxation. He was a past president of the National Tax Association. He was executive director (1981–87) of the Academy of Political Science. He worked as a consultant to both the U.S. Treasury and the Agency for International Development.

== Personal ==
On June 1, 1936, he married Agnes Bennett Murphy, and they had two daughters and two sons. He served in the U.S. Air Corps (1943–1946). His party affiliation was Republican. He was a member of the University Club of New York and Philadelphia Society. Agnes Harriss predeceased her husband in 1992.

== Death and legacy ==
Harriss died of natural causes on December 14, 2009, at his home in Bronxville, New York, at the age of 97. He was one of the few remaining economists to have experienced the American Great Depression. Writing for Fortune shortly after Harriss's death, Ben Stein recalled that Harriss had been one of his most influential professors at Columbia. Stein wrote that "a huge amount of what is my stock in trade as an economist and writer about economics came from that man."

The American Institute for Economic Research established a memorial scholarship program in his honor to be "given to enrolled students who have demonstrated innovative and creative accomplishments in businesses they are operating while attending college." The Lincoln Institute of Land Policy, where Harriss had served on the board of directors, established a dissertation fellowship program in his name.

He was awarded the Daniel M. Holland Medal by the NTA in 1998.

== Books ==
Gift Taxation in the U.S. (1940)

History and Policies of the Home Owners Loan Corporation (1951)

The American Economy: Principles, Practices, Policies (1953)

The Good Earth of America (1974)

Money and Banking (1961)

Economics (1966)

Constitutional Restrictions on Property Taxing and Borrowing Powers In New York (1967)

Innovations in Tax Policy and Other Essays (1972)

Inflation: Long-Term Problems (1973)

Government Spending and Land Values (1973)

The Property Tax and Local Finance (1983)

The Control of Federal Spending (1985)
