= Single tax =

Tax system based on one form of taxation

A single tax is a system of taxation based mainly or exclusively on one tax, typically chosen for its special properties, often being a tax on land value.

== Land value tax ==
In the late 1800s and early 1900s, a populist single-tax movement emerged that sought to levy a single tax on the rental value of land and natural resources, but for somewhat different reasons. This "Single Tax" movement later became known as Georgism, named after its most famous proponent, Henry George. It proposed a simplified and equitable tax system that upholds natural rights and whose revenue is based exclusively on ground and natural resource rents, with no additional taxation of improvements such as buildings.

Geo-libertarians advocate land value capture as a consistently ethical and non-distortionary means to fund the essential operations of government, with the surplus rent being distributed as a guaranteed basic income. This is traditionally called the citizen's dividend, which is intended to compensate members of society who have been deprived by legal title of an equal share of the earth's spatial value and equal access to natural opportunities.

Related taxes derived in principle from the land value tax include Pigouvian taxes to internalize the external costs of pollution more efficiently than litigation, as well as severance taxes on raw material extraction to regulate the depletion of unreplenishable natural resources and to prevent irreparable damage to valuable ecosystems through unsustainable practices such as overfishing.

== Income and consumption taxes ==
Pierre Le Pesant, sieur de Boisguilbert and Sébastien Le Prestre de Vauban were early advocates for a single tax, but, rejecting the claim that land has certain economic properties which make it uniquely suitable for taxation, they instead proposed a flat tax on all incomes.

There have been other proposals for a single tax concerning property, goods, or income. Others have made proposals for a single tax based on other revenue models, such as the FairTax proposal for a consumption tax and various flat tax proposals on personal incomes.

== See also ==
- Market distortion
- Optimal tax
- Proportional tax
- Single tax parties:
  - Henry George Justice Party (Australia)
  - Justice Party of Denmark
  - Single Tax League (Australia)
- Tax equity
- Tax incidence
- Tax reform
- Tax shift
