= Land (economics) =

Use of land as capital for production

In economics, land comprises all naturally occurring resources as well as geographic land. Examples include particular geographical locations, mineral deposits, forests, fish stocks, atmospheric quality, geostationary orbits, and portions of the electromagnetic spectrum. Supply of these resources is fixed.

== Factor of production ==
Land is considered one of the three factors of production (also sometimes called the three producer goods) along with capital, and labor. Natural resources are fundamental to the production of all goods, including capital goods. While the particular role of land in the economy was extensively debated in classical economics, it played a minor role in the neoclassical economics dominant in the 20th century. Income derived from ownership or control of natural resources is referred to as rent.

== Ownership ==
Because no man created the land, it has no definite original proprietor, owner, or user.

No man made the land. It is the original inheritance of the whole species.

— John Stuart Mill

Consequently, conflicting claims on geographic locations and mineral deposits have historically led to disputes over their economic rent and contributed to many civil wars and revolutions.

In the context of geographic locations the resulting conflict is regularly understood as the land question (see e.g. United Kingdom, South Africa, Canada).

== Addressing the land question ==
=== Land reform ===
Ownership of agricultural land and its distribution among the population is a key driver of a wide range of social, political and economic inequalities. Land reform (also known as agrarian reform) refers to the process of changing who owns agricultural land and who has the right to use these lands. Redistributive land reform refers to the narrower concept of transferring agricultural land ownership from large private landowners to small farmers and people without any landholdings. It involves the redistribution of wealth and political power that comes from owning large swathes of land. There are different types of land reform, including state-led and market-led agrarian reforms.

=== Georgism ===
Georgists hold that this implies a perfectly inelastic supply curve (i.e., zero elasticity), suggesting that a land value tax that recovers the rent of land for public purposes would not affect the opportunity cost of using land, but would instead only decrease the value of owning it. This view is supported by evidence that, although land can come on and off the market, market inventories of land show, if anything, an inverse relationship to price (i.e., negative elasticity).

== Significance ==
Land plays a vital role in advanced economies. In the UK, the "non-produced asset of land" accounts for 51% of the country's total net worth, implying that it plays a more critical role in the economy than capital.

== Academic ==
Some United Kingdom and Commonwealth universities offer courses in land economy, in which economics is studied alongside law, business regulation, surveying, and the built and natural environments. This mode of study at Cambridge dates back to 1917 when William Cecil Dampier suggested the creation of a school of rural economy at the university.

== Accounting ==
As a tangible asset, land is represented in accounting as a fixed asset or a capital asset.

== Sustainability ==
The sustainable use of land is the focus of some economic theories.

== See also ==
- Citizen's dividend – Georgist proposed policy
- Economics of Land Degradation Initiative – Global initiative for sustainable land management
- Factors of production – Resources used in the production process
- Land consumption – Expansion of built-up area
- Land monopoly – Ownership of land in a particular area by a small number of people or organizations
- Land reform – Changing of laws, regulations, or customs regarding land ownership
- Land value tax – Levy on the unimproved value of land
- Means of production – Inputs used in the production of goods and services with economic value
- Magic: The Gathering#Luck vs. skill – Collectible card game
- Natural resource economics – Supply, demand and allocation of the Earth's natural resources
- Property rights (economics) – Economics concept
- Real estate appraisal – Process of developing an opinion of value for real property
- Social metabolism – Study of materials and energy flows between nature and society
