= Sherwin =

Sherwin may refer to:

Surname:

- A. N. Sherwin-White (1911–1993), British historian of Ancient Rome
- Adam Sherwin, journalist and a former media correspondent for The Times between 1999 and 2010
- Amy Sherwin (1855–1935), the 'Tasmanian Nightingale', an Australian soprano singer
- Arthur Sherwin (1879–1947), English cricketer who played first-class cricket for Derbyshire
- Belle Sherwin (1869–1955), American Women's rights activist
- Brent Sherwin (born 1978), Australian professional rugby league player
- Brian Sherwin (born 1980), American art critic, writer, and blogger with a degree from Illinois College
- Byron Sherwin, Jewish scholar and author with expertise in theology, inter-religious dialogue, mysticism and Jewish ethics
- Charles Sherwin (1877–1950), English cricketer who played first-class cricket for Derbyshire
- David Sherwin (born 1942), British screenwriter
- Derrick Sherwin (1936–2018), British television producer, writer, and actor
- Emily Sherwin, American law professor
- Frank Sherwin (politician) (1905–1981), Irish independent politician
- Frank Sherwin (artist), remembered for the railway posters which promoted travel to holiday destinations around Britain
- Henry Sherwin (1842–1916), one of the two founders of the Sherwin-Williams Company in 1866
- Howard Sherwin (1911–1997), English cricketer who played for Derbyshire in 1937
- James Sherwin (born 1933), American corporate executive and International Master in chess
- Jane Sherwin, British actress, known for her appearances in science fiction television
- John C. Sherwin (1838–1904), U.S. Representative from Illinois
- John Keyse Sherwin (1751–1790), English engraver and history-painter
- Keith Sherwin (born 1937), English academic and author
- Manning Sherwin (1902–1974), American composer
- Martin J. Sherwin, Pulitzer Prize–winning American historian
- Melvin E. Sherwin (1881–1924), founding member of FarmHouse fraternity at the University of Missouri
- Mordecai Sherwin (1851–1910), professional footballer and cricketer
- Ralph Sherwin (1550–1581), English Roman Catholic martyr and saint
- Ralph Sherwin (actor) (1799–1830), English actor
- Ralph W. Sherwin, American football coach
- Robert Sherwin (born 1951), American businessman and winner of the Frances Pomeroy Naismith Award
- Seán Sherwin (1946–2025), Irish Fianna Fáil Party politician
- Susan Sherwin (born 1947), Canadian philosopher and feminist ethicists
- Thomas Sherwin (1839–1914), American Civil War general and executive
- Tim Sherwin (born 1958), former professional American football tight end
- William Sherwin (Australian settler) (1763–1822), Australian settler
- William Sherwin (cricketer) (1839–1873), English cricketer
- William Sherwin (engraver) (1645–1709), English engraver, one of the first to work with mezzotints
- William Sherwin (minister) (1607–1687), English minister

Given name:

Persian has the given name Shervin.

- Sherwin B. Nuland (1930–2014), American surgeon and author who taught at the Yale University School of Medicine
- Sherwin Badger (1901–1972), American figure skater who competed in singles and pairs
- Carolyn Sherwin Bailey (1875–1961), American children's author
- Derrick Sherwin Bailey (1910–1984), Christian theologian
- Sherwin Bitsui (born 1975), Native American writer
- Sherwin Campbell (born 1970), West Indian cricketer who played 52 Tests and 90 One Day Internationals for the West Indies
- Sherwin Carlquist (born 1930), American botanist and photographer
- Sherwin Cody (1868–1959), American writer and entrepreneur who developed a long-running home-study course in speaking and writing
- John Sherwin Crosby (1842–1914), single tax proponent
- Sherwin Ganga (born 1982), cricketer who plays for Trinidad and Tobago
- Sherwin Gatchalian (born 1974), Filipino-Chinese businessman from Valenzuela City, Philippines
- Sherwin Glass (1927–2005), founded Farmer's Furniture Company, the largest furniture store in the US
- Ira Sherwin Haseltine (1821–1899), Greenback Representative representing Missouri's 6th congressional district
- Sherwin Peters (born 1990), Sint Maarten cricketer
- Sherwin Rosen (1938–2001), American labor economist
- Sherwin Stowers (born 1986), New Zealand rugby player
- Sherwin Vries (born 1980), sprinter who represents South Africa after switching from Namibia in 2003
- Sherwin Wine (1928–2007), rabbi and a founding figure in Humanistic Judaism

== See also ==
- Sherwin, Kansas
- Frank Sherwin Bridge, road bridge spanning the River Liffey in Dublin, Ireland
- Sherwin Miller Museum of Jewish Art in Tulsa, Oklahoma, was founded in 1966
- Sherwin Range, mountain range that is a part of the Sierra Nevada, in California, USA
- Sherwin Summit (el. 6,426 feet, 1,959 m), a mountain pass on U.S. Highway 395
- Sherwin-Williams, American Fortune 500 company in the general building materials industry
