= William Sherwin =

William Sherwin may refer to:

- William Sherwin (minister) (1607?–1687?), English minister
- William Sherwin (engraver) (1645?–1709?), English engraver
- William Sherwin (Australian settler) (1763–1822)
- William Sherwin (cricketer) (1839–1873), English cricketer
