= Open letter to Gorbachev =

1990 open letter by Western economists

On November 7, 1990, an open letter to then President of the Soviet Union Mikhail Gorbachev was published and signed by a rank of thirty Western sources, most of whom were academics. The full title of the document was Socialise the Rent: An Open Letter to Mikhail Gorbachev. The contents of the letter made the argument to the Soviet head of state that while moving the Economy of the Soviet Union away from a centrally planned system towards a free market mixed economy was a step forward, they warned the leader against following through with what the West had done following the end of feudalism; privatising the land itself, instead opting towards a Georgist system of common ownership and the collection of public revenue through land value taxation. Nobel prize-winners Franco Modigliani, James Tobin, Robert Solow and William Vickrey were among the letter's signees.

== Contents ==
While the signatories of the open letter praised the Soviet leader for moving his country towards a market economy, they warned that there was:

...a danger that you will adopt features of our economies that keep us from being as prosperous as we might be. In particular, there is a danger that you may follow us in allowing most of the rent of land to be collected privately.

The letter then further elaborated that Gorbachev had the opportunity to place much of the USSR's tax burden on the rent of land and forgo in introducing or increasing the rate of taxation on the other two factors of production: labour and capital, in lieu of Henry George's proposal, the single tax, from over one-hundred years earlier. The open letter then went on to explain the benefits of land-value taxation:

First, it guarantees that no one dispossesses fellow citizens by obtaining a disproportionate share of what nature provides for humanity.

Second, it provides revenue with which governments can pay for socially valuable activities without discouraging capital formation or work effort, or interfering in other ways with the efficient allocation of resources.

Third, the resulting revenue permits utility and other services that have marked economies of scale or density to be priced at levels conducive to their efficient use.

The letter then explained and elaborated on how land-value arises from three sources; its productivity and fixed supply, the growth of the population occupied nearby the land, and lastly the provision of public services and goods.

The work then went on to argue against attempting to collect the net present value of land rents by auctioning off land to private owners, giving six arguments against.

The letter ended with a list of the thirty signatories followed by an appendix on technical issues in regard to land-value taxation.

== Signatories ==
A total of thirty signatories signed the open letter to Gorbachev. They were:

- Nicolaus Tideman, Professor of Economics, Virginia Polytechnic Institute and State University.
- William Vickrey, President for 1992, American Economic Association.
- Mason Gaffney, Professor of Economics, University of California, Riverside.
- Lowell Harris, professor emeritus of Economics, Columbia University.
- Jacques Thisse, Professor of Economics, Center for Operations Research and Econometrics, Universite Catholique de Louvain, Belgium.
- Charles Goetz, Joseph M. Hartfield Professor of Law, University of Virginia School of Law.
- Gene Wunderlich, Senior Agricultural Economist, Economic Research Service, United States Department of Agriculture.
- Daniel R Fusfeld, professor emeritus of Economics, University of Michigan.
- Carl Kaysen, Professor of Economics, Massachusetts Institute of Technology.
- Elizabeth Clayton, Professor of Economics, University of Missouri–St. Louis.
- Robert Dorfman, professor emeritus of Political Economy, Harvard University.
- Tibor Scitovsky, emeritus Eberle Professor of Economics, Stanford University.
- Richard Goode, Washington, D.C.
- Susan Rose-Ackerman, Eli Professor of Law and Political Economy, Yale Law School.
- James Tobin, Sterling Professor Emeritus of Economics, Yale University.
- Richard Musgrave, professor emeritus of Political Economy, Harvard University.
- Franco Modigliani, professor emeritus of Economics, Massachusetts Institute of Technology.
- Warren J Samuels, Professor of Economics, Michigan State University.
- Guy Orcutt, professor emeritus of Economics, Yale University.
- Eugene Smolensky, Dean of the School of Public Policy, University of California, Berkeley.
- Ted Gwartney, Real Estate Appraiser and Assessor, Anaheim, California.
- Oliver Oldman, Learned Hand Professor of Law, Harvard University.
- Zvi Griliches, Professor of Economics, Harvard University.
- William Baumol, Professor of Economics, Princeton University.
- Gustav Ranis, Frank Altschul Professor of International Economics, Yale University.
- John Helliwell, Professor of Economics, University of British Columbia.
- Giulio Pontecorvo, Professor of Economics and Banking, Columbia Business School, Columbia University.
- Robert Solow, Institute Professor of Economics, Massachusetts Institute of Technology.
- Alfred Kahn, Ithaca, New York.
- Harvey Levin, Augustus B Weller Professor of Economics, Hofstra University.

== Impact ==
Today, the former Soviet Republics of Estonia, Russia and Ukraine each impose a degree of land-value taxation. British economist and fellow Georgist Fred Harrison worked closely with Russia's State Duma in regards to tax reform during the 1990s.

According to Nicolaus Tideman, who organised the gathering of signatures for the letter, claimed in an email to a person that someone with access to Gorbachev's private papers had seen the letter with a notation spelling "This looks interesting. Perhaps we should follow up."

== Similar work ==
A similar argument in favour of the USSR moving towards a system of land-value taxation was made in an opinion piece in the New York Times authored by Achilles Fexas, titled Gorbachev Can Test Henry George's Theory.

== See also ==
- Taxation in Russia
- Taxation in Ukraine
- Taxation in Estonia
- Land-value tax
- Single Tax
- Georgism
