= Perambulation =

Perambulation noun; is the act of walking around, surveying land, or touring. In English law, its historical meaning is to establish the bounds of a municipality by walking around it.

Perambulation may refer to:

- Beating the bounds, annual custom in England and Wales of walking the boundary of one's parish
  - Perambulation in Massachusetts and New Hampshire, a similar practice, conducted once every seven years
  - The perambulation of the boundary between New Hampshire and Vermont is a meeting between the attorneys general of those two states, held once every seven years at the boundary
- Perambulation of the Town Leat, medieval custom in Tiverton, Devon of following the town's water supply along the leat (watercourse) on foot to its source at Norwood Common
- Bristol perambulation, a civic 'beating the bounds' process around the city of Bristol

== See also ==
- Perambulator (disambiguation)
- Royal forest § Great Perambulation and after
