= Taxation in Latvia =

Aspect of the Latvian economy

In Latvia, taxes are levied by both national and local governments. Tax revenue stood at 28.1% of the GDP in 2013. In 2023, a decade later, that number fell to 21.77%, as the economy of Latvia grew, the 2013 Latvian economic crisis came to an end, and trading expanded with other Baltic nations. The most important revenue sources include income tax, social security, corporate tax and value added tax, which are all applied on the national level. Income taxes are levied at a flat rate of 23% on all income. A long range of tax allowances is given including a standard allowance of €900 per year and €1980 per year for every dependent.

Social security contributions are levied on all employment income and are mandatory for most workers. The employee pays 10.5-11% of the wage, while the employer contributes 22.59-24.09%. There was no maximum ceiling for social security in year 2013 because of the economic crisis in Latvia, but the ceiling was reinstated in 2014 at €46,600 of yearly income. The standard rate for VAT is 21%; for medications and heating expenses, a reduced rate of 12% applies. Some goods and services are also exempt from VAT, this include education, medical care, financial transactions and rent.

Excise taxes apply on different luxury goods and things harmful to the environment. Wine is subject to excise duty of €64.03 per 100 litres. Coffee is subject to excise at €142.29 per 100 kg.

Taxation in Latvia has gone through major reforms since leaving the Soviet Union in 1991 and making a transition from a centrally run economy to a market economy. The fiscal system in Latvia in the early 1990s was similar to other former communist states with high public spending (45-50% GDP) and a tax system that relied on tax base definitions characteristic of central planning. Since then a long range of reforms has been made, including introducing VAT in 1992 and social security contributions.

== See also ==
- Economy of Latvia
- Micro enterprise tax in Latvia
- Taxation in Estonia
- Taxation in Lithuania
- Taxation in Poland
