= Forlorn Hope Estate =

Estate in Bristol with a pesthouse

Coordinates: 51°27′52″N 2°34′48″W

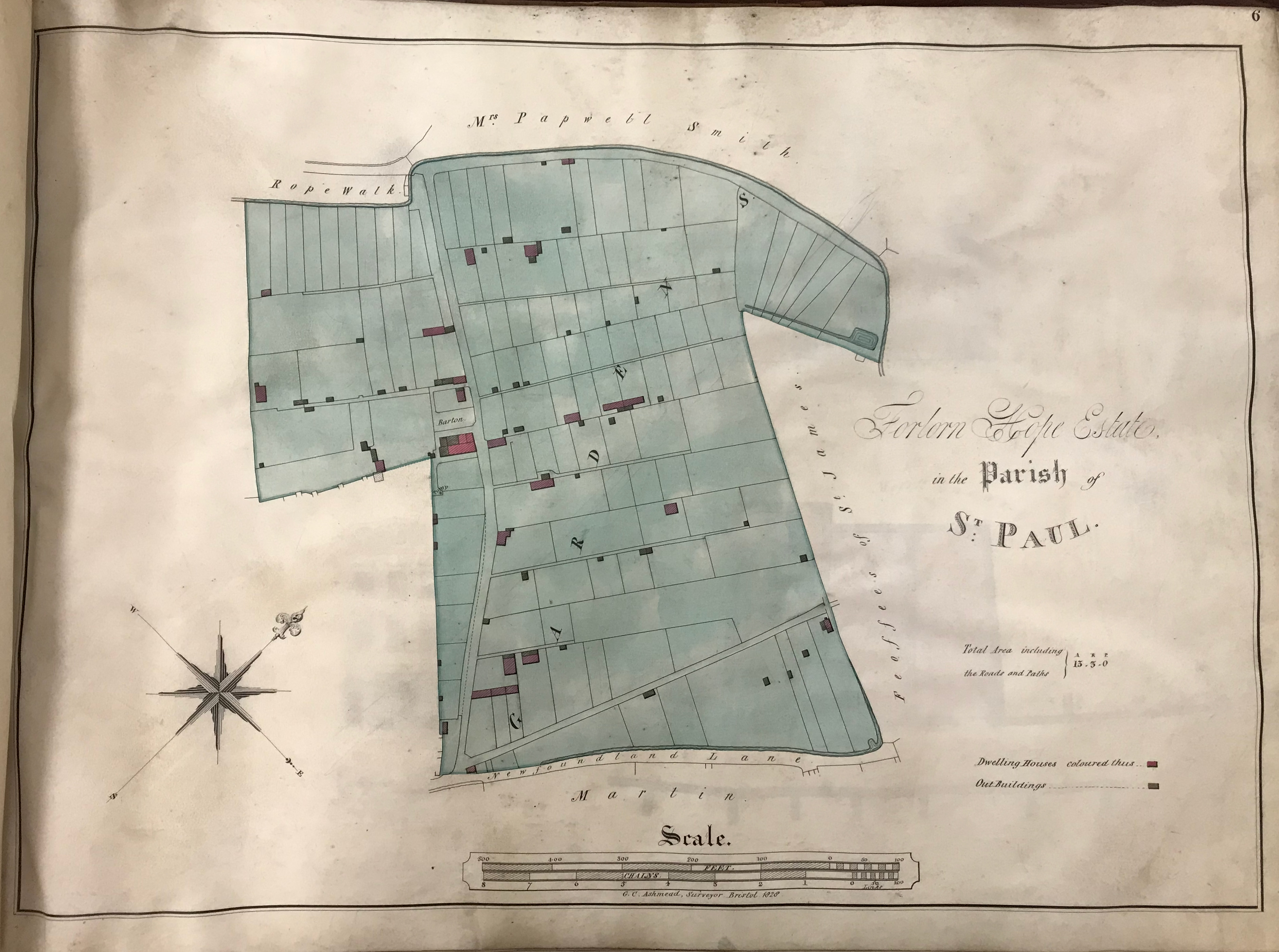
Plan of the Forlorn Hope Estate (1828)

The Forlorn Hope Estate is an area of Bristol in St Paul's. The 13-acre estate was originally a farm owned by St Nicholas Church vestry from 1693. At that time it consisted of a main dwelling house, stables, associated buildings and gardens of c. 2.5 acres, plus pasture fields of c. 10.5 acres. By 1828 the estate had been divided into a number of smaller properties and gardens. During the 1870s the estate was then thoroughly redeveloped, with a new road layout, as part of the urban development of Bristol. The 'Forlorn Hope Estate' was a separate charity until 2004, the assets now being part of St Nicholas with St Leonard Educational Charity. As such, it still exists as a legal entity, with the proceeds of the estate being employed for religious education in schools and youth organisations within the Bristol.

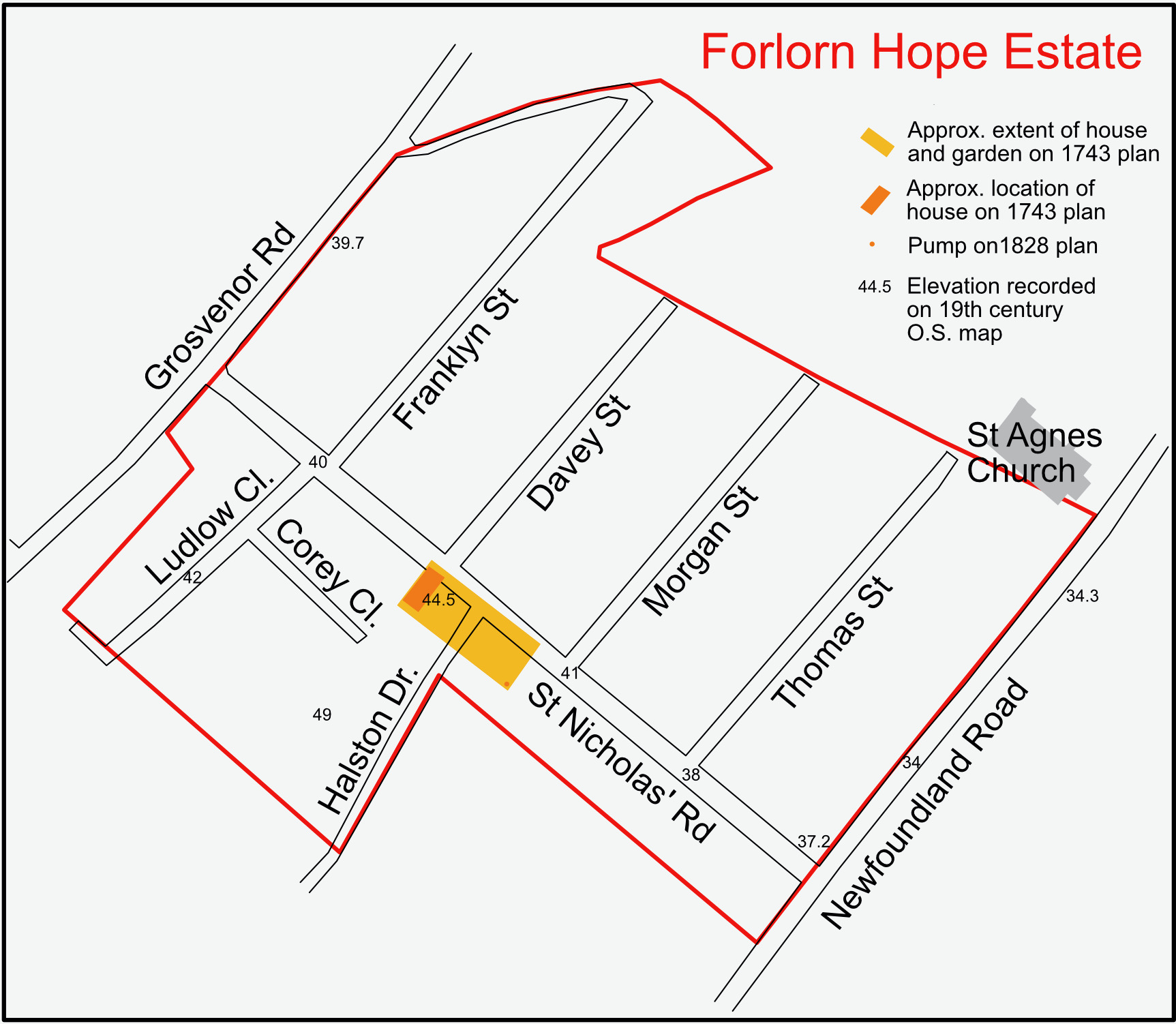
Forlorn Hope Estate with modern (2023) street plan.

== Pest house ==
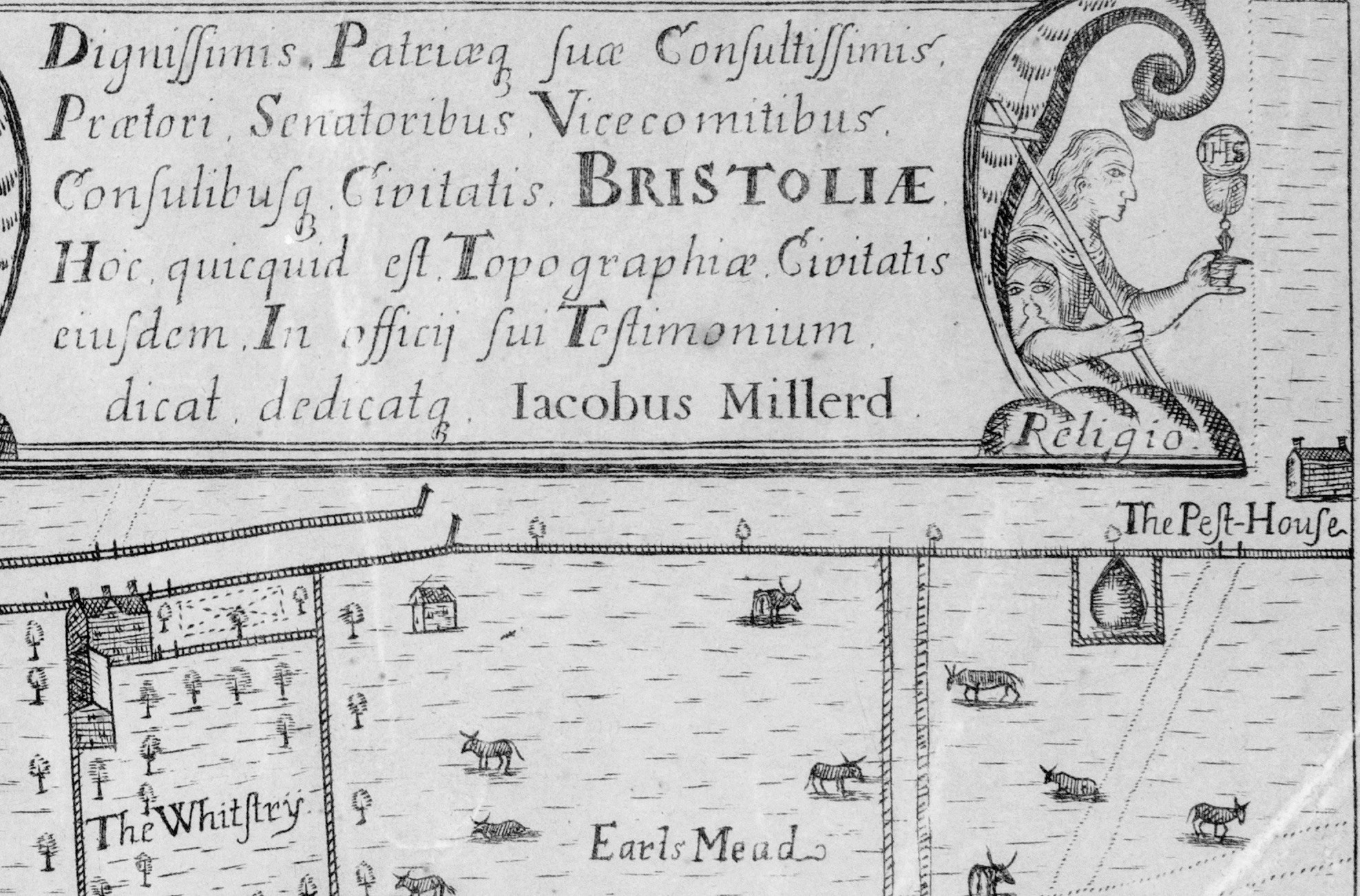
The Pest House on Millerd's 1673 Plan of Bristol

In December 1665 the main property on the estate, the ‘house called the Forlorne Hope’, was leased by the Corporation along with its lands, to serve as Bristol's pest house following the outbreak of the Great Plague of London. It seems to have been a proper quarantine hospital by the standards of its time, supervised by the surgeon Dr John Dunbar, who was later granted Freedom of the City, along with a financial reward ‘for his late faithfull service at the Pesthouse in the time of Infection to the greate hazard of his life’. Food, medicine and accommodation, including temporary huts with sailcloth roofs, were provided. Additional medical support was probably offered by the noted physician, William Sermon, who later provided an account of his medical practice and treatment of people in Bristol during the Plague outbreak of 1665–6.

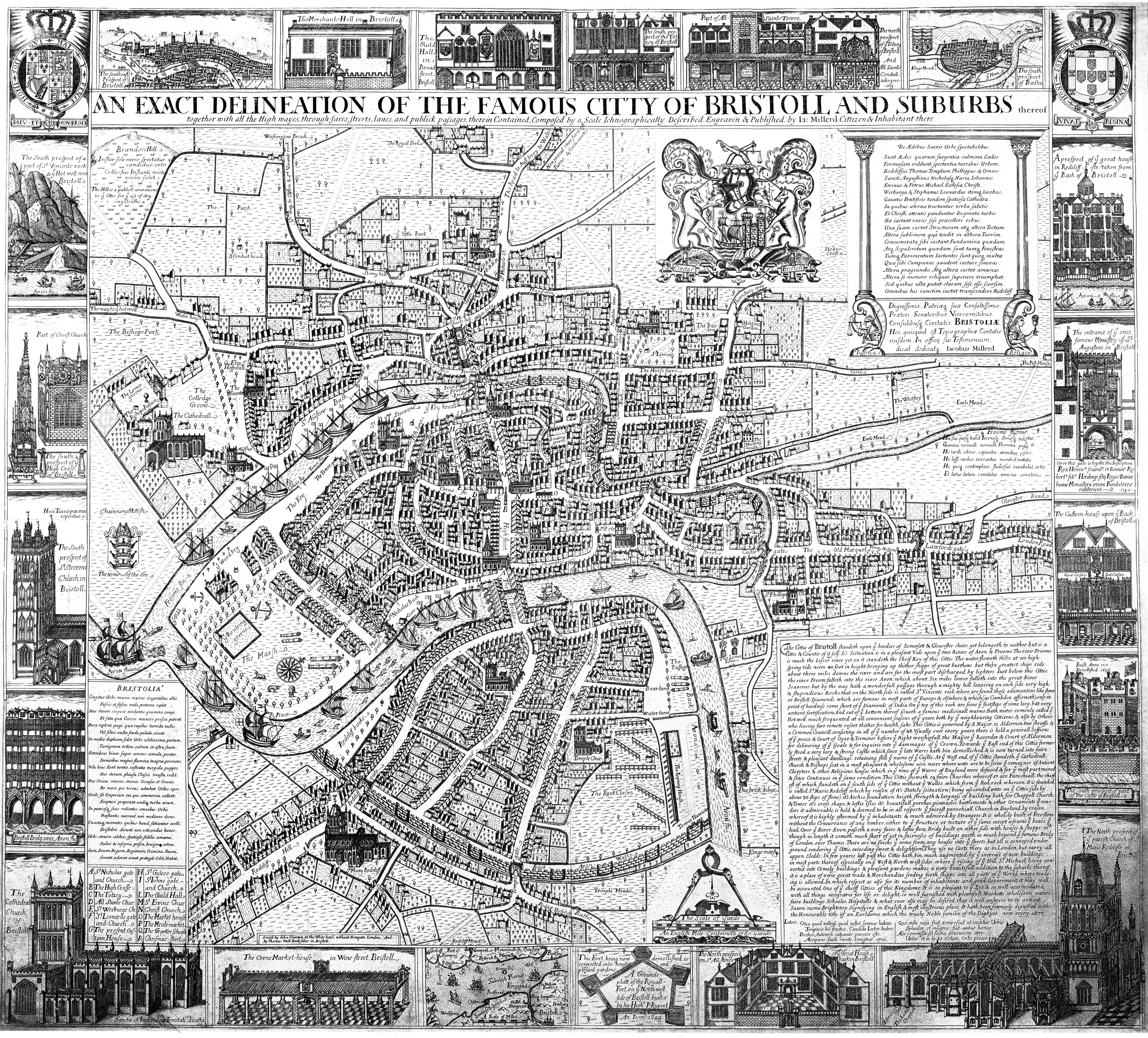
James Millerd's 1673 map

The establishment of the Forlorn Hope Pest House was key to Bristol's attempts to limit the spread of Plague within Bristol in 1666. Unlike London, where 100,000 people died, only about 100 people (c. 0.5% of the population) died in Bristol. Dr Evan Jones, a historian at the University of Bristol suggests that for that the city could thank the Forlorn Hope.

The Pesthouse remained in operation until at least 22 September 1666, when the mayor and aldermen decided to curtail their annual perambulation of the boundaries of the city and county, to view the 'shirestones' because this would require them to pass through the estate twice, going within fifty metres of the Pesthouse. The property was probably retained by the Corporation after this time, ‘The Pest-House’ being depicted in James Millerd's 1673 map An exact delineation of the famous city of Bristoll.

== Origin of the name ==
The Forlorn Hope Estate, or part of it, was described as 'Langsdown's Land' in the 1373 Charter establishing Bristol as a county. It was sometimes also known as Riglings, Ridglings, or Ragland's. While the origin of the name 'Forlorn Hope' is obscure, it predates its use as a pesthouse, in that the main property was described as 'the house called the Forlorne Hope' in 1665 at the time it was leased by Bristol Corporation.

The name may be a humorous reference to a military Forlorn Hope. This was a detached body of soldiers sent ahead of a main attacking force to trigger traps set by defenders. Forlorn Hope House may have got its name because it was the most isolated dwelling house in the city and county of Bristol, situated on a tongue of land extending up the west bank of the River Frome, Bristol. The house is marked, but not named, on John Rocque's 1743 plan of Bristol, which was the first to include all the county, including the location of the shirestones and the county boundary.
