= Shervin =

Male given name

Sherwin
- Gender: Female/Male

Origin
- Origin: Persian
- Meaning: "like a lion", "eternal soul"
- Region of origin: Iran

Other names
- Related names: Sherwin

Shervin (Persian: شروین), also spelled Sherveen, Shervyn or Sherwin, is a Persian given name.

The name is understood to mean "immortal and eternal soul" and "like a lion" and also one who is loved by everyone ("beloved of the people").

Shervin is thought to be the shortened form of Anushirvan. One interpretation of the name is a combination of "Anousheh", meaning eternal, An alternative translation of Shervin is "like a lion", derived from the words "shir", meaning 'lion', and "vin", meaning 'resembling'.

Shervin was also the name of several princes in the ancient Tabarestan region of Iran (today's Mazandaran and Gilan province), including a grandfather of the author of Marzbannameh (Marzban ibn-e Rostam ibn-e Shervin, 12th century).

In Savadkuh County, located at the center of Mazandaran Province in Iran, part of the Alborz mountain chain is named Shervin and is one of the local natural attractions.

== Given name ==
- Shervin Charles (born 1983), Saint Lucian cricketer
- Shervin Radjabali-Fardi (born 1991), Iranian footballer
- Shervin Haghsheno (born 1975), Iranian-German engineer, economist, and politician
- Shervin Hajipour (born 1997), Iranian singer-songwriter
- Shervin Pishevar (born 1974), Iranian-American entrepreneur
