= Nellie Fassett =

American feminist, political organizer and suffragette

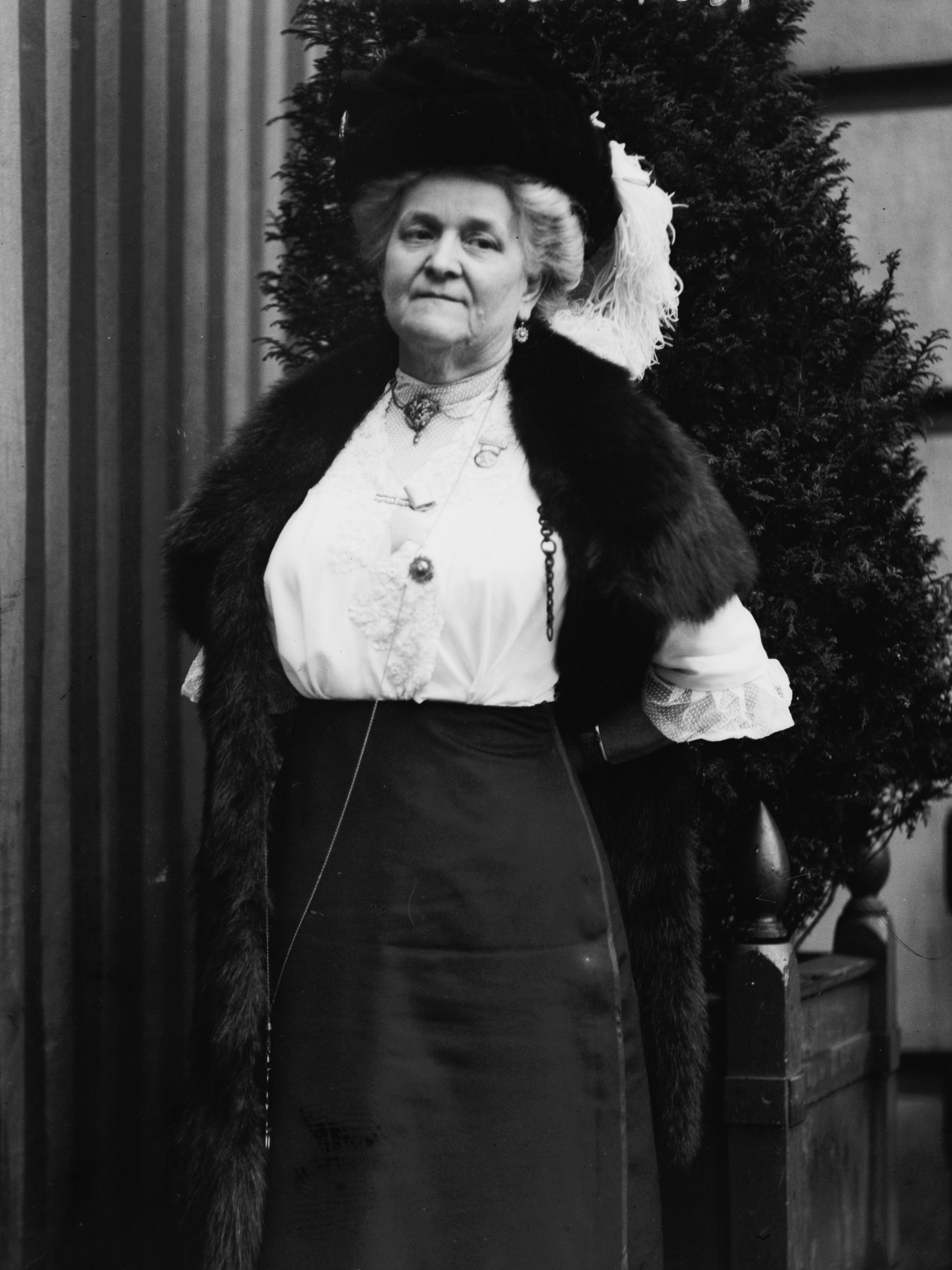
Nellie Fassett Crosby c. 1912

Nellie Fassett was an American feminist, political organizer, and suffragette during the 1890s through 1920s in New York City.

She was married to John Sherwin Crosby. Her personal friends included William Jennings Bryan.

== Politics ==
Fassett was the founder, in 1905, and first president of the Women's Democratic Club of New York City. It was the first permanent national political organization exclusively established by and for women. The pioneering American theatrical and literary agent Elisabeth Marbury was a member, and also involved in Democratic politics and Georgism.

In 1913 she gave a victory breakfast at the Waldorf-Astoria for the new First Lady Ellen Axson Wilson and her children.

In 1918 Fassett was named as the representative of New York State on the Woman's Advisory Committee of the Democratic National Committee.
