= Perambulator =

Perambulator may refer to:

- Pram (baby), a type of baby transport
- Surveyor's wheel, a device for measuring distance

== See also ==
- Perambulation (disambiguation)
