= John Sherwin Crosby =

American tax reformer (1842–1914)

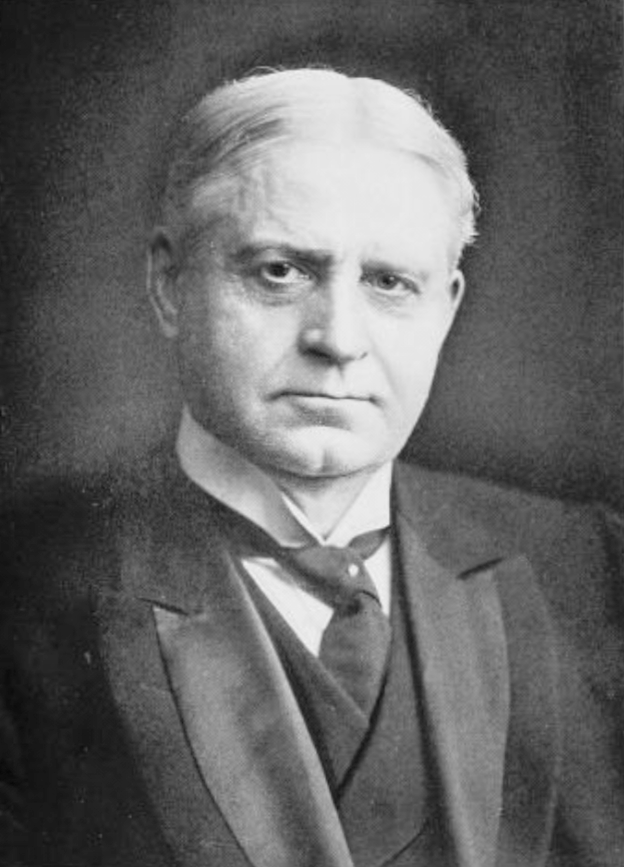
- Crosby in 1909
- Born: January 13, 1842; Freedom, Maine, US
- Died: February 24, 1914 (aged 72); New York City, US
- Occupations: Writer, lecturer
- Spouses: Abby Josephine Gardner (m. 1865; died 1881) Nellie Fassett (m. 1896)
- Children: 2

Signature
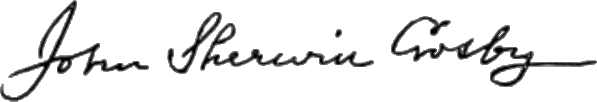

John Sherwin Crosby (January 13, 1842 – February 24, 1914) was an American tax reformer.

== Early life and work ==
He was born on 13 January 1842 in Freedom, Maine, to Sherwin Crosby and Nancy Jordan Clifford.

Crosby was a single tax advocate, proponent of the Georgism and land value tax ideas of Henry George and Edward McGlynn, and active member of the Manhattan Single Tax Club. He wrote The Orthocratic State: The Unchanging Principles of Civics and Government which was published in 1915 by Sturgis & Walton Company.

== Personal life ==
He married Abby Josephine Gardner on June 30, 1865, and they had two children: John Sherwin Crosby and Louise Leonard Crosby. Abby died on November 24, 1881.

Crosby remarried to Nellie Fassett in St. Louis on July 22, 1896. She was the founder and president of the Women's Democratic Club of New York City. It was the first permanent national political organization exclusively established by and for women.

In 1918, she was named as the representative of New York State on the Woman's Advisory Committee of the Democratic National Committee.

== Death ==
John Sherwin Crosby died at his home in New York City on February 24, 1914.

== Publications ==
- Government: An Inquiry Into the Nature and Functions of the State (1896)
- The Orthocratic State: The Unchanging Principles of Civics and Government (1915)
