= Dan Sabbagh =

British journalist (born 1971)

Daniel "Dan" Sabbagh (born 1971) is a British journalist who is the defence and security editor of The Guardian (appointed in January 2018), having previously been national news editor.

Sabbagh worked as senior reporter on the magazine Computing and as a city reporter at The Daily Telegraph before joining The Times where he was telecoms correspondent and then media editor between 2004 and 2009, when he resigned.

In April 2005, along with his then editor Robert Thomson, he was served with a criminal libel summons from a French court by the Barclay Brothers over an article published in The Times in November 2004. That action was eventually dropped, and The Times published a statement in February 2007.

Sabbagh was co-founder of the media news and entertainment website Beehive City, along with two former Times colleagues Adam Sherwin and Timothy Glanfield, and was a contributor prior to joining The Guardian.

He joined The Guardian in November 2010. He was initially head of media and technology which included oversight of the Media Guardian website, then became national news editor, running the home department during the 2014 Scottish referendum, the 2016 EU referendum as well as general elections in 2015 and 2017. He returned to reporting as associate editor, covering politics and based in Westminster. He was in Westminster throughout 2018, during the final stages of the Brexit negotiations and their passage through parliament.

He was a Labour councillor for Vassall ward in the London Borough of Lambeth between August 1999 and May 2006. In 2010, he was media advisor to Oona King on her unsuccessful attempt to become the London Labour Mayoral candidate.
