= Land value tax =

Levy on the unimproved value of land

A land value tax (LVT) is a levy on the value of land without regard to buildings, personal property and other improvements upon it. Many economists favor LVT, arguing it does not cause economic inefficiency, and helps reduce economic inequality. A land value tax is a progressive tax, in that the tax burden falls on land owners, because land ownership is correlated with wealth and income. The land value tax has been referred to as "the perfect tax", and the economic efficiency of a land value tax has been accepted since the eighteenth century. Economists since Adam Smith and David Ricardo have advocated this tax because they predict it will not hurt economic activity, and can encourage development without subsidies.

A type of land value tax known as the single tax became central to Georgism, a normative school of economic thought developed in England in the 1800s. Henry George, its originator, argued a land value tax should be the only source of public revenue because the supply of land is fixed and public infrastructure improvements would be reflected in increased land values, thereby funding public services. George also argued how fully taxing this "unearned increment" was superior to taxing productive effort. Economists have formalized a related but more limited result, the Henry George Theorem, arguing how under certain optimal conditions, aggregate urban land rents can fully fund local public goods.

Jurisdictions with property taxes generally tax land value at the same rate as other real property. Some nations have adopted a separate, low-rate land value tax, such as Denmark, Estonia, Lithuania, Russia, Singapore, and Taiwan; it has also been applied to lesser extents in parts of Australia, Germany, Mexico (Mexicali), and a few jurisdictions in the United States (e.g., Pennsylvania).

== Terminology ==
It is also known as a location value tax (LVT), a point valuation tax, a site valuation tax, split rate tax, or a site-value rating.

== Economic properties ==
=== Efficiency ===
A supply and demand diagram showing the effects of land value taxation on the rental market. In this case, the consumers are the tenants, and the producers are the landlords. As the supply of land is fixed, the burden of the tax falls entirely on the landlord. There is no change in the rental price and quantity transacted, and no deadweight loss.

Most taxes distort economic decisions and discourage beneficial economic activity. For example, property taxes discourage construction, maintenance, and repair because taxes increase with improvements. LVT is not based on how land is used. Because the supply of land is essentially fixed, land rents depend on what tenants are prepared to pay, rather than on landlord expenses. Thus, if landlords passed LVT on to tenants, they might move or rent smaller spaces before absorbing the increased rent.

The land's occupants benefit from improvements surrounding a site. Such improvements shift tenants' aggregate demand curve to the right (they will pay more). Landlords benefit from price competition among tenants; the only direct effect of LVT in this case is to reduce the amount of social benefit that is privately captured as land price by titleholders.

LVT is said to be justified for economic reasons because it does not deter production, distort markets, or otherwise create deadweight loss. Land value tax can even generate negative deadweight loss (i.e., social benefits), particularly when land use improves. Economist William Vickrey believed that:

"removing almost all business taxes, including property taxes on improvements, excepting only taxes reflecting the marginal social cost of public services rendered to specific activities, and replacing them with taxes on site values, would substantially improve the economic efficiency of the jurisdiction."

LVT's efficiency has been observed in practice. Fred Foldvary stated that LVT discourages speculative land holding because the tax reflects changes in land value (up and down), encouraging landowners to develop or sell vacant/underused plots in high demand. Foldvary claimed that LVT increases investment in dilapidated inner city areas because improvements don't cause tax increases. This, in turn, reduces the incentive to build on remote sites and, in turn, reduces urban sprawl. For example, Harrisburg, Pennsylvania's LVT has operated since 1975. This policy was credited by Mayor Stephen R. Reed with reducing the number of vacant downtown structures from around 4,200 in 1982 to fewer than 500.

LVT is arguably an ecotax because it discourages the waste of prime locations, which are a finite resource. Many urban planners claim that LVT is an effective method to promote transit-oriented development.

According to a 2026 study, implicit land taxes increase density, earnings, and firm growth, "consistent with theoretical predictions that taxing land more heavily than structures encourages denser and more productive development."

=== Real estate values ===
The value of land reflects the value it can provide over time. This value can be measured by the ground rent that a piece of land receives on the market. The present value of ground-rent is the basis for land prices. A land value tax (LVT) will reduce the ground rent received by the landlord, and thus will decrease the price of land, holding all else constant. The rent charged for land may also decrease as a result of efficiency gains if speculators stop hoarding unused land.

Real estate bubbles direct savings towards rent-seeking activities rather than other investments and can contribute to recessions. Advocates claim that LVT reduces the speculative element in land pricing, thereby leaving more money for productive capital investment.

At sufficiently high levels, LVT would cause real estate prices to fall by taxing away land rents that would otherwise become 'capitalized' into the price of real estate. It also encourages landowners to sell or develop unused locations. This might cause some landowners, especially pure landowners, to resist high land value tax rates. Landowners often possess significant political influence, which may help explain the limited spread of land value taxes so far.

=== Tax incidence ===
A land value tax has progressive tax effects, in that it is paid by the owners of valuable land who tend to be the rich, and since the amount of land is fixed, the tax burden cannot be passed on as higher rents or lower wages to tenants, consumers, or workers.

Let $q$ be the consumer price, $p$ be the producer price, $t$ be the per unit tax, $S$ be the quantity supplied, and $D$ be the quantity demanded.

The equilibrium condition is:

$$S\bigl(p(t)\bigr) = D\bigl(q(t)\bigr) \;.$$

Substituting $p(t) = q(t) - t$ and differentiating the equilibrium condition using the chain rule yields

$$S'(p)\bigl(q'(t) - 1\bigr) = D'(q)q'(t)\;,$$

implying:

$$q'(t) = \frac{S'(p)}{S'(p) - D'(q)} \;.$$

Therefore, consumer prices do not respond to the tax if the quantity supply is fixed $S'(p) = 0$ and $D'(q) \neq 0$.

== Practical issues ==
=== Assessment/appraisal ===
Levying an LVT requires an assessment and a title register. In a 1796 United States Supreme Court opinion, Justice William Paterson said that leaving the valuation process up to assessors would cause bureaucratic complexities, as well as non-uniform procedures. Murray Rothbard later raised similar concerns, claiming that no government can fairly assess value, which can be determined only by a free market.

Compared to modern property tax assessments, land valuations involve fewer variables and have smoother gradients than valuations that include improvements. This is due to variations in building design and quality. Modern statistical techniques have improved the process; in the 1960s and 1970s, multivariate analysis was introduced as an assessment tool. Usually, such a valuation process begins with a measurement of the most and least valuable land within the taxation area. A few sites of intermediate value are then identified and used as "landmark" values. Other values are interpolated between the landmark values. The data is then collated in a database, "smoothed" and mapped using a geographic information system (GIS). Thus, even if the initial valuation is difficult, successive valuations become easier once the system is in use.

=== Revenue ===
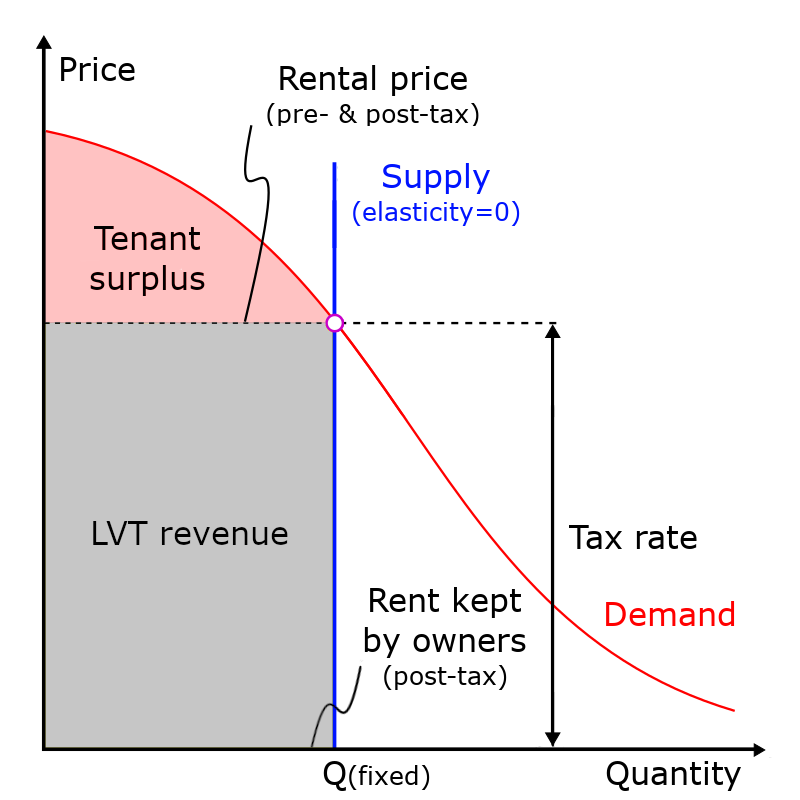
In this case, land is taxed at 100% of its value, eliminating the landowner surplus. The ownership of land becomes worthless except to those who value it higher than market rents.

In the context of LVT as a single tax (replacing all other taxes), some have argued that LVT alone cannot raise enough tax revenue. However, the presence of other taxes can reduce land values and hence the revenue that can be raised from them. The Physiocrats argued that all other taxes ultimately come at the expense of land rental values. Most modern LVT systems operate alongside other taxes, thereby reducing their impact without eliminating them. Land taxes that are higher than the rental surplus (the full land rent for that time period) would result in land abandonment.

=== Ownership disputes ===
In some countries, LVT is impractical due to uncertainty about land titles and tenure. For instance, a parcel of grazing land may be communally owned by village inhabitants and administered by village elders. The land in question would need to be held in a trust or similar body for taxation purposes. If the government cannot accurately define ownership boundaries and ascertain the proper owners, it cannot know from whom to collect the tax. Clear titles are absent in many developing countries. In African countries with imperfect land registration, boundaries may be poorly surveyed, and the owner can be unknown.

== Incentives ==
=== Speculation ===
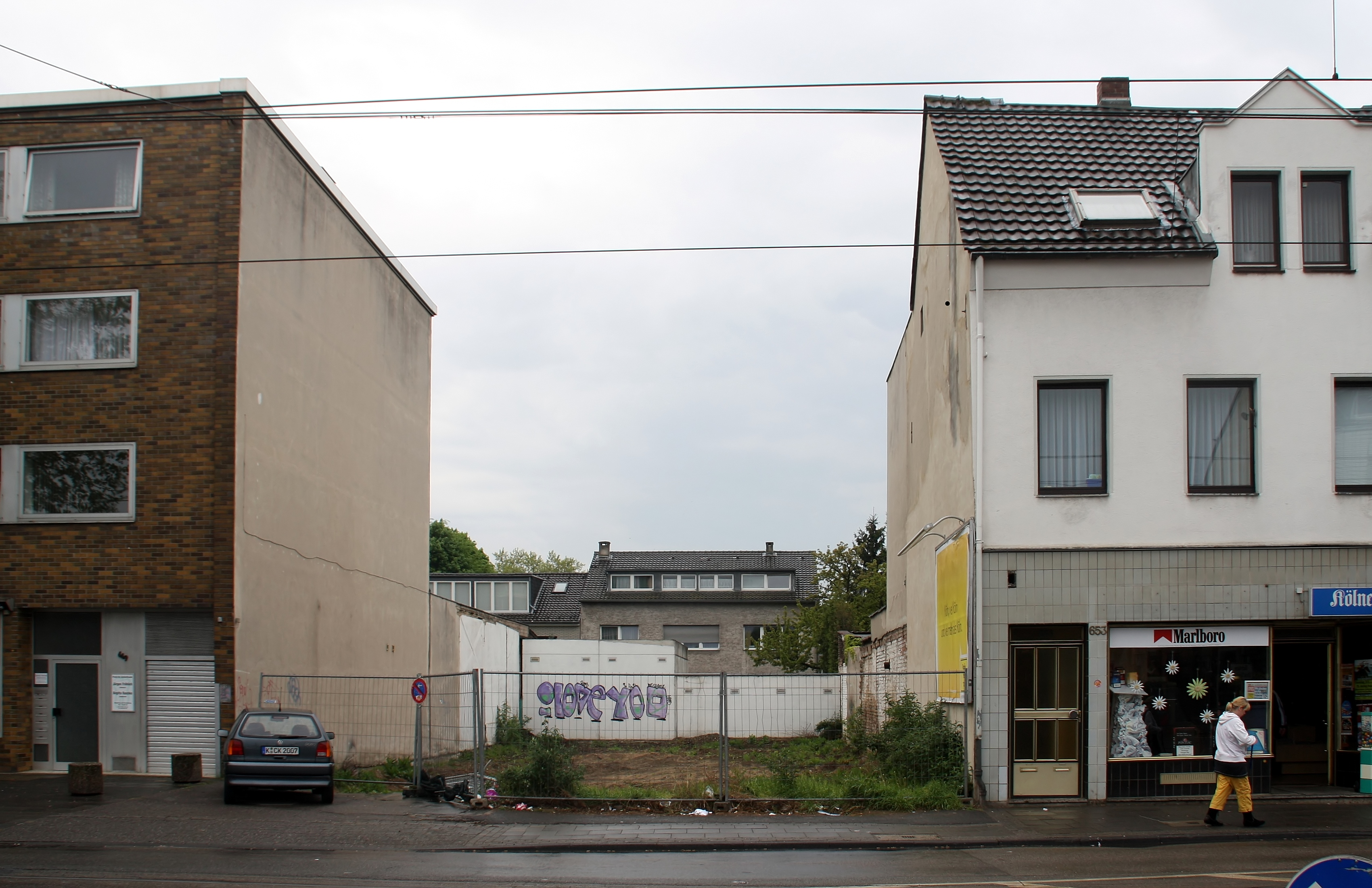
With an LVT, both this abandoned lot and the adjacent buildings would pay the same amount in taxes. This incentivizes the owner of the abandoned lot to either use the land for economic activity or sell it to someone who will.

The owner of a vacant lot in a thriving city must still pay a tax and would rationally perceive the property as a financial liability, thereby encouraging them to put the land to use to cover the tax. LVT removes financial incentives to hold unused land solely for price appreciation, making more land available for productive uses. Land value tax creates an incentive to convert these sites to more intensive private uses or into public purposes.

=== Incidence ===
The selling price of a good that is fixed in supply, such as land, does not change if it is taxed. By contrast, the price of manufactured goods can rise in response to higher taxes because the higher cost reduces the number of units suppliers are willing to sell at the original price. The price increase is how the maker passes along some part of the tax to consumers. However, if the revenue from LVT is used to reduce other taxes or to provide valuable public investment, it can cause land prices to rise as a result of higher productivity, by more than the amount that LVT removed.

Land tax incidence falls entirely on landlords, although business sectors that provide services to landlords are indirectly affected. In some economies, 80 percent of bank lending finances real estate, with a large portion of that for land. Reduced demand for land speculation might reduce the amount of circulating bank credit.

While landowners are unlikely to be able to charge higher rents to compensate for LVT, removing other taxes may increase rents, as this may affect the demand for land.

=== Land use ===
Assuming constant demand, an increase in constructed space decreases the cost of land improvements, such as houses. Shifting property taxes from improvements to land encourages development. Infill of underutilized urban space is one common practice to reduce urban sprawl.

=== Collection ===
LVT is less vulnerable to tax evasion, since land cannot be concealed or moved overseas and titles are easily identified, as they are registered with the public. Land value assessments are usually considered public information, which is available upon request. Transparency reduces tax evasion.

== Ethics ==
Land acquires a scarcity value owing to the competing needs for space. The value of land generally owes nothing to the landowner and everything to the surroundings.

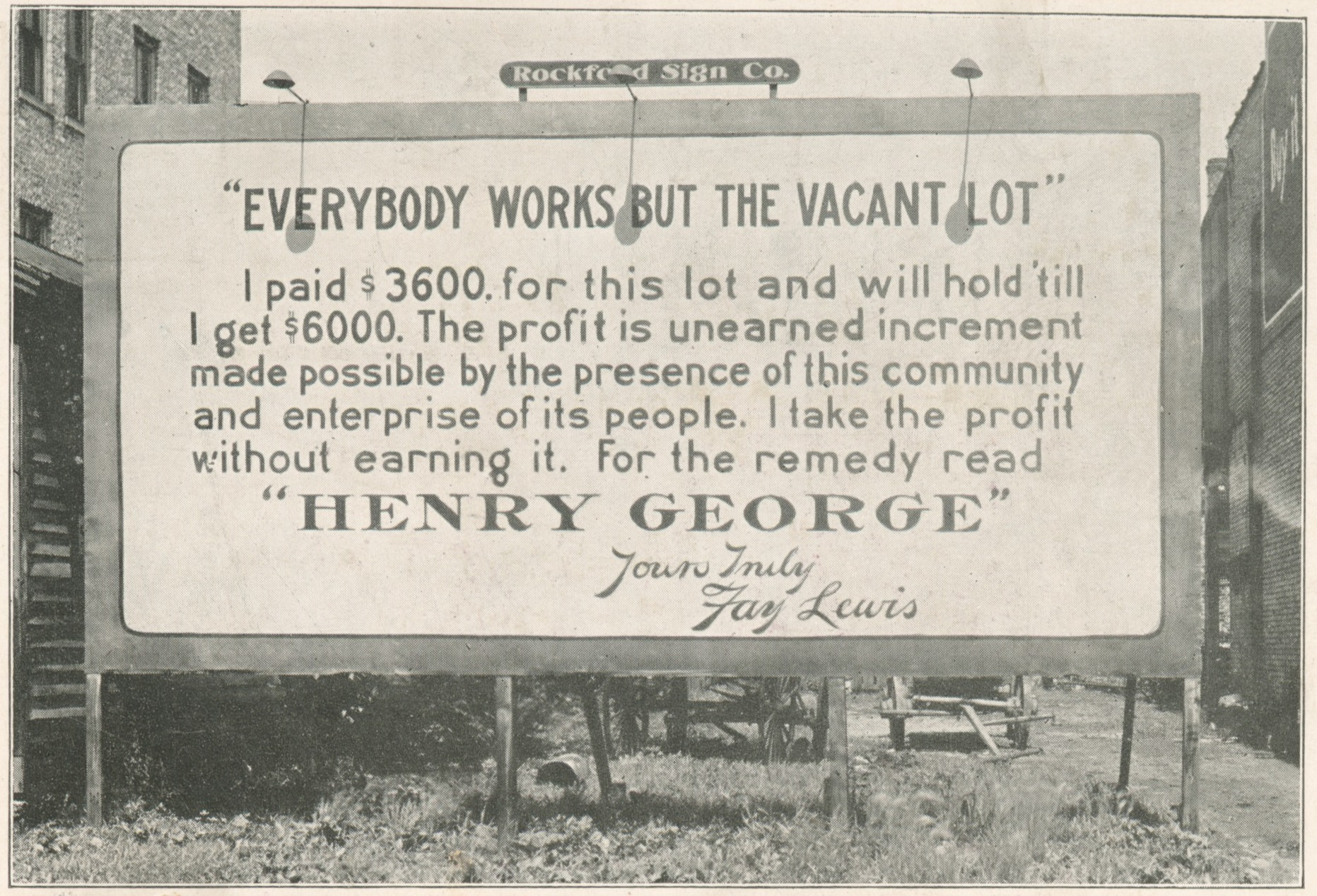
Everybody works but the vacant lot – Henry George

LVT considers the effect on land value of location, and of improvements made to neighbouring land, such as proximity to roads and public works. LVT is the purest implementation of the public finance principle known as value capture.

A public works project can increase land values, thereby increasing LVT revenues. Arguably, public improvements should be paid for by the landowners who benefit from them. Thus, LVT captures the land value of socially created wealth, allowing a reduction in tax on privately created (non-land) wealth.

LVT generally is a progressive tax, with those of greater means paying more, in that land ownership correlates to income and landlords cannot shift the tax burden onto tenants. LVT generally reduces economic inequality, removes incentives to misuse real estate, and reduces the vulnerability of economies to property booms and crashes.

== History ==
=== Pre-modern ===
The philosophies and concepts underpinning land value taxation were discussed in ancient times, including taxes on crop yield. For example, Rishis of ancient India claimed that land should be held in common and that unfarmed land should be taxed the same as productive land. "The earth ...is common to all beings enjoying the fruit of their own labour; it belongs...to all alike"; therefore, "there should be left some for everyone". Apastamba said "If any person holding land does not exert himself and hence bears no produce, he shall, if rich, be made to pay what ought to have been produced".

Mencius was a Chinese philosopher (around 300 BCE) who advocated for the elimination of taxes and tariffs, to be replaced by the public collection of urban land rent: "In the market-places, charge land-rent, but don't tax the goods."

During the Middle Ages, in the West, the first regular and permanent land tax system was based on a unit of land known as the hide. The hide was originally the amount of land sufficient to support a household. It later became subject to a land tax known as "geld".

=== Physiocrats ===
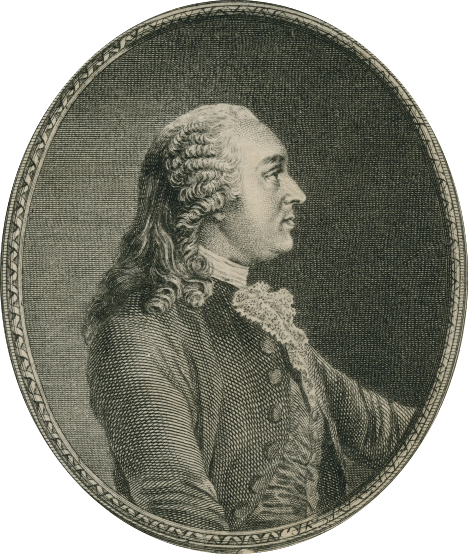
Anne Robert Jacques Turgot, a leading physiocrat

The physiocrats were a group of economists who believed that the wealth of nations was derived solely from the value of land agriculture or land development. Physiocracy is one of the "early modern" schools of economics. Physiocrats called for the abolition of all existing taxes, the complete adoption of free trade, and a single tax on land. They did not distinguish between the intrinsic value of land and ground rent. Their theories originated in France. They were most popular during the second half of the 18th century. The movement was particularly dominated by Anne Robert Jacques Turgot (1727–1781) and François Quesnay (1694–1774). It influenced contemporary statesmen, such as Charles Alexandre de Calonne. The physiocrats were highly influential in the early history of land value taxation in the United States.

=== Radical Movement ===
A participant in the Radical Movement, Thomas Paine contended in his Agrarian Justice pamphlet that all citizens should be paid 15 pounds at age 21 "as a compensation in part for the loss of his or her natural inheritance by the introduction of the system of landed property." "Men did not make the earth. It is the value of the improvements only, and not the earth itself, that is individual property. Every proprietor owes to the community a ground rent for the land which he holds." This proposal was the origin of the citizen's dividend advocated by Geolibertarianism. Thomas Spence advocated a similar proposal, except that land rent would be distributed each year equally, regardless of age.

=== Classical economists ===
Adam Smith, in his 1776 book The Wealth of Nations, first rigorously analyzed the effects of a land value tax, pointing out that it would not harm economic activity or raise contract rents.

Ground-rents are a still more proper subject of taxation than the rent of houses. A tax upon ground-rents would not raise the rents of houses. It would fall altogether upon the owner of the ground-rent, who acts always as a monopolist, and exacts the greatest rent which can be got for the use of his ground. More or less can be got for it according as the competitors happen to be richer or poorer, or can afford to gratify their fancy for a particular spot of ground at a greater or smaller expense. In every country the greatest number of rich competitors is in the capital, and it is there accordingly that the highest ground-rents are always to be found. As the wealth of those competitors would in no respect be increased by a tax upon ground-rents, they would not probably be disposed to pay more for the use of the ground. Whether the tax was to be advanced by the inhabitant, or by the owner of the ground, would be of little importance. The more the inhabitant was obliged to pay for the tax, the less he would incline to pay for the ground; so that the final payment of the tax would fall altogether upon the owner of the ground-rent.

— Adam Smith, The Wealth of Nations, Book V, Chapter 2, Article I: Taxes upon the Rent of Houses

=== Henry George ===
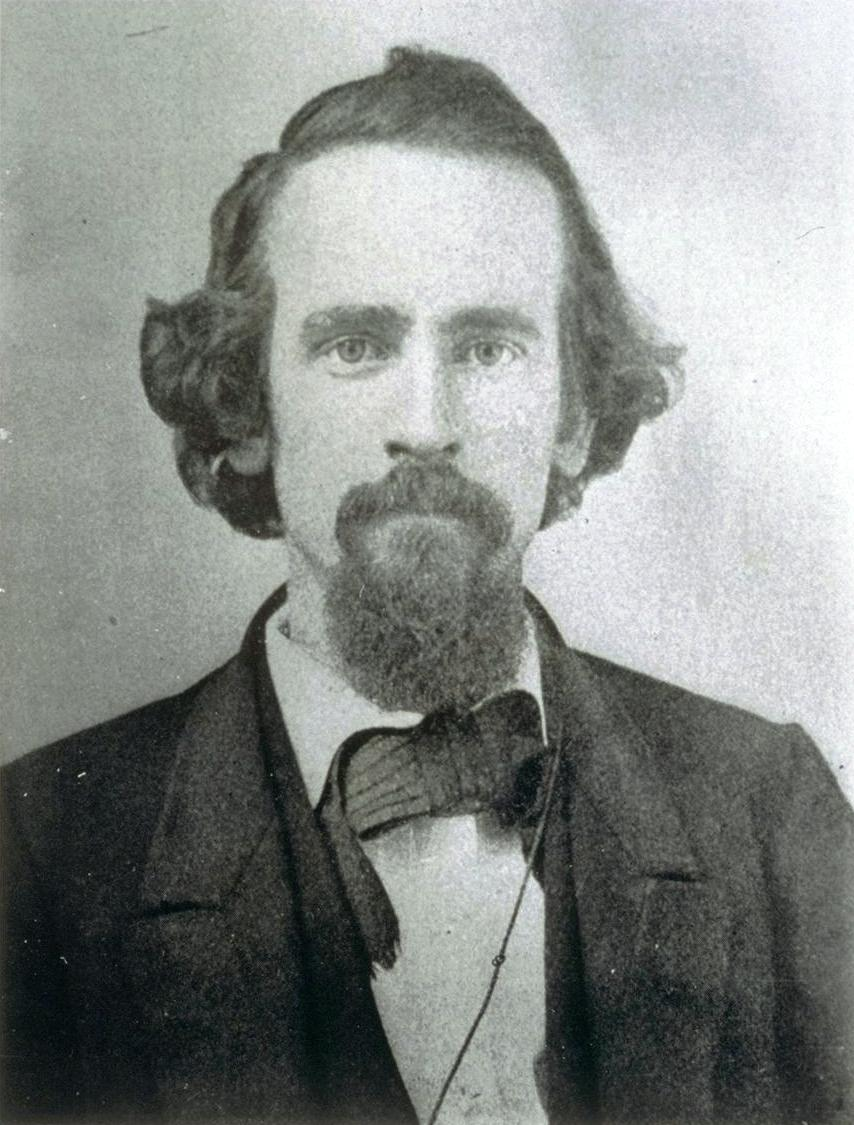
Henry George in 1865

Henry George (2 September 1839 – 29 October 1897) was perhaps the most famous advocate of recovering land rents for public purposes. A journalist, politician, and political economist, he advocated a "single tax" on land that would eliminate the need for all other taxes. George first articulated the proposal in Our Land and Land Policy (1871). Later, in his best-selling work Progress and Poverty (1879), George argued that because the value of land depends on natural qualities combined with the economic activity of communities, including public investments, the economic rent of land was the best source of tax revenue. This book significantly influenced land taxation in the United States and other countries, including Denmark, which continues grundskyld ('ground duty') as a key component of its tax system. The philosophy that natural resource rents should be captured by society is now often known as Georgism. Its relevance to public finance is underpinned by the Henry George theorem.

Henry George (1839–1897) was an American economist who developed the concept of the Single Tax on land value. In his 1879 book Progress and Poverty, George argued that private land ownership allowed individuals to gain unearned income through rising land values, contributing to inequality and poverty. He believed that as populations increased and cities expanded, landowners profited not from their own labor but from society's economic activity. George's proposed land value tax was designed to capture this unearned income and redistribute it for public benefit. His ideas influenced urban policy debates in the United States and abroad and continue to be discussed in relation to housing affordability and wealth inequality. Modern economists, including Thomas Piketty, have noted that land and real estate remain significant sources of wealth concentration. George's work is recognized for linking economic justice to land ownership and for promoting policy reforms aimed at reducing inequality.

=== Meiji Restoration ===
After the 1868 Meiji Restoration in Japan, land tax reform was undertaken. An LVT was implemented beginning in 1873. By 1880, initial problems with valuation and rural opposition had been overcome, and rapid industrialisation began.

=== Liberal and Labour Parties in the United Kingdom ===
In the United Kingdom, LVT was an important part of the Liberal Party's platform in the early twentieth century. David Lloyd George and H. H. Asquith proposed "to free the land that from this very hour is shackled with the chains of feudalism." It was also advocated by Winston Churchill early in his career. The modern Liberal Party (not to be confused with the Liberal Democrats, who are the heir to the earlier Liberal Party and who offer some support for the idea) remains committed to a local form of LVT, as do the Green Party of England and Wales and the Scottish Greens.

The 1931 Labour budget included an LVT, but before it came into force it was repealed by the Conservative-dominated national government that followed.

An attempt to introduce LVT in the administrative County of London was made by the local authority, under the leadership of Herbert Morrison, in the 1938–1939 Parliament, with the London Rating (Site Values) Bill. Although it failed, it detailed legislation to implement an LVT system using annual value assessment.

After 1945, the Labour Party adopted the policy, against substantial opposition, of collecting "development value": the increase in land price arising from planning consent. This was one of the provisions of the Town and Country Planning Act 1947, but it was repealed when the Labour government lost power in 1951.

Senior Labour figures in recent times have advocated an LVT, notably Andy Burnham in his 2010 leadership campaign, former Leader of the Opposition Jeremy Corbyn, and Shadow Chancellor John McDonnell.

=== Republic of China ===
The Republic of China was one of the first jurisdictions to implement an LVT, specified in its constitution. Sun Yat-Sen likely learned about LVT while in London, and observed its positive effects in the German-administered Kiautschou Bay concession. The Republic of China would go on to implement LVT on farms at first, later extending it to urban areas due to its success.

=== Early neoclassicists ===
Alfred Marshall argued in favour of a "fresh air rate", a tax to be charged to urban landowners and levied on that value of urban land that is caused by the concentration of population. That general rate should have to be spent on breaking out small green spots in the midst of dense industrial districts, and on the preservation of large green areas between different towns and between different suburbs which are tending to coalesce. This idea influenced Marshall's pupil Arthur Pigou's ideas on taxing negative externalities.

Pigou wrote an essay in favor of the land value tax, calling it "an exceptionally good object for taxation." His views were interpreted as support for Lloyd George's People's Budget.

=== Nobel laureates ===
Paul Samuelson supported LVT. "Our ideal society finds it essential to put a rent on land as a way of maximizing the total consumption available to the society. ...Pure land rent is in the nature of a 'surplus' which can be taxed heavily without distorting production incentives or efficiency. A land value tax can be called 'the useful tax on measured land surplus'."

Milton Friedman stated: "There's a sense in which all taxes are antagonistic to free enterprise – and yet we need taxes. ...So the question is, which are the least bad taxes? In my opinion the least bad tax is the property tax on the unimproved value of land, the Henry George argument of many, many years ago."

Paul Krugman agreed that LVT is efficient; however, he disputed whether it should be considered a single tax, as he believed it would not be sufficient on its own, excluding taxes on natural resource rents and other Georgist taxes, to fund a welfare state. "Believe it or not, urban economics models actually do suggest that Georgist taxation would be the right approach at least to finance city growth. But I would just say: I don't think you can raise nearly enough money to run a modern welfare state by taxing land [only]."

Joseph Stiglitz, articulating the Henry George theorem, wrote that, "Not only was Henry George correct that a tax on land is nondistortionary, but in an equalitarian society ... tax on land raises just enough revenue to finance the (optimally chosen) level of government expenditure."

=== Other economists ===
Michael Hudson is a proponent of taxing rent, especially land rent. ".... politically, taxing economic rent has become the bête noire of neoliberal globalism. It is what property owners and rentiers fear most of all, as land, subsoil resources, and natural monopolies far exceed industrial capital in magnitude. What appears in the statistics at first glance as 'profit' turns out upon examination to be Ricardian or 'economic' rent."

Rick Falkvinge proposed a "simplified taxless state" in which the state owns all the land it can defend against other states and leases it to people at market rates.

Fred Foldvary, an Austrian economist, has expressed support for the LVT and has integrated Georgist and Austrian models into his theory of the business cycle. "Conventional macroeconomics lacks a warranted explanation of the major business cycle, while the Austrian and geo-economic Georgist schools have incomplete theories. A geo-Austrian synthesis, in contrast, provides a potent theory consistent with historical cycles and with explanations about the root causes."

== Implementation ==
Property tax system by country No property tax Tax on buildings only Tax on land only Area-based tax Value-based tax Area and location-based tax Separate value-based tax rates on land and buildings Value-based tax with capped reevaluation Area-based tax for land and value-based tax for buildings

=== Australia ===
The states levy land taxes in Australia. The exemption thresholds vary, as do tax rates and other rules.

In New South Wales, the state land tax exempts farmland and principal residences, and there is a tax threshold. Determination of land value for tax purposes is the responsibility of the Valuer-General. In Victoria, the land tax threshold is $50,000 on the total value of all Victorian property owned by a person on 31 December of each year and taxed at a progressive rate. The principal residence, primary production land, and land used by a charity are exempt from land tax. In Tasmania the threshold is $25,000 and the audit date is 1 July. Between $25,000 and $350,000 the tax rate is 0.55% and over $350,000 it is 1.5%. In Queensland, the threshold for individuals is $600,000 and $350,000 for other entities, and the audit date is 30 June. In South Australia the threshold is $332,000 and taxed at a progressive rate, the audit date is 30 June.

By revenue, property taxes represent 4.5% of total taxation in Australia. A government report in 1986 for Brisbane, Queensland advocated an LVT.

The Henry Tax Review of 2010, commissioned by the federal government, recommended that state governments replace stamp duty with LVT. The review proposed multiple marginal rates and stated that most agricultural land would fall in the lowest band at a rate of zero. The Australian Capital Territory moved to adopt this system and planned to reduce stamp duty by 5% and raise land tax by 5% for each of the next twenty years.

=== Belgium ===
Bernard Clerfayt called for an overhaul of the property tax in the Brussels region, with a higher tax on land values than on buildings.

=== Canada ===
LVTs were common in Western Canada at the turn of the twentieth century. In Vancouver LVT became the sole form of municipal taxation in 1910 under the leadership of mayor, Louis D. Taylor. Gary B. Nixon (2000) stated that the rate never exceeded 2% of land value, too low to prevent the speculation that led directly to the 1913 real estate crash. All Canadian provinces later taxed improvements. The 2022 value of land in Canada, as reported by the National Balance Sheet, is $5.824 trillion. LVTs can be somewhat controversial in Canada because of the already high cost of property that many Canadians struggle to afford.

=== Estonia ===
Estonia levies an LVT to fund municipalities. It is a state-level tax, but 100% of the revenue funds local councils. The local council sets the rate within the limits of 0.1–2.5%. It is one of the most important sources of funding for municipalities. LVT is levied on the value of the land only. Few exemptions are available, and even public institutions are subject to it. Church sites are exempt, but other land held by religious institutions is not. The tax has contributed to a high rate (~90%) of owner-occupied residences within Estonia, compared to a rate of 67.4% in the United States.

=== Germany ===
In 2020, the state parliament of Baden-Württemberg agreed on a modified version of the LVT. Starting in 2025, 1.3% of land value will be taxed annually. The modification concerns tax reductions for different land uses such as (social) housing, forestry, and cultural sites. Baden-Württemberg is the only state in Germany to replace its previous property tax with an LVT.

The decision has been met with criticism. It has been argued that the change unequally benefits wealthy real estate owners who previously had to pay property tax.

=== Hong Kong ===
Government rent in Hong Kong, formerly the crown rent, is levied in addition to rates. Properties located in the New Territories (including New Kowloon) or located in the rest of the territory and whose land grant was recorded after 27 May 1985, pay 3% of the rateable rental value. Hong Kong is unique in a way because the government owns virtually all the land and allows for long term leases which is how they make their income off property. Hong Kong levies a property tax known as "rates," which is a tax on the occupation of property or payable by the owner of unoccupied property. This is calculated as a percentage of the property's estimated rental value, assessed quarterly.

=== Hungary ===
Municipal governments in Hungary levy an LVT based on the area or the land's adjusted market value. The maximum rate is 3% of the adjusted market value.

=== Kenya ===
Kenya's LVT history dates to at least 1972, shortly after it achieved independence. Local governments must tax land value, but must seek approval from the central government for rates exceeding 4 percent. Buildings were not taxed in Kenya as of 2000. The central government is legally required to pay municipalities for the value of land it occupies. Kelly claimed that possibly as a result of this land reform, Kenya became the only stable country in its region. As of late 2014, the city of Nairobi still taxed only land values, although a tax on improvements had been proposed.

=== Mexico ===
The capital city of Baja California, Mexicali, has had an LVT since the 1990s, when it became the first locality in Mexico to implement such a tax.

=== Namibia ===
A land value taxation on rural land was introduced in Namibia, with the primary intention of improving land use.

=== Russia ===
In 1990, several economists wrote to then President Mikhail Gorbachev suggesting that Russia adopt LVT. Currently, Russia has an LVT of 0.3% on residential, agricultural, and utility lands, and a 1.5% tax on other land types.

=== Singapore ===
Singapore owns the majority of its land, which it leases for 99-year terms. In addition, Singapore taxes development uplift at around 70%. These two sources of revenue fund most of Singapore's new infrastructure.

=== South Korea ===
South Korea has an aggregate land tax levied annually on an individual's landholdings nationwide. Speculative and residential land has a progressive tax rate of 0.2–5%, commercial and building sites 0.3–2%, farm and forest lands 0.1% and luxury properties 5%.

=== Taiwan ===
As of 2010, land value taxes and land value increment taxes accounted for 8.4% of total government revenue in Taiwan.

=== Thailand ===
The Thai government introduced the Land and Building Tax Act B.E. 2562 in March 2019, which came into effect on 1 January 2020. It sets a maximum tax rate of 1.2% on commercial and vacant land, 0.3% on residential land, and 0.15% on agricultural land.

=== United States ===
In the late 19th century, George's followers founded a single-tax colony in Fairhope, Alabama. Although the colony, now a nonprofit corporation, still holds land in the area and collects a relatively small ground rent, the land is subject to state and local property taxes.

Common property taxes include land value, which usually has a separate assessment. Thus, land value taxation already exists in many jurisdictions. Some jurisdictions have attempted to rely more heavily on it. In Pennsylvania, certain cities raised the land value tax while reducing the tax on improvements/buildings/structures. For example, the city of Altoona adopted a property tax that taxed only land value in 2002, but repealed it in 2016. Many Pennsylvania cities use a split-rate tax, which taxes the value of land at a higher rate than the value of buildings.

=== Zimbabwe ===
In Zimbabwe, government coalition partners the Movement for Democratic Change adopted LVT.

=== Countries with active discussion ===
==== China ====
China's Real Rights Law contains provisions founded on LVT analysis.

==== Ireland ====
In 2010, the government of Ireland announced that it would introduce an LVT, beginning in 2013. Following a 2011 change in government, a property tax was introduced instead.

==== New Zealand ====
After decades of a modest LVT, New Zealand abolished it in 1990. Discussions continue as to whether or not to bring it back. Earlier Georgist politicians included Patrick O'Regan and Tom Paul (who was Vice-President of the New Zealand Land Values League).

==== United Kingdom ====
In September 1908, Chancellor of the Exchequer David Lloyd George instructed McKenna, the First Lord of the Admiralty, to build more Dreadnoughts. The ships were to be financed by an LVT. Lloyd George believed that relating national defence to land tax would both provoke the opposition of the House of Lords and rally the people round a simple emotive issue. The Lords, composed of wealthy landowners, rejected the Budget in November 1909, leading to a constitutional crisis.

LVT was on the UK statute books briefly in 1931, introduced by Philip Snowden's 1931 budget, strongly supported by prominent LVT campaigner Andrew MacLaren MP. MacLaren lost his seat at the next election (1931), and the act was repealed. MacLaren tried again with a private member's bill in 1937; it was rejected 141 to 118.

Labour Land Campaign advocates within the Labour Party and the broader labour movement for "a more equitable distribution of the Land Values that are created by the whole community" through LVT. Its membership includes members of the British Labour Party, trade unions, cooperatives, and individuals. The Liberal Democrats' ALTER (Action for Land Taxation and Economic Reform) aims:

to improve the understanding of and support for Land Value Taxation amongst members of the Liberal Democrats; to encourage all Liberal Democrats to promote and campaign for this policy as part of a more sustainable and just resource based economic system in which no one is enslaved by poverty; and to cooperate with other bodies, both inside and outside the Liberal Democrat Party, who share these objectives.

The Green Party "favour moving to a system of Land Value Tax, where the level of taxation depends on the rental value of the land concerned."

A course in "Economics with Justice" with a strong foundation in LVT is offered at the School of Economic Science, which was founded by Andrew MacLaren MP and has historical links with the Henry George Foundation.

==== Scotland ====
In February 1998, the Scottish Office of the British Government launched a public consultation process on land reform. A survey of the public response found that: "excluding the responses of the lairds and their agents, reckoned as likely prejudiced against the measure, 20% of all responses favoured the land tax" (12% in total, without the exclusions). The government responded by announcing "a comprehensive economic evaluation of the possible impact of moving to a land value taxation basis". However, no measure was adopted.

In 2000 the Parliament's Local Government Committee's inquiry into local government finance explicitly included LVT, but the final report omitted any mention.

In 2003, the Scottish Parliament passed a resolution: "That the Parliament notes recent studies by the Scottish Executive and is interested in building on them by considering and investigating the contribution that land value taxation could make to the cultural, economic, environmental and democratic renaissance of Scotland."

In 2004, a letter of support was sent from members of the Scottish Parliament to the organisers and delegates of the IU's 24th international conference—including members of the Scottish Greens, the Scottish Socialist Party and the Scottish National Party.

The policy was considered in the 2006 Scottish Local Government Finance Review, whose 2007 Report concluded that "although land value taxation meets a number of our criteria, we question whether the public would accept the upheaval involved in radical reform of this nature, unless they could clearly understand the nature of the change and the benefits involved.... We considered at length the many positive features of a land value tax which are consistent with our recommended local property tax [LPT], particularly its progressive nature." However, "[h]aving considered both rateable value and land value as the basis for taxation, we concur with Layfield (UK Committee of Inquiry, 1976) who recommended that any local property tax should be based on capital values."

In 2009, Glasgow City Council resolved to introduce LVT by saying "the idea could become the blueprint for Scotland's future local taxation". The Council agreed to a "long term move to a local property tax / land value tax hybrid tax". Its Local Taxation Working Group stated that simple [non-hybrid] land value taxation should itself "not be discounted as an option for local taxation reform: it potentially holds many benefits and addresses many existing concerns".

== Tax rates ==
=== EU countries ===
Country	Average rate	Lowest rate	Highest rate	Year	Name	Description
Denmark	2.612%	1.6%	3.4%	2022	grundskyldspromille / ejendomsskat	The municipality (kommune) decides the local tax rate within 1.6 and 3.4 percent
Estonia	N/A	0.1%	2.5%	2022	maamaks	The local municipality determines the tax. If the total amount to be paid annually is under 5€, no tax is applied. Land containing a residential dwelling occupied by the land's owner is exempt if the size of the land does not exceed 0.15 ha in urban areas and 2.0 ha in other areas. The local municipality can grant further exemptions to pensioners, people with disabilities, or repressed people.
Latvia	N/A	0.2%	1.5%	2022	Nekustamā īpašuma nodoklis	

== See also ==
- Citizen's dividend – Georgist proposed policy
- Classical economics – School of thought in economics
- Danegeld – Tax raised to pay tribute to Viking raiders
- Ecotax – Compulsory fee intended to discourage environmentally harmful acts
- Equity in taxation – Economic concept of fairness
- Excess profits tax – Tax on monopoly profits
- Geographic information system – System to capture, manage, and present geographic data
- Geolibertarianism – Political and economic ideology integrating libertarianism with Georgism
- Georgism – Economic philosophy centered on common ownership of land
- Inheritance tax – Tax paid after inheritance of property
- International Union for Land Value Taxation (The IU)
- Land (economics) – Use of land as capital for production
- Land monopolization and reform
- Land speculation – Engaging in risky financial transactions
- Land tenure and registration
- Law of rent – Economic principle regarding the value of rented land
- Lockean proviso – Feature of John Locke's labor theory of property
- Natural resource economics – Supply, demand and allocation of the Earth's natural resources
- Open letter to Gorbachev – 1990 open letter by Western economists
- Optimal tax – Design and implementation of tax policy maximizing social welfare
- Physiocracy – School of thought in economics
- Pigovian tax – Tax on activity generating negative externalities
- Progressive tax – Higher tax on richer sources
- Property rights (economics) – Economics concept
- Property Tax – Tax on property, particularly real estate
- Prosper Australia – Australia-based think tank
- Rent-seeking – Growing one's existing wealth without creating new wealth
- Scottish League for the Taxation of Land Values
- Single tax – Tax system based on one form of taxation
- Tax reform – Method of changing compulsory fees or levies as part of broad economic programmes
- Tax shift – Budget tweak and redistribution of income
- Vacancy tax – Tax based on property vacancy
- Value capture – Type of public financing
- Wealth tax – Tax on an entity's holdings of assets
- Windfall tax

== External sources ==
- New South Wales Land Tax Management Act 1956 (Australia)
