= Micro enterprise tax in Latvia =

Micro enterprise tax in Latvia is special tax regime.

The law, regulating the tax in Latvia, entered into force on the 1st of September 2010. It is named as the Law on Micro enterprises tax.

== Aim of the tax ==
Initially, the tax was introduced with the aim to:

- facilitate the creation of new small businesses,
- reduce bureaucracy and costs associated with starting a business, and
- facilitate the transition of business from the shadow (gray) market to the legal (white) market.

During that time (2009-2011), Latvia was struggling with the crisis, the unemployment rate was relatively high. The introduction of the tax on micro enterprises and other changes in legislation gave opportunity for enterprising people (including the unemployed) relatively simply and at low cost to start a business.

But fairly quickly, many companies began using this regime to reduce their taxes. So Latvian parliament adopted legislation amendments. According to the amendments the application of this tax is very limited. Starting from 2016, application of the tax gradually decreases and from 1 January 2019 enterprises operating in most sectors (industries), will not be able to use the tax regime.

== Eligibility ==
The following persons have rights to start a payer of the tax:

- a sole trader,
- an individual enterprise,
- agricultural or fishery enterprise,
- natural (private) person, that has registered economic activities with the State revenue service,
- a limited liability company.

To become a payer of micro enterprises tax also must meet all the following criteria:

- all shareholders (if any) must be natural persons (owner of the shares of OOO automatically becomes an employee of the company),
- turnover (income from economic activities) must not exceed 100 000 euro (EUR) per year,
- the number of employees must not exceed five employees,
- members of the board directors are employees of the company,
- natural or legal person is not a partner in a personal society,
- amount of salary of each employee does not exceed 720 euro per month,
- a person conducts business in certain (allowed) industries (enters into force on 1 January 2017).

List of sectors (industries) to which has no right to apply the regime of the micro-enterprise

If a person owns shares in several companies, then only one company has the right to become a payer of micro enterprise tax.

If a person meets the above requirements, then to become a tax payer, must submit special application to the State Revenue Service. The application can be submitted using the electronic declaration system.

== Micro enterprise tax rate ==
For turnover not exceeding 7000 euros (per tax year), the tax rate is 9% of the turnover. If the turnover is in the range of 7000.01 to 100 000 euros for the first, second and third year of operation, then the rate is also 9%.

However, starting from the fourth tax year, the rate increases to 12%. Starting from 2017, the tax rate changes. For turnover not exceeding 7000 euros (per tax year), the tax rate is 15% of the turnover. If the turnover is in the range of 7000.01 to 100 000 euros for the first, second and third year of operation, then the rate is also 15%.

Starting from the fourth tax year, the rate increases to 18%. Additionally, the company must pay an additional tax - State Social Insurance Mandatory Contributions.

== See also ==
- Taxation in Latvia
