= Charles Sherwin =

English cricketer

Personal information
- Full name: Charles Bakewell Sherwin
- Born: 9 August 1877; Derby, England
- Died: 8 June 1950 (aged 72); Derby, England
- Batting: Right-handed
- Relatives: Arthur Sherwin (brother)

Domestic team information
- Years: Team
- 1907: Derbyshire
- Only FC: 19 August 1907 Derbyshire v Warwickshire

Career statistics
Competition	First-class
Matches	1
Runs scored	7
Batting average	3.50
100s/50s	0/0
Top score	7
Catches/stumpings	0/–
- Source: CricketArchive, July 2012

Charles Bakewell Sherwin (9 August 1877 – 8 June 1950) was an English cricketer who played first-class cricket for Derbyshire in 1907.

Sherwin was born in Derby, the son of Samuel Sherwin, a chemist, and his wife Margaret. He played for Derbyshire in the 1907 season in one match against Warwickshire in August . He scored a duck in the first innings and seven in the second when he opened with Levi Wright who went on to score a century. He was a right-handed batsman and played one first-class match with a total score of 7.

Sherwin was a photographer with premises at 10 St James Street Derby.

Sherwin died in Derby at the age of 72. His brother, Arthur, two years his junior, played for Derbyshire during the 1908 season.
