= Bristol perambulation =

Civic ritual in Bristol, England

The Bristol perambulation was a civic ritual, usually performed annually, in Bristol, England, from the sixteenth to the nineteenth centuries. Also called 'beating the bounds' it usually involved a party of civic officers (headed by the mayor and sheriffs) walking or riding around the 8 miles (12.9 km) land boundary of the city and county of Bristol. On the way they inspected the 'shirestones' (boundary markers) to ensure all were visible and in good order.

== Origin ==
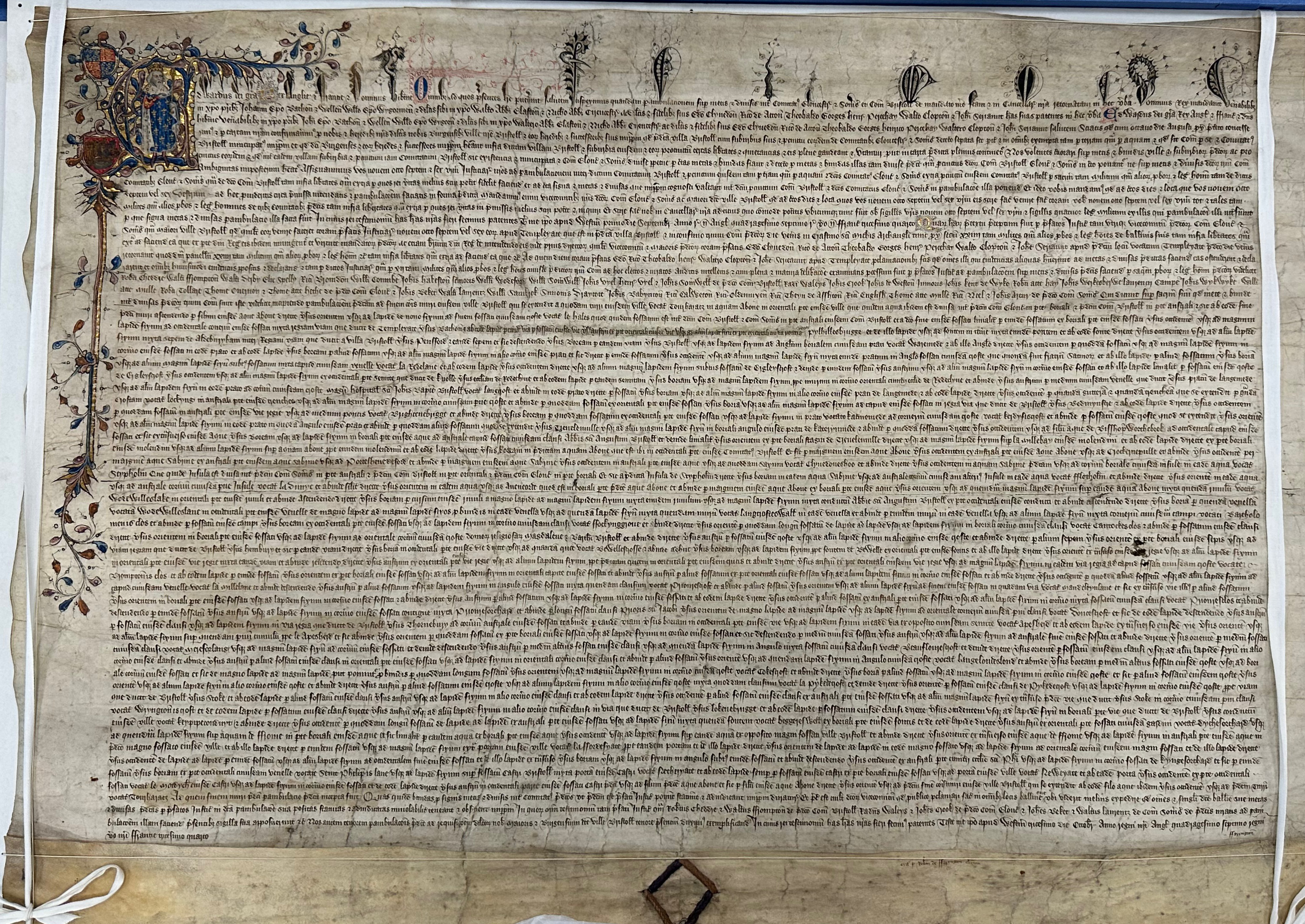
Charter defining the county boundary of Bristol, 20 December 1373: Bristol Archives, CC/1/9

The first perambulation took place on 30 September 1373, following the granting of a royal charter to Bristol on 8 August that established it as a county in it own right - with its own sheriffs and county court. The first action required following this was for the boundary of the town's existing lands to be accurately surveyed and agreed, by notable people from Bristol, Gloucestershire and Somerset. This resulted in a long textual description of the route taken, describing landmarks and places along the way, such as ditches, embankments and existing stone boundary markers. On 20 December 1373 this survey was enshrined in a royal charter under the Great Seal of England - defining the territory of the new county in law. The original charter survives in Bristol Archives.

The route and the shirestones must have been subject to regular checks by the mayor or his officers over the following centuries to ensure that boundary stones had not been moved or disturbed. In an age before accurate maps or surveys, this was vital to ensure, for example, that nobody moved a boundary stone as a way of stealing land. It was also important to be clear about the exact boundary because county law officers only had jurisdiction within their county. So they would only be able to arrest or prosecute a highwayman, for example, if they were in their county.

== Early civic perambulations ==
Perambulating the county boundary as a civic ritual is only clearly documented from the late sixteenth century. The earliest identified reference is found in the Mayor's Audit Book for 1584, where expenses relating to the costs involved are recorded. These included breakfast for the mayor and sheriffs. Following the inspection of the shirestones, the party spent the afternoon drinking a gallon of Madeira wine. Similar expenses are recorded in the city records of the seventeenth century. A typical entry, which has been published in full, is that for September 1628:

Item paide for the Charges goeing about the Shirestones viz for ale & cakes at Jacobs Well ij.s.: vj.d., for labourers to open the wayes vj.s., for butter, cheese plums sugar, duckes carrienge the provisions and other thinges as per William Loydes note xvij.s.vij.d., for wyne at Robert Shewardes xxxj.s., for bread & cakes xj.s., and for sweete meates & comfittes to the widowe Patch xvj,s,.: all is iiij.li, vis. j.d.

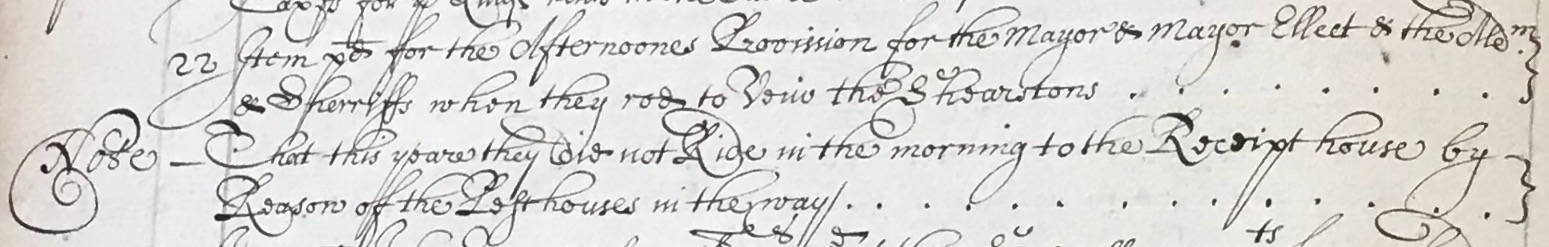
Payment references in the Mayor's Audit Books for Bristol noting the civic expenses associated with perambulating the county's shirestones, 22 September 1666

In some years the perambulation had to be abandoned or curtailed. For example, during the Great Plague outbreak of 1665-66, the mayor decided not to ride out to the 'Receipt House' (alias Conduit House) near Baptist Mills. This was because doing so would have required the party to twice pass by the pesthouse that had been established on the Forlorn Hope Estate

Other towns and cities, such as Norwich, also developed or regularised the perambulation of their town / city lands during the sixteenth century. In part this was a response to the English Reformation, which had resulted in many religious processions being abolished because they were associated with saints' days or incorporated rituals or practices that were seen as papist. The historian Matthew Woodcock argues that city and town governments saw Perambulation Day as a way 'to actively stage a reaffirmation and celebration of communal identity'. Although these perambulations were centred around the civic elite, in some instances much larger crowds joined them.

In Bristol, the perambulation typically took place between the election of the new mayor and sheriffs on 15 September and the commencement of their office at Michaelmas (29 September). The mayor and sheriffs typically served for just one year. Doing the perambulation at this time thus allowed the outgoing and incoming officers to beat the bounds together, surveying the land and the boundaries that were being passed on from one set of civic officers to the next. Writing in the late 18th century, the antiquarian William Barrett noted that in his time 'the circumference of the whole within the liberties as appears by the perambulation round it, (which to preserve its true limits and boundaries, is made annually, at choosing a new mayor) consists of seven miles two quarters and fifty-five pearch.' To 'satisfy the curious and inquisitive' Barrett then provides a seven-page description of the 'Bounds'. Earlier similar published descriptions of the bounds testify to the longstanding interest of the wider public in the exact route of the perambulation. This interest outlasted the creation of accurate maps and survey of the complete county, such as that of John Rocque in 1743, which was the first to mark the county boundary in its entirety, including the location of each shirestone.

== Victorian and Edwardian perambulations ==
From 1835 the boundary of Bristol was successively expanded through Acts of Parliament. This made the route longer and, as a result, they only took place every few years. However, when they did take place, they could be very large-scale events. For instance, the newspaper reports of a perambulation in 1874 indicate that the perambulation of the land boundary took two days and involved about five hundred people. This was followed by a perambulation of the count's water boundary. That included the lower part of the River Avon and the southern half of the Severn Estuary extending to Steep Holm and Flat Holm. In 1900 there was another perambulation of the much enlarged county boundary. On 11 September 1900 it was reported in the press that ‘the area to be covered renders the task so arduous that five days have to be set apart for the task, which will not be completed until Saturday evening.’ The party was to 'proceed from stone to stone, and see that the stones were properly marked and placed on the boundary in such a way that disputes would be averted and trouble with owners of adjoining property avoided, and also to see that the rights of the city on the line of the boundary were upheld. They would be marshalled in something like processional order’. Great pains were taken to follow the exact route, in some cases passing through private houses, going through one window by ladder and out the other, or traversing walls. A reporter noted on the first day that at one point in Horfield '‘a considerable length of wall had to be traversed. In negotiating this part of the journey Alderman Dix had the misfortune to make an abrupt and unexpected descent through the roof a fowl house’.

== Twenty-first century civic perambulations ==
Bristol's civic perambulations died out during the twentieth century. There was one in 2007, during the mayoralty of Royston Griffey, which involved a perambulation of the water boundary. A civic perambulation of the medieval land boundary, led by the Deputy Lord Mayor and Deputy Sheriff, took place on 30 September 2023. This was to commemorate the 650th anniversary of the original perambulation.

== Perambulating the medieval county boundary today ==
In July 2023 historian Evan Jones from the University of Bristol produced a free online map to allow ordinary people to perambulate the city according to its original 1373 boundary. This includes the location of the shirestones recorded in the 1736 survey and a route along public roads / rights of way that sticks as closely as possible to the original boundary. Most of the 1373 route remain public roads or paths today. However, wholesale redevelopment of parts of the city, such as Kingsdown and part of Redcliffe mean that buildings now block some of the early route, requiring diversions. The development of the city docks in the nineteenth century, with the creation of the New Cut, also forces some diversions in the Redcliffe/Bedminster area. The total length of Jones' route is 9 miles (14.5 km); all can be done on foot and most of it by bicycle. In June 2024, 'Arts Matter' at the University of Bristol published a 2 minute video, featuring Jones, to promote the route and explain its background.

=== Route ===
Since the perambulation is a circular walk, it can be started from any point and walked in either direction. The route identified by Evan Jones is based on the 1736 description of the perambulation route. This began at the River Avon at the bottom of Jacobs Wells Road and included a separate numbering of the shirestones on the Gloucestershire border and the Somerset border. The numbers allocated in 1736 were given on maps of Bristol produced by George Ashmead in 1828 and 1855. Since boundary stones were added in various places between 1373 and 1736, to make the line of the boundary clearer, not all the stones described in 1736 were extant in 1373.
