= Land value tax in the United States =

Land value taxation (i.e. property tax applied only to the unimproved value of land) has a long history in the United States dating back from Physiocrat influence on Thomas Jefferson and Benjamin Franklin. It is most famously associated with Henry George and his book Progress and Poverty (1879), which argued that because the supply of land is fixed and its location value is created by communities and public works, the economic rent of land is the most logical source of public revenue. and which had considerable impact on turn-of-the-century reform movements in America and elsewhere.

== History ==
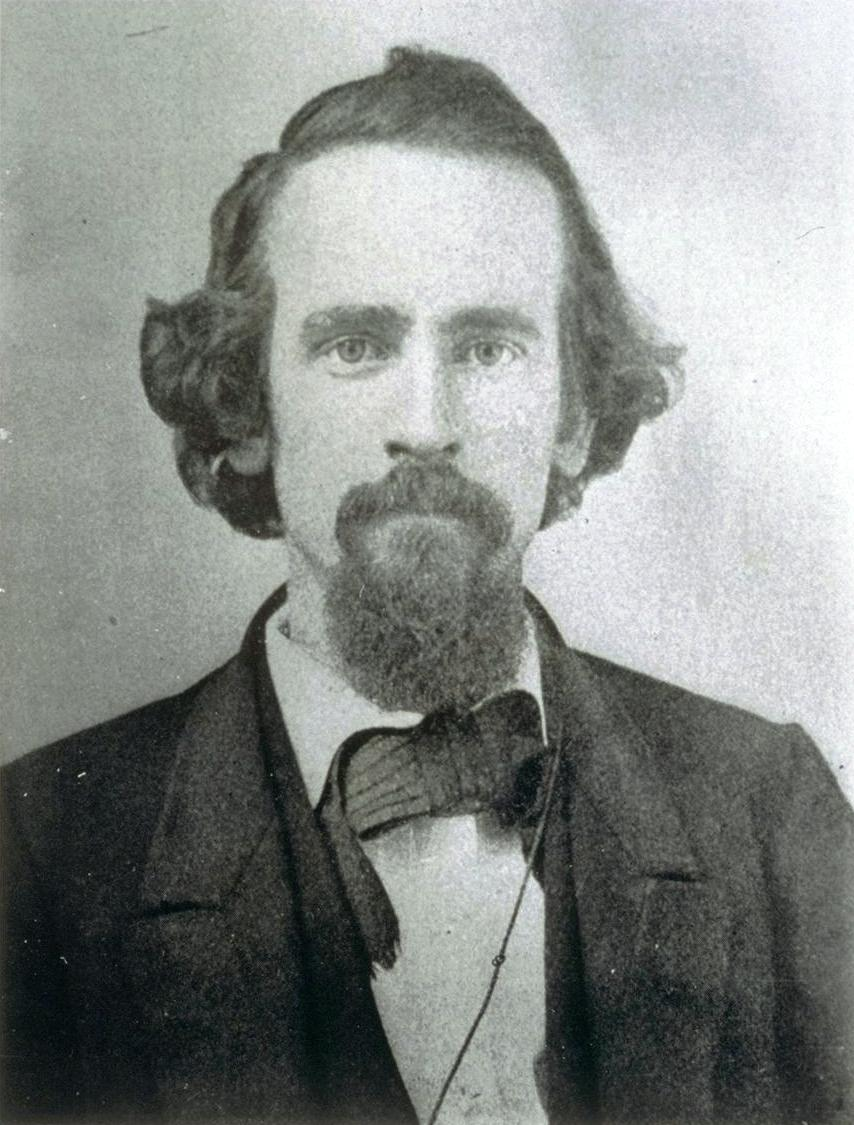
Henry George in 1865

Physiocrat influence in the United States came by Benjamin Franklin and Thomas Jefferson as Ambassadors to France. Jefferson also brought his friend Pierre du Pont to the United States to promote the idea. A statement in the 36th Federalist Paper reflects that influence, "A small land tax will answer the purpose of the States, and will be their most simple and most fit resource."

=== Henry George ===
Henry George (September 2, 1839 – October 29, 1897) was perhaps the most famous advocate of land rents. As an American political economist, he advocated for a "single tax" on land that would eliminate the need for all other taxes. In 1879 he authored Progress and Poverty, which significantly influenced land taxation in the United States.

== Legality ==
There are two potential legal obstacles unique to land value taxation in the United States: uniformity clauses and Dillon's Rule. At the federal level, land value taxation is legal so long as it is apportioned among the states.

=== Uniformity clauses ===
The United States legal system includes "uniformity clauses" found in individual state constitutions as well as the federal Constitution. Broadly speaking, these clauses require taxation to be applied evenly or uniformly within a jurisdiction. However, the exact wording and meaning of these clauses differs from constitution to constitution. Although the federal Uniformity Clause has never been an issue, the wording and interpretation of many state constitutions has created issues peculiar to each state. For example in 1898, the Maryland Court of Appeals (the highest state appellate court) ruled that the use of land value taxation in Hyattsville was unconstitutional. Shortly thereafter, an amendment to the Maryland Declaration of Rights specifically allowed for land value taxation where authorized by the state legislature. However, the uniformity clause in Pennsylvania has been broadly construed, and land value taxation has been used since 1913.

Each state will have its own legal stance or lack of any stance on LVT; some uniformity clauses explicitly allow some types of classifications of property, some have no uniformity clause, and some do not specifically discuss land qua land at all. Except for the pre-1900 Maryland case of Hyattsville (later overturned by state constitutional amendment and statutory provisions), no state courts have actually struck down an attempt to implement land value taxation on the basis of a state uniformity clause. Nor have any courts even squarely ruled that land and improvements are actually "classes" of property such that uniformity clauses are applicable. Consequently, as a general rule, as long as each type of property (land, improvements, personal) is taxed uniformly there is no constitutional obstacle.

Even in rather strict uniformity clause states, it is unclear whether the uniformity clause actually prohibits separate land value taxation. Some states have other constitutional provisions — for example in New Jersey, which gives localities maximum home rule authority, and have not adopted Dillon's Rule. While the uniformity clauses might be interpreted to prohibit state-wide action, local action may be legitimate.

=== Local authorization: Dillon's Rule v. Cooley Doctrine ===
Although uniformity clauses do not seem to be a major obstacle in most jurisdictions to land value taxation, control of local authority by the state legislature remains a real obstacle, requiring the need for local enabling authority or the abrogation of Dillon's Rule. The theory of state preeminence over local governments was expressed as Dillon's Rule in an 1868 case, where it was stated that "[m]unicipal corporations owe their origin to, and derive their powers and rights wholly from, the legislature. It breathes into them the breath of life, without which they cannot exist. As it creates, so may it destroy. If it may destroy, it may abridge and control."

As opposed to Dillon's Rule, the Cooley Doctrine expressed the theory of an inherent right to local self determination. In a concurring opinion, Michigan Supreme Court Judge Thomas Cooley in 1871 stated: "[L]ocal government is a matter of absolute right; and the state cannot take it away." In Maryland, for example, municipal corporations have the right to implement land value taxation, but the counties, including Baltimore City which is treated as a county in Maryland for certain purposes, do not. However, Dillon's Rule has been abandoned in some states, whether in whole by state constitution or state legislation or piecemeal by home rule legislation passed by the State Legislature. For example, the Virginia Legislature has granted land value tax authority to Fairfax (2002), Roanoke (2003), Poquoson (2007), and Richmond (2020).

== Usage ==
There are several cities that use LVT to varying degrees, but LVT in its purest form is not used on state or national levels. Land value taxation was tried in the South during Reconstruction as a way to promote land reform. There have also been several attempts throughout history to introduce land value taxation on a national level. In Hylton v. United States, the Supreme Court directly acknowledged that a Land Tax was constitutional, so long as it was apportioned equally among the states. Two of the associate justices explained in their summaries, stating:

[T]he Constitution declares, ... both in theory and practice, a tax on land is deemed to be a direct tax. ... I never entertained a doubt, that the principal, I will not say, the only, objects, that the framers of the Constitution contemplated as falling within the rule of apportionment, were a capitation tax and a tax on land.

— Justice William Paterson

I am inclined to think, but of this I do not give a judicial opinion, that the direct taxes contemplated by the Constitution, are only two, to wit, a capitation, or poll tax, simply, without regard to property, profession, or any other circumstance; and a tax on land.

— Justice Samuel Chase

There have also been attempts since then to introduce land value tax legislation, such as the Federal Property Tax Act of 1798, and HR 6026, a bill introduced to the United States House of Representatives on February 20, 1935 by Theodore L. Moritz of Pennsylvania. HR 6026 would have imposed a national 1% tax on the value of land in excess of $3,000.

=== Single tax ===
The first city in the United States to enact land value taxation was Hyattsville, Maryland in 1898, through the efforts of Judge Jackson H. Ralston. The Maryland Courts subsequently found it to be barred by the Maryland Constitution. Judge Ralston and his supporters commenced a campaign to amend the state Constitution which culminated in the Art. 15 of the Declaration of Rights (which remains today part of the Maryland State Constitution). In addition, he helped see that enabling legislation for towns be passed in 1916, which also remains in effect today. The towns of Fairhope, Alabama and Arden, Delaware were later founded as model Georgist communities or "single tax colonies".

In 2011, Altoona, Pennsylvania fully shifted its property tax so that it fell only on land but reverted to a tax on land and improvements in 2016. The mayor cited two major reasons for the repeal: the limited impact of the change due to county and school district property taxes, and the unfamiliarity businesses and residents had with the tax scheme.

=== Split-rate taxation ===
==== Pennsylvania ====
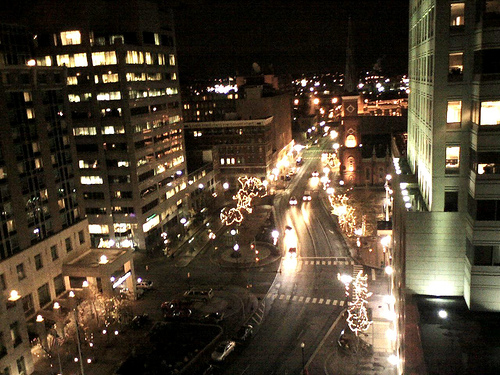
Market Square in Downtown Harrisburg, Pennsylvania.

Nearly 20 Pennsylvania cities employ a two-rate or split-rate property tax: taxing the value of land at a higher rate and the value of the buildings and improvements at a lower one. This can be seen as a compromise between pure LVT and an ordinary property tax falling on real estate (land value plus improvement value). Alternatively, two-rate taxation may be seen as a form that allows gradual transformation of the traditional real estate property tax into a pure land value tax.

Nearly two dozen local Pennsylvania jurisdictions (such as Harrisburg) use two-rate property taxation in which the tax on land value is higher and the tax on improvement value is lower. Pittsburgh used the two-rate system from 1913 to 2001 when a countywide property reassessment led to a drastic increase in assessed land values during 2001 after years of underassessment, and the system was abandoned in favor of the traditional single-rate property tax. The tax on land in Pittsburgh was about 5.77 times the tax on improvements.

Notwithstanding the change in 2001, the Pittsburgh Downtown Partnership Business Improvement District employed a pure land value taxation as a surcharge on the regular property tax from 1997 to 2016. In 2000, Florenz Plassmann and Nicolaus Tideman wrote that when comparing Pennsylvania cities using a higher tax rate on land value and a lower rate on improvements with similar sized Pennsylvania cities using the same rate on land and improvements, the higher land value taxation leads to increased construction within the jurisdiction.

Below are rates used in local Pennsylvania jurisdictions as of 2013:

Jurisdiction	Land Tax Rate (mills)	Building Tax Rate (mills)	Tax Ratio	Aggregate Property Tax Rate (mills)	Year Established
Aliquippa School District	188.000	29.500	6.3729	60.530	1993
Aliquippa City	81.000	11.400	7.1053	24.900	1988
Allentown City	50.380	10.720	4.6996	17.520	1997
Altoona City	369.015	0	∞	47.84	2002
Clairton City	33.000	3.5	9.5	7.500	1989
Clairton School District	75.000	3.100	24.1935	22.000	2006
DuBois City	82.000	2.000	44	18.370	1991
Duquesne City	18.50	11.5	1.61	10.3	1985
Ebensburg Borough	25.00	7.500	3.33	10.500	2000
Harrisburg City	30.97	5.16	6.0	9.630	1975
Lock Haven City	22.16	4.55	4.9	7.58	1991
McKeesport City	16.500	4.260	3.8732	7.000	1980
New Castle City	26.497	7.792	3.40	11.18	1982
Pittsburgh Business District	4.374	0	∞	N/A	1997
Scranton City	92.2636	20.065	4.6	28.500	1913
Titusville City	53.510	13.35	4.0082	18.333	1990
Washington City	100.630	3.500	28.7514	21.620	1985

==== Connecticut ====
Connecticut passed an enabling act in 2009.

==== Detroit ====
In 2023, Mayor Mike Duggan proposed a plan to tax land and buildings at different rates within the City of Detroit. The proposal, if passed, would raise tax rates on land by 300%, while lowering tax rates on buildings by 30%. The mayor bemoaned that under the status quo, “blight is rewarded, building is punished,” as speculators -- "absentee landlords and faceless LLCs" hiding behind shell corporations -- buy tens of thousands of Detroit properties, waiting for "paydays" when property values rise thanks to the efforts of others’ building and renovating their properties. He argues that split-rate taxation would tax "empty parcels at higher rates" forcing their owners "to develop them into something useful." Those homeowners living in the city with a stake in renovation and renewal "will be rewarded with lower bills". “The phrase we use is ‘Land should eat’”.
