= Adam Sherwin =

British journalist

- Occupation: Journalist

Adam Sherwin is a British journalist and a former media correspondent for The Times between 1999 and 2010. He covered topics and issues regarding naval architecture, entertainment, music, literature, technology and politics.

Sherwin has also ghost-written articles for such politicians as Ed Miliband and Peter Mandelson, working in the Labour Party's media office during the 2010 General Election. He co-founded media news and entertainment website Beehive City in 2010, along with former Times colleagues Dan Sabbagh and Timothy Glanfield.

Sherwin now writes for The Independent and the Belfast Telegraph.
