= William Sermon =

English physician and inventor of medicines

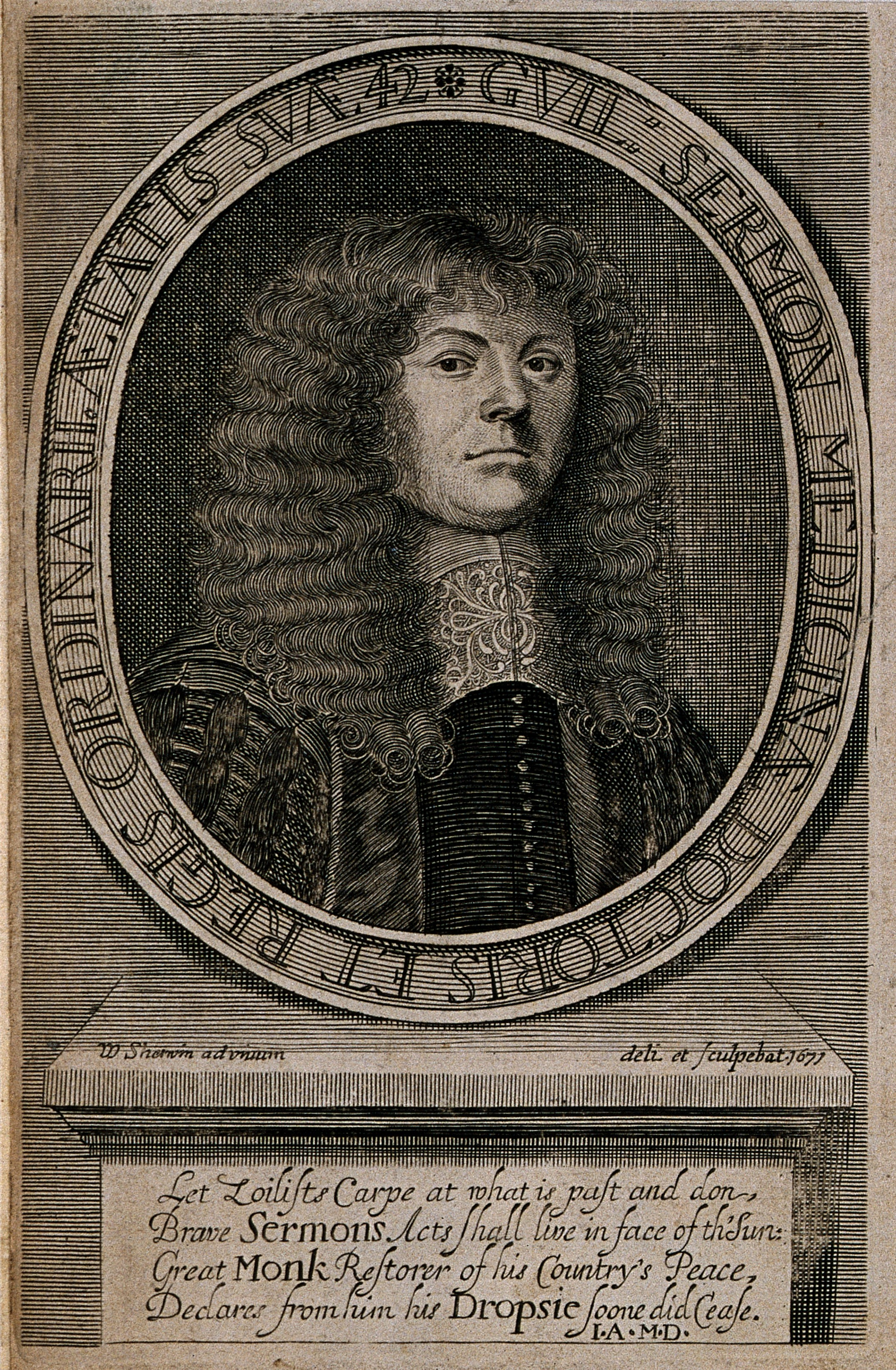
- Line engraving by W. Sherwin (1671)
- Born: c. 1629; Naunton-Beauchamp, Worcs.
- Died: Winter 1679; St. Bride's, London

William Sermon (c. 1629–1679) was an English physician and medical writer.

== Life ==
=== Career ===
William Sermon, born probably in 1629, was "nearly related" to one Edmond Sermon, a native of Naunton-Beauchamp, Worcestershire. He seems to have gained his first medical experience "in the armies". About April 1666 his "occasions" called him to Bristol, "and the physicians there leaving the city", owing to the plague, he was, by desire of the mayor, "shut up at the Mermaid Tavern upon the Back, and after that at Mr. Richard Winstone's house in the county of Gloucester, near the city aforesaid, in which infected houses", he says, "I continued the space of three months, and cured all of the Pest that took my Directions". He now obtained "a sufficient practice upon the worst of diseases", and remained at Bristol till 8 June 1669, when he was summoned to Newhall in Essex to attend George Monck, Duke of Albemarle, for dropsy. On 12 July Monck gave him a certificate of his cure, and Charles II, on 6 August, sent letters to the University of Cambridge requesting them to grant Sermon a medical degree. (Note: Calendar of State Papers, Domestic, 1669, October to December, p. 441.) In 1670 he accordingly graduated MD.

On 9 September 1669 an advertisement appeared in the London Gazette, stating that Sermon had "removed from Bristol, and may be seen at his house in West Harding Street, in Goldsmith's Rents, near Three-legged Alley, between Fetter Lane and Shoe Lane". (Note: Calendar of State Papers, Domestic, 1669, October to December, p. 486.) He afterwards gained a considerable practice, and was made Physician-in-Ordinary to the King.

=== Works ===
In 1672 appeared the eighth edition of Sermon's Advertisement concerning those most famous and safe cathartiques and diuretique Pills … wherewith was cured the late Lord-general Monck of the Dropsie. Sermon denies that Monck eventually died of the dropsy, "as many enviously report". (Note: cf. Gumble, Life of Monck, pp. 246, 254, 476.)

Much of the book is repeated in The Ladies Companion, or the English Midwife (1671, 8vo), which is illustrated with sixteen copper cuts, giving "the various forms of the childs proceeding forth of the womb". The author complains of "the great rage of black-mouth'd envy" excited by his success.

A third work, issued in 1673, was A Friend to the Sick, or the honest English Man's preservative … with a particular discourse of the Dropsie, scurvie, and yellow jaundice. Prefixed to it are some Latin hexameters by P[ayne] Fisher, and some English laudatory verses by various friends, including William Winstanley.

=== Death ===
Sermon died at his house in the parish of St Bride's, London, in the winter of 1679. A portrait of him, drawn and engraved by William Sherwin in 1671, represents him in a doctor's gown at the age of forty-two. Under it are some doggerel lines, referring to his cure of Monck. It is prefixed to both The Ladies Companion and the Friend to the Sick. Wood calls him "that forward, vain, and conceited person". (Note: Wood, Fasti Oxonienses. ed. Bliss, ii. 35.)
