= Arthur Sherwin =

English cricketer

Personal information
- Full name: Arthur West Sherwin
- Born: 22 July 1879; Derby, England
- Died: 10 October 1947 (aged 68); Duffield, Derbyshire, England
- Batting: Right-handed
- Bowling: Right-arm medium
- Relatives: Charles Sherwin (brother)

Domestic team information
- Years: Team
- 1908: Derbyshire
- FC debut: 18 May 1908 Derbyshire v Sussex
- Last FC: 27 July 1908 Derbyshire v Yorkshire

Career statistics
Competition	First-class
Matches	11
Runs scored	152
Batting average	8.00
100s/50s	0/0
Top score	24
Catches/stumpings	4/–
- Source: CricketArchive, July 2012

Arthur West Sherwin (22 July 1879 – 10 October 1947) was an English cricketer who played first-class cricket for Derbyshire during the 1908 season.

Sherwin was born in Derby, the son of Samuel Sherwin, a chemist, and his wife Margaret. He made his debut for Derbyshire in the 1908 season in May against Sussex when he scored 7. He played regularly to the end of the season. Sherwin was a right-handed batsman and played 21 innings in 11 first-class matches with an average of 8 and a top score of 24.

Sherwin died in Duffield, Derbyshire at the age of 68. His brother, Charles, two years older, played one match for Derbyshire in the 1907 season.
