= Sherwin Glass =

Sherwin Glass (1927?–2005?) founded Farmer's Furniture Company, He was elected to the Furniture Hall of Fame and engaged in huge philanthropy including providing the Sherwin Glass Swim Center at the Atlanta Jewish Community Center and endowing the Shana Glass Leadership Conference for the Anti-Defamation League. He also received major awards from the Anti-Defamation League and the Jewish Federation. He had seven brothers and sisters all of which predeceased him except Sarah L. Bush of Boca Raton, FL.

== Sources ==
- Article title
- SLAKMAN v. CONTINENTAL CASUALTY COMPANY
- The Northside Hospital Family Aquatic Center Sherwin Glass Aquatic Center
- Sherwin Glass - legacy of a great Georgia citizen
- http://www.legis.state.ga.us/legis/2005_06/fulltext/sr1029.htm
