= Shervin Charles =

Saint Lucian cricketer (born 1983)

Personal information
- Full name: Shervin Mitchel Charles
- Born: 20 September 1983 (age 43); Saint Lucia
- Batting: Right-handed
- Bowling: Right-arm medium-fast
- Role: All-rounder

Domestic team information
- Years: Team
- 2008: Saint Lucia
- Source: CricketArchive, May 11, 2016

Shervin Mitchel Charles (birth September 20, 1983 in St Lucia) is a former Saint Lucian cricketer who played for the Saint Lucia national cricket team in Stanford 20/20 in West Indian domestic cricket. He played as a right-handed batsman as well as right-arm medium-fast bowler.
