= Taxation in Estonia =

Taxation in Estonia consists of state and local taxes. A relatively high proportion of government revenue comes from consumption taxes whilst revenue from capital taxes is one of the lowest in the European Union.

== Land Value Tax ==
Estonia levies a Land Value Tax which is used to fund local municipalities. It is a state level tax, but 100% of the revenue is used to fund Local Councils. The rate is set by the Local Council within the limits of 0.1-2.5%. It is one of the most important sources of funding for municipalities.

The Land Value Tax is levied on the value of the land only, improvements are not considered. Very few exemptions are considered on the land tax and even public institutions are subject to the land value tax. Land that is the site of a church is exempt, but other land held by religious institutions is not exempt.

The tax has contributed to a high rate (~90%) of owner-occupied residences within Estonia, compared to a rate of 67.4% in the United States, though this number might be overstated.

== Natural persons income tax ==
Estonia natural person income tax is considered to be proportional, but, due to basic exemption, it is actually progressive. Standard rate for natural persons in year 2015 is 20% (down from 21% in 2014). A basic exemption is granted, which is increased upon provision of maintenance to a child, in event of pensions, in event of compensation for accident at work or occupational disease. Additionally, a number of expenses are deductible: housing loan interests, training expenses, gifts, donations, contributions to a voluntary/mandatory funded pension and unemployment insurance, social security payments mandatory in a foreign state. Amount of deductible housing loan interest, training expenses, gifts and donations is limited – in 2011, the limit was 3196 euros but no more than 50% of the taxpayer's income during the same period of taxation.

There is no capital gains tax but gains from transfer of securities or other financial assets are subject to standard income tax. Since 2011, a new system has been in place, which allows natural persons to defer the tax liability created on income received from financial assets until the time of taking the income into use, by using an investment account for this purpose. An investment account is just an ordinary monetary account with an obligation to record all money transfers. For attaining an objective by means of an investment account, income received from the financial assets must be transferred to an investment account without delay. A taxable amount shall be created when the disbursements made from all investment accounts exceed the balance of contributions in all investment accounts after the disbursement.

== Social tax and mandatory insurance payments ==
Salaries paid to employees are subject to

1. Social tax
2. Unemployment insurance premiums
3. Funded pension payment

Social tax rate stands at 33%. The same rate is applied to fringe benefits that employer provides to employees. Unemployment insurance premiums are paid by both employer and employee: 2.8% is withheld is of the employee gross salary and 1.4% is paid by employers of monthly gross salaries. In 2012, a rate of a funded pension payment is 2% of the gross salary of a resident employee and are withheld by employer.

== Corporations/legal persons income tax ==
Legal persons income tax rate is 20% in the year 2015. However, the system of corporate earnings taxation currently in force in Estonia is a unique system, which shifts the moment of corporate taxation from the moment of earning the profits to the moment of their distribution. In other words, earning profits in itself does not bring income tax liability, which arises only when earned profit is distributed to shareholders. In case profit distributed to shareholders originates from dividends received from a subsidiary company or from a permanent establishment the corporation has in another country, then profit distribution is tax exempt. Distributed profits mean gifts, donations, representation expenses and any payments and expenses not connected to the business. Estonia does not have withholding tax on dividends paid. Nevertheless, distributed profits are taxed at a rate of 20%.

== Value added tax ==
From 1 July 2009, the standard VAT tax rate in Estonia has been 20% and a reduced rate of 9%. A small number of goods and services are not taxed. Estonian VAT system is based on EU Council directive 2006/112/EC and its basic principles are the same as in other EU countries. As of 2018, the annual turnover threshold for mandatory registration as VAT liable person is 40,000 euros. Since 2024, the VAT tax was increased to 22% and from 2025, the VAT will be further increased to 24%.

== Tax administration in Estonia ==
Responsibility for administering taxes lies on the Tax and Customs Board. Majority of tax declarations are presented via Internet: for example, in the year 2012 94,2% of all natural persons income tax declaration were presented using the Internet. Percentages for VAT and customs declarations are even higher.

== Other taxes ==
Taxes applied in Estonia that were not mentioned previously:

1. Excises on electricity, alcohol, tobacco, fuel and packaging.
2. Customs duties.
3. Tax on gambling.
4. Tax on heavy vehicles.
