= William Sherwin (engraver) =

English engraver

William Sherwin (c. 1645–c. 1709) was an English engraver, one of the first to work with mezzotints.

== Life ==
He was the son of William Sherwin (1607–1687?), the nonconformist minister, and was born at Wallington, Hertfordshire, where his father was rector around 1645. On his print of his father, dated 1672, he styles himself engraver to the king by patent. He married Elizabeth Pride, great-niece and ward of George Monck, 1st Duke of Albemarle, whose heir-at-law she eventually became, and there exists a pedigree of the Moncks of Potheridge engraved by Sherwin expressly to show his wife's claim to that position.

== Works ==
Between 1670 and 1711 he engraved in the line style a number of portraits. These comprise large plates of Charles II, Catherine of Braganza, Prince Rupert, Baron Gerard of Brandon, the Duchess of Cleveland, and Slingsby Bethel. He also made small ones prefixed to books. He engraved the title to John Reynolds's ‘Triumphes of God's Revenge against Murder,’ 1670, several of the plates in Francis Sandford's History of the Coronation of James II, 1687, and the portraits of Dr. William Sermon, prefixed to his works.

Sherwin was one of the early practitioners of mezzotint, a technique he learned from Prince Rupert. He dedicated to the Prince a pair of large portraits of Charles II and his queen engraved using the method; the former of these is dated 1669, the earliest found on an English mezzotint. Among his other mezzotint plates are portraits of the Duke of Albemarle, Elizabeth Monck, Duchess of Albemarle, Adrian Beverland, and a number of royal personages. Sherwin seems to have worked mainly from his own drawings.
