= William Sherwin (Australian settler) =

- Born: 22 May 1763; Derbyshire, England
- Died: 29 March 1822 (aged 58); Parramatta NSW

William Sherwin (22 May 1763 – 29 March 1822) was an Australian settler. He arrived in Australia 1792 aboard the "Pitt" as Sergeant in the NSW Corps. He went on to become a storekeeper and a constable at Parramatta and had significant land holdings. He cohabited with Mary Duggan (born 1783), who arrived on the "Marquis Cornwallis"; they did not marry because Sherwin had a wife, Ann, in England. She gave birth to ten children. William travelled between his farm in Whittlesea, Victoria, Merriwa and Sydney. Members of his family can be found along this route.

William grew the first oranges in Australia. He founded a big family that included, among many others, the first Australian-born doctor, two members of parliament in Victoria and the first shire clerk of Baulkham Hills. His son William Sherwin Jr. (born 1804) returned to England and became the first Australian to become a member of the Royal College of Surgeons in 1826.
