= William Sherwin (minister) =

William Sherwin (1607–c.1687) was an English minister. He acted as lecturer or assistant to the Rev Josias Byrd, the Rector at the church of St Mary the Virgin at Baldock.

== Life ==
The Dictionary of National Biography suggests that he was either silenced in 1660 or ejected in 1662. He wrote a number of works on biblical and theological themes.

He died at Fowlmere, Cambridge, in the house of his son-in-law, aged about 80. Sherwin married, on 11 September 1637, Dorothea Swan, described as ‘generosa.’ His son (also called William Sherwin) became a notable engraver.

== Publications ==
His publications included;

- Prodromos the fore-runner of Christ's peaceable kingdom upon earth. (1665)
- A Scheme of the Whole Book of the Revelation of Jesus Christ, (1671)
- Exanastasis, or, The saints rising out of the heap or mass of dead bodies contained in the globe of the earth and sea ... Rev. 20. 5 (1674)
- An additional supplement to the Eirenikon (1674)
- The true news of the good new world shortly to come (Heb. 2. 5.) for all such as then shall be found real saints (1675)
