= Rastrick (disambiguation) =

Rastrick is a village in West Yorkshire, England.

It may also refer to:

- Rastrick High School
- John Urpeth Rastrick, an English steam locomotive builder
