= Land Values =

- Frequency: Monthly
- First issue: June 1902
- Final issue: June 1919
- Country: United Kingdom
- Language: English

Land Values was the monthly newspaper precursor of the contemporary magazine Land&Liberty. The periodical started life in June 1894 as The Single Tax, changing its name to Land Values in June 1902.

The first issue of Land Values announced that:

"though the name is changed to suit the requirements of the present political situation - a situation the paper has done its best to create - we leave our readers to judge whether we swerve from the principle and policy hitherto advocated, namely, that the value of the land is the reflex of the presence and industry of the whole people, and that it should be taken in taxation for public purposes".

The paper inherited its one and only editor, John Paul, from its predecessor publication, in turn passing him on to its successor. Until 1904, Paul and his associate Fred Verinder had responsibility for publication, after which responsibility passed to Paul alone. In that same year the paper's proprietor, the Scottish Single Tax League, passed its ownership over to the Scottish League for the Taxation of Land Values (both organisations Glasgow-based). The SLTLV in turn, in 1907 - signalling the publication's move to London - handed proprietorship over to the United Committee for the Taxation of Land Values.

In its seventeen years of publication, ninety-six issues of the periodical appeared (nos. 97 to 300, in twelve volumes, vols. IX to XX (part)). In 1919 (its twenty-fifth year from launch of The Single Tax) the publication changed its name to Land&Liberty (incorporating Land Values) - with the suffix dropped in January 1924 - the new title to "bring it more into line with the new forces and aspirations making for social justice and freedom. The name changes, but the principle and policy argued for a quarter of a century remain".

Land&Liberty magazine continues to be published by a successor of the UCTLV.
