= Rastrick =

Village in West Yorkshire, England

Coordinates: 53.6921°N 1.7883°W

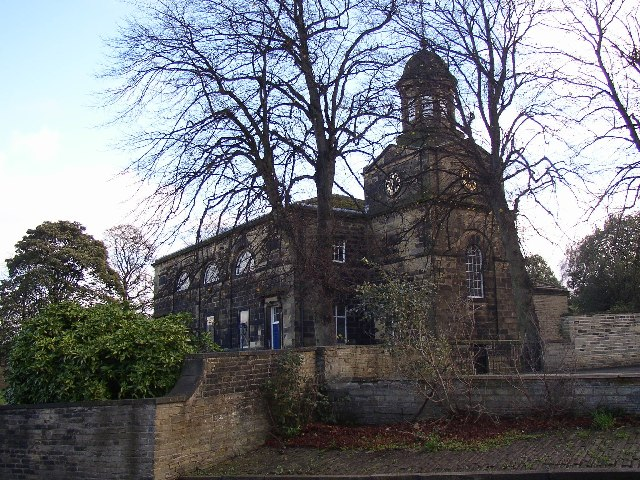
- St Matthew's Church on Church Street

- Location within West Yorkshire
- Population: 11,351 (Ward. 2011 census)
- OS grid reference: SE140217
- Metropolitan borough: Calderdale
- Metropolitan county: West Yorkshire
- Region: Yorkshire and the Humber
- Country: England
- Sovereign state: United Kingdom
- Post town: BRIGHOUSE
- Postcode district: HD6
- Dialling code: 01484
- Police: West Yorkshire
- Fire: West Yorkshire
- Ambulance: Yorkshire
- UK Parliament: Calder Valley

Rastrick is a village and local government ward in the county of West Yorkshire, England, between Halifax, 5 miles (8 km) north-west and Huddersfield, 4 miles (7 km) south. It is perhaps best known for its association, along with its neighbour Brighouse, 1 mile (2 km) north-east, with the Brighouse and Rastrick Brass Band. Along with Brighouse, it is part of Calderdale, but shares a Huddersfield postcode and phone number.

The population of the ward at the 2011 census was 11,351.

Historically part of the West Riding of Yorkshire, the village is on an incline facing north-east, the Parish Church, is vertically in the middle.

The area around the Parish Church is known as "Top o' t'Town" and the area around the Junction public house is known as "Bottom o' t'Town", this reflects the days when Rastrick had its own governance in the form of a Town Board whose Offices and lock-up were situated halfway between the two, on Ogden Lane.

Remains of a fort have been found at Castle Hill, just below Top o' t'Town.

== History ==
The name Rastrick is thought to be Viking in origin, with the "..ick" formation being common to many Norwegian Viking placenames, including "Jorvick", the Viking name for York.

Rastrick is well known for its pubs and the "Rastrick Run" is a popular pub crawl.

Rastrick, and the variation Raistrick are English surnames, originating from the area of the town.

== Governance ==
Rastrick is a village and a ward of Calderdale, a metropolitan borough within the ceremonial county of West Yorkshire in England. Rastrick was recorded on 1 July 1837 as part of the Halifax Registration District. Rastrick was formerly a township and chapelry in the parish of Halifax, in 1866 Rastrick became a separate civil parish, on 1 April 1915 the parish was abolished and merged with Brighouse. In 1911 the parish had a population of 8786. On 1 April 1938 Brighouse borough was transferred to the neighbouring registration district of 'Calder' and in 1974 it was abolished as part of the creation of Calderdale. Rastrick became a ward of Calderdale, with boundaries similar to those of the original parish.

== Geography ==
The ward of Rastrick is bordered to the north by the River Calder, which separates it from the ward of Brighouse. To the east and south the border with the Kirklees ward of Ashbrow roughly follows the M62 motorway. The traditional north western boundary between Elland and Rastrick was the edge of the escarpment, but the Elland Ward boundary is further east, encompassing parts of the old parish of Rastrick as far as Dewsbury Road and the crossroads with New Hey Road. The village is neighboured by the towns of Brighouse to the north and Elland to the west. The village of Fixby is to the south east and Ainley Top is to the south west.

== Community facilities ==
Rastrick has its own library which can be found on Crowtrees Lane and a doctors surgery at Rastrick Health Centre which is on Chapel Croft. A second doctors surgery is situated at the junction of Castle Avenue and Field Top Road.

== Landmarks ==
The highest point in the village is Round Hill which is adjacent to the grounds of Rastrick Cricket Club. This appears to be man made but is thought to be of natural origin. The Clough House Inn, on Clough Lane, is easily seen from the nearby M62. It was originally the White Lion Inn which was built in 1824, and is named as such on the 1835 and 1850 maps.

== Transport ==
The local railway station is named Brighouse but is in fact in Rastrick. An extensive bus service is provided by several operators, including First West Yorkshire, Team Pennine and South Pennine Community Transport, under the guidance of the West Yorkshire Combined Authority (brand name Metro).

== Education ==
Rastrick has several primary schools, including Carr Green Junior, Infant and Nursery School, Field Lane Primary School, Longroyde Primary School, and Woodhouse Primary School. Rastrick High School is the secondary school for the area. Highbury School is a specialist school on Lower Edge Road, and The William Henry Smith School is a non-maintained residential school located on Boothroyd Lane.

Until 1985, when the local authority embraced the comprehensive education system, Rastrick was served by Rastrick Grammar School on Ogden Lane and by a secondary school on Rastrick Common.

Rastrick Independent School was a private school located in the village that closed in 2019.

== Religious sites ==
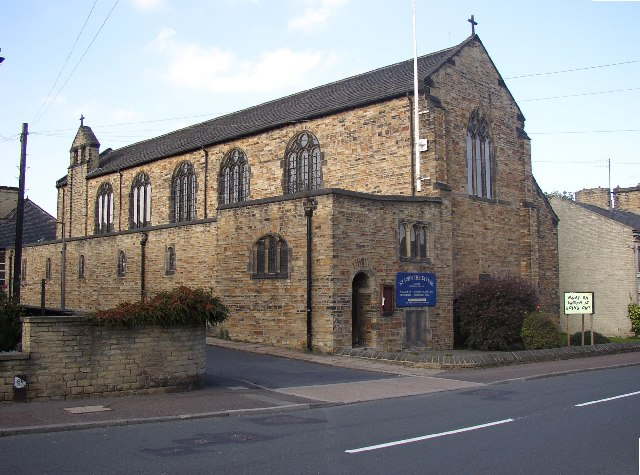
St John the Divine, built 1913

There are two Anglican churches in the village. St Matthew's Church, which is used jointly by the Anglicans and the Methodists and is situated on Church Street. Across the road from this Church is Rastrick Parish Centre, the church hall for St Matthew's Church. The Church of St John the Divine is located off Gooder Lane close to Brighouse railway station and was designed by Nicholson and Corlette in 1913. Both St Matthew's and St John's share the same Church of England vicar.

The non-denominational New Road Family Church is located on New Hey Road and operated as a church from 1837 until 2021. It began as a Sunday school, and continued to accommodate a school until 1912. In 1872 a Band of Hope Society was formed, and operated intermittently until the 1980s. During the Second World War the church housed a British Restaurant. Declining congregations in the 21st century, saw the church close in 2021. A book entitled The History of New Road Sunday School was written in 2012 by local historian Andrew Eccles and covers the entire history from 1837–2012.

Upper Edge Baptist Church is located on Dewsbury Road. The church traces its history to "Rossendale Church", which consisted of many Independent congregations located across the Rossendale Valley. Individual congregations became separate churches by about 1720. In 1837 a non-sectarian Sunday School was founded at Elland Edge, and the first school was built in 1841. The Upper Edge Church as founded on 19 October 1863.

== Sport ==
The cricket club in Rastrick, Rastrick Cricket Club, is found next to Round Hill, the highest point in Rastrick. Round Hill is a popular playing area for children in the area. A second cricket club, Badger Hill Cricket Club, formerly New Road Cricket Club, played on the field off New Hey Road.

Rastrick Bowling Club is situated at the bottom of Toothill Bank which has many local bowling teams and entertainment nights, and is also a good venue for parties. Rastrick Constitutional Club (also known as Top Club) has been situated on Church Street since 1886 and is known for its snooker teams.

== Notable people ==
Rastrick was the birthplace of religious writer Margaret Barber who wrote under the pseudonym Michael Fairless, and of the eccentric inventor Wilf Lunn.

Acclaimed travel writer, photographer, and adventure motorcyclist Christopher Paul Baker attended Rastrick Grammar School (1966–73).

1997 winner of the Nobel Prize in Chemistry, John Ernest Walker (born 1941), also attended Rastrick Grammar School (1952–59).

== See also ==
- Listed buildings in Rastrick
