= The Single Tax =

- Editor: John Paul
- Frequency: Monthly
- First issue: June 1894
- Final issue: June 1902
- Country: United Kingdom
- Language: English

The Single Tax was a monthly newspaper launched in June 1894 and published in Glasgow by the Scottish Land Restoration Union. The periodical changed its name in June 1902 to Land Values, which subsequently became, in June 1919, the contemporary magazine Land&Liberty.

According to its first and only editor, John Paul:

"The idea of the paper was first mooted by James O’Donnell Derrick, a young Glasgow Irishman who had joined the reorganised Scottish League shortly after it was formed in 1890. ... There were many conversations over the proposal, but no great enthusiasm for it. ... But Derrick was insistent. He was a man with a vision. He had made up his mind that the need of the land reform movement was a monthly organ."

The first issue set out "Our Mission":

"The Single Tax, briefly, is a proposal to take the values of land, apart from improvements, in taxation, for public purposes, and to relieve industry of the burdens of taxation. It is a simple remedy, merely a transferring of taxation from labour and the products of labour to land values. But we claim for it that it ... is the key to the solution of the wider problem now confronting civilisation, and which, as John Ruskin says, 'Society must settle or it will settle society'. ... We believe land monopoly to be the bottom cause of all the trouble, and we urge the remedy advanced by Henry George, the Single Tax..."

—with the 'Object' of "the restoration of the land to the people".

Proprietorship of the periodical passed in 1898/9 to the Scottish Single Tax League. Responsibility for publication passed in 1901 to Paul, and later in the year to Paul and associate Fred Verinder together.

The final issue of The Single Tax prior to its change of name, addressed its readers thus:

"We have pleaded and argued as politicians, not for twenty shillings in the pound, but for a beginning, for the taxation of land values, and that is how the question is coming along - the thin end of the wedge. The name Single Tax does not quite convey to those who have a listening ear for this 'expedient, necessary, and too-long-delayed measure of justice', that the paper is specially devoted to the taxation of land values. ... The change in the name of the paper is to assist all who are going with it, or who can go with it to a successful issue".

Ninety-six issues of the newspaper (in eight annual volumes) appeared in its eight years of publication.
