= Listed buildings in Rastrick =

Rastrick is a village and an unparished area in the metropolitan borough of Calderdale, West Yorkshire, England. Rastrick Ward contains 30 listed buildings that are recorded in the National Heritage List for England. Of these, two are listed at Grade II*, the middle of the three grades, and the others are at Grade II, the lowest grade. The listed buildings include houses and associated structures including lodges, cottages, a farmhouse, a church and a cross base in the churchyard, a lock on the Calder and Hebble Navigation, a guide post and two milestones, a carved stone set into a wall, a library, and a war memorial.

== Key ==
Grade	Criteria
II*	Particularly important buildings of more than special interest
II	Buildings of national importance and special interest

== Buildings ==
Name and location	Photograph	Date	Notes	Grade
Carved stone 53.68933°N 1.79349°W		10th century (probable)	The stone is set into the wall in front of a house, and is carved with a spiral motif.	II
Cross base 53.69066°N 1.79204°W		10th or 11th century	The cross base is in the churchyard of St Matthew's Church. It consists of a large stone block with tapering sides and an indentation on the top for the shaft. The four faces have moulded edges, two faces have carving in relief of foliated vine scroll, there is interlace decoration on the side facing the street, and the other face is plain. The cross base is also a scheduled monument.	II*
11 and 13 Church Street; 53.69090°N 1.79138°W		Late 16th century	A house that was later altered and converted into two dwellings. The building has a timber framed core encased in stone, it is partly rendered, and has a pantile roof. There are two storeys, an L-shaped plan and four bays. The windows are a mixture, and include casements and sashes, some of which are sliding. There is surviving timber framing inside No. 11.	II
13 and 15 Woodhouse Lane; 53.69279°N 1.77135°W	—	Early 17th century	A rendered stone house with quoins and a stone slate roof. There are two storeys, a gabled, front, and a single-storey wing to the south. The doorway has composite jambs and a four-centred arched lintel. Most of the windows are double chamfered and mullioned, and some have hood moulds.	II
Lillands Farmhouse; 53.70014°N 1.79128°W	—	1741	The farmhouse is in stone with a stone slate roof. There are two storeys, a front with an L-shaped plan, consisting of a two-bay hall range, and a projecting gabled cross-wing on the left, and the rear has an F-shaped plan also with a kitchen wing and single-story outshut. In the hall range is a doorway with a decorative dated lintel. Most of the windows are mullioned; some have been replaced by sashes.	II
Firth House; 53.68841°N 1.77084°W	—	Mid to late 18th century	A pair of mirror image cottages combined into one, it is in stone with quoins, a stone slate two-span roof, and two storeys. In the centre are paired doorways with composite jambs, and the windows are mullioned. The right gable end contains a blocked segmental-arched cart entry, above which is a taking-in door that has been converted into a window.	II
12 Closes Road; 53.69751°N 1.78939°W	—	Late 18th century	A stone house, partly rendered, with quoins, a band, and a stone slate roof. There are two storeys and a symmetrical front of three bays. The doorway has an architrave and a triangular pediment, and the windows have plain surrounds and modern glazing.	II
115 Rastrick Common; 53.69160°N 1.78769°W		Late 18th century	A stone house with a stone slate roof, two storeys, and a symmetrical front of five bays. The central doorway has a plain surround. The windows on the front are sashes, and on the sides and rear are mullioned windows.	II
Stable, 115 Rastrick Common; 53.69148°N 1.78751°W	—	Late 18th century	The stable is in stone with a hipped stone slate roof. There are three bays, and a central segmental-arched cart entry flanked by blind arches containing windows. Above each bay is a bull's eye window, and at the rear is a Venetian window under a small gable.	II
2 and 4 Woodhouse Lane; 53.69380°N 1.77076°W		Late 18th century	A pair of stone cottages with a stone slate roof. There are two storeys, No. 2 has one bay, and No. 4, which is slightly higher and to the left, has a symmetrical front of two bays. The windows are mullioned, both cottages have doorways with monolithic jambs, and No. 4 also has a gabled porch.	II
Anchor Pit Lock; 53.69240°N 1.75991°W		Late 18th century	The lock is at the entrance to the Calder and Hebble Navigation from the River Calder. It is in stone with rectangular stone cappings, curved ends, and recesses for gates at both ends. There are iron mooring hooks.	II
Garden Pavillion, Toothill Court; 53.68640°N 1.78471°W	—	Late 18th century	The pavilion was moved to its present site in the walled garden in the 20th century. It is in cast iron with later glazing. The columns carry an anthemion frieze, and a projecting moulded cornice, and there is a sight segmental curve on one side.	II
Guide Post; 53.68751°N 1.79766°W		1787	The guide post stands at a road junction, and consists of an upright stone with two faces. It is inscribed with the date, and hands pointing the directions to Elland, Leeds, Bradford, and Huddersfield.	II
St Matthew's Church; 53.69052°N 1.79168°W		1796–98	The church is in stone with a slate roof. It consists of a nave with a semicircular apse at the east end and a west tower. The tower is square and has a clock face, above which is a pediment, and a circular cupola with Doric columns, an entablature, a dome, and a decorative weathervane. The body of the church has five bays, with doorways in the outer bays that have architraves and cornices on consoles. The middle three bays contain windows with architraves over which are lunettes, and all are contained in arched recesses.	II*
Castle Hill House; 53.69163°N 1.79059°W		c.1800	A small country house later divided into five units, it is in stone with stone slate roofs and two storeys. On the east front is a recessed bay containing two porches with Doric columns and two round-headed doorways. To the left is a square bay window, and to the right a Venetian window. Most of the other windows are sashes, and there are some casement windows.	II
5, 7 and 9 Woodhouse Lane; 53.69304°N 1.77156°W	—	Late 18th or early 19th century	A row of stone cottages, rendered on the right, with a stone slate roof. There are two storeys, and an L-shaped plan. Each cottage has one bay, a doorway with monolithic jambs, and mullioned windows.	II
Toothill Court; 53.68658°N 1.78395°W	—	Late 18th to early 19th century	The service range of Toothill Hall consists of three houses, a barn and a stable range enclosing three sides of a courtyard. The buildings are in stone with quoins, stone slate roofs with coped gables and kneelers, and two storeys. The barn has two segmental-arched cart entries above which is a circle for a clock face, four-centred arched vents, and doorways with monolithic jambs. The houses have similar doorways and mullioned windows.	II
Toothill Hall; 53.68628°N 1.78396°W	—	1823	The house is in stone on a plinth, with a sill band, a moulded eaves cornice, and a hipped slate roof. There are two storeys, a symmetrical front of five bays, and a later single-storey extension. In the centre is a porch with Roman Doric columns and a pediment, and the doorway has an arched head and a fanlight. The windows are sashes, and at the rear is a single-storey segmental bow window.	II
6 Crowtress Lane; 53.69052°N 1.79258°W	—	Early 19th century	A pair of stone cottages, combined into one, with a stone slate roof. There are two storeys and two bays. On the front are two doorways with monolithic jambs, one of which is blocked, and the windows are mullioned.	II
14 and 14A Crowtrees Lane; 53.68990°N 1.79332°W		Early 19th century	A pair of stone cottages with a stone slate roof, two storeys, a double-depth plan, and three bays. On the front are paired doorways with monolithic jambs, one of which is blocked, and the windows are mullioned.	II
1, 3 and 5 Firth House Lane and cow shed 53.68862°N 1.77077°W		Early 19th century	A row of three cottages, with an attached a warehouse and cow shed, they are in stone with a stone slate roof. There are two storeys, and the cow shed at the right is gabled. The doorways have monolithic jambs, and the windows are mullioned.	II
1 Stonelea Drive; 53.68606°N 1.79702°W		Early 19th century	Two cottages that were converted into a single dwelling in the 1980s, it is in stone with a stone slate roof. There are two storeys and a basement, and a front of four bays. In the centre are paired doorways, the right doorway has been converted into a windows, the other windows are mullioned, and there is one single-light window.	II
Former Lodge, Rastrick House; 53.69214°N 1.79469°W		Early 19th century	The former lodge is in stone on a plinth, with a hipped slate roof. The main block has one storey and a front of three bays, and at the side and rear are two-story one-bay wings. In the centre is a doorway, and the windows are sashes.	II
Gate, railings and gate piers, Rastrick House; 53.69209°N 1.79483°W	—	Early 19th century	The gate piers are in stone. The two piers flanking the gate are round, and quadrant walls lead to outer square panelled piers. The gates and railings are in wrought iron with Greek key decoration.	II
1 and 1A Church Street; 53.69103°N 1.79084°W		19th century	A pair of houses, at one time a public house, they are in stone with a cornice and a hipped slate roof. There are two storeys and three bays. The doorway has monolithic jambs and a cornice, and above it is a mark from the former inn sign. The outer bays in the ground floor contain three-light mullioned windows in semicircular-arched recesses. The windows in the upper floor have plain surrounds, and in the left return is a Venetian window.	II
Lodge, Toothill Hall; 53.68619°N 1.78203°W	—	Mid 19th century	The lodge is in stone with a moulded cornice and a slate roof. There is a single storey, and a rectangular plan with a three-sided front. In the centre is a doorway with monolithic jambs, and the side faces contain sash windows.	II
Milestone opposite the Lodge to Toothill Hall; 53.68621°N 1.78173°W		Mid 19th century	The milestone is on the east side of Huddersfield Road (A641 road). It has an arched head and two projecting faces, and is overlaid with cast iron, The head is inscribed "BRADFORD & HUDDERSFIELD ROAD" "RASTRICK" and the faces indicate the distances to Huddersfield, Bradford, and Brighouse Town Hall. Also on the milestone are details of the manufacturer.	II
Milestone near St Matthew's Vicarage; 53.69096°N 1.79031°W		Late 19th century	The milestone has an arched head and two projecting faces, and is overlaid with cast iron, The head is inscribed "HUDDERSFIELD & NEW HEY ROAD" "BRANCH" "RASTRICK" and the faces indicate the distances to Rochdale, Junction, Elland, and Brighouse.	II
Rastrick Library; 53.68892°N 1.79500°W		1912	The library is in stone with a slate roof, it has one storey and attics, and a symmetrical front of seven bays. In the centre, steps lead up to an arched doorway above which is a decorative pedimented gable containing an inscription and the Yorkshire rose. The outer two bays also have pedimented gables, and contain attic windows. The windows in the ground floor are glazed with a round-arched central light, and all the gables contain heraldic carvings in the apex.	II
War memorial 53.68884°N 1.79468°W		1923	The war memorial stands in a garden in front of Rastrick Library. It is in York stone, and consists of a plain obelisk on a three-tiered plinth. On the front of the plinth are inscriptions relating to both World Wars, and on the sides are the names of those lost in the First World War.	II
