= The Corruption of Economics =

Georgist critique of Neo-Classical economics

The Corruption of Economics is a 1994 book by Mason Gaffney and Fred Harrison, containing a critique of neoclassical economics and an account of the alleged suppression of the economic ideas of Henry George.

== Content ==
The book consists of four essays. Harrison contributed two essays, Prologue: Who's Afraid of Henry George? and The Georgist Paradigm, and one co-written with Kris Feder, Postscript on neo-classical economics: South Africa 1994: Countdown to Disaster.

In the introduction to A Philosophy for a Fair Society (1994) by Michael Hudson, G. J. Miller and Kris Feder, Harrison gave a summary:

The Georgist paradigm infuriated the aristocratic landlords. They strenuously schemed to suppress public understanding of its virtues. They initiated political action against the policy. In the United States, they even funded universities and professorships to degrade Henry George's thesis.

James K. Galbraith, reviewing the second edition (2006), described the argument:

In The Corruption of Economics, Gaffney and fellow Georgist Fred Harrison begin their inquiry with the observation that America’s nineteenth-century universities, like its railroads, were land-grant institutions, vested with warrants to vast acreages under the 1862 Morrill Act. They were thus not only noble outposts of practical learning but also highly appealing vehicles for enterprising captains of land speculation. For these men, to found and run a university combined honor, influence, glory, and a not inconsiderable chance to become very rich. But the Georgist idea that land alone should be taxed – so as not to tax either profits or wages – threatened to create a dangerous political alliance between capital and labor against the landlord. The land-grant universities therefore hired and promoted a retinue of mediocrities willing to wage a war of derision and dismissal against George’s noxious creed. These were the founders of modern American economics, and Gaffney and Harrison document their words, commitments, careerism, and venality in rich detail, leaving no doubt about their true characters and beliefs.

Gaffney's essay in the book, Neo-Classical Economics as a Stratagem against Henry George, gave as examples of Georgists who lost university positions Scott Nearing and Allen H. Eaton.

== Reception ==
A 1996 review by Murray Milgate calls Gaffney's essay "interesting, provocative, and witty". He states that "Gaffney does highlight the unfolding tension between the reforming ideals of British economists and the ideology of moderate British socialists (to whom George was so important at the time)". He doubts whether Gaffney makes the case that the Chicago school of economics was involved in trying to discredit George, as others were, and concludes that Alfred Marshall was correct in 1884 to judge that George's influence on economics would be transient. A negative review by Herbert Gintis, in which he wrote that "It is not plausible that the neoclassical dog is wagged by the Georgian stump of a tail", had a reply in the form of an animadversion by Edward J. Dobson of the School of Cooperative Individualism.

The book was called a "conspiratorial history" by Mark Skousen. In reviewing The Corruption of Economics and A Philosophy for a Fair Society, with Land and Taxation (1995) by Nicolaus Tideman, all three works being published in the "Georgist Paradigm Series" by Harrison as director of the Centre for Incentive Taxation, Mark Blaug wrote:

There is no doubt that the emergence of the marginal productivity theory in the 1880s was stimulated by the need to find an answer to Henry George's indictment of the prevailing distribution of income, but that is not to say that the whole of the rise of neoclassical economics can be explained as a defence against Georgism[...]

He finds that Gaffney's essay essentially argues in that way; and cites Critics of Henry George. A Century Appraisal of their Strictures on Progress and Poverty (1979) by Robert V. Andelson as a superior source for the debate.
