= Christopher Paul Baker =

English travel writer and photographer

Christopher P. Baker
- Born: Christopher Paul Baker; 15 June 1955 (age 71); Pontefract, Yorkshire, England
- Occupations: Travel writer, photographer, public speaker, tour leader, adventure motorcyclist, Cuba expert
- Years active: 1980–present
- Notable work: Mi Moto Fidel: Motorcycling Through Castro's Cuba
- Television: ABC, CCTV, CNN, Fox News Channel
- Awards: Lowell Thomas Award 2008 'Travel Journalist of the Year'
- Website: http://www.christopherpbaker.com/

Christopher P. Baker (born 15 June 1955) is a professional travel writer and photographer, adventure motorcyclist, tour leader, and Cuba expert, and the 2008 Lowell Thomas Award 'Travel Journalist of the Year.' He is a contributor to magazines and other publications worldwide, and is the author of travel guidebooks for publishers such as Dorling Kindersley, Lonely Planet, Moon Publications, and National Geographic.

He is best known for his award-winning literary travelog, Mi Moto Fidel: Motorcycling Through Castro's Cuba.

Baker has appeared on dozens of radio and TV outlets as a Cuba expert, including on CCTV, CNN, Fox News Channel, NBC, NPR, and Travel with Rick Steves,. He is a public speaker and has twice addressed National Geographic Live!

He is currently partnered with actor-singer David Soul in producing a cinematic documentary about the restoration of Ernest Hemingway's 1955 Chrysler New Yorker convertible, in Havana.

He is also well known as an adventure moto-journalist specializing in travel reports on international motorcycling for such publications as Adventure Motorcyclist, CNN Travel, Motorcyclist, National Geographic Traveler, and Robb Report.

== Education ==
Baker was educated at Rastrick Grammar School, in Brighouse, Calderdale, Yorkshire. In 1976 he received a BA (Honours) in Geography from University College London, during which time he participated in a university exchange program at Kraków, Poland; and in two Sahara research expeditions. The following year he attended the graduate Centre for Latin American Studies, at the University of Liverpool, where he received a Masters following his thesis on agrarian reform and guerrilla insurrection in Colombia. In 1977, he returned to the University of London, received a teaching diploma from the Institute of Education in 1978, and spent brief periods teaching at schools in London between periods of travel in Europe and North America.

His first travel article appeared in the Brighouse Echo as dispatches from the United States. He also published articles on agrarian reform for Land&Liberty, the publication of the Henry George Foundation of Great Britain.

== Career ==
In 1980, Baker relocated to California, where he received a Scripps Howard Foundation Scholarship to attend the UC Berkeley Graduate School of Journalism. He instead married a travel agent, Kristen Birner, and started work for Adventure Center, a wholesaler and retailer of international adventure travel. His principal duties included marketing plus brochure production. In 1981 he led a travel agent familiarization trip to New Zealand, resulting in publication of his first travel story in the US for TravelAge West.

He launched his career as a travel writer and photographer in 1982 and initially specialized in international adventure travel. His articles included first-person reports on such activities as bicycling in Bali, hiking to Mount Everest, whitewater rafting in Papua New Guinea, and natural history cruising in the Galapagos Islands. In 1984 he became a contributing editor for International Travel News, specializing in Southeast Asia. That year he also planned his first group tour to Britain and for the next six years operated tours to Britain under British Pride Tours. In 1989 and 1990 he operated shopping tours to Hong Kong and Korea with former fashion model Kim Mason. He continued to organize and manage trips to Britain until 1990, following which he dedicated himself exclusively to his travel writing and photography career.

He was a founding member of the Bay Area Travel Writers. in 1982.

Baker's self-syndicated stories appeared in newspapers throughout the United States and Canada, including front-page stories in the Baltimore Sun, Boston Globe, Chicago Tribune, The Los Angeles Times, Miami Herald, New York Post, San Francisco Examiner, and Toronto Globe & Mail. His other credits have included stories in more than 200 magazines, including BBC World, Geographical Magazine (Royal Geographical Society), Elle, National Wildlife, Newsweek International, and the South China Morning Post, and dozens of airline in-flight magazines. He was a regular contributor to Caribbean Travel & Life, winning many awards for his self-illustrated stories.

He was also in demand as a commercial copy-writer in the specialist travel industry. His skills as a commercial writer earned him three national awards for best catalogs for the adventure travel company Backroads.

In 1989, Baker was admitted to the Society of American Travel Writers. That year he was also commissioned to write his first guidebook, resulting in publication of the Costa Rica Handbook (now Moon Costa Rica). His guidebook won the Independent Book Publishers Association 1996 Benjamin Franklin Award. Baker's first Lonely Planet guidebook, on Jamaica, was followed by Lonely Planet's guidebook to The Bahamas & Turks & Caicos). and by the Cuba Handbook (now Moon Cuba

During the 1990s and early millennium years he taught travel writing and photography classes for The Learning Annex, in San Francisco, and in 2006 was inducted as a permanent faculty member in the prestigious annual SATW Institute for Travel Writing & Photography.

In 1996, Baker shipped his BMW R100GS motorcycle to Cuba and rode 7,000 miles (11,000 km) around the island. The journey resulted in publication of numerous magazine articles, plus Mi Moto Fidel: Motorcycling Through Castro's Cuba (National Geographic Adventure Press, 2001), a literary travelog that won both the Lowell Thomas Award as 'Travel Book of the Year' and the North American Travel Journalists Association's 'Grand Prize.' The judges of the Lowell Thomas Award, offered by the Society of American Travel Writers Foundation, said: "This is a wonderful adventure book… a meditation on philosophy, politics, and the possibilities of physical love. It has the depth of a novel and the feeling of a great love story."

Baker has since authored more than two dozen other books, including Moon Spotlight Havana, and a self-illustrated coffee-table book Cuba Classics: A Celebration of Vintage American Automobiles, plus guidebooks to Costa Rica, Colombia, Cuba, Dominican Republic, and Panama in the National Geographic Traveler series;, as well as numerous books for Dorling Kindersley.

He has also contributed chapters to such anthologies as Literary Trips: Following in the Footsteps of Fame, Motorcycle Messengers: Tales from the Road by Writers who Ride, Travelers Tales: Cuba and Travelers Tales: Food, plus Voyages: The Romance of Cruising and World Travel: A Guide to International Ecojourneys.

Baker continues to write and photograph for publications around the globe. He is a regular contributor to such publications as National Geographic Traveler and Robb Report, as well as such Internet sites as CNN Travel, Expedia, and Luxury Latin America.

His many awards include being named 'Travel Journalist of the Year' by the Jamaica Tourist Board (1998, Marcia Vickery-Wallace Memorial Award); the Caribbean Tourism Organization (2005); and the Society of American Travel Writers Foundation (2008).

Baker is also a professional photographer and has illustrated scores of books and magazine articles. His work was formerly represented by Lonely Planet Images photo stock agency, and is today represented by Getty Images and Alamy. He is also a National Geographic contributing photographer and has photographed travel books on Colombia and Costa Rica on assignment for National Geographic. He has led photo workshops to Costa Rica and Cuba for National Geographic Expeditions and Santa Fe Photographic Workshops.

Baker is considered a Cuba expert and has been acclaimed by National Geographic as "one of the world's leading authorities on Cuba travel and culture." He has visited Cuba more than 100 times and in October 2003 met with Fidel Castro at the Palacio de Convenciones in Havana. He is familiar with the island's culture, society, history, politics, and economics, and since 2011 has led more than 60 tours to Cuba on behalf of National Geographic Expeditions, Santa Fe Photographic Workshops, and MotoDiscovery, a Texas-based adventure motorcycle tour company. In 2013 he led the first group motorcycle tours of Cuba for U.S. citizens since the Revolution, and specializes in arranging and leading customized group motorcycle tours of Cuba. He has also led tours to Colombia, Costa Rica, and Panama on behalf of National Geographic Expeditions.

He is also known as an adventure motorcycle journalist and has written and photographed for such motorcycle publications as Adventure Motorcyclist, BMW Motorcycle Magazine, Motorcyclist, Motorrad & Reisen, and Rider. He speaks frequently about adventure motorcycling at such venues as the BMW Motorcycle Owners of America annual reunion and Horizons Unlimited. In April/May 2015 Baker toured South Africa to test ride the 2015 Indian Roadmaster on behalf of Indian Motorcycle Company, reporting for magazines such as Rider and Robb Report.

In April 2011, Baker was the first foreign journalist to photograph and report the existence of Ernest Hemingway's long-lost and recently rediscovered 1955 Chrysler New Yorker convertible, in Havana. In 2012 Baker partnered with actor-singer David Soul to produce a cinematic documentary about the restoration of Hemingway's Chrysler. The documentary, in which Baker plays a fixer, translator and sidekick to David Soul, is being produced by London-based Red Earth Studio.

Baker is a frequent public speaker, specializing in Cuba. He has addressed the National Press Club, National Geographic Live!, and World Affairs Councils of America, among others. His is also a former faculty member of Cunard Line and Holland America Line, acting as guest speaker and port-of-call lecturer aboard ships cruising the Caribbean and South America seaboard. He has also been the keynote speaker at the North American Travel Journalist Association's national convention (2010) and TBEX Travel Bloggers Exchange (2012)

Baker has been profiled in USA Today and Geographical Magazine and has been interviewed about Cuba on ABC, CBS, CCTV, CNN, Fox News Channel, NBC, NPR, and dozens of other radio & TV outlets. He makes regular appearances on Travel with Rick Steves, a travel radio show hosted by Rick Steves.

== Personal life ==
Baker was born in Pontefract, England. He currently lives in Palm Springs, California.

== Bibliography ==
- Back Roads California (Dorling Kindersley)
- Bahamas and Turks & Caicos (Lonely Planet)
- Cuba Classics: A Celebration of Vintage American Automobiles (Interlink)
- Eyewitness Top 10 Cuba (Dorling Kindersley)
- Eyewitness Top 10 California Wine Country (Dorling Kindersley)
- Eyewitness Top 10 Puerto Rico (Dorling Kindersley)
- Eyewitness Travel Guide Caribbean (Dorling Kindersley), co-authored
- Eyewitness Travel Guide to Costa Rica (Dorling Kindersley)
- Great Destinations: Palm Springs and Desert Resorts (Countryman Press)
- Great Destinations: Panama (Countryman Press)
- Great Destinations: Puerto Rico (Countryman Press)
- Jamaica (Lonely Planet)
- Mi Moto Fidel: Motorcycling Through Castros' Cuba (National Geographic Adventure Press)
- Moon Costa Rica (Avalon Travel Publishing)
- Moon Cuba (Avalon Travel Publishing)
- Moon Spotlight Havana (Avalon Travel Publishing)
- National Geographic Traveler Colombia (National Geographic Society)
- National Geographic Traveler Costa Rica (National Geographic Society)
- National Geographic Traveler Cuba (National Geographic Society)
- National Geographic Traveler Dominican Republic (National Geographic Society)
- National Geographic Traveler Panama (National Geographic Society)
- Illustrated Guide to Jamaica (NTC Publishing/Thomas Cook Publishing)
- Trav'bug California (Prentice Hall; with Judy Wade)
- Travelers Companion Guide to Costa Rica (Globe Pequot, 3rd ed.)
