= Rastrick Independent School =

The Rastrick Independent School
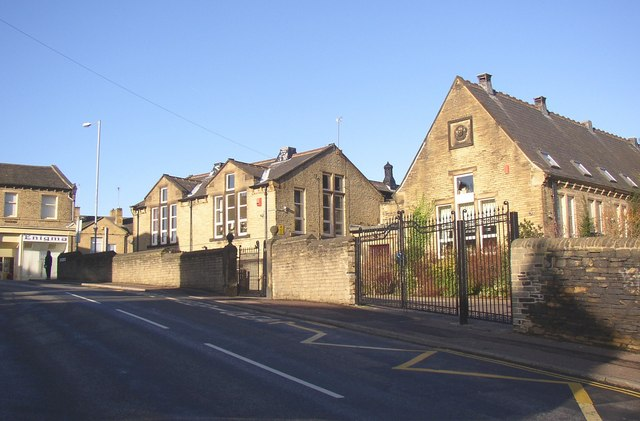

Location
- Ogden Lane; Rastrick, West Yorkshire, HD6 3HF; England; 53°41′27″N 1°47′22″W

Information
- Type: Private school
- Headmistress: Mrs Susan A Vaughey
- Gender: Mixed-sex education
- Age: 0 to 16
- Website: http://www.rastrickschool.co.uk/

The Rastrick Independent School was a private school in Rastrick in the Metropolitan Borough of Calderdale, West Yorkshire, England. Opened in 1994 the school closed at very short notice in August 2019.

The school had a capacity of 482 pupils but only had around 70 enrolled at the time of its closure.
