= Land&Liberty =

British political economics magazine

- Format: Quarterly magazine
- Owner: Henry George Foundation of Great Britain
- Editor: Joseph Milne
- Founded: June 1894 (as The Single Tax)
- Headquarters: 212 Piccadilly; London; W1J 9HG; England
- Price: £2.50 €3.00; DKK25.00; USD$5.00; A$5.50
- ISSN: 0023-7574
- Website: LandandLiberty.net

Land&Liberty is a quarterly magazine of popular political economics: its focus is the relationship between land and natural resource rights and 21st century economic policy. Published in the UK it covers international affairs and events from a global perspective.

The magazine contains major features, editorial and comment, news and reports, reviews, interviews and readers' letters.

== Nature and focus of the magazine ==
Land&Liberty has no political alignment in the conventional sense. However the magazine is not editorially neutral on issues. Land&Liberty's key concern is how the global common wealth should be used, and it aims to demonstrate that this question is key to effective and just public policy—to the sustainable bridging of private life, the public sector and common resources. Land&Liberty's focus therefore is radical justice in property rights and taxation.

== Modern global influence ==
Land&Liberty forecast the 2008 global crisis and housing crash. In the middle of the economic optimism of 2004, it wrote: "There’s trouble ahead. A housing crash is coming." Its 'Crash' cover story issue was published in the first week of September 2007, just days before the events at Northern Rock that caught the economic establishment unawares.

Since the 1980s Land&Liberty has been an influence on the political opposition within Zimbabwe. In August 2008, the Movement for Democratic Change presented their political programme for the coalition government that they had entered into with the Zimbabwe African National Union - Patriotic Front (ZANU-PF) party. It included a policy for raising public revenue from a tax on land values, as advocated by Land&Liberty: "the MDC will through an Act of Parliament establish a Land Commission whose mandate is to…[i]ntroduce an equitable Land Tax". The party's Policy Coordinator General, Eddie Cross, wrote in a 2009 article in Land&Liberty that his party's new policies would help ensure that "secure communities will become free communities with the capacity to confront and control those in charge of the state".

== History ==
Land&Liberty is the world's longest-running periodical advocating the social reform advanced by Henry George—of whom Albert Einstein once said: "one cannot imagine a more beautiful combination of intellectual keenness, artistic form and fervent love of justice".

Land&Liberty was launched in June 1894 under the title The Single Tax, published as "The Organ of the Scottish Land Restoration Union". Perhaps foreseeing George Bernard Shaw’s later remark, in 1928, that "the Single Taxers are not wrong in principle; but they are behind the times", the periodical changed its title in 1902 to Land Values and subsequently in 1919 to Land&Liberty.

=== Origin ===
The periodical was initially the campaigning voice of the Scottish Land Restoration Union. The Union and its antecedents were a contemporary political force in Scotland, launching the career of Keir Hardie, the first socialist elected to the UK Parliament, who went on to become the Labour Party's first leader. Inspired by Henry George, the Union's activism helped deliver—through its publication The Single Tax: "an American impulse behind the Scottish labor movement, which became historic in making the modern Labour party, and in forging the character of twentieth-century Britain." Yet within its first year—recording historic shudders in the evolution of British socialism and the birth of the Labour party—the magazine was writing: "what have the Labour Party to offer us? Anything or everything but the single tax.".

=== Early contributors ===
Early contributions to the magazine included original writing by Henry George (including first publishings of private material), Arthur Withy, Louis F Post and Leo Tolstoy (again including first publishings of private material).

The magazine published its correspondence from around the world, such as from New Zealand's Patrick O'Regan, and enjoyed secondary publishing rights from writers and thinkers such as Mark Twain and Herbert Spencer.

=== The twentieth century ===
Before the magazine's change of name, Land Values, vol. XXI, no. 244, September 1914 reported the outbreak of World War I.

Through the years Land&Liberty has reported on and contributed to the debate on major world events. It has provided analyses of, among other things, the 'Irish Problem', the Scottish crofting movement and the Highland Clearances, the genesis of two World Wars, the creation of the United Nations and the other global institutions, the formulation of the UN Universal Declaration of Human Rights, Europe's withdrawal from empire's colonial project, and the middle east conflict.

The paper reported extensively the events surrounding the 1909 UK People's Budget, and the resultant House of Lords reform—contributing a major voice in the contemporary public debate. The paper's reporters recorded a unique archive of speeches by Lloyd George, Churchill, Asquith and Campbell-Bannerman among others, as they toured the country in support of their cause.

== Recent writing ==
Recent contributors to Land&Liberty include former Danish MP and MEP Ib Christensen, Fred Harrison, Mason Gaffney, Michael Hudson, the English High Court Judge Sir Kenneth Jupp, James Robertson and (now former) Friends of the Earth director Charles Secrett. Public figures interviewed in Land&Liberty in recent years include John Bird, Bob Kiley, Alastair McIntosh, George Monbiot and Steve Norris. Land&Liberty's original output is periodically taken up by the publishing mainstream.

Land&Liberty, vol. 115, no. 1223, winter 2008/9 featured policy analysis for newly elected President Barack Obama

== Editors ==
- John Paul 1894-1933 (died in office)
- Arthur W Madsen 1933-1957 (died in office)
- Peter R Stubbings 1957–1961
- Vic Blundell 1961-1976 (retaining an editorial overview into the eighties)
- Ray B Linley 1976–1978
- Fred Harrison 1978–2002
- Tony Vickers (Managing) with Ciaran Jennings (Editor) 2002
- Peter Gibb 2002-2009
- John Triggs 2010–2013
- Joseph Milne 2014 -

== Publishers ==
Land&Liberty is published by the Henry George Foundation of Great Britain, an independent economic and social justice think tank and public education group. The Foundation and its immediate organisational predecessors have been proprietors since 1907, before which the magazine was owned by Scottish land reform groups.

- Scottish Land Restoration Union 1894–1897
- John Paul 1897–1901
- John Paul & Fred Verinder 1901–1904
- John Paul 1904–1933
- United Committee for the Taxation of Land Values 1933–1946
- Land & Liberty Press Ltd 1946–1986
- Land and Liberty International 1986–1996
- Henry George Foundation of GB Ltd 1996-

== Proprietors ==
- Scottish Land Restoration Union 1894-1898/9
- Scottish Single Tax League 1898/9-1904
- Scottish League for the Taxation of Land Values 1904–1907
- United Committee for the Taxation of Land Values 1907-1991
- Centre for Incentive Taxation and The Henry George Institute (NY) 1991–1996
- Henry George Foundation 1996-
