= Rastrick High School =

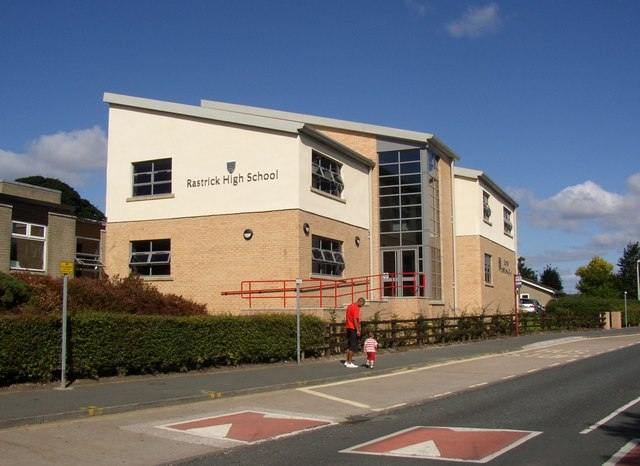

Location
- Field Top Road; Rastrick, West Yorkshire, HD6 3XB; England; 53°41′47″N 1°47′30″W

Information
- Type: Academy
- Motto: "Working together for individual success."
- Established: 1985
- Local authority: Calderdale
- Specialist: Music
- Department for Education URN: 137444 Tables
- Ofsted: Reports
- Headteacher: Matthew Williams
- Gender: Mixed-sex education
- Age: 11 to 16
- Enrolment: 1521
- Website: http://www.rastrick.calderdale.sch.uk/

Rastrick High School is a mixed-gender 11–16 secondary school in Rastrick, West Yorkshire, England.

== History ==
The school was formed in 1985 following the merger of Rastrick Grammar School and Reinswood Secondary School. However, its history can be traced back to 1621. The school is a technology specialist school and provides design and technology specialist equipment for student use.

== Alumni ==
- Scott Benton, Conservative MP from 2019 to 2024 Blackpool South (1998–2005)

=== Rastrick Grammar School ===
- Christopher Paul Baker, travel writer and photographer, and adventure motorcyclist
- Richard Blakey a former England and Yorkshire cricketer.
- John Ellis, Labour MP for Bristol North West from 1966 to 1970 and Brigg and Scunthorpe
- Sir (Albert) Larry Lamb, editor of the Daily Express from 1983 to 1986 and of The Sun from 1969 to 1972 and 1975 to 1981
- Sir John E. Walker, professor of molecular bioenergetics at the University of Cambridge since 2002, and winner of the Nobel Prize in Chemistry in 1997 for discovery of an enzyme mechanism in the synthesis of adenosine triphosphate (ATP)
