= Scottish League for the Taxation of Land Values =

- Formation: 1890
- Type: NGO
- Headquarters: Glasgow
- President: Professor Roger Sandilands
- Secretary & Treasurer: Ian Sillars

The Scottish League for the Taxation of Land Values is an independent national campaigning organisation that advocates radical reform of Scotland's system of taxation. Known as The Scottish League, the organisation advances the programme of the nineteenth-century American social reformer Henry George. The League publishes books and other material, and is a participant in the ongoing public debate over the future of Scotland's land and tax system.

The Scottish League was constituted in 1890, emerging out of the complex reorganisation that year of the Scottish Land Restoration League. It campaigned vigorously during the public and parliamentary debate surrounding the Land Values (Scotland) Bill at the turn of the twentieth century. That bill was initiated at the League's request, and intended to be prototype UK legislation. Viscount Ridley, speaking in the House of Lords in 1908 (before the reforming Parliament Act 1911), at the second reading of the ill-starred bill, claimed that:

Behind this Bill is the Scottish League for the Taxation of Land Values, and the real support that the Bill gets is from gentlemen who think it would be to the advantage of this country to tax all land values out of existence.... I ask your Lordships to reject the Bill because I believe it to be unfair, incomplete, and impracticable, and that no amount of amendment or modification could affect the principle of the Bill.... It is begotten by fanatical societies out of an ignorant Government; it stands...unsound and vicious.

The Bill was "passed by the House of Commons by a great majority in 1907, but was rejected by the Lords".

The Scottish League was also firmly engaged in the legislative process surrounding the 1931 Finance Bill, which it came to repudiate. Sir John Simon, Secretary of State for Foreign Affairs and future Chancellor of the Exchequer, addressed the Commons:

Let us consider whether after three weeks of existence this Bill is in a very happy condition…. We must not suppose that the cursing comes only from the critics, who might be thought to be naturally opposed to this system of taxation. I hold in my hand a communication from the Scottish League for the Taxation of Land Values. I read it with interest, because we know that if one could look anywhere for the pure milk of the word on this subject it would be to the Scottish League for the Taxation of Land Values. This is what it says: "The present proposals of the Chancellor of the Exchequer will penalise the landowners who are putting their land to the best possible use just as much as it punishes the owners who are holding land idle, or making a partial use of it. This in itself condemns the present proposals, and marks the scheme as a political stunt“.

The Scottish League has been actively involved in Glasgow City Council's 2009 initiative to reform local taxation on the basis of land values.

The Scottish League was one-time proprietor (1904–1907) of the modern periodical Land&Liberty, published then under the title Land Values.
