= St Matthew's Church, Rastrick =

- Anglican and Methodist; Church of St Matthew
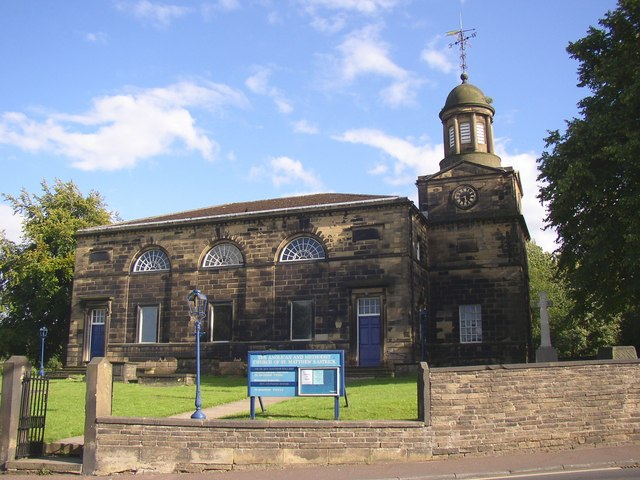
- St Matthew's Church, Rastrick
- 53°41′26″N 1°47′30″W
- OS grid reference: SE 13854 21578
- Location: Church Street, Rastrick, Brighouse, West Yorkshire
- Country: England
- Denomination: Church of England; Methodist Church of Great Britain

History
- Status: Church
- Founded: 14th century
- Dedication: Matthew the Apostle

Architecture
- Functional status: Active
- Heritage designation: Grade II*
- Designated: 3 January 1967
- Style: Georgian
- Years built: 1798

Specifications
- Materials: Ashlar

Administration
- Province: York
- Diocese: Leeds
- Deanery: Brighouse and Elland

Clergy
- Vicar: Michelle Petch

St Matthew's Church is a local ecumenical partnership church building situated on Church Street in Rastrick, West Yorkshire, England. The present church was built in 1798 and is a Grade II* listed building. It is shared by the Church of England and the Methodist Church of Great Britain.

== History ==
The parish of Rastrick dates back to the 14th century, when the first chapel was built not long after the Black Death of 1349, as a chapel of ease served from Elland. Its first curate, John-de-Bretton, was appointed in 1363. It was a small and humble building containing "the image of Our Layde, graven in wode, the image of St Matthew unto whom it is dedicated and there stood in the street nigh to the chapel door one cross of stone, very finely graven with fretted work." The Rastrick Chapel was a free chapel in pre-Reformation England, that is to say, it was a place of worship over which the bishop had no jurisdiction. This chapel was demolished in 1602 and a new one was built in that same year.

The present Georgian-style church was completed in 1797 and consecrated on 13 or 15 April 1798. According to History, Directory & Gazetteer of the County of York (1822), "[the second chapel] was taken down and handsomely rebuilt about five and thirty years ago." A clock was installed around 1807, but was replaced by a new one in 1953, which was in turn replaced by the present clock from a church in the Diocese of Carlisle. The old vicarage was built in 1807 and enlarged in 1871, and the present vicarage was built in 1985. The church received its first stained glass windows in 1867.

The modernisation of the church interior began in 1875 under the direction of William Swinden Barber, and a renovation and a re-decoration were carried out in 1935. In the chancel, the communion table was replaced with an altar and the inscribed tablets on the east wall were replaced with the frieze depicting "Goodly Fellowship of the prophets and Glorious Company of the Apostles". The ceiling over the chancel received a painting depicting "Christ in Majesty". Most windows have Victorian stained glass. In 1907, Hugh Travis Clay (1875–1957) gifted the church a beautiful limited edition copy of the 1903 Prayer Book prepared for King Edward VII, he also dedicated the East window around 1889. On 9 November 1969, the Methodists held their first service at St Matthew's Church. A sharing agreement was signed between the Anglicans and Methodists in 1971, and since 2004, they worship together as one congregation.

== Gallery ==
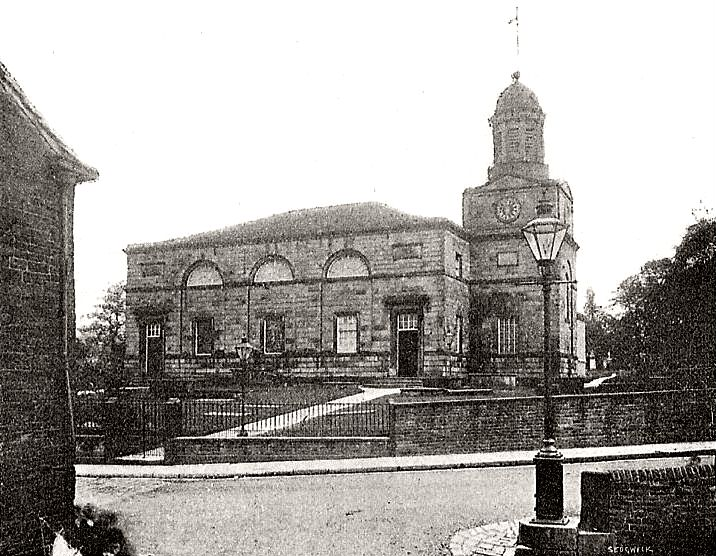
St Matthew's in 1895

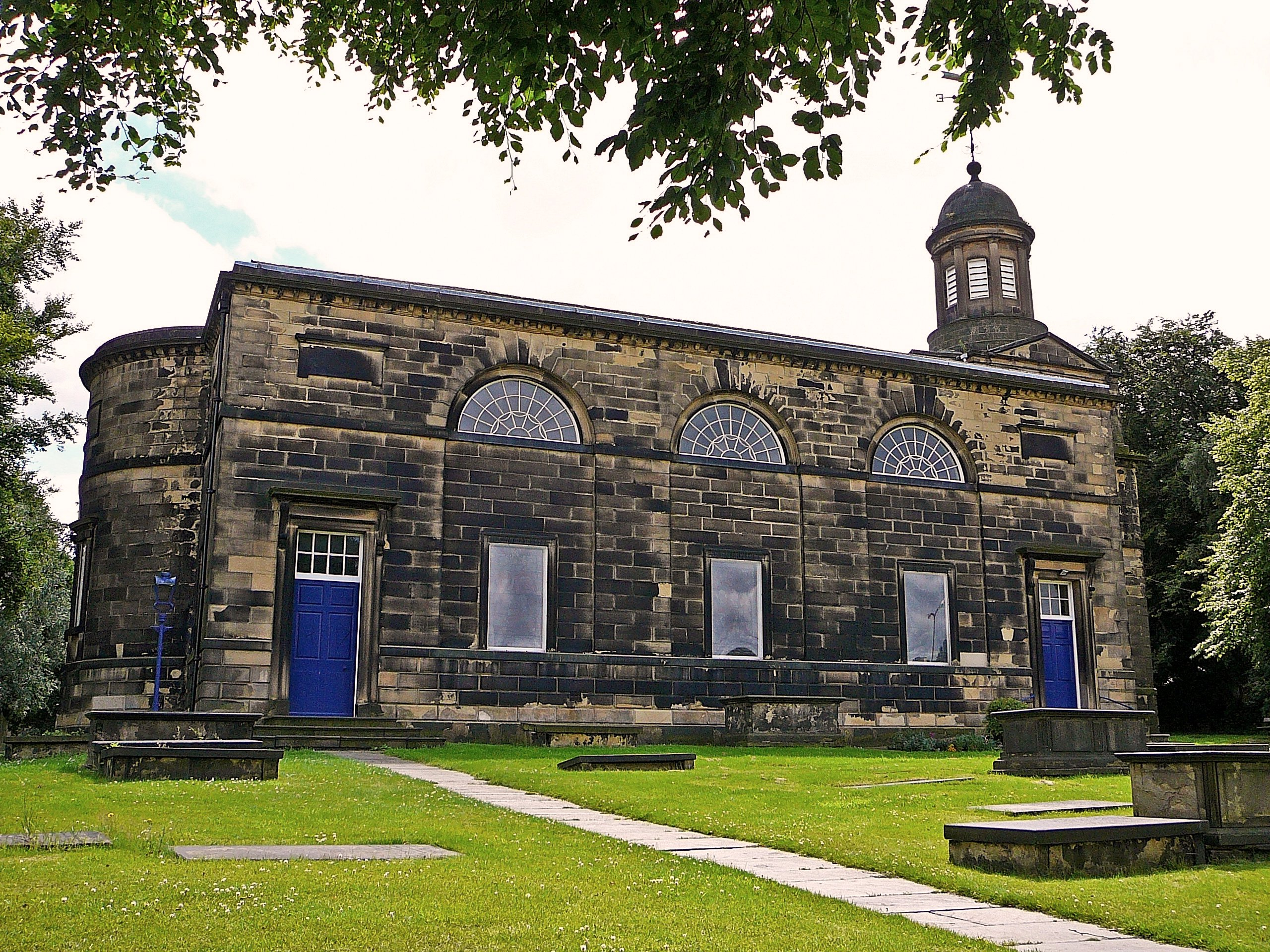
St Matthew's in 2008

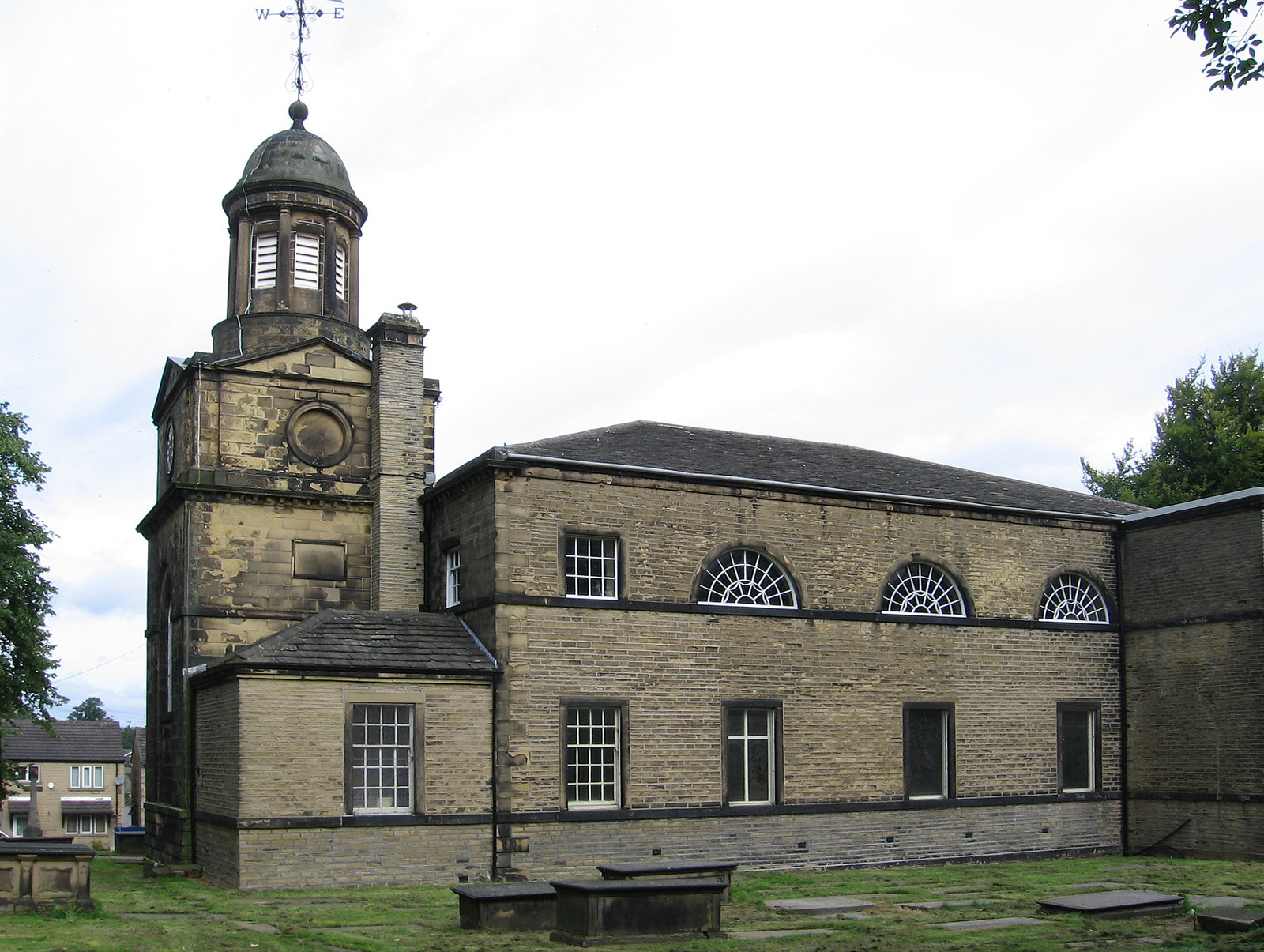
St Matthew's in 2012

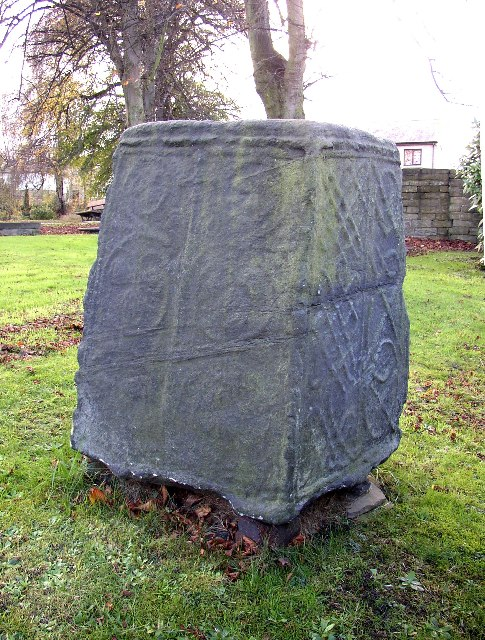
Medieval base of a Norman high cross in St Matthew's churchyard

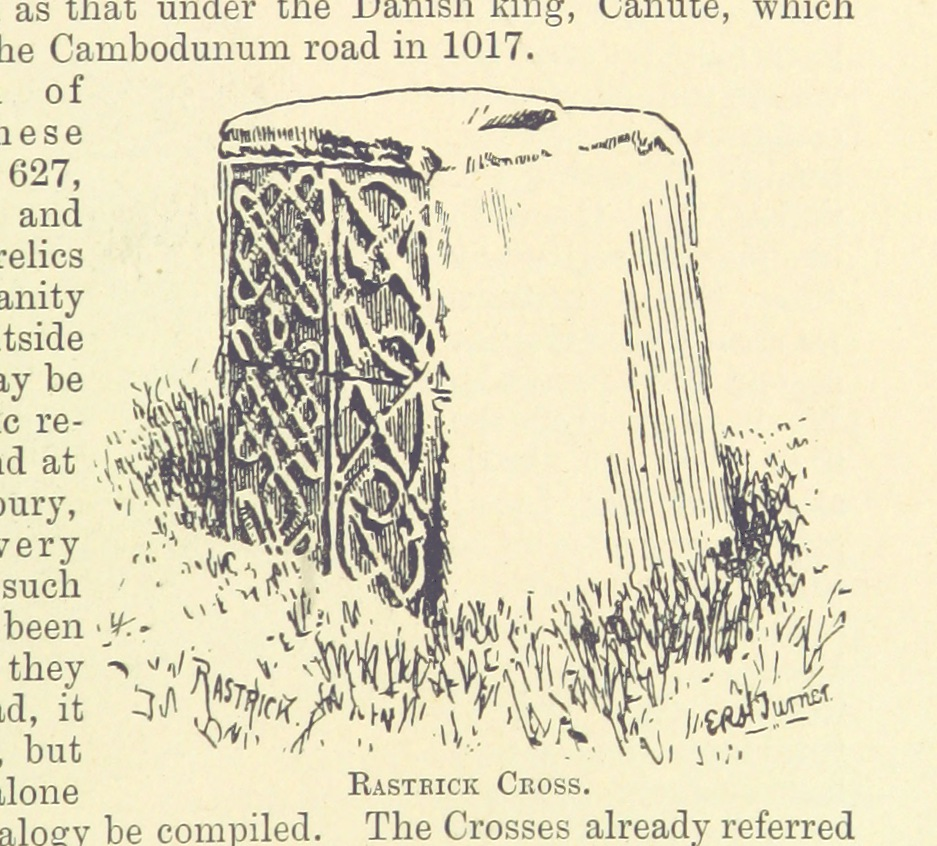
Medieval base of a Norman high cross in St Matthew's churchyard, drawing, 1893

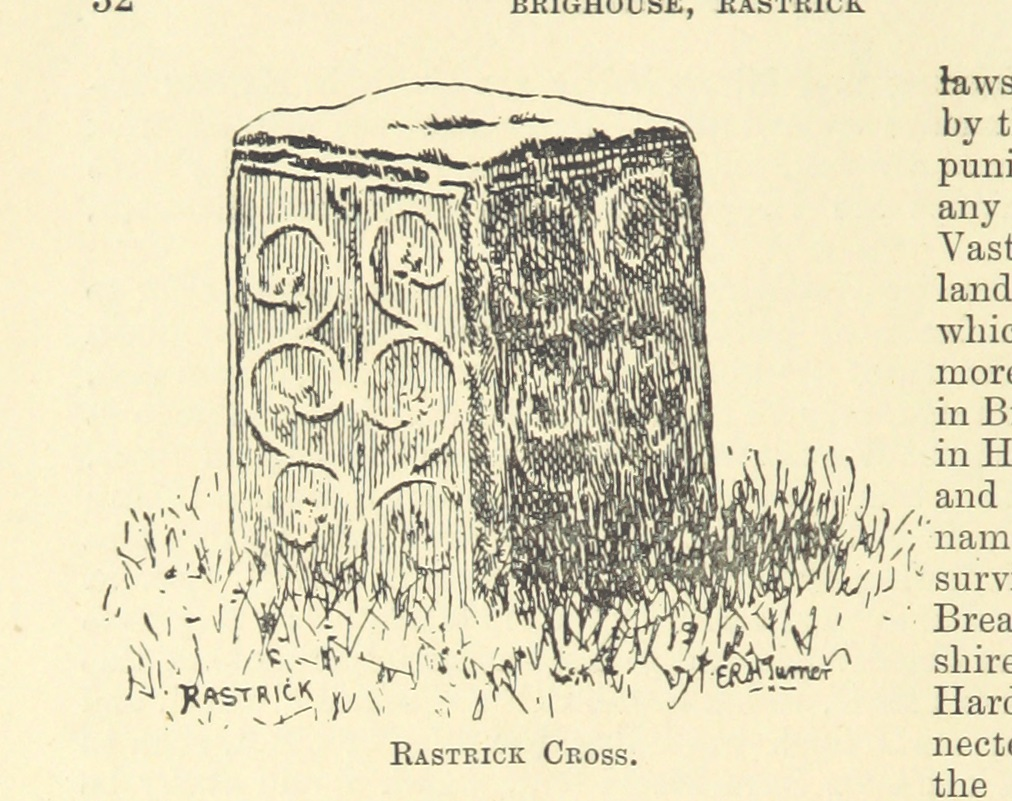
Medieval base of a Norman high cross in St Matthew's churchyard, drawing, 1893

== See also ==
- Anglican-Methodist Covenant
- English Covenant
