= Daniela Stock =

Australian scientist

Daniela Stock FAA
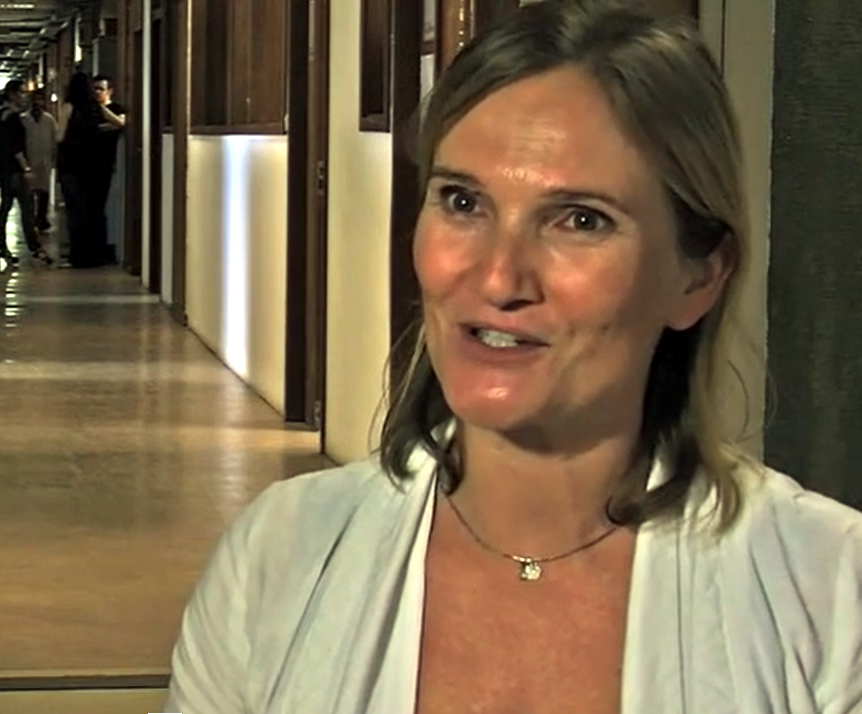
- Stock in 2012
- Occupation: Scientist

Academic background
- Education: Free University of Berlin, Max Planck Institute of Biochemistry

Academic work
- Institutions: University of New South Wales
- Main interests: Structural biology

Daniela Stock FAA is an Australian scientist at the Victor Chang Cardiac Research Institute with a conjoint position at the University of New South Wales in Sydney, Australia. She is a structural biologist whose research has provided insight into the molecular picture of rotary ATPases.

Stock was a graduate student and postdoctoral scientist at the Max Planck Institute of Biochemistry in Munich, Germany.

Stock started the Structural and Computational Biology Division at the Victor Chang Cardiac Research Institute. She was elected as a Fellow of the Australian Academy of Science in 2016.

== Career ==
Stock has led ground breaking work describing molecular rotary motors which are used in the conversion of biological energy, known as rotary ATPases. The Australian Academy of Science states that Stock has "redefined bioenergetics of the 1990s by solving the x-ray structure" of yeast mitochondrial ATPase. Stock has worked on the structure and function of ATP synthases, as the Principal Investigator on multiple NHMRC grants . She was a proponent of the development plan for use of Crystallographers using the Australian Synchrotron, to create a high-speed Macromolecular Crystallography Environment.

== Media ==
Stock was interviewed in the 2012 Challenging Ideas series from IBMCINEB, where researchers from seminars invited speakers to discuss thought-provoking ideas. She commented that grant funders have short spans, and "translational research in three years is too short, meaning long term research is more valuable", as well as "good discoveries come from basic research". Stock has also contributed to the International Union of Crystallography.

Her selection to the Australian Academy in 2016 described her as providing "pioneering work". The UNSW Campus Morning Mail "leadership line-up" described her as "one of 21 Fab Fellows".

== Select Publications ==
- Structure of 20S proteasome from yeast at 2.4 Å resolution (1997) Groll et al. Nature 386 (6624), 463
- Crystal structure of the 20S proteasome from the archaeon T. acidophilum at 3.4 A resolution (1995) Lowe J, Stock D, et al. Science 268 (5210), 533–539.
- Cryo-EM structures of the autoinhibited E. coli ATP synthase in three rotational states (2016) Sobti et al. Structural Biology and Molecular Biophysics: DOI: 10.7554/eLife.21598
- Structural and Functional Insights into the Evolution and Stress Adaptation of Type II Chaperonins Chaston et al. (2016) Structure 24, 364–374, March 1, 2016

Additional publications may be found on Research Gate.
