= Fred Harrison (author) =

British author

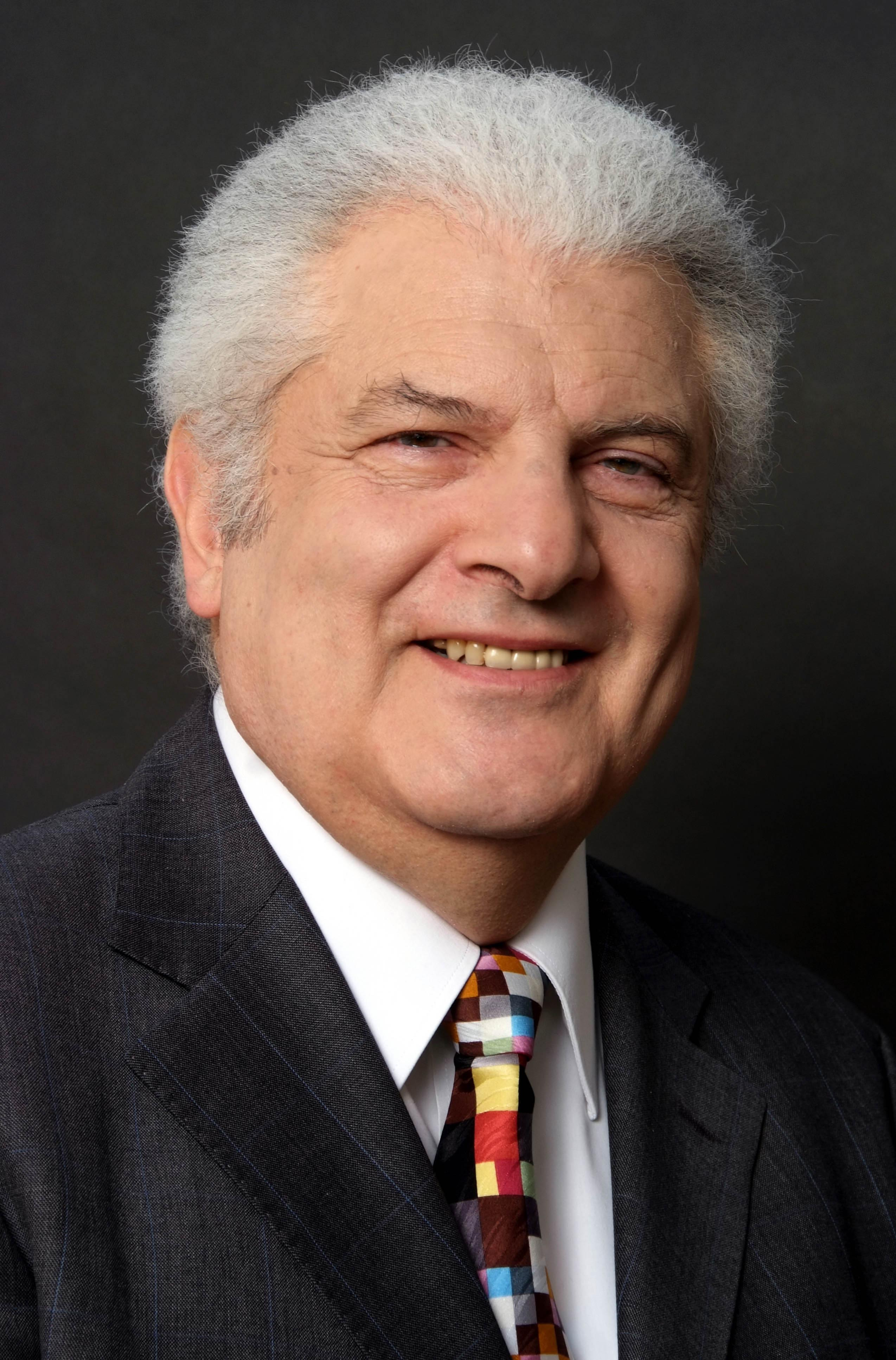
- Born: 1944 (age 81–82); British Cyprus
- Education: Ruskin College, Oxford; University College, Oxford (BA (Hons)); University of London (MSc)
- Occupations: Author, economist

Fred Harrison (born 1944) is a British author, economist, economic commentator, and corporate policy advisor, notable for his stances on land reform and belief that an overreliance on land, property, and mortgages weakens economic structures and makes companies vulnerable to economic collapse. Dirk Bezemer, a professor of economics at the University of Groningen in the Netherlands, noted that Harrison was one of the earliest to have predicted the 2008 financial crisis. In 2005 Harrison commented: "The next property market tipping point is due at end of 2007 or early 2008 ... The only way prices can be brought back to affordable levels is a slump or recession."

== Early life ==
Harrison was born in British Cyprus, and educated in England, Germany, and Singapore. After studying at Ruskin College, Oxford, he graduated from University College, Oxford, with a BA (Hons) and read for his MSc at University of London. Harrison lives in London with his wife, Rita. They have one daughter, Nina Harrison.

== Journalism career ==
Harrison's first career was in newspaper journalism, working at papers such as the Wellington Journal and Shrewsbury News, in Shropshire, England. After a stint in news agencies, he moved to The Camberley News as sub-editor, working there for a year before moving to The People newspaper, where he became chief reporter.

Most of his stories involved investigating criminal and anti-social behaviour, such as stories about speedway riders buying championship titles, but Harrison's most famous and intricate assignment was a long campaign of reports, interviews, and interaction with police to convince them to reopen the case on the serial child killings between 1963 and 1965 that were called the Moors murders.

== Economic advisor to Russia ==
With the fall of the USSR, Harrison took an opportunity to work with the Russian government in developing economic policy. He spent 10 years in Russia advising their Federal Parliament (Duma) and local authorities on property tax reform and establishment of land markets. He conducted long-range economic studies, attempting to steer economic policy towards investment in schools, science, and healthcare. He was the organizer of the Duma's Land Policy Congress and conducted several hearings and studies commissioned by a wide range of Russian authorities. In 2002 he ended his work in Russia when it became apparent that the trend of investment from resource rents was not into the ventures he had recommended, but instead into what he termed conspicuous consumption, such as buying Western real estate and football clubs. He wrote "The Silver Bullet" as a response to his disaffection for the choices of the Russian Duma on these and other issues.

== Economist, media figure, and author ==
Harrison is inspired by the writings of the American political economist Henry George.

After his sojourn in Russia, Harrison returned to his work in England. He had already become the Research Director of the Land Research Trust, London, in 1998 and worked as a corporate business advisor, as well as giving lectures on property and tax policy.

His main focus in both writing and lecturing has been to warn of what he considers to be the dangers of using land and real estate as the primary drivers of economic growth. His work links economic policy to social reform. Harrison's macro-economic analysis is based on the theory that business conforms to a pattern of 18-year cycles, determined by the unique characteristics of the land market. According to Harrison, economists erroneously "assume that the health of the property market depends upon the condition of the rest of the economy. In fact ... property is the key factor that shapes the business cycle, not the other way around."

=== Predicting the 2007-08 crash ===
Harrison says he warned Gordon Brown as far back as 1997 that the UK economy would hit the peak of the cycle in 2007 – and turn down into a depression in 2010. In 2005 he commented: "The next property market tipping point is due at end of 2007 or early 2008 ... The only way prices can be brought back to affordable levels is a slump or recession.”

In 2009, Dirk Bezemer, a professor of economics at the University of Groningen in the Netherlands, noted that Harrison was one of the earliest to have predicted the 2008 financial crisis.

== In the media ==
Harrison has been very active in the UK media, with dozens of newspaper and magazine articles, and many TV and radio interviews. As an example, in 2005 there was an almost unanimous view that the rise in house prices would moderate and that any talk of a "housing bubble" was both premature and indicated a false understanding of debt economics.

Harrison argued that building more properties is not the solution because speculative demand will always outstrip supply in the winner's curse stage of the cycle: "In the land market, a rise in demand cannot result in an offsetting increase in supply in places where people want to live and work. So prices are driven to dizzying heights by speculators, who outbid each other with offers for tracts that cannot yield an economic return. The market stalls and the house of cards comes crashing down.

In 2015, Harrison published the first of a trilogy of Handbooks on Humanity. He integrated cultural studies with economic theory to test hypotheses that seek to explain why governments persist with sub-optimal fiscal policies. Harrison concluded that Western ("neo-liberal") culture had been shaped by rent-seeking to deliver sub-optimum outcomes through tax policies that have the permanent effect of mal-distributing income and retarding economic growth.

== Bibliography ==
- Rent Unmasked, Shepheard-Walwyn, ISBN 9780856835117, July 2016.
- As Evil Does: Anatomy of a Killing Cult, London: Geophilos, 2015. ISBN 978-0993339806
- The Traumatised Society: How to Outlaw Cheating and Save our Civilisation, London: Shepheard-Walwyn. ISBN 978-0-85683-287-1
- The Inquest (2010)
- The Silver Bullet
- Ricardo’s Law: House Prices & the Great Tax Clawback Scam, London: Shepheard-Walwyn. ISBN 978-0-85683-241-3
- Wheels of Fortune: Self-funding Infrastructure and the Free Market Case for a Land Tax
- Boom Bust: House Prices, Banking and the Depression of 2010, London: Shepheard-Walwyn. ISBN 978-0-85683-254-3
- The Losses of Nations
- Metaman & the Sacred Money Scam
- The Chaos Makers (with Prof. F.J. Jones)
- Land-rent Dynamics and the Sustainable Society (with Galina Titova), Cambridge, MA: Lincoln Institute of Land Policy Working Paper
- Land & Taxation (with Dr. Nicolaus Tideman et al.) London: Shepheard-Walwyn. ISBN 978-0-85683-153-9
- The Corruption of Economics (with Mason Gaffney and Dr. K. Feder) London: Shepheard-Walwyn. ISBN 978-0-85683-244-4
- A Philosophy for a Fair Society (with Michael Hudson et al.) London: Shepheard-Walwyn. ISBN 978-0-85683-159-1
- The Power in the Land, New York: Universe Books/Canada: Prentice Hall, London: Shepheard-Walwyn. ISBN 978-0-85683-109-6
- The Predator Culture, London: Shepheard-Walwyn. ISBN 978-0-85683-273-4
- Brady & Hindley: Genesis of the Moors Murders, Bath: Ashgrove Press
- Critics of Henry George, Rutherford: Fairleigh Dickinson UP
- #WeAreRent Book 1: Capitalism, Cannibalism and why we must outlaw Free Riding: Land Research Trust
