= Scottish Land Restoration League =

Defunct political party of Scotland

- Founded: 1884
- Dissolved: 1904
- Merged into: Scottish Labour Party
- Ideology: Georgism

The Scottish Land Restoration League was a Georgist political party.

== History ==
In the 1880s, enclosure was still in process in the Scottish Highlands, and resistance to it often received support from radicals around Britain and Ireland. Branches of the Irish Land League, founded in 1879 to campaign against landlordism, had been set up in Scotland, but the League was wound up in 1883.

In 1884, Henry George toured the Highlands and major cities of Scotland on the invitation of the English Land Reform Union. Touring with Edward McHugh, he spoke on his theory of land reform. The tour culminated with a large meeting Glasgow on 18 February 1884, chaired by John Murdoch. Almost 2,000 people signed up, on the initiative of Richard McGhee, to form an organisation to propagate and campaign for George's ideas. This group was formed as the "Scottish Land Restoration League". William Forsyth became its first President, and McHugh its first Secretary. The group immediately spread to other cities around the nation. Among those who joined were many former members of the Land League.

A second tour by George at the end of 1884 attracted less attention, and McHugh was accused of mismanaging its publicity. Already, the League was in decline, and when it stood five candidates in the 1885 general election, they received a total of only 2,359 votes. McGhee soon assumed the Presidency of the League.

In 1888, some members, around Keir Hardie, formed the Scottish Labour Party, and ceased to work with the League. McGhee left his post in 1889, to become honorary President of the National Union of Dock Labourers. Alexander Bowman was elected as the League's new President the following year. The League merged with the Henry George Institute and the South Side Single Tax Association and renamed itself the Scottish Land Restoration Federation. Two further organisations were born of the demise of the League—the Scottish Land Restoration Union and the Scottish League for the Taxation of Land Values. Bowman left this post in 1892, but the organisation continued, with a much lower profile, renaming itself as the Scottish Single Tax League. In 1904, it was again renamed, as the Scottish League for the Taxation of Land Values.

== Election results ==
=== 1885 UK general election ===
Map showing seats in Glasgow in 1885. Marked in Green are seats contested by the League. Of the five seats contested by the League, four were in Glasgow.

Constituency	Candidate	Votes	Percentage	Position
Glasgow Blackfriars and Hutchesontown	Shaw Maxwell	1,156	14.4	3
Glasgow Bridgeton	William Forsyth	978	12.1	3
Partick	John Murdoch	74	1.0	3
Glasgow Tradeston	Wallace McGuffin Greaves	86	1.1	3
Greenock	John Morrison Davidson	65	1.1	3

== See also ==
- Highland Land League
