= Henry George Foundation of Great Britain =

British economics think tank

The Henry George Foundation (of Great Britain Ltd)
- Founded: 1907
- Type: incorporated charity registered in England and Wales (company limited by guarantee no. 00956714, charity no. 259194)
- Purpose: economic justice
- Location: London, United Kingdom
- Product: Land&Liberty
- Method: think tank
- Key people: David Triggs (Executive Chairman)
- Revenue: membership & supporters
- Website: http://www.henrygeorgefoundation.org

The Henry George Foundation is an independent UK economic and social justice think tank and public education group concerned with "the development of sound relationships between the citizen, our communities (from the local to the global) and our shared natural and common resources". The Henry George Foundation describes itself as "active on three broad fronts: research, education, and advocacy". The Foundation takes its name from Henry George, the 19th century economist and proponent of the taxation of land values.

== Activities ==
The Henry George Foundation is the publisher of the magazine Land&Liberty. The Foundation holds educational courses and organises conferences and other public events focussing on tax reform issues. It has sponsored academic research, published extensively, and advised legislators, civil servants and NGOs on land and tax reform matters.

== History ==
The Henry George Foundation is the present-day successor of a series of organisations and names that hails back to the United Committee for the Taxation of Land Values. The UCTLV was constituted on 23 March 1907 (a previous 'United Committee' had been formed in 1887) as a coordinating body for a number of organisations with the shared object of promoting the taxation of land values. These organisations continued to exist in parallel with the United Committee, and included a number of regional leagues for the taxation of land values and also the national bodies the English League for the Taxation of Land Values and the Scottish League for the Taxation of Land Values.

In 1969 (the regional leagues mostly having folded, with only the Scottish League in continuing existence) the United Committee launched ESSRA (Economic and Social Science Research Association), a registered charity, and transferred much of its activity to it. In 1991 the United Committee changed its name to the Centre for Incentive Taxation. Five years later, in 1996, all activities and assets of the various associated companies and other entities and initiatives (including publication of Land and Liberty) were re-gathered under the umbrella of the charitable company ESSRA, or were terminated, and the holding bodies dissolved. ESSRA then changed its name to The Henry George Foundation of Great Britain, Ltd.
