= Bradby =

Bradby is a surname. Notable people with the surname include:

- John Bradby Blake (1745–1773), English botanist who collected seeds in China
- Anne Barbara Bradby (married name: Anne Ridler) OBE (1912–2001), British poet and Faber and Faber editor
- Barbara Bradby (1873–1961), English social historian, researcher and writer
- David Bradby (1942–2011), British drama and theatre academic
- Edward Bradby (1827–1893), classicist, House Master at Harrow, Headmaster of Haileybury College
- Edward Bradby (cricketer) (1866–1947), English first-class cricketer and solicitor
- G. F. Bradby (1863–1947), schoolmaster at Rugby School, with a wide-ranging literary career
- Henry Bradby (1868–1947), English first-class cricketer, schoolmaster and poet
- James Bradby (1929–1968), American law enforcement officer
- Tom Bradby (born 1967), British journalist and novelist, presenter of the ITV News at Ten

== See also ==
- The Agenda with Tom Bradby, political discussion programme on British television network ITV
- Bradby Shield Encounter, the annual school rugby competition between Royal College and Trinity College in Sri Lanka
