= Swing Riots =

1830 uprisings by English agricultural workers

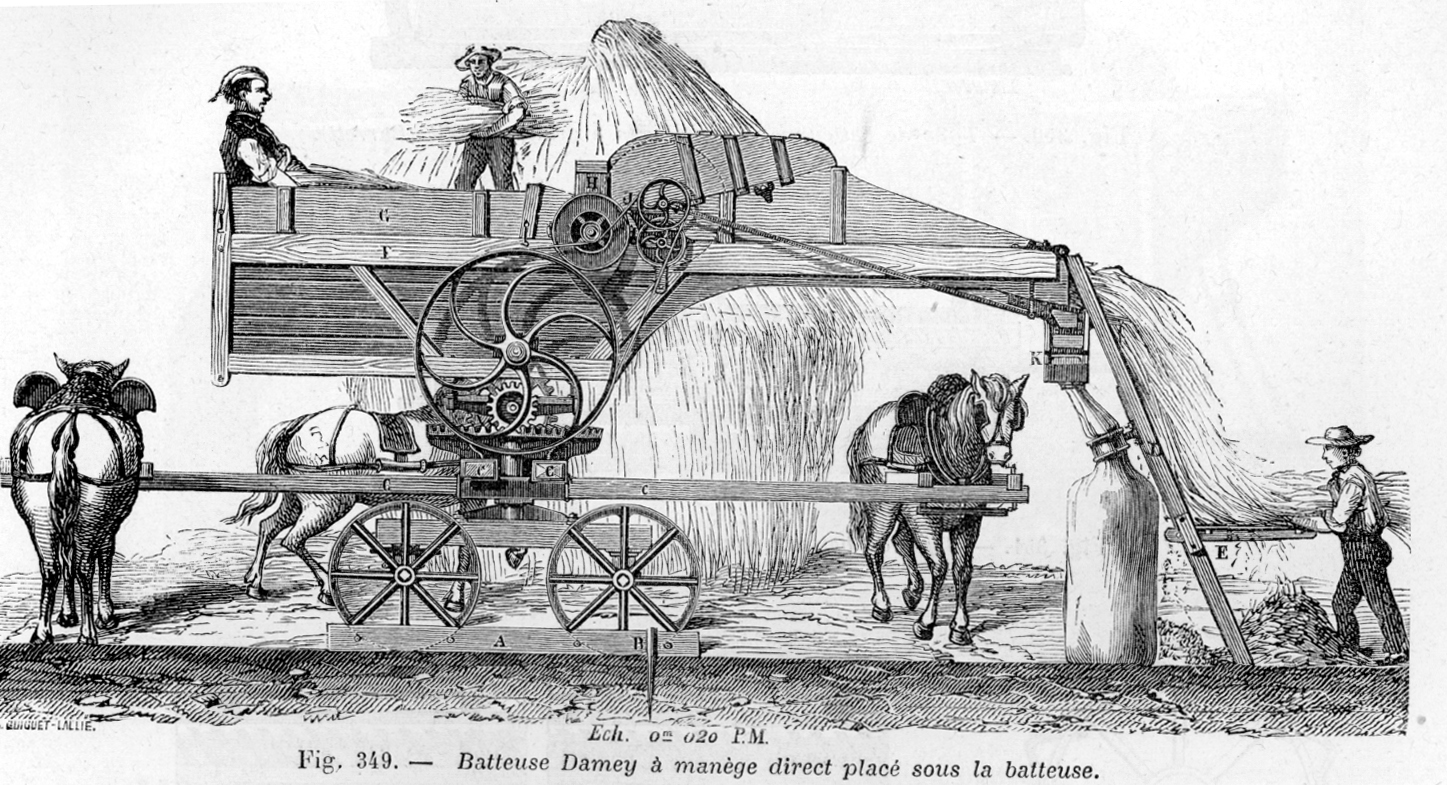
Horse-powered threshing machine

The Swing Riots were a widespread set of uprisings in 1830 by agricultural workers across Southern England and Eastern England in protest of agricultural mechanisation and harsh working conditions. The riots began with the destruction of threshing machines in the Elham Valley area of East Kent in the summer of 1830 and by early December had spread through the whole of southern England and East Anglia. It was to be the largest movement of social unrest in 19th-century England.

As well as attacking the popularly-hated threshing machines, which displaced workers, the protesters rioted over low wages and required tithes by destroying workhouses and tithe barns associated with their oppression. They also burned ricks and maimed cows.

The rioters directed their anger at the three targets identified as causing their misery: the tithe system, requiring payments to support the established Anglican Church; the Poor Law guardians, who were thought to abuse their power over the poor; and the rich tenant farmers, who had been progressively lowering workers' wages and introduced agricultural machinery. If captured, the protesters faced charges of arson, robbery, riot, machine-breaking and assault. Those convicted faced imprisonment, transportation and possibly execution.

The Swing Riots had many immediate causes. The historian J. F. C. Harrison believed that they were overwhelmingly the result of the progressive impoverishment and dispossession of the English agricultural workforce over the previous fifty years leading up to 1830. In Parliament, Lord Carnarvon had said that the English labourers were reduced to a plight more abject than that of any race in Europe, with their employers no longer able to feed and employ them. A 2020 study found that the presence of threshing machines caused greater rioting and that the severity of the riots was lowest in areas with abundant employment alternatives and the highest in areas with few alternative employment opportunities.

== Name and etymology ==
The name "Swing Riots" was derived from Captain Swing, the name attributed to the fictitious, mythical figurehead of the movement. The name was often used to sign threatening letters sent to farmers, magistrates, parsons and others. These were first mentioned by The Times on 21 October 1830.

According to a Kent journalist, 'Swing' was a reference to the swinging stick of the flail used in hand threshing.

== Background ==
=== Enclosure ===
Early 19th-century England was almost unique among major nations in having no class of landed smallholding peasantry. The inclosure acts of rural England contributed to the plight of rural farmworkers. Between 1770 and 1830, about 6 million acres (24,000 km^{2}) of common land were enclosed. The common land had been used for centuries by the poor of the countryside to graze their animals and grow their own produce. The land was now divided up among the large local landowners, leaving the landless farmworkers solely dependent upon working for their richer neighbours for a cash wage. That may have offered a tolerable living during the boom years of the Napoleonic Era, when labour had been in short supply and corn prices high, the return of peace in 1815 resulted in plummeting grain prices and an oversupply of labour. According to the social historians John and Barbara Hammond, enclosure was fatal to three classes: the small farmer, the cottager and the squatter. Before enclosure, the cottager was a labourer with land; after enclosure, he was a labourer without land.

In contrast to the Hammonds' 1911 analysis of the events, the historian G. E. Mingay noted that when the Swing Riots broke out in 1830, the heavily-enclosed Midlands remained almost entirely quiet, but the riots were concentrated in the southern and south-eastern counties, which were little affected by enclosure. Some historians have posited that the reason was that in the West Midlands, for example, the rapid expansion of the Potteries and the coal and iron industries provided an alternative range of employment to agricultural workers.

Critically, J. D. Chambers and G. E. Mingay suggested that the Hammonds exaggerated the costs of change, but enclosure really meant more food for the growing population; more land under cultivation and, on the balance, more employment in the countryside. The modern historians of the riots, Eric Hobsbawm and George Rudé, cited only three of a total of 1,475 incidents as being directly caused by enclosure. Since the late 20th century, those contentions have been challenged by a new class of recent historians. Enclosure has been seen by some as causing the destruction of the traditional peasant way of life, however miserable:

"Enclosure dissipated the haze which surrounded rural poverty and left it nakedly visible as propertyless labour"

— Hobsbawm/Rude. Captain Swing p. 16

Landless peasants could no longer maintain an economic independence and so had to become labourers. Surplus peasant labour moved into the towns to become industrial workers.

=== Precarious employment ===
In the 1780s, workers would be employed at annual hiring fairs, or ‘mops’, to serve for the whole year. During that period, the worker would receive payment in kind and in cash from his employer, would often work at his side, and would commonly share meals at the employer's table. As time passed, the gulf between farmer and employee widened. Workers were hired on stricter cash-only contracts, which ran for increasingly shorter periods. First, monthly terms became the norm. Later, contracts were offered for as little as a week. Between 1750 and 1850, farm labourers faced the loss of their land, the transformation of their contracts and the sharp deterioration of their economic situations. By the time of the 1830 riots, they had retained very little of their former status except the right to parish relief, under the Old Poor Law system.

Additionally, there was an influx of Irish farm labourers in 1829, who had come to seek agricultural work which contributed to reduced employment opportunities for other farming communities. Irish labourers would find themselves being threatened from the beginning of the riots. Local newspapers of the time reported that rioting occurred in Lincolnshire and Northamptonshire over the employment of Irish labourers as late as 11 August 1832.

=== Poor Laws ===
Historically, the monasteries had taken responsibility for the impotent poor, but after their dissolution in 1536 to 1539, responsibility passed to the parishes. the Act of Settlement in 1662 had confined relief strictly to those who were natives of the parish. The poor law system charged a Parish Rate to landowners and tenants, which was used to provide relief payments to settled residents of the parish who were ill or out of work. The payments were minimal, and at times, degrading conditions were required for their receipt. As more and more people became dependent on parish relief, ratepayers rebelled ever more loudly against the costs, and lower and lower levels of relief were offered. Three "one-gallon" bread loaves a week were considered necessary for a man in Berkshire in 1795. However provision had fallen to just two similarly-sized loaves being provided in 1817 Wiltshire. The way in which poor law funds were disbursed led to a further reduction in agricultural wages since farmers would pay their workers as little as possible in the knowledge that the parish fund would top up wages to a basic subsistence level (see Speenhamland system).

=== Tithe System ===
To that mixture was added the burden of the church tithe. This was the church's right to a tenth of the parish harvest. The tithe-owner could voluntarily reduce the financial burden on the parish either by allowing the parish to keep more of their share of the harvest. Or the tithe-owner could, again voluntarily, commute the tithe payments to a rental charge. The rioters had demanded that tithes should be reduced, but this demand was refused by many of the tithe-owners. (Note: Tithe Act 1836 (6 & 7 Will. 4. c. 71) made it compulsory for tithe payments to be commutated to a rent charge instead.)

=== Industrialisation ===
Separating the grain seed from the stalk and husks, threshing, was traditionally done manually via flails and occupied up to a quarter of the agricultural workforce. In the late 18th century, the threshing machine was invented and spread swiftly among the farming community, threatening the livelihoods of hundreds of thousands of farm-workers. The terrible harvests of 1828 and 1829 proved to be the last straw, and farm labourers faced the approaching winter of 1830 with dread.

== Riots ==
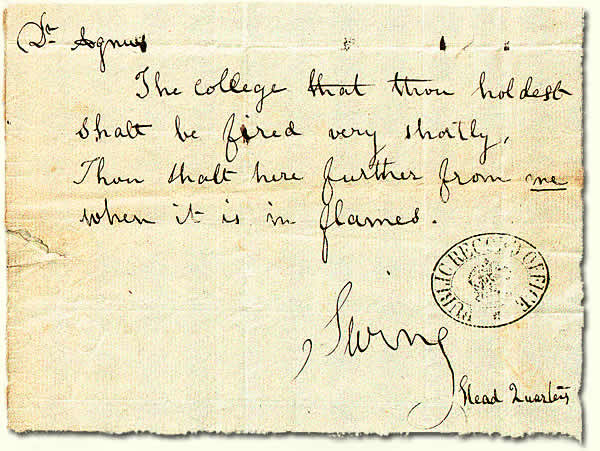
A letter threatening to burn Corpus Christi College, Cambridge, sent in 1830 and signed "Swing".

The riots, being largely improvised and spontaneous in nature, started in Kent with rioters smashing threshing machines and threatening the farmers who owned them. The first threshing machine to be destroyed was during Saturday night, 28 August 1830 at Lower Hardres. By the third week of October, more than 100 threshing machines had been destroyed in East Kent. The riots spread rapidly and systematically, following pre-existing road networks, through the southern counties of Surrey, Sussex, Middlesex and Hampshire before they spread north into the Home Counties, the Midlands and East Anglia. Originally, the disturbances were thought to be mainly a southern and East Anglian phenomenon, but subsequent research has revealed just how widespread Swing riots really were, with almost every county south of the Scottish border involved.

More recently 'The Swing Project' has supported this analysis and suggested that the southern counties of England were not the epicentre of the disturbance; as their project had identified a lot more incidents in the eastern counties.

=== Tactics ===
The tactics varied from county to county, but typically, threatening letters, often signed by Captain Swing, would be sent to magistrates, parsons, wealthy farmers or Poor Law guardians in the area. The letters would call for a rise in wages, a cut in the tithe payments and the destruction of threshing machines, or people would take matters into their own hands. If the warnings were not heeded local farm workers would gather, often in groups of 200 to 400, and would threaten the local oligarchs with dire consequences if their demands were not met. Threshing machines would be broken, workhouses and tithe barns would be attacked and the rioters would then disperse or move on to the next village. The buildings containing the engines that powered the threshing machines were also a target of the rioters and many gin gangs, also known as horse engine houses or wheelhouses, were destroyed, particularly in south−eastern England. There are also recorded instances of carriages being held up and their occupants robbed.

Other actions included incendiary attacks on farms, barns and hayricks in the dead of night, when it was easier to avoid detection. Although many of the actions of the rioters, such as arson, were conducted in secret at night, meetings with farmers and overseers about the grievances were conducted in daylight.

Despite the prevalence of the slogan "Bread or Blood", only one person is recorded as having been killed during the riots, which was one of the rioters by the action of a soldier or farmer. The rioters' only intent was to damage property. Similar patterns of disturbances and their rapid spread across the country were often blamed on agitators or on "agents" sent from France, where the revolution of July 1830 had broken out a month before the Swing Riots had begun in Kent.

Despite all of the different tactics used by the agricultural workers during the unrest, their principal aims were simply to attain a minimum living wage and to end rural unemployment.

A 2021 study that examined how information and diffusion shaped the riots found "that information about the riots traveled through personal and trade networks but not through transport or mass media networks. This information was not about repression, and local organizers played an important role in the diffusion of the riots".

== Aftermath ==
=== Trials ===
The authorities felt severely threatened by the riots and responded with harsh punitive measures. Nearly 2,000 protesters were brought to trial in 1830–1831; 252 were sentenced to death (though only 19 were actually hanged), 644 were imprisoned and 481 were transported to penal colonies in Australia. Not all rioters were farm workers since the list of those punished included rural artisans, shoemakers, carpenters, wheelwrights, blacksmiths and cobblers. One of those hanged was reported to have been charged only because he had knocked the hat off the head of a member of the Baring banking family. Many of the protesters who were transported had their sentences remitted in 1835.

=== Social, economic and political reform ===
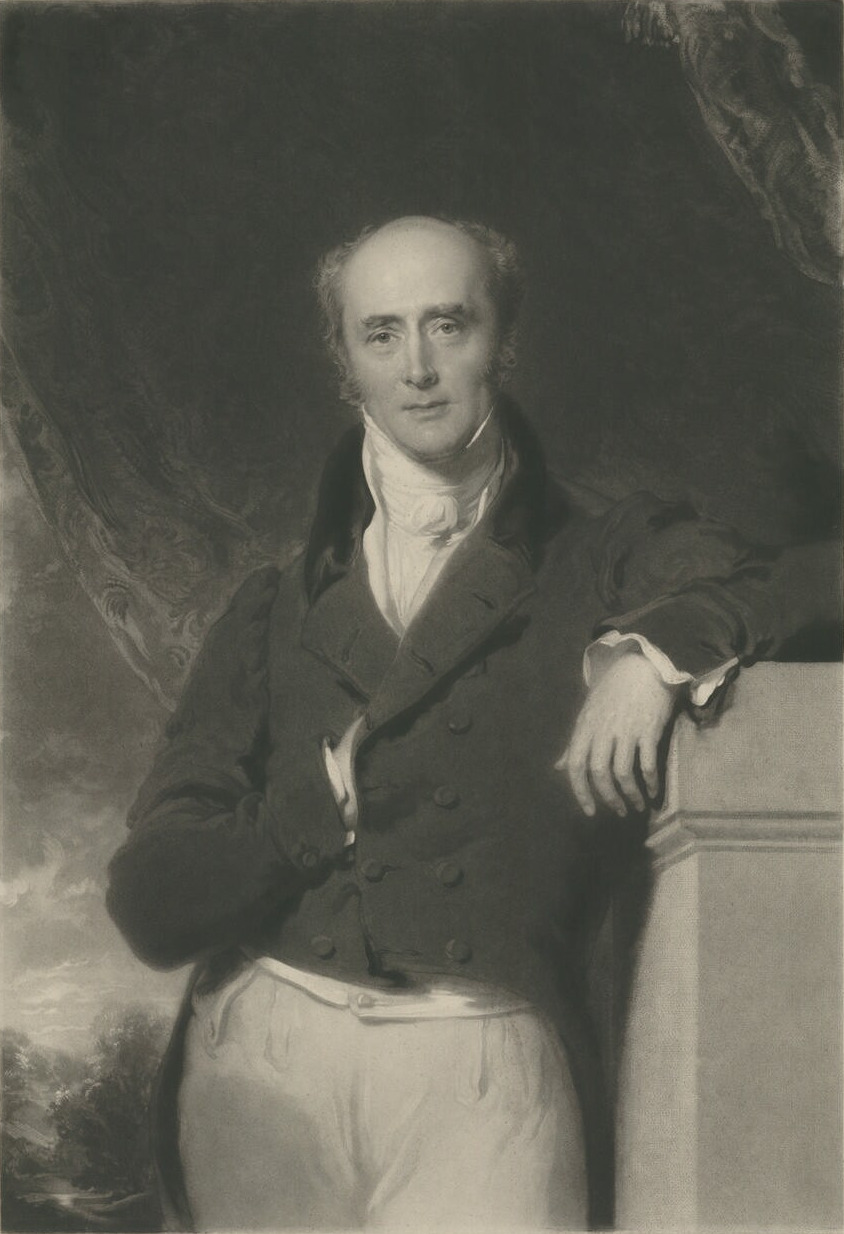
Charles Grey, 2nd Earl Grey, Prime Minister 1830–1834

Eventually, the farmers agreed to raise wages, and the parsons and some landlords reduced the tithes and rents. However, many farmers reneged on the agreements, and the unrest increased.

Many people advocated political reform as the only solution to the unrest, one of them being the radical politician and writer William Cobbett. The authorities had received many requests to prosecute him for the speeches that he had made in defence of the rural labourer, but it was for his articles in the Political Register that he was eventually charged with seditious libel. He wrote an article, The Rural War, about the Swing Riots. He blamed those in society who lived off unearned income at the expense of hard-working agricultural labourers; his solution was parliamentary reform. During his trial in July 1831 at the Guildhall, he subpoenaed six members of the cabinet, including the prime minister. Cobbett defended himself by going on the attack. He tried to ask the government ministers awkward questions supporting his case, but they were disallowed by the Lord Chief Justice. However, he was able to discredit the prosecution's case, and at great embarrassment to the government, he was acquitted.

A major concern was that the Swing Riots could spark a larger revolt. That was reinforced by the 29 July 1830 revolution in France, which overthrew Charles X, and the independence of Belgium from the Netherlands later in 1830. The support for parliamentary reform was on party lines, with the Tories against reform and the Whigs having proposed changes well before the Swing riots. The farm labourers who were involved in the disturbances did not have a vote, but it is probable that the largely landowning classes, who could vote, were influenced by the Swing Riots to support reform.

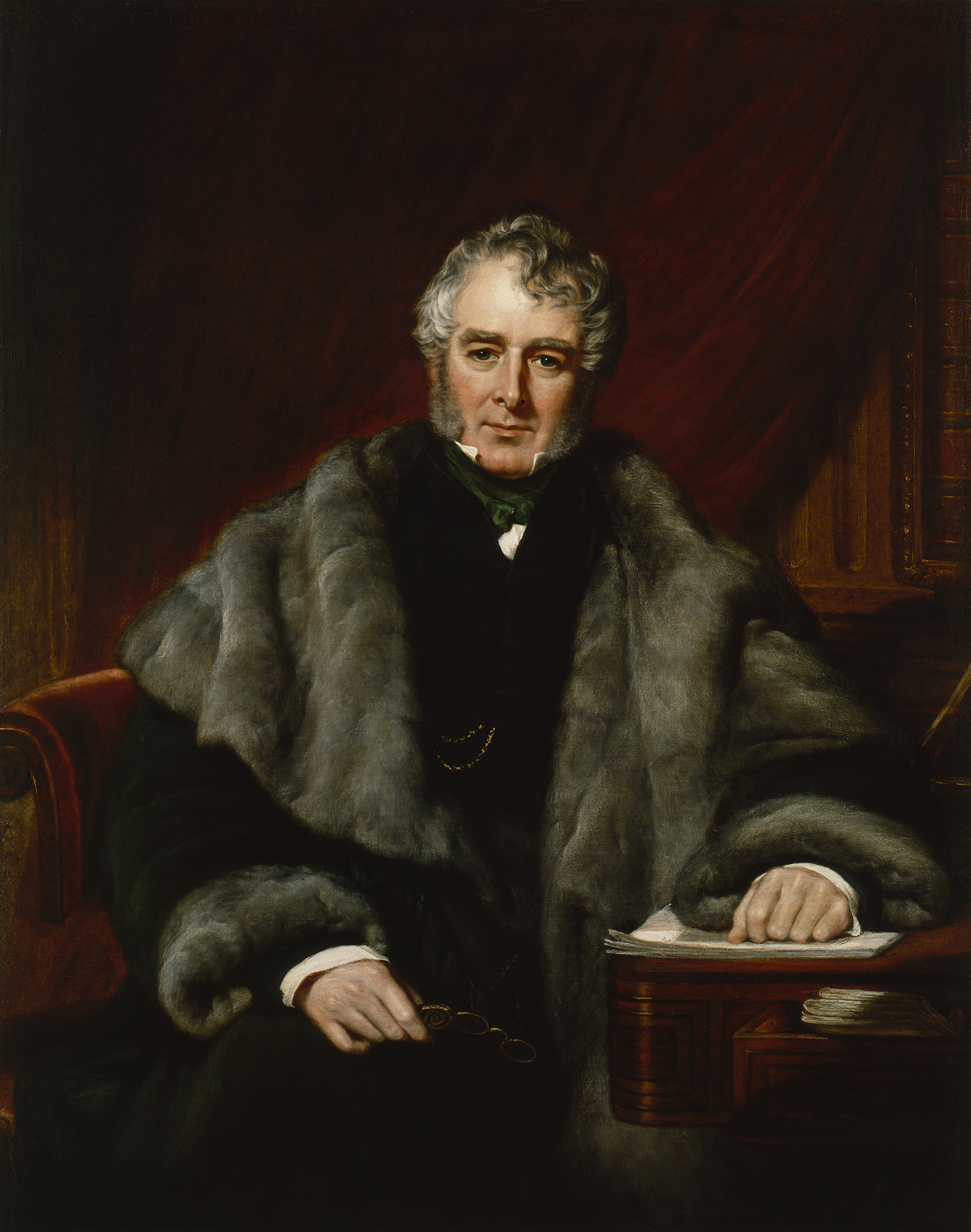
Portrait of Lord Melbourne by John Partridge. Lord Melbourne - Home Secretary of Earl Grey's Whig government

Earl Grey, during a House of Lords debate in November 1830, suggested the best way to reduce the violence was to introduce reform of the House of Commons. The Tory Prime Minister, the Duke of Wellington, replied that the existing constitution was so perfect that he could not imagine any possible alternative that would be an improvement. When that was reported, a mob attacked Wellington's home in London. The unrest had been confined to Kent, but during the following two weeks of November, it escalated massively by crossing East and West Sussex into Hampshire, with Swing letters appearing in other nearby counties.

On 15 November 1830, Wellington's government was defeated by a vote in the House of Commons. Two days later, Earl Grey was asked to form a Whig government. Grey assigned a cabinet committee to produce a plan for parliamentary reform. Lord Melbourne became Home Secretary in the new government. He blamed local magistrates for being too lenient, and the government appointed a Special Commission of three judges to try rioters in the counties of Berkshire, Buckinghamshire, Dorset, Wiltshire and Hampshire.

==== Acts of Parliament ====
The riots were a major influence on the Whig government. They added to the strong social, political and agricultural unrest throughout Britain in the 1830s, encouraging a wider demand for political reform, culminating in the introduction of the Great Reform Act 1832. The act was the first of several reforms that over the course of a century transformed the British political system from one based on privilege and corruption to one based on universal suffrage and the secret ballot. In domestic elections before the Great Reform Act 1832, only about three per cent of the English population could vote. Most constituencies had been founded in the Middle Ages and so the newly-industrial northern England had virtually no representation. Those who could vote were mainly the large landowners and wealthy commoners.

The Great Reform Act 1832 was followed by the Poor Law Amendment Act 1834, ending "outdoor relief" in cash or kind and setting up purposefully unwholesome workhouses covering larger areas across the country to which the poor had to work in if they wanted help.

== See also ==
- British Agricultural Revolution
- Ely and Littleport riots of 1816
- Luddite
- Rebecca Riots
- Tolpuddle Martyrs
- William Winterbourne
