= Letitia Chitty =

English engineer

- Born: 15 July 1897; Kensington, London, England
- Died: 29 September 1982 (aged 85)
- Education: Newnham College, Cambridge
- Occupation: Engineer
- Known for: Aeronautics

Letitia Chitty (15 July 1897 – 29 September 1982) was an English engineer who became a respected structural analytical engineer, achieving several firsts for women engineers, including becoming the first female fellow of the Royal Aeronautical Society and the second female recipient of the Telford Medal.

== Early life ==
Born at 51 Campden House Road, Kensington, London, she was the eldest of four sisters and one brother. Her father Herbert Chitty (1863–1949) was a barrister and (from 1907) bursar of Winchester College. Her mother was Mabel Agatha (née Bradby; 1865–1944). Her paternal grandfather was the judge Sir Joseph William Chitty and her maternal grandfather was Canon Edward Henry Bradby, the headmaster of Haileybury College.

Her Bradby relatives included uncle G. F. Bradby, author of The Lanchester Tradition (1919), and aunt Barbara Bradby joint author of The Village Labourer (1911). Cousins included the poet Anne Ridler.

Her godmother was Violet Jex-Blake, niece of the suffragist and first female medical graduate in the UK, Sophia Jex-Blake.

== Education ==
Chitty was privately educated between 1903 and 1916, latterly at Kensington High School. She entered Newnham College, Cambridge in 1916, taking the first part of the Tripos. During World War I, as part of a British programme to identify the best female mathematics graduates and current students, she was selected for war work with Alfred Pippard at the Admiralty Air Department at age 19. After the war she returned to her studies, changed subject to engineering, and graduated with a titular degree from Newnham College with first class honours in the Mechanical Sciences Tripos, 1921, the first woman to do so.

== Early career ==
Her early career focused on analysing the stresses of airframes, airships and civil engineering structures, initially with the Admiralty Air Department and then, after graduating, at the Air Ministry with Richard Southwell and Alfred Pippard.

=== Work with Tarrant Tabor ===
At the end of the war, W. G. Tarrant, who was previously a timber merchant, built a massive bomber: the Tarrant Tabor. The original biplane design had to be altered to triplane to accommodate more engines, and the Admiralty Air Department was asked to check its structural strength. Chitty was given this task.

In her own words:

"Mr. Tarrant was an inspired timber merchant who dreamed of a super-Camel. It hadn't a chance. It was too big, too heavy - that wasn't its fault, but Grade A spruce had by now run out and it had to be built of American white wood (tulip). In my language, 3,500 instead of 5,500 lb/sq in."

The plane pitched over during its first take-off at the Royal Aircraft Establishment, Farnborough on 26 May 1919, killing both pilots and seriously injuring the other six people on board.

== Later career ==
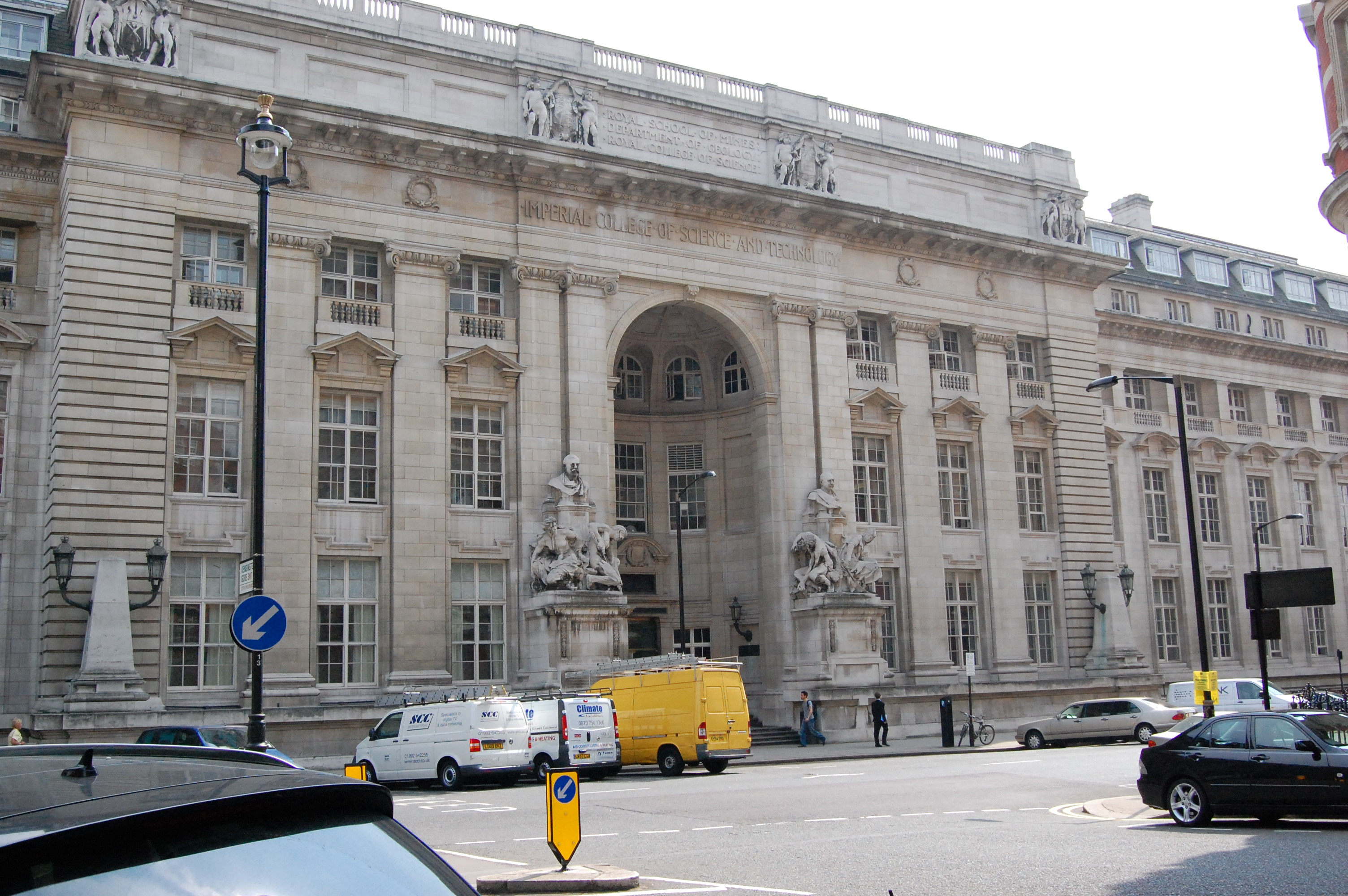
Imperial College, London, where Chitty worked.

Chitty moved to Imperial College in 1934 where she remained for the rest of her career, initially specialising in structural stresses in aircraft. During the 1930s, she was part of a group which analysed the crash of the airship R38, and published various Air Ministry papers on stresses and strains on airship structures. She was an early member of the Women's Engineering Society.

Her World War II work included research into stresses in submarine hulls under shell attack, extensible cables and pulley blocks for barrage balloons, for the Director of Scientific Research of the Admiralty and the Ministry of Supply. Later research interests included arches and arch dams - in particular, the Dukan Dam in Iraq - and she contributed to an international symposium on arched dams in 1968.

Initially an Imperial College research assistant, Chitty became a lecturer in 1937, and retired in 1962. She was the first female Fellow of the Royal Aeronautical Society (FRAeS), the third female Corporate Member of the Institution of Civil Engineers and the first woman to be appointed to an ICE technical committee, in 1958. She was awarded four Telford Premium medals for papers written with Pippard, and in 1969 became the first woman to receive the Telford Gold Medal.

She travelled widely and published a book, "Abroad. An alphabet of Flowers", in 1948, with her own drawings and notes about her holidays.

In her will, she left a bequest to Imperial College, which named its Library reading room after her. Imperial College also presents a Letitia Chitty Centenary Memorial Prize, while Newnham College has presented a 'Letitia Chitty Award for Engineering'.
