= Enclosure =

In England, appropriation of common land

Enclosure or inclosure (Note: The words "enclosure" and "inclosure" are used in this article. Although the two words are used interchangeably there is a fundamental difference between them. An enclosure is a physical boundary around a piece of land. Inclosure is a legal term that refers to the conversion of common land into private land. When land is inclosed the rights of the commoner cease.) is a term, used in English landownership, that refers to the appropriation of "waste" (Note: Land of a poor quality that was only useful for grazing animals or collecting fuel. Holdings described "not in use" or "waste" paid no tax.) or "common land" (Note: Although 'owned' by the manorial lord, commoners had legal rights over the land and the manorial lord could not enclose it.), enclosing it, and by doing so depriving commoners of their traditional rights of access and usage. Agreements to enclose land could be either through a formal or informal process. The process could normally be accomplished in three ways. First there was the creation of "closes", (Note: Small fields or paddocks usually created by the partitioning of larger ancient open field.) taken out of larger common fields by their owners. (Note: By 1750 this had led to the loss of up to half the common fields of many English villages.) Secondly, there was enclosure by proprietors, owners who acted together, usually small farmers or squires, leading to the enclosure of whole parishes. Finally there were enclosures by acts of Parliament.

The stated justification for enclosure was to improve the efficiency of agriculture. However, there were a range of motives, one example being that the value of the land enclosed would be substantially increased. There were social consequences to the policy, with many protests at the removal of rights from the common people. Enclosure riots are seen by historians as 'the pre-eminent form' of social protest from the 1530s to 1640s.

== History ==
After William I invaded and conquered England in 1066, he distributed its land amongst 180 barons, who held it as his tenants in chief, establishing a feudal system. However, he promised the English people that he would keep the laws of Edward the Confessor. Thus commoners were still able to exercise their ancient customary rights. The original contract bound the people who occupied the land to provide some form of service. This later evolved into a financial agreement that avoided or replaced the service.

Following the introduction of the feudal system, there was an increase in the economic growth and urban expansion of the country. In the 13th century, successful lords did very well financially, while the peasants faced with ever increasing costs did not, and their landholding dwindled. After outbreaks of the Black Death in the middle of the 14th century however, there was a major decline in population and crop yields. The decline in population left the surviving farm workers in great demand. Landowners faced the choice of raising wages to compete for workers or letting their lands go unused. Wages for labourers rose and translated into inflation across the economy. The ensuing difficulties in hiring labour has been seen as causing the abandonment of land and the demise of the feudal system, although some historians have suggested that the effects of the Black Death may have only sped up an already on-going process.

From as early as the 12th century agricultural land had been enclosed. However, the history of enclosure in England is different from region to region. Parts of south-east England (notably sections of Essex and Kent) retained the pre-Roman Celtic field system of farming in small enclosed fields. Similarly in much of west and north-west England, fields were either never open, or were enclosed early. The primary area of field management, known as the "open field system," was in the lowland areas of England in a broad band from Yorkshire and Lincolnshire diagonally across England to the south, taking in parts of Norfolk and Suffolk, Cambridgeshire, large areas of the Midlands, and most of south central England.

== Definitions ==
Enclosure

- Was the removal of common rights that people held over farm lands and parish commons.
- It was the re-allocation of scattered strips of land into large new fields that were enclosed either by hedges, walls or fences.
- The newly created enclosed fields were reserved for the sole use of individual owners or their tenants.

Inclosure

- Inclosure is the spelling used in laws and statutes.

Villagers

- Lord of the manor
- Freeholders or yeomanry. Proprietors of large and small properties
- Copyholders. (Note: Copyholders held their land according to the custom of the manor. The mode of landholding took its name from the fact that the title deed received by the tenant was a copy of the relevant entry in the manorial court roll)
- Tenant farmers
- Cottagers/cottar
- Squatters
- Farm servants living in their employers' house

== Methods of enclosure ==
There were essentially two broad categories of enclosure, these were 'formal' or 'informal' agreements. Formal enclosure was achieved either through act of Parliament, or, from 1836 onwards, by a written agreement signed by all parties involved. The written record would usually include a map.

With informal agreements there was either minimal or no written record other than occasionally a map of the agreement. The most straightforward informal enclosure was through 'unity of possession'. Under this, if an individual managed to acquire all the disparate strips of land in an area and consolidate them in one whole piece, for example a manor, then any communal rights would cease to exist, since there was no one to exercise them.

=== Open-field system ===
Before the enclosures in England, "common land" was under the control of the manorial lord. The usual manor consisted of two elements, the peasant tenantry and the lord's holding, known as the demesne farm. The land the lord held was for his benefit and was farmed by his own direct employees or by hired labour. The tenant farmers had to pay rent. This could either be cash, labour or produce. Tenants had certain rights such as pasture, pannage, or estovers that could be held by neighbouring properties, or (occasionally) in gross (Note: Common in gross refers to a legal right granted to a person for access to another's land, for example to graze their animals.) by all manorial tenants. "Waste" land was often very narrow areas, typically less than 1 yard (0.91 m) wide, in awkward locations (such as cliff edges, or inconveniently shaped manorial borders), but also could be bare rock, it was not officially used by anyone, and so was often "farmed" by landless peasants.

The remaining land was organised into a large number of narrow strips, each tenant possessing several disparate strips (Note: There was no standard size for a strip of land and most holdings had between forty and eighty.) throughout the manor, as would the manorial lord. The open-field system was administered by manorial courts, which exercised some collective control. The land in a manor under this system would consist of:

- Two or three very large common fields (Note: Large area of arable land divided into strips.)
- Several very large common hay meadows (Note: Known as dole or dale meadow.)
- Closes.
- In some cases, a park.
- Common waste.

What might now be termed a single field would have been divided under this system among the lord and his tenants; poorer peasants (serfs or copyholders, depending on the era) were allowed to live on the strips owned by the lord in return for cultivating his land. The open-field system was probably a development of the earlier Celtic field system, which it replaced. The open-field system used a three-field crop rotation system. Barley, oats, or legumes would be planted in one field in spring, wheat or rye in the second field in the autumn. There was no such thing as artificial fertilizer in mediaeval England, so the continual use of arable land for crops would exhaust the fertility of the soil. The open-field system solved that problem. It did this by allowing the third field, of the arable land, to be uncultivated each year and use that "fallow" field for grazing animals, on the stubble of the old crop. The manure the animals produced in the fallow field would help restore its fertility. The following year, the fields for planting and fallow would be rotated.

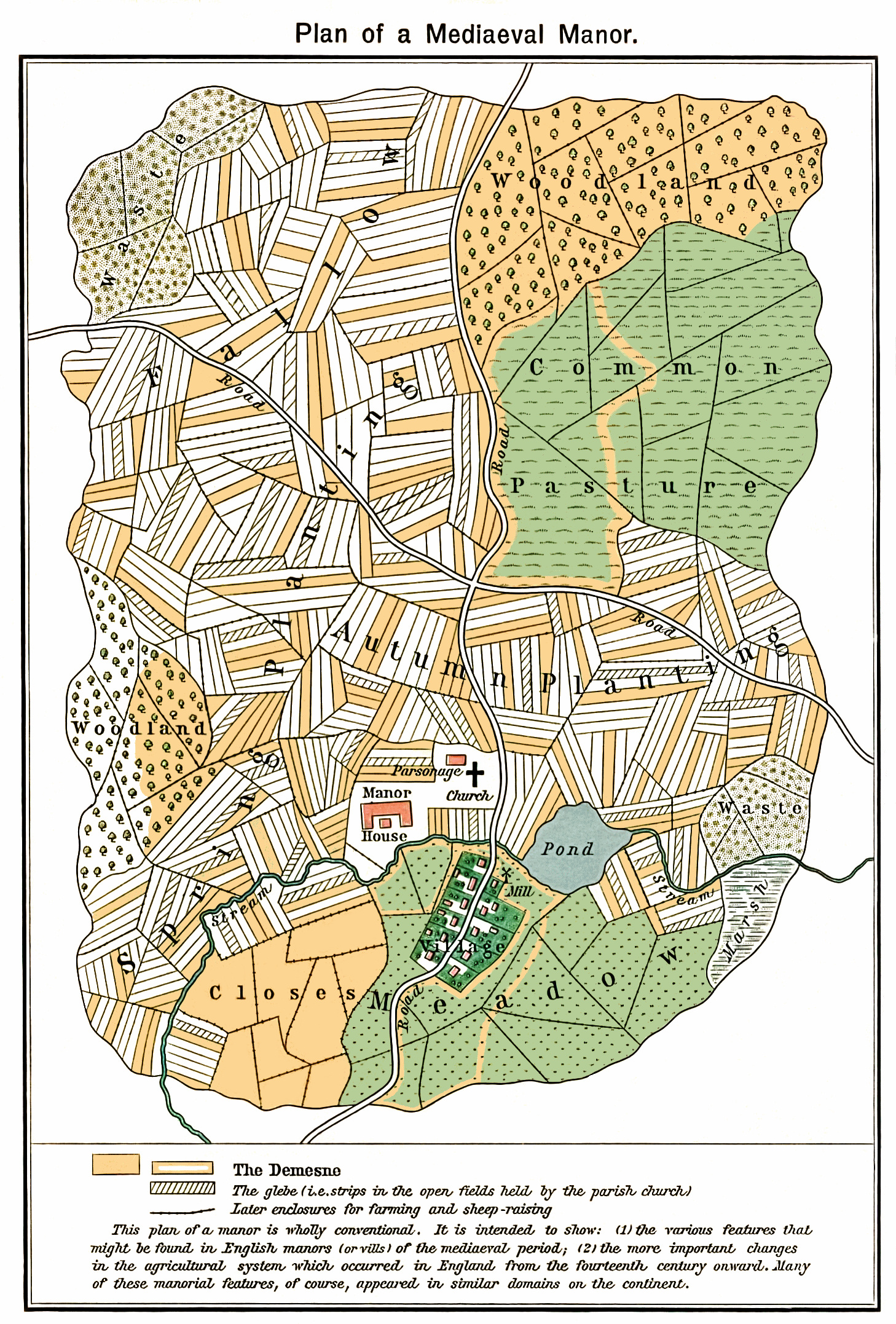
Conjectural map of a mediaeval English manor. The part allocated to 'common pasture' is shown in the north-east section, shaded green.

Three-field system with ridge and furrow fields (furlongs)

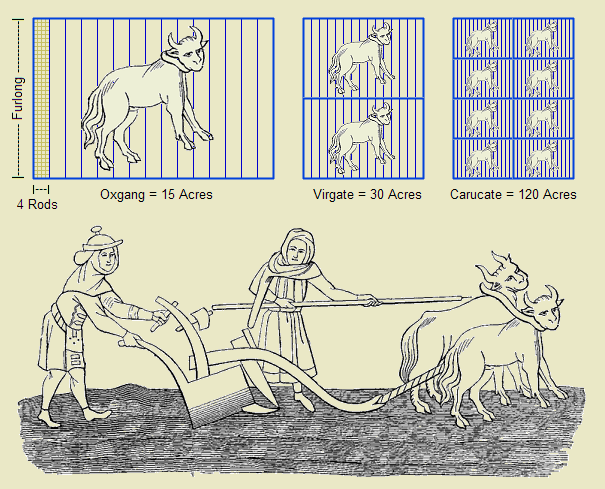
Division of farm land. 1 acre= 0.4 Ha. 1 virgate=30 acres (Note: Although one virgate is shown to be 30 acres, as it was not standardised one virgate could range from 15 to 40 acres.)

The open-field system

The very nature of the three field rotation system imposed a discipline on lord and tenants in their management of the arable land. Every one had the freedom to do what they liked with their own land but had to follow the rhythms of the rotation system. The land-holding tenants had livestock, including sheep, pigs, cattle, horses, oxen, and poultry, and after harvest, the fields became 'common' so they could graze animals on that land. There are still examples of villages that use the open-field system, one example being Laxton, Nottinghamshire.

=== The end of the open-field system ===
Seeking better financial returns, landowners looked for more efficient farming techniques. They saw enclosure as a way to improve efficiency, (Note: Efficiency meant improvements in per unit acre yields and in total parish output.) however it was not simply the fencing of existing holdings; there was also a fundamental change in agricultural practice. One of the most important innovations was the development of the Norfolk four-course system, which greatly increased crop and livestock yields by improving soil fertility and reducing fallow periods. Wheat was grown in the first year, turnips in the second, followed by barley, with clover and ryegrass in the third. The clover and ryegrass were grazed or cut for feed in the fourth year. The turnips were used for feeding cattle and sheep in the winter. The practice of growing a series of dissimilar types of crops in the same area in sequential seasons helped to restore plant nutrients and reduce the build-up of pathogens and pests. The system also improves soil structure and fertility by alternating deep-rooted and shallow-rooted plants. For example, turnips can recover nutrients from deep under the soil. Planting crops such as turnips and clover was not realistic under the open field system (Note: M. E. Turner disagreed with this point of view. He posited that with a certain amount of organisation, turnips were grown in the open field system and were only grown marginally more under enclosure.) because the unrestricted access to the field meant that other villagers' livestock would graze on the turnips. Another important feature of the Norfolk system was that it used labour at times when demand was not at peak levels.

From as early as the 12th century, some open fields in Britain were being enclosed into individually owned fields. After the Statute of Merton in 1235 manorial lords were able to reorganize strips of land such that they were brought together in one contiguous block. (Note: Land owned by an individual, rather than in common, was known as Severals)

Copyholders had a "customary tenancy" (Note: The lord of the manor has the freehold to all the land of the estate. A "customary tenancy" is parcel of land, from the estate, held at the will of the lord according to the custom of the manor. A "copyhold tenancy" was a "customary tenancy" held by the copyholder. The manorial court was responsible for dealing with these tenancies.) on their piece of land that was legally enforceable. The problem was that a "copyhold tenancy" was only valid for the holder's life. The heir would not have the right to inheritance although usually by custom, in exchange for a fee (known as a fine), the heir could have the copyhold transferred. To remove their customary rights, the landlords converted the copyhold into a leasehold tenancy. Leasehold removed the customary rights but the advantage to the tenant was that the land could be inherited.

There was a significant rise in enclosure during the Tudor period. Enclosure was quite often undertaken unilaterally by the landowner, sometimes illegally. The widespread eviction of people from their lands resulted in the collapse of the open field system in those areas. The deprivations of the displaced workers has been seen by historians as a cause of subsequent social unrest.

=== Legislation ===
In Tudor England the ever increasing demand for wool had a dramatic effect on the landscape. The attraction of large profits to be made from wool encouraged manorial lords to enclose common land and convert it from arable to (mainly) sheep pasture. The consequent eviction of commoners or villagers from their homes and loss of their livelihoods became an important political issue for the Tudors. The resulting depopulation was financially disadvantageous to the Crown. The authorities were concerned that many of the people subsequently dispossessed would become vagabonds and thieves. Also the depopulation of villages would produce a weakened workforce and enfeeble the military strength of the state.

From the time of Henry VII, Parliament began passing acts either to stop enclosure, to limit its effects, or at least to fine those responsible. The so-called 'tillage acts', were passed between 1489 and 1597. (Note: The first being in 1489, the Tillage Act 1488 (4 Hen. 7. c. 19); this was followed by four acts under Henry VIII, the Tillage Act 1514 (6 Hen. 8. c. 5), the Tillage Act 1515 (7 Hen. 8. c. 1), the Tillage Act 1533 (25 Hen. 8. c. 13) and the Tillage Act 1535 (27 Hen. 8. c. 22); one under Edward VI, the Tillage Act 1551 (5 & 6 Edw. 6. c. 5); one under Mary, the Tillage Act 1555 (2 & 3 Ph. & M. c. 2); and three under Elizabeth I, including the Tillage Act 1562 (5 Eliz. 1. c. 2), the Tillage Act 1571 (13 Eliz. 1. c. 13) and the Tillage Act 1597 (39 Eliz. 1. c. 2).)

The people who were responsible for the enforcement of the acts were the same people who were actually opposed to them. Consequently, the acts were not strictly enforced. (Note: The government also appointed eight royal commissions between 1517 and 1636.) Ultimately with rising popular opposition to sheep farming, the Tillage Act 1533 (25 Hen. 8. c. 13) restricted the size of flocks of sheep to no more than 2,400. Then the Taxation Act 1549 (3 & 4 Edw. 6. c. 23) was introduced that imposed a poll tax on sheep that was coupled with a levy on home produced cloth. The result made sheep farming less profitable. However, in the end it was market forces that were responsible for stopping the conversion of arable into pasture. An increase in corn prices during the second half of the 16th century made arable farming more attractive, so although enclosures continued the emphasis was more on efficient use of the arable land.

== Parliamentary inclosure acts ==
Historically, the initiative to enclose land came either from a landowner hoping to maximise rental from their estate, or a tenant farmer wanting to improve their farm. Before the 17th century enclosures were generally by informal agreement. When they first introduced enclosure by act of Parliament the informal method continued too. The first enclosure by act of Parliament was in 1604 (the Melcombe Regis and Radipole, Dorset (Church) Act 1603 (1 Jas. 1. c. 30)) and was for Radipole, Dorset. This was followed by many more acts of Parliament and by the 1750s the parliamentary system became the more usual method.

The Inclosure Act 1773 (13 Geo. 3. c. 81) created a law that enabled "enclosure" of land, at the same time removing the right of commoners' access. Although there was usually compensation, it was often in the form of a smaller and poorer quality plot of land. Between 1604 and 1914 there were more than 5,200 inclosure bills which amounted to 6,800,000 acres (2,800,000 ha) of land that equated to approximately one fifth of the total area of England.

Parliamentary inclosure was also used for the division and privatisation of common "wastes" such as fens, marshes, heathland, downland and moors.

=== Commissioners of inclosure ===
The statutory process included the appointment of commissioners. The process of enclosure was weighted in favour of the tithe owner who had the right to appoint one inclosure commissioner for their parish. Tithe-owners (usually the Anglican clergy) could voluntarily commutate tithe payments to a rental charge, this would have the effect of reducing their income, so many refused to allow it. However the Tithe Act 1836 (6 & 7 Will. 4. c. 71) made it compulsory for tithe payments to be commutated to a rent charge instead.

Inclosure Act 1845 (Note: The citation of this act by this short title was authorised by section 1 of, and the first schedule to, the Short Titles Act 1896. Due to the repeal of those provisions it is now authorised by section 19(2) of the Interpretation Act 1978.)
- Act of Parliament
- Parliament of the United Kingdom
- Long title: An Act to facilitate the Inclosure and Improvement of Commons and Lands held in common, the Exchange of Lands, and the Division of intermixed Lands; to provide Remedies for defective or incomplete Executions, and for the Non-execution of the Powers of general and local Inclosure Acts; and to provide for the Revival of such Powers in certain cases.
- Citation: 8 & 9 Vict. c. 118
- Territorial extent: England and Wales (Note: Section 168.)

Dates
- Royal assent: 8 August 1845
- Commencement: 8 August 1845 (Note: The Acts of Parliament (Commencement) Act 1793.)
Other legislation
Amended by	Inclosure Act 1847; Statute Law Revision Act 1875; Commons Act 1876; Board of Agriculture Act 1889; Statute Law Revision Act 1891; Public Authorities Protection Act 1893; Perjury Act 1911; Allotments Act 1922; Justices of the Peace Act 1949; Statute Law Revision Act 1950; Highways Act 1959; Defence (Transfer of Functions) Act 1964; London Government Act 1963; Rent Act 1965; Statute Law (Repeals) Act 1981; Statute Law (Repeals) Act 1993; Statute Law (Repeals) Act 1998; Stamp Duty Land Tax (Consequential Amendment of Enactments) Regulations 2003; Commons Act 2006; Tribunals, Courts and Enforcement Act 2007

Status: Amended

Text of statute as originally enacted

Text of the Inclosure Act 1845 as in force today (including any amendments) within the United Kingdom, from legislation.gov.uk.

After the Inclosure Act 1845 (8 & 9 Vict. c. 118) permanent Inclosure Commissioners were appointed who could approve enclosures without having to submit to Parliament.

The Rev. William Homer was a commissioner and he provided a job description in 1766:

A Commissioner is appointed by Act of Parliament for dividing and allotting common fields and is directed to do it according to the respective interests of proprietors ... without undue preference to any, but paying regard to situation, quality and convenience. The method of ascertainment is left to the major part of the Commission ... and this without any fetter or check upon them beside their own honour confidence (and late indeed) awed by the solemnity of an oath. This is perhaps one of the greatest trusts ever reposed in one set of men; and merits all the return of caution attention and integrity which can result from an honest impartial and ingenuous mind.
(From William Homer, An Essay on the Nature and Method [of] the Inclosure of Common Fields. 1766)

— Beresford 1946, pp. 130–140

After 1899, the Board of Agriculture, which later became the Ministry of Agriculture and Fisheries, inherited the powers of the Inclosure Commissioners.

One of the objectives of enclosure was to improve local roads. Commissioners were given authorisation to replace old roads and country lanes with new roads that were wider and straighter than those they replaced.

=== Enclosure roads ===
The road system of England had been problematic for some time. An 1852 government report described the condition of a road between Surrey and Sussex as "very ruinous and almost impassable." In 1749 Horace Walpole wrote to a friend complaining that if he desired good roads "never to go into Sussex" and another writer said that the "Sussex road is an almost insuperable evil". The problem was that country lanes were worn out and this had been compounded by the movement of cattle. Thus the commissioners were given powers to build wide straight roads that would allow for the passage of cattle. The completed new roads would be subject to inspection by the local justices, to make sure they were of a suitable standard. In the late eighteenth century the width of the enclosure roads was at least 60 feet (18 m), but from the 1790s this was decreased to 40 feet (12 m), and later 30 feet as the normal maximum width. Straight roads of early origin, if not Roman, were probably enclosure roads. They were established in the period between 1750 and 1850. The building of the new roads, especially when linked up with new roads in neighbouring parishs and ultimately the turnpikes, was a permanent improvement to the road system of the country.

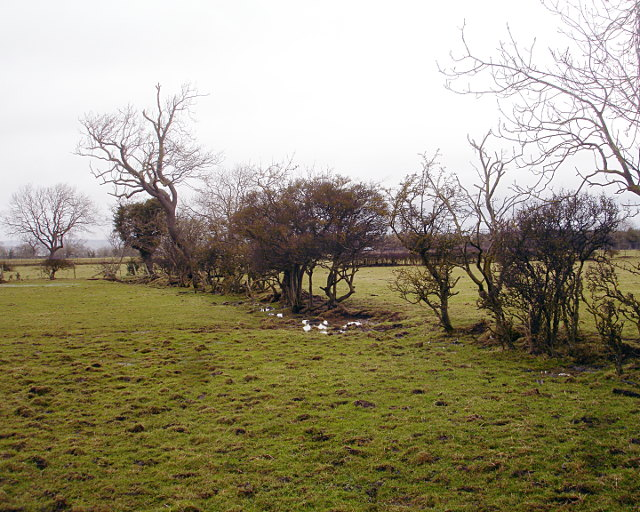
Decaying hedges mark the lines of the straight field boundaries created by the 1768 act of Parliament (Note: Bowes (Yorkshire) Inclosure Act 1766 (6 Geo. 3. c. 70)) for the enclosure of Boldron Moor, North Riding, Yorkshire. (Note: Boldron was in Startforth Rural District. The District was abolished and became, for administrative purposes, part of County Durham after the Local Government Act 1972.)

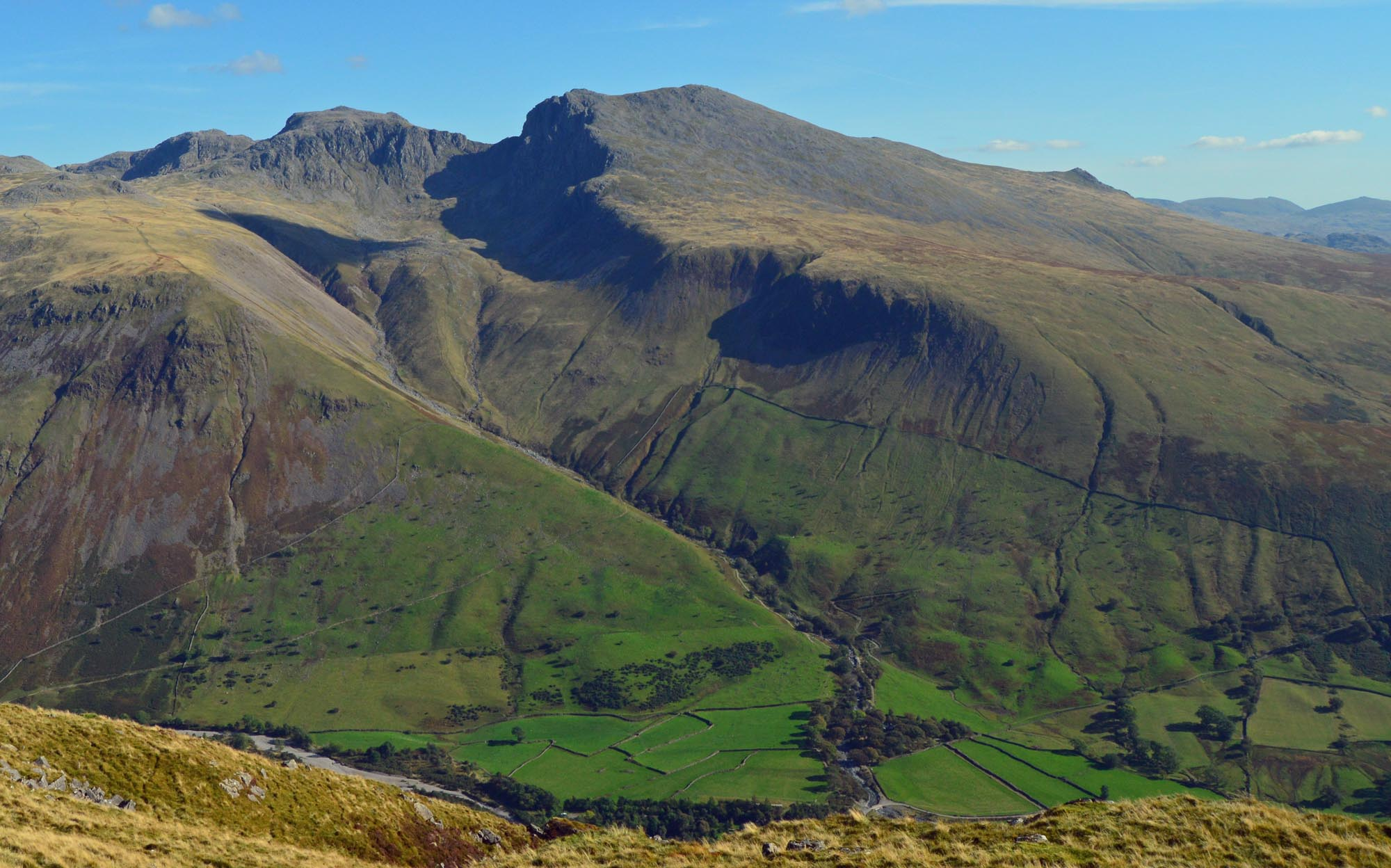
View of the Scafell massif from Yewbarrow, Wasdale, Cumbria. In the valley are older enclosures and higher up on the fell-side are the parliamentary enclosures following straight lines regardless of terrain.

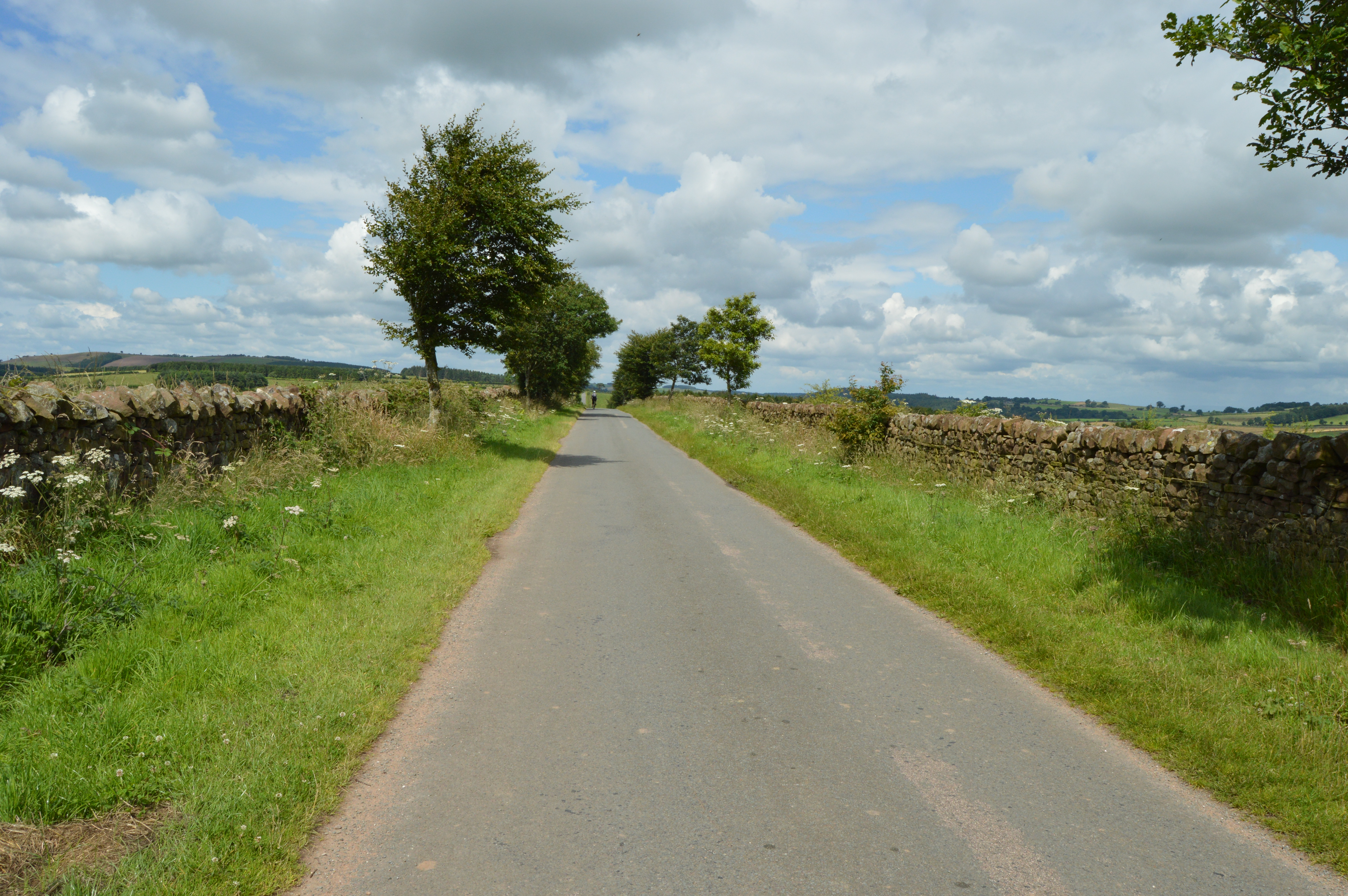
A parliamentary enclosure road near Lazonby in Cumbria. The roads were made as straight as possible, and the boundaries much wider than a cart width to reduce the ground damage of driving sheep and cattle.

== Social and economic factors ==
The social and economic consequences of enclosure has been much discussed by historians. In the Tudor period Sir Thomas More in his Utopia said:

The increase of pasture,' said I, 'by which your sheep, which are naturally mild, and easily kept in order, may be said now to devour men and unpeople, not only villages, but towns; for wherever it is found that the sheep of any soil yield a softer and richer wool than ordinary, there the nobility and gentry, and even those holy men, the abbots! not contented with the old rents which their farms yielded, nor thinking it enough that they, living at their ease, do no good to the public, resolve to do it hurt instead of good. They stop the course of agriculture, destroying houses and towns, reserving only the churches, and enclose grounds that they may lodge their sheep in them. As if forests and parks had swallowed up too little of the land, those worthy countrymen turn the best inhabited places into solitudes; for when an insatiable wretch, who is a plague to his country, resolves to enclose many thousand acres of ground, the owners, as well as tenants, are turned out of their possessions by trick or by main force, or, being wearied out by ill usage, they are forced to sell them; by which means those miserable people, both men and women, married and unmarried, old and young, with their poor but numerous families...)

— Thomas Mores Utopia. 1518

An anonymous poem, known as "The Goose and the Common", has come to represent the opposition to the enclosure movement in the 18th century:

"The law locks up the man or woman
Who steals the goose from off the common,
But lets the greater felon loose
Who steals the common from the goose."

— 18th century poem by Anon.

According to one academic: "This poem is one of the pithiest condemnations of the English enclosure movement—the process of fencing off common land and turning it into private property. In a few lines, the poem manages to criticize double standards, expose the artificial and controversial nature of property rights, and take a slap at the legitimacy of state power. And it does it all with humor, without jargon, and in rhyming couplets."

In 1770 Oliver Goldsmith wrote the poem The Deserted Village, in which he condemns rural depopulation, the enclosure of common land, the creation of landscape gardens and the pursuit of excessive wealth.

During the 19th and early 20th century historians generally had sympathy for the cottagers who rented their dwellings from the manorial lord and also the landless labourers. John and Barbara Hammond said that "enclosure was fatal to three classes: the small farmer, the cottager and the squatter." "Before enclosure the cottager (Note: The legal definition of a cottage, in England, is a small house for habitation without land. During the reign of Elizabeth I a statute mandated that a cottage had to be built with at least 4 acres (16,000 m^{2}) of land. Thus the cottager was someone who lived in a cottage with a smallholding of land, the statute was later repealed.) was a labourer with land; after enclosure was a labourer without land."

Marxist historians, such as Barrington Moore Jr., focused on enclosure as a part of the class conflict that eventually eliminated the English peasantry and saw the emergence of the bourgeoisie. From this viewpoint, the English Civil War provided the basis for a major acceleration of enclosures. The parliamentary leaders supported the rights of landlords vis-à-vis the King, whose Star Chamber court, abolished in 1641, had provided the primary legal brake on the enclosure process. By dealing an ultimately crippling blow to the monarchy (which, even after the Restoration, no longer posed a significant challenge to enclosures) the Civil War paved the way for the eventual rise to power in the 18th century of what has been called a "committee of Landlords", a prelude to the UK's parliamentary system. After 1650 with the increase in corn prices and the drop in wool prices the focus shifted to implementation of new agricultural techniques, including fertilizer, new crops, and crop rotation, all of which greatly increased the profitability of large-scale farms. The enclosure movement probably peaked from 1760 to 1832; by the latter date it had essentially completed the destruction of the medieval peasant community. Surplus peasant labour moved into the towns to become industrial workers. The enclosure movement is considered by some scholars to be the beginnings of the emergence of capitalism; for many Marxists, the enclosures constituted "primitive accumulation," establishing the structural conditions necessary for a capitalist political economy.

In contrast to the Hammonds' 1911 analysis of the events, critically J. D. Chambers and G. E. Mingay, suggested that the Hammonds exaggerated the costs of change when in reality enclosure meant more food for the growing population, more land under cultivation and on balance, more employment in the countryside. The ability to enclose land and raise rents certainly made the enterprise more profitable.

Rises in rents immediately after enclosure 1765-1805 (D. McCloskey. "The openfields of England: rent, risk and the rate of interest, 1300-1815")
Village	County	Date of enclosure	Rise in rent
Elford	Staffordshire	1765	"trebled"
Lidlington	Bedfordshire	1775	83%
Coney Weston	Suffolk	1777	Doubled
23 villages	Lincolnshire	before 1799	92%
Riseley	Bedfordshire	1793	90%-157%
Milton Bryant	Bedfordshire	1793	88%
Queensborough	Leicestershire	1793	92%-130%
Dunton	Bedfordshire	1797	113%
Enfield	Middlesex	1803	33%
Wendelbury	Oxfordshire	c.1805	140%-167%

Arnold Toynbee considered that the main feature distinguishing English agriculture was the massive reduction in common land between the middle of the 18th to the middle of the 19th century.

The major advantages of the enclosures were:

- Effective crop rotation;
- Saving of time in travelling between dispersed fields; and
- The ending of constant quarrels over boundaries and rights of pasture in the meadows and stubbles.

He writes: "The result was a great increase in agricultural produce. The landowners having separated their plots from those of their neighbours and having consolidated them could pursue any method of tillage they preferred. Alternate and convertible husbandry … came in. The manure of the cattle enriched the arable land and grass crops on the ploughed-up and manured land were much better than were those on the constant pasture."

Since the late 20th century, those contentions have been challenged by a new class of historians. The Enclosure movement has been seen by some as causing the destruction of the traditional peasant way of life, however miserable. Landless peasants could no longer maintain an economic independence so had to become labourers. Historians and economists such as M.E.Turner and D. McCloskey have examined the available contemporary data and concluded that the difference in efficiency between the open field system and enclosure is not so plain and obvious.

Differences in crop yields open versus enclosed parishes 1801- Based on figures extracted from Home Office returns.
	Open Field			Enclosed		
	Wheat	Barley	Oats	Wheat	Barley	Oats
Mean acres per parish	309.4	216.0	181.3	218.9	158.2	137.3
Mean produce per parish (bushels)	5,711.5	5,587.0	6,033.1	4,987.1	5,032.2	5,058.2
Mean yield per acre (bushels)	18.5	25.9	33.3	22.8	31.8	36.8
A bushel is a measurement of volume = 8 imperial gallons (36 L; 9.6 US gal); 1 acre = 0.4 ha

== Social unrest ==
=== Enclosure riots ===
After the Black Death, during the 14th to 17th centuries, landowners started to convert arable land over to sheep, with legal support from the Statute of Merton of 1235. Villages were depopulated. The peasantry responded with a series of revolts. In the 1381 Peasants' Revolt, enclosure was one of the side issues. However, in Jack Cade's rebellion of 1450, land rights were a prominent demand. By the time of Kett's Rebellion of 1549, enclosure was a main issue; as was it in the Captain Pouch revolts of 1604-1607, when the terms "leveller" and "digger" appeared, referring to those who levelled the ditches and fences erected by enclosers.

D. C. Coleman writes that "many troubles arose over the loss of common rights" with resentment and hardship coming from various channels including the "loss of ancient rights in the woodlands to cut underwood, to run pigs".

The protests against enclosure were not just confined to the countryside. Enclosure riots also occurred in towns and cities across England in the late 15th and early 16th century. The urban unrest was distributed across the whole of the country from York in the north, to Southampton in the south and Gloucester in the west, to Colchester in the east. The urban rioters were not necessarily agricultural workers but consisted of artisanal workers such as butchers, shoemakers, plumbers, clothmakers, millers, weavers, glovers, shearmen, barbers, cappers, tanners and glaziers.

==== Midland Revolt ====
In May and June 1607 the villages of Cotesbach (Leicestershire); Ladbroke, Hillmorton and Chilvers Coton (Warwickshire); and Haselbech, Rushton and Pytchley (Northamptonshire) saw protests against enclosures and depopulation. The rioting that took place became known as the Midland Revolt and drew considerable popular support from the local people. (Note: The people involved in the protest were not just the dispossessed tenants of depopulated Midland villages but also included urban-dwellers struggling to make ends meet in the towns, especially Leicester and Kettering.) It was led by John Reynolds, otherwise known as 'Captain Pouch' who was thought to be an itinerant pedlar or tinker, by trade, and said to have originated from Desborough, Northamptonshire. He told the protesters he had authority from the King and the Lord of Heaven to destroy enclosures and promised to protect protesters by the contents of his pouch, carried by his side, which he said would keep them from all harm (after he was captured, his pouch was opened; all that was in it was a piece of mouldy cheese). A curfew was imposed in the city of Leicester, as it was feared citizens would stream out of the city to join the riots. A gibbet was erected in Leicester as a warning, and was pulled down by the citizens.

==== Newton Rebellion: 8 June 1607 ====
The Newton Rebellion was one of the last times that the non-mining commoners of England and the gentry were in open, armed conflict. Things had come to a head in early June. James I issued a proclamation and ordered his deputy lieutenants in Northamptonshire to put down the riots. It is recorded that women and children were part of the protest. Over a thousand had gathered at Newton, near Kettering, pulling down hedges and filling ditches, to protest against the enclosures of Thomas Tresham.

The Treshams were unpopular for their voracious enclosing of land – the family at Newton and their better-known Roman Catholic cousins at nearby Rushton, the family of Francis Tresham, who had been involved two years earlier in the Gunpowder Plot and had by announcement died in London's Tower. Sir Thomas Tresham of Rushton was vilified as 'the most odious man' in Northamptonshire. The old Roman Catholic gentry family of the Treshams had long argued with the emerging Puritan gentry family, the Montagus of Boughton, about territory. Now Tresham of Newton was enclosing common land – The Brand Common – that had been part of Rockingham Forest.

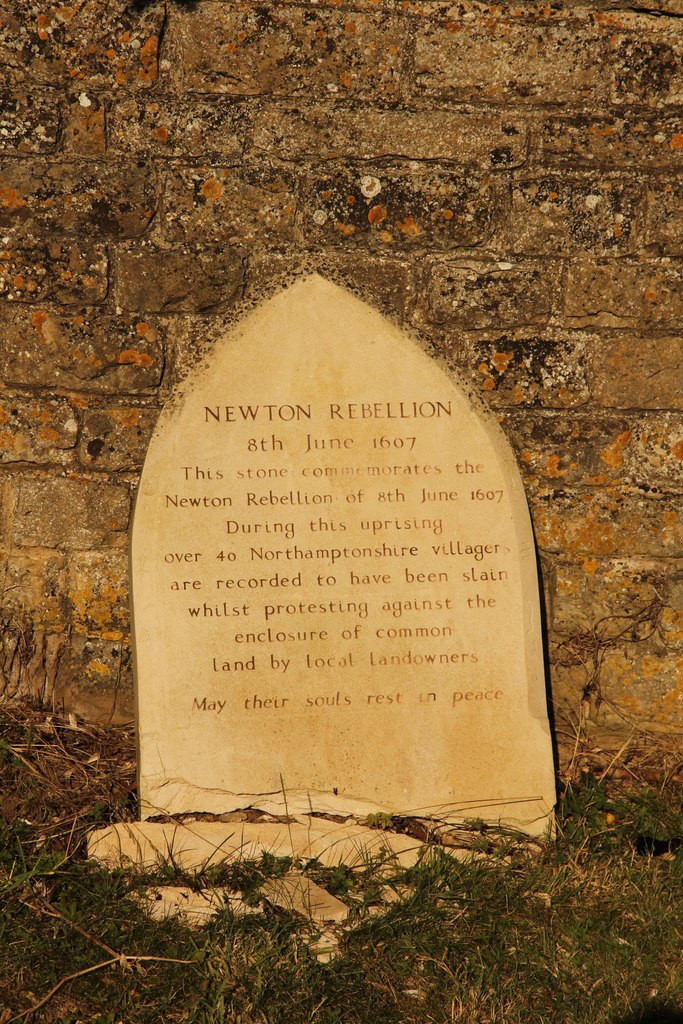
Memorial stone commemorating those killed in the Newton Rebellion at the former church of St Faith.

Edward Montagu, one of the deputy lieutenants, had stood up against enclosure in Parliament some years earlier, but was now placed by the king in the position effectively of defending the Treshams. The local armed bands and militia refused the call-up, so the landowners were forced to use their own servants to suppress the rioters on 8 June 1607. The royal proclamation of King James was read twice. The rioters continued in their actions, although at the second reading some ran away. The gentry and their forces charged. A pitched battle ensued in which 40–50 people were killed; the ringleaders were hanged and quartered. A much-later memorial stone to those killed stands at the former church of St Faith, Newton, Northamptonshire.

NEWTON REBELLION

8th June 1607
This stone commemorates the
Newton Rebellion of 8th June 1607
During this uprising
over 40 Northamptonshire villagers
are recorded to have been slain
whilst protesting against the enclosure of common
land by local landowners

May their souls rest in peace.
(Inscription on memorial stone at St Faiths'.)

— Calder 2009

The Tresham family declined soon after 1607. The Montagu family went on through marriage to become the Dukes of Buccleuch, enlarging the wealth of the senior branch substantially.

==== Western Rising 1630–32 and forest enclosure ====
Although royal forests were not technically commons, they were used as such from at least the 1500s onwards. By the 1600s, when Stuart kings examined their estates to find new revenues, it had become necessary to offer compensation to at least some of those using the lands as commons when the forests were divided and enclosed. The majority of the disafforestation took place between 1629 and 1640, during Charles I of England's Personal Rule. Most of the beneficiaries were royal courtiers, who paid large sums to enclose and sublet the forests. Those dispossessed of the commons, especially recent cottagers and those who were outside of tenanted lands belonging to manors, were granted little or no compensation, and rioted in response.

== See also ==
- British Agricultural Revolution – Mid-17th to late 19th century revolution centred around agriculture
- the Diggers – Group of Protestant agrarian socialists in 17th-century England
- Closure (sociology) – Social phenomena
- Gerrard Winstanley – English philosopher and activist (1609–1676)
- Levellers – 1640s English political movement
- Highland Clearances – Evictions in Scottish Highlands, c. 1750–1860
- Lowland Clearances – Displacement of farmers in Scottish Lowlands
- Primitive accumulation of capital – Marxist theory of the origin of capitalism
- Swing Riots – 1830 uprisings by English agricultural workers
- Abandoned village – Village that has been deserted
- Accumulation by dispossession – Policies to centralize wealth and power
- Tragedy of the commons – Overuse of a shared resource
- Digital enclosure

=== In other countries ===
- Bocage – Terrain of mixed woodland and pasture
- Range war – Conflict over control of range land used for grazing
