= Ridler =

Ridler is a surname. Notable people with the surname include:

- Anne Ridler (1912–2001), British poet and editor
- David Ridler (born 1976), British footballer and team manager
- Horace Ridler (1892–1969), British sideshow tattooed man
- Nick Ridler, British engineer
- Tony Ridler (1954–2015), Welsh darts player
- Vivian Ridler (1913–2009), English printer, typographer and scholar

== See also ==
- Ridler Award, presented at the annual Detroit Autorama for best in show custom-built car
