= Edward Bradby (cricketer) =

English cricketer and solicitor

Personal information
- Full name: Edward Hugh Falkwin Bradby
- Born: 7 November 1866; Harrow, Middlesex, England
- Died: 7 November 1947 (aged 81); Kensington, London, England
- Batting: Right-handed
- Relatives: Henry Bradby (brother); Arthur Chitty (brother-in-law)

Domestic team information
- Years: Team
- 1886: Oxford University

Career statistics
Competition	First-class
Matches	1
Runs scored	4
Batting average	2.00
100s/50s	–/–
Top score	4
Catches/stumpings	–/–
- Source: Cricinfo, 2 February 2020

Edward Hugh Falkwin Bradby (8 November 1866 – 7 November 1947) was an English first-class cricketer and solicitor.

The son of Edward Bradby senior, he was born at Harrow in November 1866. He was educated at Rugby School, before going up to Oriel College, Oxford. While studying at Oxford, he made a single appearance in first-class cricket for Oxford University against the Marylebone Cricket Club at Oxford in 1886. Batting twice in the match, he was dismissed for 4 runs in the Oxford first-innings by W. G. Grace, while in their second-innings he was dismissed without scoring by the same bowler. After graduating from Oxford, he became a solicitor in 1891. Bradby died at Kensington in November 1947. His siblings included the historian Barbara Hammond, the poet and cricketer Henry Bradby, and the author Godfrey Bradby. His brother-in-law, Arthur Chitty, was also a first-class cricketer.
