= Digital enclosure =

Digital enclosure is the process by which interactive digital spaces capture and privatize the activities of users so that participation itself becomes a source of economic value and surveillance. This model was originally developed by Mark Andrejevic, an associate professor at the University of Iowa.

== Definition ==
A digital enclosure is the process by which interactive digital spaces capture and privatize the activities of users so that participation itself becomes a source of economic value and surveillance.. The new interactivity-enhanced spaces born of the new digital era has created digital enclosures in both a physical and virtual sense. It is this enclosure that allows for individuals or companies to own, operate, and claim ownership over the information generated by the users who interact within their boundaries.

== Examples ==
Mark Andrejevic cites the example of Google and Earthlink to provide the city of San Francisco with free wireless access within the city in multiple articles. This project was to be funded through "contextual advertising", the use of custom-targeted ads developed by tracking the location of users throughout the day. This potentially opens the door for Google to create custom algorithms to gain information on users from search engine inquiries, map requests, and even Gmail accounts.

Companies who invest in such information from enclosures due to their potential profit contributes to what Andrejevic describes as "the work of being watched", individuals who unknowingly or willingly submit to giving up their information that generates such economic value in exchange for use of digital commodities.

Andrejevic connects this idea back to the forcible separation of workers from the means of production – a process defined by Marx as "primitive" accumulation. Marx developed this from the first agrarian enclosure of land, where works were separated from the land in order to force workers to regain access to be contractually regulated.

The model of digital enclosures is necessary to understanding new information commodities being valuable resources in the new era of digital capitalism. The private ownership of such enclosures aims to separate users from the means of interaction, transaction, communication, and expression, much like the farmer's separation from the land some centuries before. Andrejevic suggests that this new form of separation is even more seductive as it provides real benefits to the users. Communication and the purchasing of goods are streamlined and simplified, but users have little control over how their collected information is collected, used, and sold.

Legal scholar James Boyle illustrates that digital enclosures literalize the physical metaphor of the 'second enclosure' movement that is the enclosure of "the intangible commons of the mind." The second enclosure movement refers to a variety of strategies that have the purpose of privatizing, controlling and commodifying both information and intellectual property.

== Digital capitalism ==
Andrejevic outlines numerous implications for digital enclosures in the new era of digital capitalism. The first being the insincere use of users data, such as marketing dieting pills to those who have searched for results regarding losing weight or dating website to users whose data suggest their single relationship status. The second, the censorship of users is already in practice. Andrejevic cites the example of Microsoft suppressing blogs at the request of the Chinese government and then releasing the location of specific anti-government bloggers. Microsoft did so because of the potential lucrative market in China. This has even occurred in the United States. Mark Andrejevic states:

On the one hand, the Internet might represent a very powerful tool for free expression even – or perhaps especially – under authoritarian regimes. On the other hand, to the extent that expression becomes increasingly reliant upon private corporations more committed to the realities of the bottom line than to abstract principles of civil liberties, the technology that facilitates the ability to challenge entrenched power could evolve into a breathtakingly efficient tool for monitoring, tracking, and filtering dissident expression.

== See also ==
- Enclosure – In England, appropriation of common land
- Global surveillance – Mass surveillance across national borders
- Mass surveillance in the United States
