= S. D. Chapman =

British historian, professor, and editor

Stanley David Chapman (born 1935) is a British historian. His works have focused primarily on industrial history.

== Education and career ==
In 1960 he was awarded an MA degree from Nottingham University and his thesis was titled ‘William Felkin, 1795–1874’. He earned his PhD from the University of London in 1966, his thesis being on ‘The Midlands Cotton and Worsted Spinning Industry, 1769–1800’. From 1968 until 1973 he was lecturer at Nottingham University and in 1973 he was appointed Pasold Reader in Textile History at Nottingham.

== Works ==
=== Books ===
- The Early Factory Masters: The Transition to the Factory System in the Midlands Textile Industry (Newton Abbot: David & Charles, 1967; reprinted Aldershot: Gregg Revivals, 1992).
- (with J. D. Chambers), The Beginnings of Industrial Britain (London: University Tutorial Press, 1970).
- Jesse Boot of Boots the Chemists: A Study in Business History (London: Hodder and Stoughton, 1974).
- Stanton and Staveley: A Business History (Cambridge: Woodhead-Faulkner, 1981).
- (with S. Chassagne), European Textile Printers in the Eighteenth Century: A Study of Peel and Oberkampf (London: Heinemann, 1981).
- The Rise of Merchant Banking (London: Allen & Unwin, 1984; reprinted, Aldershot: Gregg Revivals, 1992; Japanese edition, Yuhikaku, 1987).
- Merchant Enterprise in Britain: From the Industrial Revolution to World War I (Cambridge: Cambridge University Press, 1992).
- Hosiery and Knitwear: Four Centuries of Small Scale Industry in Britain c. 1589–2000 (Oxford: Oxford University Press, 2002).

=== Articles ===
- 'The Transition to the Factory System in the Midlands Cotton-Spinning Industry', The Economic History Review, New Series, Vol. 18, No. 3 (1965), pp. 526–543.
- 'Fixed Capital Formation in the British Cotton Industry, 1770-1815', The Economic History Review, Vol. 23, No. 2 (Aug., 1970), pp. 235–266.
- 'The Textile Factory before Arkwright: A Typology of Factory Development', The Business History Review, Vol. 48, No. 4 (Winter, 1974), pp. 451–478.
- 'Financial Restraints on the Growth of Firms in the Cotton Industry, 1790-1850', The Economic History Review, New Series, Vol. 32, No. 1 (Feb., 1979), pp. 50–69.
- 'British Marketing Enterprise: The Changing Roles of Merchants, Manufacturers, and Financiers, 1700-1860', The Business History Review, Vol. 53, No. 2, Early Commercial Aviation (Summer, 1979), pp. 205–234.
- 'The Establishment of the Rothschilds as Bankers', Jewish Historical Studies, Vol. 29 (1982-1986), pp. 177–193.
- 'British-Based Investment Groups before 1914', The Economic History Review, Vol. 38, No. 2 (May, 1985), pp. 230–251.
- 'Rhodes and the City of London: Another View of Imperialism', The Historical Journal, Vol. 28, No. 3 (Sep., 1985), pp. 647–666.
- 'Aristocracy and Meritocracy in Merchant Banking', The British Journal of Sociology, Vol. 37, No. 2 (Jun., 1986), pp. 180–193.
