= Midland Revolt =

1607 popular uprising in England

The Midland Revolt was a popular uprising which occurred in the Midlands of England in 1607. Beginning in late April in Northamptonshire, in Haselbech, Pytchley and Rushton, it spread to Warwickshire and Leicestershire in May. The riots were a protest against the enclosure of common land and drew considerable support, led by "Captain Pouch", otherwise John Reynolds, a tinker said to be from Desborough, Northamptonshire. He claimed authority from the King to destroy enclosures and promised to protect protesters with the contents of his pouch, carried by his side, which would keep them from harm. He urged them to use no violence in their efforts to destroy the enclosures. Three thousand were recorded at Hillmorton, Warwickshire and 5000 at Cotesbach, Leicestershire. A curfew was imposed in Leicester, for fear its citizens would stream out to join the riots. They pulled down a gibbet erected there as a warning. It was also during this period that the term 'leveller' was first used.

== Newton Rebellion ==
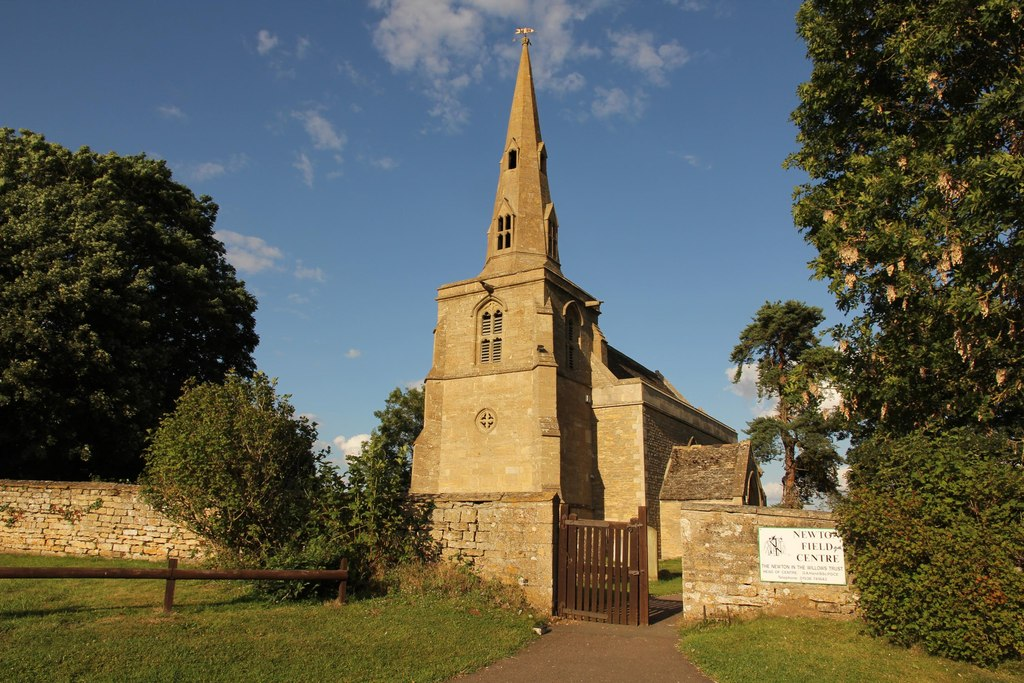
St Faith's Church, Newton

The culmination of the revolt was the Newton Rebellion. In early June, over a thousand protesters, including women and children, gathered in Newton, near Kettering, Northamptonshire, to protest against the enclosures by pulling out hedges and filling ditches. King James I ordered his deputy lieutenants in Northamptonshire to put down the riots. The Treshams – the family at Newton and their better-known Roman Catholic cousins at Rushton Hall under Francis Tresham, who had been involved two years earlier in the Gunpowder Plot and had apparently died in the Tower of London — were unpopular for voracious enclosure of land. Sir Thomas Tresham of Rushton was the gentleman "most odious in this country". The old Roman Catholic family of Treshams had long disputed about territory with an emerging Puritan family, the Montagus of Boughton House. Now Tresham of Newton was enclosing common land, the Brand, which had been part of Rockingham Forest.

Edward Montagu, a deputy lieutenant, had spoken against enclosure in Parliament some years earlier, but was now placed by the King in the effective position of defending the Treshams. Local armed bands and militia refused to serve, so that landowners had to use their servants to suppress the rioters on 8 June 1607. The royal proclamation was read twice, but the rioters continued and the gentry and their forces charged. Forty or fifty were killed in the pitched battle and the leaders of the protest were hanged and quartered.

There is a memorial to the executed at St Faith's Church, Newton, but parish and assize records have disappeared. The Tresham family declined soon after. The Montagu family went on through marriage to become Dukes of Buccleuch, one of the biggest landowners in Britain.

== Further readings ==
- Martin, John E.: Feudalism to Capitalism (London 1983)
- Hindle, Steve: "Crime & Popular Protest" in Coward, Barry Ed A Companion to Stuart Britain (Oxford 2003)
- Walter, John. "Reynolds, John". Oxford Dictionary of National Biography (online ed.). Oxford University Press. doi:10.1093/ref:odnb/67261. (Subscription, Wikipedia Library access or UK public library membership required.)
- Jones, Reece: Violent Borders - Refugees and the Right to Move (Verso 2017)
- Griffin C.J. and McDonagh, Briony: Remembering Protest in Britain since 1500 (Palgrave 2018)
- Pettit, Phillip A.J.: The Royal Forests of Northamptonshire (Northamptonshire Record Society, Volume XXIII, 1968)
- Page, R.G. "New insights into the Newton Riot of 1607" Northamptonshire Past and Present (Northamptonshire Record Society), No 71 pp. 17-35 (2018)
