= Henry Bradby =

English cricketer, schoolmaster, and poet

Henry Christopher
Personal information
- Full name: Henry Christopher Bradby
- Born: 28 December 1866; Hertford Heath, Hertfordshire, England
- Died: 28 June 1947 (aged 78); Ringshall, Hertfordshire, England
- Batting: Right-handed
- Relatives: Edward Bradby (brother); Arthur Chitty (brother-in-law)

Domestic team information
- Years: Team
- 1890: Oxford University

Career statistics
Competition	First-class
Matches	6
Runs scored	178
Batting average	19.77
100s/50s	–/–
Top score	40*
Catches/stumpings	5/–
- Source: Cricinfo, 3 February 2020

Henry Christopher Bradby (28 December 1866 – 28 June 1947) was an English first-class cricketer, schoolmaster and poet.

The son of Edward Bradby senior, the headmaster of Haileybury College, he was born in December 1868 at Hertford Heath, Hertfordshire. He was educated at Rugby School, before going up to New College, Oxford.

While studying at Oxford, he played first-class cricket for Oxford University in 1890, making his debut against the Marylebone Cricket Club at Oxford. He made five further first-class appearances for Oxford in 1890, scoring 178 runs at an average of 19.77, and with a highest score of 40 not out. After graduating from Oxford in 1891, he became a schoolmaster at Rugby School in 1892. During his tenure at Rugby, Bradby wrote a number of books about the school. During the First World War, he wrote the poem April 1918.

Bradby died in June 1947 at Ringshall, Hertfordshire.

His siblings included the historian Barbara Hammond, the solicitor and cricketer Edward Bradby, and the author Godfrey Bradby. His brother-in-law, Arthur Chitty, was also a first-class cricketer. His son Robert Christopher Bradby married the artist and illustrator Ethel “Bip” Pares.
