= Arthur Chitty =

English cricketer, barrister, entomologist

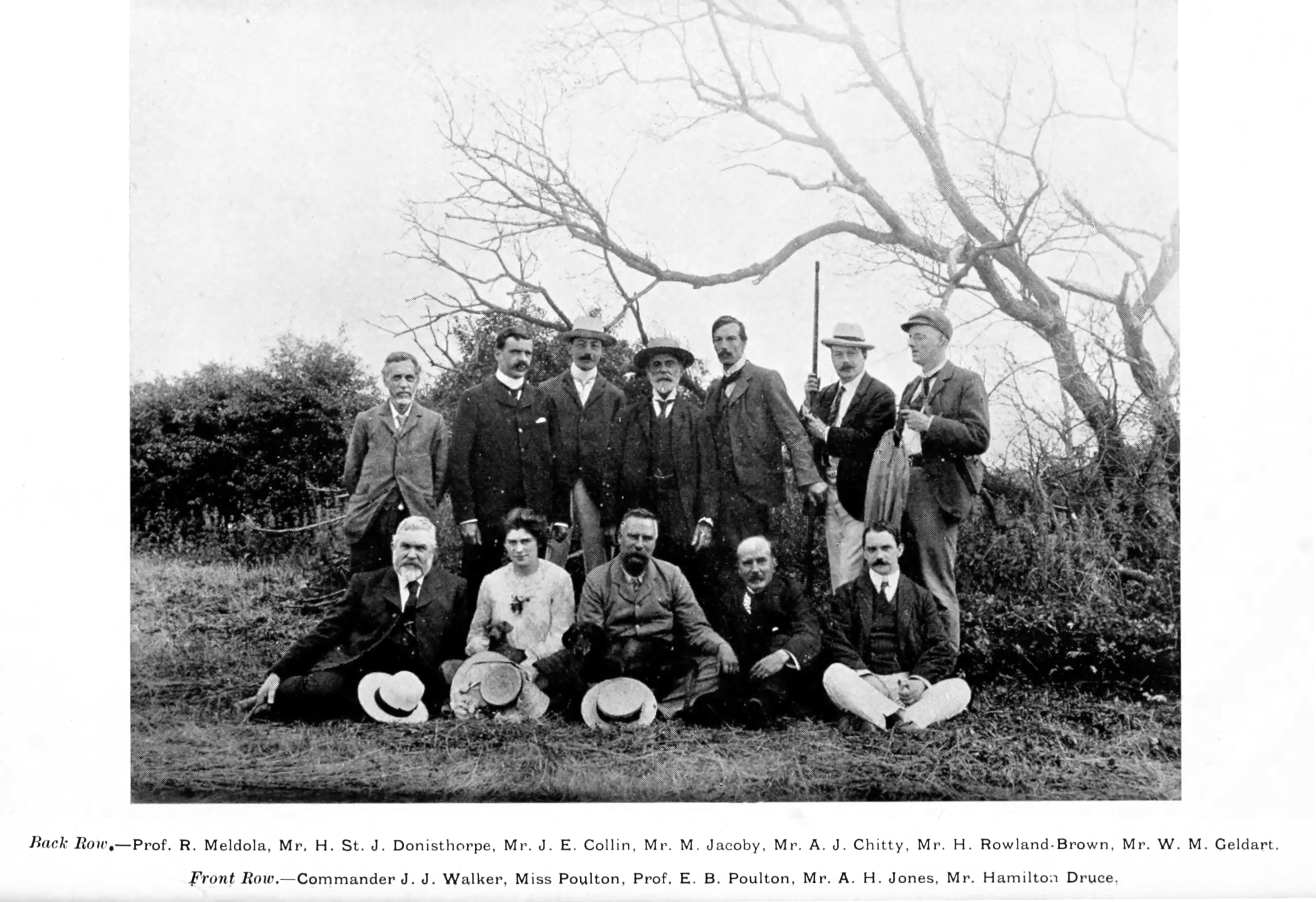
- Chitty with the Entomological Society in 1904 (standing, 3rd from right)

Personal information
- Full name: Arthur John Chitty
- Born: 27 May 1859; Marylebone, London, England
- Died: 6 January 1908 (aged 48); South Kensington, London, England
- Batting: Right-handed
- Relatives: Joseph Chitty (father); Edward Bradby (brother-in-law); Henry Bradby (brother-in-law)

Domestic team information
- Years: Team
- 1879: Oxford University

Career statistics
Competition	First-class
Matches	2
Runs scored	23
Batting average	11.50
100s/50s	0/0
Top score	10*
Catches/stumpings	2/–
- Source: Cricinfo, 29 May 2020

Arthur John Chitty (27 May 1859 – 6 January 1908) was an English first-class cricketer, barrister and entomologist.

The son of Joseph William Chitty, he was born in May 1859 at Marylebone. He was educated at Eton College, before going up to Balliol College, Oxford. While studying at Oxford, he made two appearances in first-class cricket for Oxford University against the Gentlemen of England and the Marylebone Cricket Club at Oxford in 1879. He scored 23 runs in his two matches, with a high score of 10 not out.

A student of the Middle Temple, Chitty was called to the bar in January 1885. He died at South Kensington in January 1908. His brothers-in-law Edward Bradby and Henry Bradby both played first-class cricket.
