= Landed gentry =

British and Irish social class of wealthy land owners

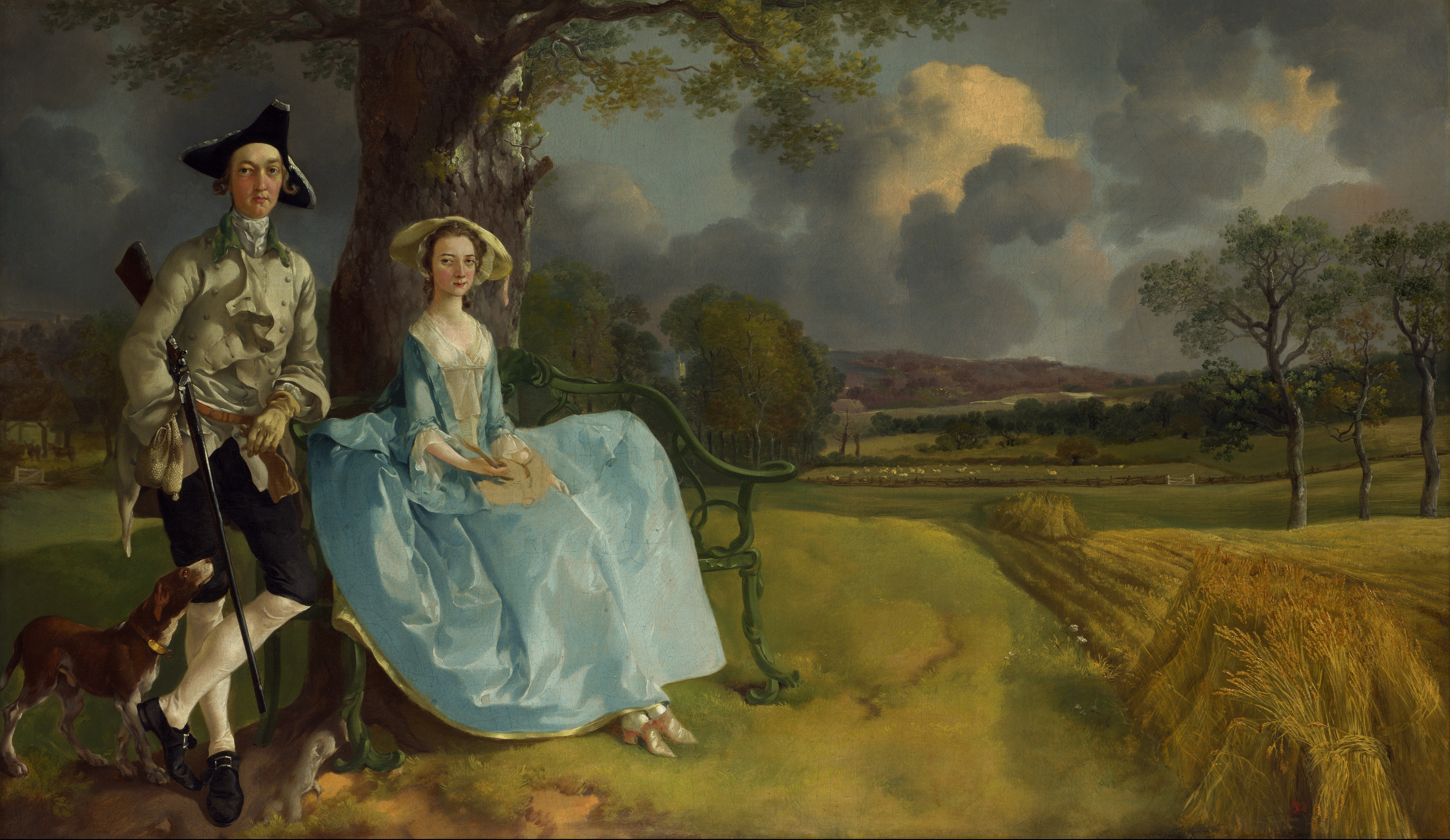
Mr and Mrs Andrews (c. 1750) by Thomas Gainsborough, a couple from the landed gentry, a marriage alliance between two local landowning families – one gentry, one trade. National Gallery, London.

The landed gentry (also known as the squirearchy or simply gentry) is a largely historical British and Irish social class of landowners who could generally live entirely from rental income, or at least owned a country estate. The British gentry comprised the lower tier of Britain's nobility, ranking below the British peerage in social status. Nevertheless, their economic base in land was often similar, and some of the landed gentry were wealthier than some peers. Many gentry were close relatives of peers, and it was not uncommon for gentry to marry into peerage. With or without noble title, owning rural land estates often brought with it the legal rights of the feudal lordship of the manor, and the less formal name or title of squire, in Scotland laird.

Generally lands passed by primogeniture, while the inheritances of daughters and younger sons were in cash or stocks, and relatively small. Typically the gentry farmed some of their land through employed managers, but leased most of it to tenant farmers. They also exploited timber and minerals (such as coal), and owned mills and other sources of income. Many heads of families also had careers in politics or the military, and the younger sons of the gentry provided a high proportion of the clergy, military officers, and lawyers. Successful burghers often used their accumulated wealth to buy country estates, with the aim of establishing themselves as landed gentry.

The decline of the gentry largely began with the great depression of British agriculture in the late 19th century; however, there are still many hereditary gentry in the UK. The book series Burke's Landed Gentry records the names of members of this class. The designation landed gentry originally referred exclusively to members of the upper class who were both landlords and commoners (in the British sense)—that is, they did not hold peerages. But by the late 19th century, the term was also applied to peers, such as the Duke of Westminster, who lived on landed estates.

== Origin of the term ==
The term gentry derives from gentrice, a word indicating high birth, high status, or gentleness. The term gradually came to be used for the lower ranks of the aristocracy, which along with the peerage had previously been considered part of the nobility. In the 16th and 17th centuries, writers referred to the peerage as the nobilitas major (Latin for "greater nobility") and the gentry as the nobilitas minor (Latin for "minor nobility"). Eventually, the terms nobility and gentry came to refer to completely separate classes.

== Definition and ranks ==
The gentry were aristocratic landowners who were not peers. According to historian G. E. Mingay, the gentry were landowners whose wealth "made possible a certain kind of education, a standard of comfort, and a degree of leisure and a common interest in ways of spending it". Leisure distinguished gentry from businessmen who gained their wealth through work. The gentry did not enterprise or marketeer but were known most for working in management of estates; their income came largely from rents paid by tenant farmers living these estates. By the 17th century, the gentry was divided into four ranks:

1. Baronet: a hereditary title created by James I in 1611, giving the holder the right to be addressed as Sir.
2. Knight: originally a mounted warrior who fought for the king and his barons during the Middle Ages. Knighthood eventually lost its martial connotations and was awarded to civilians in honour of service to the Crown. Like baronets, knights are addressed as Sir; however, the rank of knight is not hereditary.
3. Esquire: originally a knight's attendant or squire. In the 14th century, this rank could be conferred by the Crown. Certain officeholders, such as justices of the peace, were considered to be esquires. It was also applied to the sons of peers and the firstborn sons of baronets and knights.
4. Gentleman: the lowest rank within the gentry. Gentlemen ranked above yeomen or landowning farmers. The Statute of Additions of 1413 recognised gentlemen as a distinct social rank, but the line between the lower gentry and the yeomanry remained blurred.

In a historiographical survey, Peter Coss describes a number of approaches to deciding who was gentry. One is to view the gentry as those recognised legally as possessing gentility. However, Coss finds this method unsatisfactory because it "seems certain that gentility was widely felt and articulated within society long before legislation was in place to tell us so". Other historians define gentry by land ownership and income level, but there is still the problem of whether this should include professionals and town dwellers. Rosemary Horrox argues that an urban gentry existed in the 15th century. For some historians of early modern England, the gentry included families with coats of arms, but Coss notes that not all gentry were armigerous. Coss proposes that the gentry had three main characteristics: (1) landownership, (2) a nobility or gentility (shared with the peerage) that distinguished them from the rest of the population, and (3) a territorial-based collective identity and power over the larger population.

== Occupations ==
From the late 16th-century, the gentry emerged as the class most closely involved in politics, the military and law profession. It provided the bulk of Members of Parliament, with many gentry families maintaining political control in a certain locality over several generations (see List of political families in the United Kingdom). Owning land was a prerequisite for suffrage (the civil right to vote) in county constituencies until the Reform Act 1832; until then, Parliament was largely in the hands of the landowning class.

The gentry ranked above the agricultural sector's middle class: the larger tenant farmers, who rented land from the landowners, and yeoman farmers, who were defined as "a person qualified by possessing free land of forty shillings annual [feudal] value, and who can serve on juries and vote for a Knight of the Shire. He is sometimes described as a small landowner, a farmer of the middle classes." Anthony Richard Wagner, Richmond Herald wrote that "a Yeoman would not normally have less than 100 acres" (40 hectares) and in social status is one step down from the gentry, but above, say, a husbandman. So while yeoman farmers owned enough land to support a comfortable lifestyle, they nevertheless farmed it themselves and were excluded from the "landed gentry" because they worked for a living, and were thus "in trade" as it was termed. Apart from a few "honourable" professions connected with the governing elite (the clergy of the established church, the officer corps of the British Armed Forces, the diplomatic and civil services, the bar or the judiciary), such occupation was considered demeaning by the upper classes, particularly by the 19th century, when the earlier mercantile endeavours of younger sons were increasingly discontinued. Younger sons, who could not expect to inherit the family estate, were instead urged into professions of state service. It became a pattern in many families that while the eldest son would inherit the estate and enter politics, the second son would join the army, the third son go into law profession, and the fourth son join the church.

A newly rich man who wished his family to join the gentry (and they nearly all did so wish), was expected not only to buy a country house and estate, but often also to sever financial ties with the business which had made him wealthy in order to cleanse his family of the "taint of trade", depending somewhat on what that business was. However, during the 18th and 19th centuries, as the new rich of the Industrial Revolution became more and more numerous and politically powerful, this expectation was gradually relaxed.

== Landed gentry and nobility ==
Persons who are closely related to peers are also more correctly described as gentry than as nobility, since the latter term, in the modern British Isles, is synonymous with peer. However, this popular usage of nobility omits the distinction between titled and untitled nobility. The titled nobility in Britain are the peers of the realm, whereas the untitled nobility comprise those here described as gentry.

David Cannadine wrote that the gentry's lack of titles "did not matter, for it was obvious to contemporaries that the landed gentry were all for practical purposes the equivalent of continental nobles, with their hereditary estates, their leisured lifestyle, their social pre-eminence, and their armorial bearings". British armigerous families who hold no title of nobility are represented, together with those who hold titles through the College of Arms, by the Commission and Association for Armigerous Families of Great Britain at CILANE. Through grants of arms, new families are admitted into the untitled nobility regularly, thus making the gentry a class that remains open both legally and practically.

== Burke's Landed Gentry ==
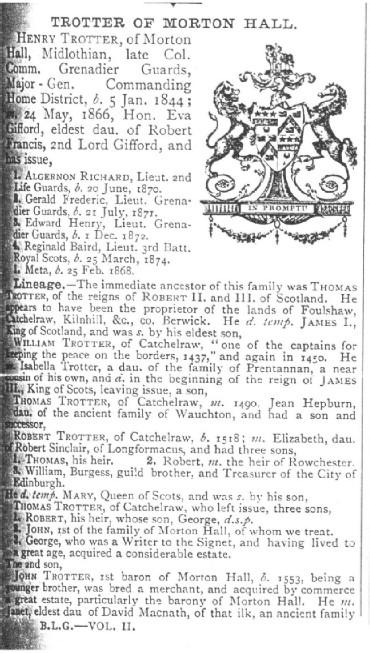
Typical entry in Burke's Landed Gentry (from Volume 2 of the 1898 edition)

In the 18th and 19th centuries, the names and families of those with titles (specifically peers and baronets, less often including those with the non-hereditary title of knight) were often listed in books or manuals known as "Peerages", "Baronetages", or combinations of these categories, such as the "Peerage, Baronetage, Knightage, and Companionage". As well as listing genealogical information, these books often also included details of the right of a given family to a coat of arms. They were comparable to the Almanach de Gotha in continental Europe.

In the 1830s, one peerage publisher, John Burke, expanded his market and his readership by publishing a similar volume for people without titles, which was called A Genealogical and Heraldic History of the Commoners of Great Britain and Ireland, enjoying territorial possessions or high official rank, popularly known as Burke's Commoners. Burke's Commoners was published in four volumes from 1833 to 1838. Subsequent editions were re-titled A Genealogical and Heraldic History of the Landed Gentry; or, Commons of Great Britain and Ireland or Burke's Landed Gentry.

The popularity of Burke's Landed Gentry gave currency to the expression Landed Gentry as a description of the untitled upper classes in England (although the book also included families in Wales, Scotland and Ireland, where, however, social structures were rather different). Burke's Landed Gentry continued to appear at regular intervals throughout the 19th and 20th centuries. A review of the 1952 edition in Time noted:

Landed Gentry used to limit itself to owners of domains that could properly be called "stately" (i.e. more than 500 acres or 200 hectares). Now it has lowered the property qualification to 200 acres (0.81 km^{2}) for all British families whose pedigrees have been "notable" for three generations. Even so, almost half of the 5,000 families listed in the new volume are in there because their forefathers were: they themselves have no land left. Their estates are mere street addresses, like that of the Molineux-Montgomeries, formerly of Garboldisham Old Hall, now of No. 14 Malton Avenue, Haworth.

== Contemporary status ==
The great depression of British agriculture at the end of the 19th century, together with the introduction in the 20th century of increasingly heavy levels of taxation on inherited wealth, put an end to agricultural land as the primary source of wealth for the upper classes. Many estates were sold or broken up, and this trend was accelerated by the introduction of protection for agricultural tenancies, encouraging outright sales, from the mid-20th century.

So devastating was this for the ranks formerly identified as being of the landed gentry that Burke's Landed Gentry began, in the 20th century, to include families historically in this category who had ceased to own their ancestral lands. The focus of those who remained in this class shifted from the lands or estates themselves, to the stately home or "family seat" which was in many cases retained without the surrounding lands. Many of these buildings were purchased for the nation and preserved as monuments to the lifestyles of their former owners (who sometimes remained in part of the house as lessees or tenants) by the National Trust for Places of Historic Interest or Natural Beauty. The National Trust, which had originally concentrated on open landscapes rather than buildings, accelerated its country house acquisition programme during and after the Second World War, partly because of the widespread destruction of country houses in the 20th century by owners who could no longer afford to maintain them. Those who retained their property usually had to supplement their incomes from sources other than the land, sometimes by opening their properties to the public.

In the 21st century, the term "landed gentry" is still used, as the landowning class still exists, but it increasingly refers more to historic than to current landed wealth or property in a family. One of numerous modern-day examples is Mark McClelland-Jones, Lord of Spofforth Castle. He holds the current Lordship as a direct descendant of Henry de Percy, 1st Baron Percy. Despite this, he neither owns nor has a modern connection to the Castle or surrounding area. Moreover, the deference which was once automatically given to members of this class by most British people has almost completely dissipated as its wealth, political power and social influence have declined, and other social figures such as celebrities have grown to take their place in the public's interest.

== In fiction ==
The landed gentry have appeared in fiction. Examples include Mr. Darcy in Pride and Prejudice, the Poldark family in Poldark and the Langrishe family in Langrishe, Go Down.

== See also ==
- American gentry
- Fee tail (or entail)
- Manorialism
- Patrician (post-Roman Europe)
- Ratione soli
