= Anne Ridler =

English poet, editor (1912–2001)

Anne Ridler OBE
- Born: Anne Barbara Bradby; 30 July 1912; Rugby, Warwickshire, England, United Kingdom
- Died: 15 October 2001 (aged 88)
- Education: Downe House School, King's College, London
- Occupations: Poet, playwright/dramatist, and editor
- Spouse: Vivian Ridler
- Family: Charles Richard Sumner (great-grandfather); Humphrey S. Milford (uncle); G. F. Bradby (uncle); Barbara Bradby (aunt); Robin Milford (cousin)

Anne Barbara Ridler OBE (née Bradby) (30 July 1912 – 15 October 2001) was a British poet and Faber and Faber editor, selecting the Faber A Little Book of Modern Verse with T. S. Eliot (1941). Her Collected Poems (Carcanet Press) were published in 1994. She turned to libretto work and verse plays; it was later in life that she earned official recognition, receiving an OBE in 2001.

== Early life ==
Anne Barbara Bradby was born in Rugby, Warwickshire, England on 30 July 1912. She was the daughter of Henry Bradby, housemaster at Rugby School. Her mother, Violet Bradby, born Milford, wrote popular children's stories and was the sister of Humphrey S. Milford, Publisher to the University of Oxford. One of her great-grandfathers was Charles Richard Sumner, Bishop of Winchester, a brother of John Bird Sumner, Archbishop of Canterbury. Her uncle, G. F. Bradby, was the author of The Lanchester Tradition (1919), while her aunt Barbara Bradby was the joint author of The Village Labourer (1911). Her cousins included Letitia Chitty, structural analytical engineer and first female fellow of the Royal Aeronautical Society, composer Robin Milford and the Rev. Dick Milford, vicar of the University Church of St Mary the Virgin, Oxford.

== Life ==
Anne Bradby was educated at Downe House School and later published a biography of her headmistress, Olive Willis. After six months in Florence and Rome, she took a diploma in journalism at King's College London in 1932.

In 1938, she married Vivian Ridler, the future Printer to Oxford University (1958–78), but then the manager of the Bunhill Press, London, and they had 4 children.

She edited Charles Williams: The Image of the City and other Essays (1958) and Charles Williams: Selected Writings (1961). A Christian and friend and correspondent of C. S. Lewis, she was on the edge of the Inklings group. Also closely associated with T. S. Eliot, she wrote a short but powerful poem, "I Who am Here Dissembled", full of allusions to images in Eliot's own poems, for the anthology T. S. Eliot: A Symposium in honour of his sixtieth birthday.

For a short time in the 1940s, Ridler was also a successful verse dramatist, writing such plays as Cain (1943) and Shadow Factory: A Nativity Play (1945). Poetry: A Magazine of Verse awarded her in 1954 the Oscar Blumenthal Prize and in 1955 the Union League Civic and Arts Poetry Prize. In 1998 she was one of four poets who received the Cholmondeley Award from the Society of Authors.

Ridler wrote the libretti to two operas by Elizabeth Maconchy, The Jesse Tree (1970) and The King of the Golden River (1975). She also wrote the libretto to Robert Sherlaw Johnson's The Lambton Worm (1978), and wrote English-language translations for multiple operas for performances on the opera stage by composes like Handel, Mozart, Monteverdi, and Cavalli.

Ridler died on 15 October 2001.
