= The Speaker (periodical) =

The Speaker was a weekly review of politics, literature, science and the arts published in London from 1890 to 1907. A total 895 issues were published.

The Speaker was published under the title The Speaker: A Review of Politics, Letters, Science and the Arts from 4 January 1890 to 30 September 1899 and then under the title The Speaker: The Liberal Review from 7 October 1899 to 23 February 1907 (its last issue). As The Speaker; A Review of Politics, Letters, Science and the Arts, the issues were numbered vol. 1, no. 1 (Jan. 4, 1890) through vol. 20, no. 509 (Sept. 30, 1899). As The Speaker: The Liberal Review, the issues were numbered new ser., vol. 1, no. 1 (Oct. 7, 1899) through vol. 15, no. 386 (Feb. 23, 1907).

G. K. Chesterton contributed about 100 articles to The Speaker. Some other famous contributors were Lord Acton, Hilaire Belloc, Oscar Wilde, Henry James, John Morley, and Sidney Webb. In 1901 W.B. Yeats wrote his Shakespearean dramatic manifesto, 'At Stratford-on-Avon', for the journal. Arthur Quiller-Couch was an assistant editor and contributed from 1890 to 1899. Other contributors to the weekly included Charles Bradlaugh, Marion Spielmann, Arthur Symons, John O'Connor Power, A. B. Walkley, and Charles Whibley. The late nineteenth century English novelist George Gissing bought a copy in April 1890 and wrote that he 'found it immensely dull'.

Wemyss Reid was the editor-in-chief from January 1890 to September 1899 and pursued an editorial policy as a moderate Liberal (in the vein of Gladstone) as contrasted to the "New Liberalism". In October 1899, replacing Wemyss Reid, John Lawrence Hammond became the editor-in-chief of The Speaker and instituted an editorial policy against the British actions in the Second Anglo-Boer War and in favour of the policies that eventually resulted in the Liberal welfare reforms of 1906–1914. After the Saturday, 25 August 1906 issue, Hammond ceased to be the editor, and Arthur Clutton-Brock ceased to be the literary editor.

In 1907, The Speaker became The Nation and was published under that title until February 1921 when it was merged into The Nation and Athenaeum.
