= John Lawrence Hammond =

British journalist (1872–1949)

John Lawrence Le Breton Hammond (18 July 1872 – 7 April 1949) was a British journalist and writer on social history and politics. A number of his best-known works were jointly written with his wife, Barbara Hammond (née Bradby, 1873–1961). She was the sister of poet and novelist G. F. Bradby.

He was educated at Bradford Grammar School and St John's College, Oxford, where he read classics. He was editor of the Liberal weekly The Speaker from 1899 to 1906. He was the leader-writer for The Tribune in 1906–1907 and for The Daily News in 1907. He was later on the staff of the Manchester Guardian.

== Works ==
- Charles James Fox a Political Study (1903)
- The Village Labourer 1760-1832: a Study of the Government of England before the Reform Bill (1911) with Barbara Hammond
- The Town Labourer 1760-1832: The New Civilisation (1917) with Barbara Hammond via Archive.org
- The Skilled Labourer 1760-1832 (1919) with Barbara Hammond
- The Terror in Action: A Graphic Sketch of Irish Policy from 1914-1921 (1921)
- Lord Shaftesbury (1923) with Barbara Hammond
- The Rise of Modern Industry (1925) with Barbara Hammond
- The Age of the Chartists 1832-1854: A Study of Discontent (1930) with Barbara Hammond
- James Stansfeld: A Victorian Champion of Sex Equality (1932) with Barbara Hammond
- Britain and the Modern World Order (1932) with Arnold J. Toynbee
- C. P. Scott of the Manchester Guardian (1934)
- The Bleak Age: England 1800-1850. 1934 – via Internet Archive. with Barbara Hammond
- Gladstone and the Irish Nation (1934)
- C. P. Scott, 1846 - 1932. The Making of the Manchester Guardian (1946) with C. E. Montague and H. D. Scott Nichols
- Gladstone and Liberalism (1952) with M. R. D. Foot
