= Vivian Ridler =

British printer, typographer and scholar (1913–2009)

- Born: October 2, 1913; Cardiff, Wales
- Died: January 11, 2009 (aged 95)
- Occupation(s): Printer, typographer and scholar

Vivian Hughes Ridler, CBE (2 October 1913 – 11 January 2009), was a British printer, typographer and scholar. He was Printer to the University of Oxford at Oxford University Press from 1958 until his retirement in 1978; and also established his own Perpetua Press.

== Biography ==
Ridler was born in Cardiff, on 2 October 1913. When he was a child, he and his family moved to Bristol. While still at Bristol Grammar School, he became interested in printing and typography. He bought an Adana platen, and with his friend, David Bland (who had a Wharfedale), established the Perpetua Press, a private press which they ran between 1931 and 1936. One year their Fifteen Old Nursery Rhymes was chosen as one of the 50 best books of the year. During this time, Ridler met Eric Gill and Douglas Cleverdon. After school he served a short apprenticeship at the Bristol firm of E. S. and A. Robinson.

Ridler got to know John Johnson, then Printer to the University of Oxford, and in 1936 went to Oxford to help the Assistant Printer, Charles Batey. In the late 1930s, Ridler moved from Oxford to London, to establish the Bunhill Press for Theodore Besterman, the Voltaire scholar. He also designed for the publishers Faber and Faber, where David Bland was Production Manager.

Through Bland he met Anne Bradby, who was working at Faber's as secretary to T. S. Eliot. In 1938, he and Anne were married, and they went on to have four children - Jane, Kate, Benedict, and Colin. Anne Ridler became well known as a poet, published first by Faber and later by Carcanet.

During the Second World War, Ridler served in the British Royal Air Force, in Orkney, Nigeria, and Germany. After the war he resumed free-lance designing, and also became the first tutor in typography at the Royal College of Art in London and typographer to Lund Humphries & Co. in Bradford.

In 1948, Charles Batey brought him back to Oxford, engaging him as Works Manager at the Oxford University Press. He was appointed Assistant Printer in 1950, and Printer in 1958. As Printer, he introduced film setting, rotary and web-fed letterpress and sheet- and web-fed offset, replaced collotype with 400-screen halftones and established a fully mechanised bindery. The Press mainly published dictionaries, reference works, bibles and academic books demanding complicated settings or exotic type; it also accepted commissions from external publishers, learned societies and examination boards. Among Ridler's productions were Stanley Morison's book on the Fell types, facsimiles of Eliot's The Waste Land and the Constable Sketchbooks and The Great Tournament Roll for the British College of Arms.

Ridler was widely known in printing beyond Oxford. During the war, he had been elected to the Double Crown Club (1943) and on demobilisation had lectured to the club on the typefaces of Eric Gill; in 1963 he served as its president. He was a founder of the Institute of Printing, an examiner in typographic design for the City and Guilds of London Institute, and served as President of the British Federation of Master Printers (later the British Printing Industries Federation), with its 4,000 members, from 1968 to 1969.

In 1971, Ridler was made a CBE. He became a fellow of the Oxford college of St Edmund Hall. He retired from the Oxford University Press in 1978.

After his retirement, Ridler ran his own printing shop, where he produced on his hand-press Christmas cards (often incorporating poems by Anne Ridler), broadsides, ephemera, and some small books under the revived imprint of the Perpetua Press; one was Mutiny on the Bembo, a set of comic verse lampooning publishing by his colleague OUP editor John Bell. An exhibition of some of his work was held at The Ruskin School of Drawing and Fine Art in Oxford University in 1993.

Ridler's wife, Anne, died in 2001. Ridler died on 11 January 2009, aged 95.

== See also ==
- Horace Hart
