= J. D. Chambers =

British historian (1898–1970)

- Born: Jonathan David Chambers; 13 October 1898; Underwood, Nottinghamshire, England
- Died: 11 April 1970 (aged 71)
- Education: University of Nottingham (PhD)
- Occupation: Historian

Jonathan David Chambers (13 October 1898 – 11 April 1970) was a British historian.

== Early life and career ==
Chambers was born at Haggs Farm in Underwood, Nottinghamshire, the son of a small farmer. His sister Jessie Chambers (later Wood), served as the prototype for 'Miriam Leivers' in D.H. Lawrence's novel Sons and Lovers. He was educated at the University College, Nottingham and graduated in 1919. Afterwards, he was English master at Ashby Grammar School and then lecturer in history at the University College's Department of Adult Education. He received his PhD in 1927 and during the Second World War he returned to Ashby Grammar School. In 1946 he was appointed head of Economic History at the University College (from 1948 the University of Nottingham) and from 1958 until 1965 he was Nottingham University's first Chair of Economic History. Also, he became a figure of considerable influence in the study of the local history of Nottinghamshire. In particular, he supported Vivian de Sola Pinto's initiative to build The D H Lawrence Collections at The University of Nottingham.

== Writings and assessment ==
He penned a groundbreaking study of Nottinghamshire's squirearchy, published in 1932 as Nottinghamshire in the Eighteenth Century: A Study of Life and Labour under the Squirearchy. The second edition was published in 1966. His most active period was 1953–1966, when he contributed important essays and articles, such as that on 'Enclosure and Labour Supply', as well as two books: The Workshop of the World: British Economic History from 1820–1880 (1961; 2nd ed. 1968) and The Agricultural Revolution, 1750–1880 (1966, with G. E. Mingay).

Chambers' Festschrift was published in 1967, titled Land, Labour, and Population in the Industrial Revolution. G. E. Mingay, one of Chambers' students, paid tribute to him after his death:

Everything that Chambers produced was carefully considered, thoroughly researched, and beautifully written: he belonged to that sadly unfashionable school who regard history as a form of literature; and in his hands it always was. ... [H]is contributions have undoubtedly made a permanent impact on the general history of agrarian change and population growth in this country. Perhaps his greatest influence, however, was a personal one. He presided over, and inspired a department of Economic and Social History which although never large in numbers has proved one of the most fruitful in the country. His teaching was always vital, his enthusiasm unbounded and infectious. He had the gift of bringing his subject alive and of making it absorbing to even the most casual of listeners. In private life his extraordinary range of interests, his love of music and literature, his enormous sense of fun, and fabulous fund of stories made him the liveliest of friends and the centre of any gathering. It was impossible to feel dull or depressed in his company.

== Works ==
- Nottinghamshire in the Eighteenth Century: A Study of Life and Labour under the Squirearchy (London: King, 1932; 2nd ed., Cass, 1966).
- (with E. I. Abell) The Story of Lincoln: An Introduction to the History of the City (Lincoln, City of Lincoln Education Committee, 1939; 2nd ed. with additions and corrections, S. R. Publishers Ltd, 1971).
- Dictators: An Introductory Study in the Social Origins of Dictatorship (London: Nelson, 1941).
- Modern Nottingham in the Making (Nottingham: Nottingham Journal Ltd, 1945).
- The Workshop of the World: British Economic History from 1820–1880 (London: Oxford University Press, 1961; Japanese translation, 1965-66; 2nd ed. (Oxford Paperbacks, University Series), 1968).
- (with G. E. Mingay) The Agricultural Revolution, 1750–1880 (London: Batsford, 1966).
- (with P. J. Madgwick) Conflict and Community: Europe since 1750 (London: Philips, 1968).
- (with S. D. Chapman) The Beginnings of Industrial Britain (Cambridge: University Tutorial Press, 1970).
- Population, Economy and Society in Pre-Industrial England, ed. W. A. Armstrong (Oxford: Oxford University Press, 1972).
