= Nick Ridler =

Nick Ridler from the National Physical Laboratory, in Middlesex, England, was named Fellow of the Institute of Electrical and Electronics Engineers (IEEE) in 2014 "for contributions to traceability in precision high-frequency electromagnetic measurements".
