= Edward Bradby =

Rev. Edward Henry Bradby (1827–1893) was a classicist.

== Academic timeline ==
He was educated at Rugby School and Balliol College, Oxford (1845). He served as Canon of St. Albans.

He was principal at Hatfield College, Durham University (1852), then House Master at Harrow (1853–1868) and finally Headmaster of Haileybury College (1868–1883). He retired somewhat early from Haileybury to do mission work in the east end of London, where he remained until his death.

== Children ==
- Lucy Barbara Hammond (née Bradby), historian
- Henry Christopher Bradby, cricketer, poet, teacher, father of poet Anne Ridler
- Godfrey Fox Bradby, author, teacher
- Edward Bradby, cricketer, solicitor
- Mabel Agatha Bradby (1865–1944), mother of Letitia Chitty, structural analytical engineer, first female fellow of the Royal Aeronautical Society
- Dorothy Bradby
