= G. E. Mingay =

British historian

Gordon Edmund Mingay (1923 – 3 January 2006) was a British historian.

== Early life ==
He was born in Long Eaton, Derbyshire and grew up in Chatham. His education was interrupted by the Second World War and he entered the Royal Navy in 1942. He served on HMS Uganda, where he helped support the landing in Sicily and at Salerno. In 1944, he became a cypher officer and was put in charge of shore bases during the Normandy landings. After serving in the Far East he was demobilised in 1946. Mingay married in 1945.

== Academic career ==
After the war, Mingay worked for the Kent Education Department and studied part-time at Chatham Technical College. In 1949, he entered the University of Nottingham and was regarded by Professor J. D. Chambers as a hard-working and talented student. Chambers, who became Mingay's mentor, encouraged him to study agrarian history and his BA dissertation was an examination of the estates of the Duke of Kingston. He was awarded a BA first class degree in 1952 and the external examiner, H. J. Habakkuk, said Mingay's dissertation could have earned him a B.Litt. at Oxford University.

Mingay was awarded a teaching certificate with distinction and taught at Bolton School during 1952–53 and at Woolwich Polytechnic from 1953 until 1957. His doctoral dissertation, Land Ownership and Agrarian Change in the Eighteenth Century, was completed in 1958 and led to his first major published work, The English Landed Society in the Eighteenth Century (1963).

Mingay was appointed Chair of Agrarian History at the University of Kent in 1968. He edited the Agricultural History Review from part 2 of 1972 to part 2 of 1983. He also edited the sixth volume of The Agrarian History of England and Wales, which was published in 1989.

== Works ==
- The English Landed Society in the Eighteenth Century (London: Routledge and Kegan Paul, 1963).
- (with J. D. Chambers) The Agricultural Revolution, 1730-1880 (London: Batsford, 1965).
- Enclosure and the Small Farmer in the Age of the Industrial Revolution (London: Macmillan, 1968).
- (with P. S. Bagwell) Britain and America, 1850–1939 (London: Routledge & Kegan Paul, 1971).
- Georgian London (London: Batsford, 1975).
- The Gentry: The Rise and Fall of a Ruling Class (London: Longman, 1976).
- Rural Life in Victorian England (London: Heinemann, 1977).
- The Transformation of Britain 1830–1939 (London: Routledge & Kegan Paul, 1987).
- A Social History of the English Countryside (London: Routledge & Kegan Paul, 1990).
- Land and Society in England, 1750–1980 (London: Longman, 1994).
- Parliamentary Enclosure in England (London: Longman, 1997).
