= Barbara Hammond =

British social historian (1873–1961)

- Chalk portrait by William Rothenstein in 1908 "intensely penetrating blue eyes and ... beautifully abundant, copper-red hair"
- Born: Lucy Barbara Bradby; 25 July 1873
- Died: 16 November 1961 (aged 88); St Paul's Hospital, Hemel Hempstead,
- Education: St Leonards School; Lady Margaret Hall, Oxford
- Occupation: social historian
- Organization: Women's Industrial Council
- Known for: The Labourer trilogy

Lucy Barbara Hammond (née Bradby, 1873–1961) was an English social historian who researched and wrote many influential books with her husband, John Lawrence Hammond, including the Labourer trilogy about the impact of enclosure and the Industrial Revolution upon the lives of workers.

== Early life and education ==
Born on 25 July 1873, she was the seventh child of Edward Bradby, who was a master at Harrow and headmaster of Haileybury College. In 1885, her father retired from Haileybury and moved to the new charitable settlement of Toynbee Hall in London's East End, with the family residing at St Katharine Docks – a significant change from Barbara's rural upbringing but which she took in her stride. She was then sent to the progressive new boarding school of St Leonards in Scotland, which was pioneering academic education for girls.

In 1892, she won a scholarship to Lady Margaret Hall, Oxford, following her sister Dorothy. She was the first woman student at Oxford to use a bicycle and was also head of the college's boat club, captain of the hockey team and a tennis champion. She further distinguished herself by being the first woman to take a double-first in Classical Moderations and Greats – a set of examinations renowned for their difficulty. This feat inspired a limerick:

In spite of long hours with a crammer,
I never get more than a Gamma,
But the girl over there
With the flaming red hair
Gets Alpha Plus every time, damn her!

== Marriage and writing ==
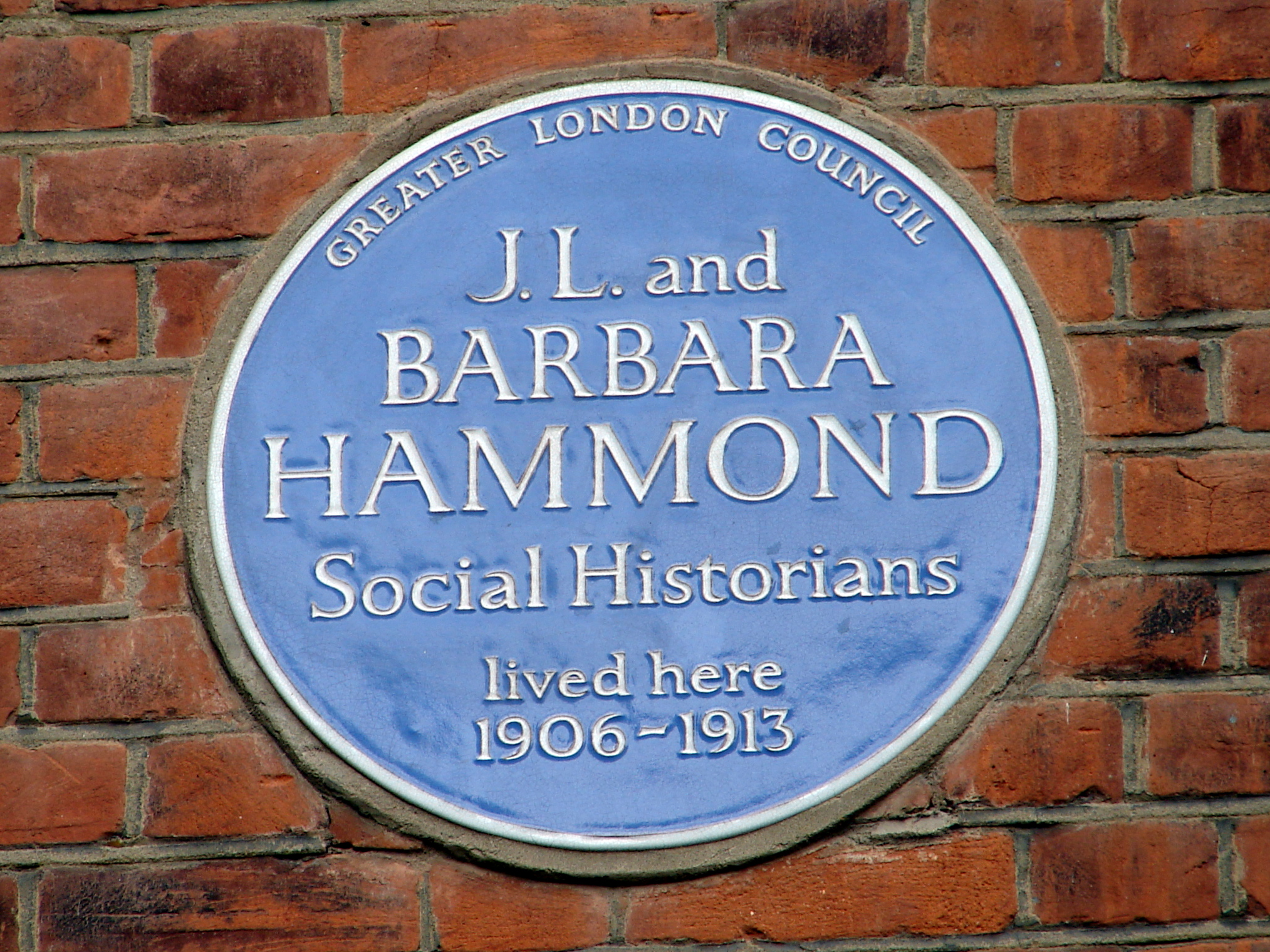
The blue plaque at the Vale of Health in Hampstead Heath

Photographed by Howard Coster in 1939

At Oxford, she became a fellow of Lady Margaret Hall. There, she had met John Lawrence Hammond and they married in 1901 after he had established a career in political journalism, becoming the editor of the Liberal weekly review, The Speaker, in 1899. They lived in Battersea and were both active in campaigning against the Boer War. She was also active in the Women's Industrial Council until ovarian tuberculosis forced her to retire and also prevented her from having children.

The couple moved to Hampstead Heath in 1905 for the sake of her health, which was now delicate. In 1907, John became secretary of the Civil Service Commission, and this position gave him sufficient time to write books too. They worked together on these, with Barbara focussing on the research while John concentrated on the writing. While she had done better academically at Oxford, she told her husband John that "she hated using her brains". He wrote that her strength was "putting great masses of fact & detail in order, seizing their significance & seeing how they should be set out". Their first work together was a study of the effects of enclosure and the Industrial Revolution upon the working classes. When taken to the publishers, Longmans, this was found to be too long and so Barbara restructured the work into separate volumes. The first of these was The Village Labourer which was published in 1911. This was well-received and had an immediate political impact, informing Liberal policy produced by the Land Enquiry Committee of David Lloyd George – a driver of the Liberal welfare reforms.

In 1912, they moved again to a farmhouse named Oatfield in the rustic village of Piccotts End, which was to be their home for most of their lives. Barbara would work here while tending the large garden and collection of animals. Their friend, the historian Arnold J. Toynbee, recounted her spartan, therapeutic lifestyle which emphasised fresh air – open windows, long walks, riding and outdoor sleeping. She would make occasional trips to the Public Record Office for research while John spent more time in London for his job. During the Second World War he worked at the Manchester Guardian, and so they moved to Manchester for the duration, but they returned to Piccotts End in 1945. John died there in 1949. Barbara died in 1961.

== Publications ==
- The Village Labourer 1760–1832: a Study of the Government of England before the Reform Bill (1911)
- The Town Labourer 1760–1832: The New Civilisation (1917)
- The Skilled Labourer 1760–1832 (1919)
- William Lovett, 1800–1877 (1922)
- Lord Shaftesbury (1923)
- The Rise of Modern Industry (London: Methuen & Co. 1925)
- The Age of the Chartists 1832–1854: A Study of Discontent (1930)
- James Stansfeld: A Victorian Champion of Sex Equality (1932)
- The Bleak Age: England 1800–1850 (1934)
