= G. F. Bradby =

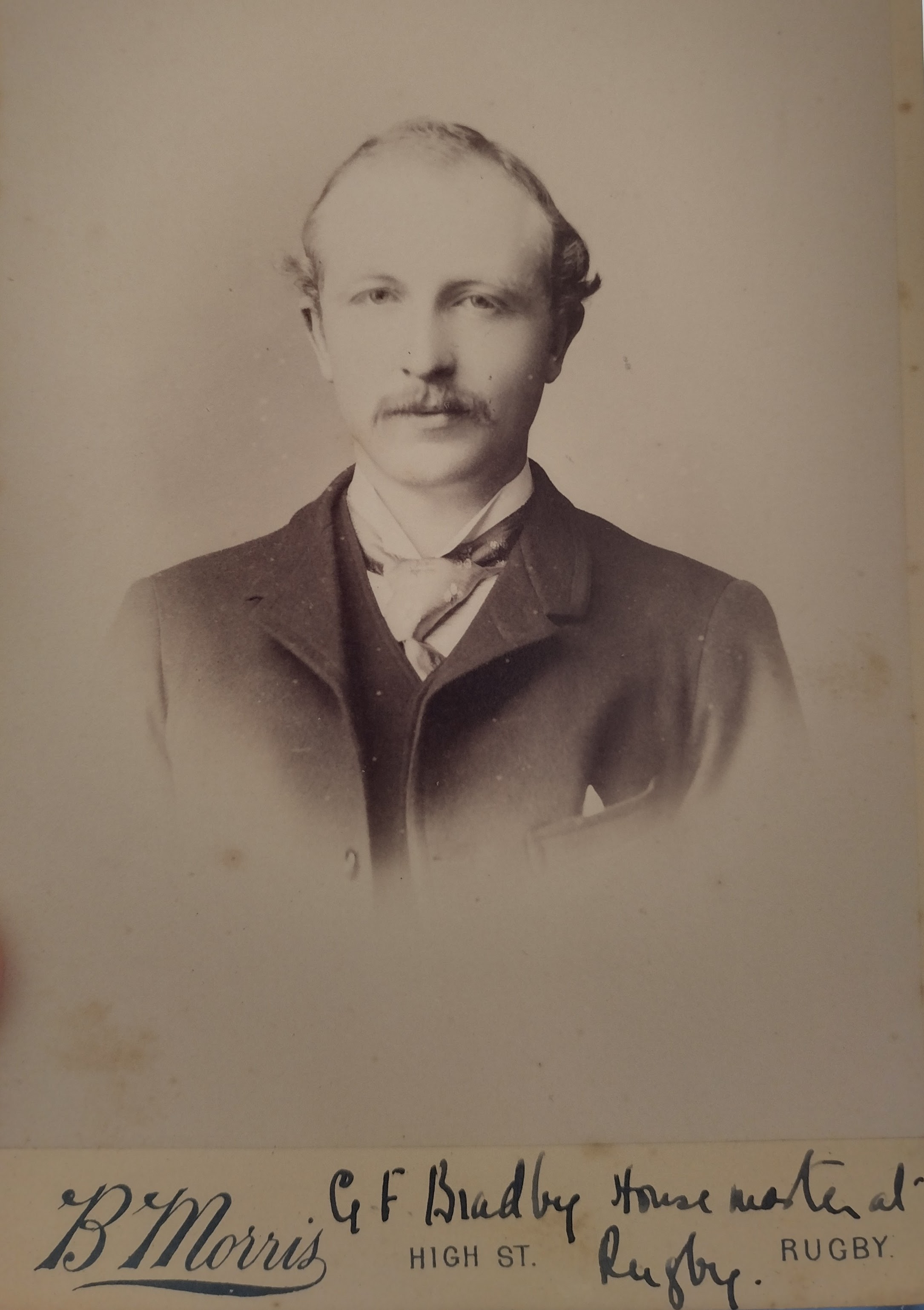
Godfrey Fox Bradby

Godfrey Fox Bradby (1863–1947) was a schoolmaster at Rugby School, who also had a wide-ranging literary career. He wrote poems, novels, literary criticism and hymns.

== Life and career ==
Born 1863, the son of Revd. Edward Henry Bradby (1826–1893) and his wife, Ellen Johnson (1836–1918). He grew up at Haileybury College, where his father was headmaster. He attended Rugby School and Balliol College, Oxford. At Oxford he gained a First in Classical Moderations in 1884 and a Second in Literis Humanioribus (as the degree title then was) in 1886. From 1887 until his retirement in 1920, he taught at Rugby.

== Books ==
Notable among his books are:

- Some Verses (1902) (Contains poems highly critical of Britain's actions in the Second Boer War.)
- The Marquis's Eye (1905) (A fantasy about a virtuous young Englishmen in need of an eye transplant. He is given the eye of an arrogant French Marquis. Farcical complications ensue when he begins to see life through the Frenchman's eye. The book includes satire on British enthusiasm for the Boer War.)
- Dick. A story without a plot (1906) (A novel about a boy whose high spirits get him into trouble.)
- The Great Days of Versailles : studies from court life in the later years of Louis XIV (1906)
- The Lanchester Tradition (1913)(A satirical novel set in a public school, about the conflict between a reforming headmaster and the teachers who resist his changes.)
- For This I Had Borne Him. (1915) (A novel taking the hero of Dick to the First World War.)
- About Shakespeare and his plays (1926)
- The Problems of Hamlet (1928)
- About English Poetry (1929)
- Through the Christian Year : poems old and new (1933)
