= Unearned increment =

Unearned increment is an increase in the value of land or any property without expenditure of any kind on the part of the proprietor; it is an early statement of the notion of unearned income. It was coined by John Stuart Mill, who proposed taxing it so that it benefits every member of a society.

== History ==
Mill's concept was refined and developed by nineteenth-century economist Henry George in his book Progress and Poverty (1879). George argued that the value of land increased as population growth expanded the division of labor. A landowner's exclusive claim to their land granted them the ability to collect the excess productivity as economic rent. Thorstein Veblen further developed the concept, pointing out that the value of a piece of land was also dependent on current technological capabilities.

Veblen thought the unearned increment increased as the industrial arts advanced, so the argument could be extended from land to capital goods. Focusing on the role of technical knowledge in the creation and operation of capital, Veblen argues the unearned increment in the case of capital is in the monopolization of the community's knowledge. As industrial methods advance and the unit of industrial equipment grows larger, it becomes feasible to monopolize the required materials for earning a living, effectively monopolizing a portion of the community's knowledge.

For both George and Veblen, the unearned increment emerges from the actions of an individual with the ability to exclusively use a community asset in order to generate profit. The profit takes the form of an unearned increment because the individual reaping the profit didn't create the land (or knowledge) used to do so. Both thinkers also argued that such monopolization of the community's resources would lead to the creation of economic slavery.

== See also ==
- Capital gain
- Increment Value Duty
- Increment of Association in Social credit
- Land Value Tax
