= Tithe commutation =

Process exchanging tithes for other payment forms in Britain and Ireland

Tithe commutation was a 19th-century reform of land tenure in Great Britain and Ireland, which implemented an exchange of the payment of a tithe to the clergy of the established church, which were traditionally paid in kind, to a system based in an annual cash payment, or once-and-for-all payment. The system had become complex, with lay owners by impropriation entitled to some tithes, which were of a number of kinds.

== History ==
In Scotland, a form of commutation of teinds applied from 1633. A full reform was carried out in the 1930s.

Commutation of tithes occurred in England before the 19th century major reform, since it was an aspect of enclosure, a legal process under which rights to common land were modified by an act of parliament. An estimate places 60% of enclosure acts as involving tithe commutation. In such cases, commissioners who dealt with the detail of enclosure acts handled tithes by allocation of land, as part of the division of ownership. By this mechanism, in the period between 1750 and 1830, the glebe land increased, and clerics in some places became active farmers.

From the 17th century, tithe commutation became seen as part of agricultural improvement, and by the later 18th century, tithes were seen as a major obstacle to improvement, for example by Adam Smith. and the Board of Agriculture.

In England and Wales, existing tithe payments were abolished by the Tithe Commutation Act 1836. It introduced in their place a cash payment, the "corn rent". The legislation was shaped by the parliamentary contribution of William Blamire, a farmer and self-styled "practical man" who became a tithe commissioner.

== Tithe maps ==
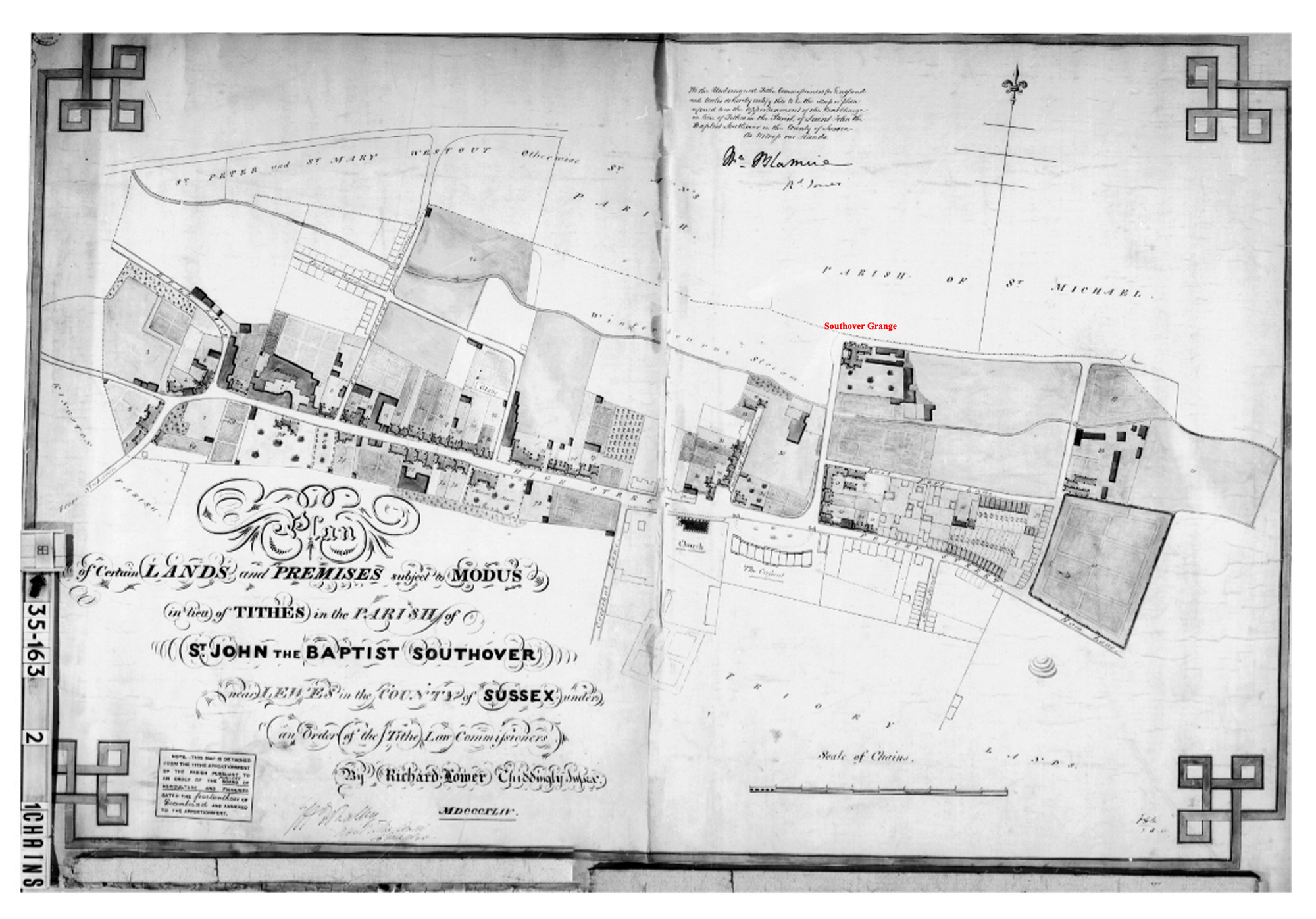
The tithe map of Southover, circa 1840

Implementation of the Commutation Act for England and Wales required detailed maps. Robert Kearsley Dawson took the opportunity to press for a substantive cadastral survey.
