= Passive income =

Income that requires little to no effort to earn and maintain

Passive income is a type of unearned income that is acquired with little to no labor to earn or maintain. It is often combined with another source of income, such as regular employment or a side job. Passive income, as an acquired or earned income, is typically taxable.

The most popular form of passive income is investing in a stock market index fund. Other examples of passive income include rental income and business activities in which the earner does not materially participate. Passive income can come in the form of a lump sum payment, like an inheritance or proceeds from the sale of an asset such as a home or stock. It can also be paid out over time, though not necessarily at a regular amount. Some passive incomes may last for several years, or even centuries, across generations. These typically involve appreciating asset classes, such as property, dividends, or debt.

It can take a long period of work and accumulation before passive income can be acquired. Passive income can be a way of creating financial independence and early retirement, because the beneficiary will receive an income regardless of whether they are materially active in the activity creating the revenue.

Passive incomes can be used as a tax avoidance scheme. Some jurisdictions' taxing authorities, such as the Internal Revenue Service in the United States, distinguish passive income from other forms of income, such as income from regular or contractual employment, and may tax it differently. Generally speaking, high-income groups have more diversified sources of revenue and are more able to hide particular sources, and hiding active income as passive income can lead to a lower tax bill. This loophole has resulted in a large amount of passive income such as income from property transfer and property leasing, and even "earned income" such as income from non-regularly occurring labor remuneration, which is sometimes taxed at a lower rate. As a result, critics say that the personal income tax has been degraded to a "wage tax" aimed at exploited middle income working class.

== Types of income ==
Passive income is often derived from work that one does not personally do. Stock-based dividends, for example, are typically based on regular business operations by real employees who are paid a salary for real work. But these dividends still serve as a passive income for stockholders, as the stockholder has done no physical work for this income. Rental income, on the other hand, does require physical labor in the form of managerial and custodial duties, but these can also be outsourced for minimum wage. This can allow the owner to receive a passive profit from their property, if renters are willing to pay more than the cost of upkeep and tax.

Active income, on the other hand, is earned income including all taxable income and wages the earner receives for working. Active income includes wages, self-employment income, and material participation in an S corporation or partnership. In other words, active income refers to income earned by performing a service or some kind of work. Income from business is considered active in case that the owner satisfies the requirements for material participation (which is based on many factors, mainly on hours worked).

Portfolio income is derived from investments such as dividends, interest, capital gains, and some royalties.

Leveraged income is labor invested in a product that can be sold indefinitely in the future, e.g., writing a e-book or producing a video. This is sometimes called passive income, although the process of creating the product requires substantial work.

Types of income are defined differently among the states and countries and can be taxed differently, depending on the law at the time. For example, portfolio income is often taxed at lower rates than active income in the USA.

== Sources ==
There are various sources of passive income, each with its own advantages and disadvantages. Different options for diversifying portfolio exist.

=== Deposits ===
One of the most common ways to generate passive income is to keep a set amount of money in the bank account. Each period the interest on savings will be accrued, with the interest rate established in the corresponding deposit product.

Certificate of deposits, or CDs, are one of the popular financial products sold by depository institutions, including banks. In a CD, a depositor agrees to hold a fixed amount of money for a fixed period of time. CDs generally offer higher interest rates than savings accounts which makes them more appealing to potential investors, but they typically do not allow for early withdrawals except with a fee. A larger principal and a longer term may allow clients to receive a higher interest rate.

Bank deposits can be a good choice for those who prioritize safety and stability. They may not be the most lucrative sources of passive income, however, they are generally considered to be low-risk options of investment.

=== Stocks ===
Stock shares are arguably the main financial instrument for those who are planning to build wealth by forming passive income. Shares allow to obtain income through value growth that reflects an increase in the market capitalization of the issuer’s company along with dividend payments that are part of the distributed profit among shareholders.

Investing in stocks is generally considered to be a risky passive income stream as stock prices can be volatile and fluctuate rapidly in response to changes in the market. Value stocks, for instance, have high financial leverages and face substantial uncertainty in future earnings. Potential of higher returns can attract risk-tolerant individuals who are looking for supplemental income.

=== Bonds ===
Bonds represent the debts of issuers that are divided and sold to investors in smaller units. In other words, it is a loan made by an investor to a borrower (municipalities, governments, companies, etc.). A bond typically consists of the following components: an issue price, a face value, a coupon rate, a coupon date, a maturity date. The bondholder receives the interest payment, determined by the coupon rate, at the end of each fixed period, set by the coupon date, from the date of issue. When the bond matures, the issuer pays the bondholder the face value.

Receipt of income in the form of coupon payments is a regular and stable way of building passive income. Bonds, typically, can also be resold by bondholders and repurchased by borrowers. An investor can profit from reselling the bond at a higher price and does not need to wait until it matures. Bonds are arguably the safest financial instruments that can be a source of your passive income. They tend to be less volatile than stocks as they are less responsive to changes in market conditions. Nevertheless, they also pay lower returns. Having a diversified portfolio of both stocks and bonds, thus, is typically advised.

=== Rental income and royalties ===
One of the main categories of passive income. In 1930s, J.A. Hobson introduced the term “improperty” that aimed to define a form of assets’ ownership used for extracting income from other individuals. A tenant’s regular payments to a landlord (rent) and individuals’ or companies’ payments for the usage of one’s assets (royalty) can provide a steady stream of income and has good potential to appreciate in value over time.

The great advantage of the given source is generally higher control over investments in comparison to other forms of passive income. Property owners have direct control over the management and operations of their property. The disadvantage is initial investment cost. Purchasing a rental property is typically more financially costly than, for instance, investing in stocks.

Rental income is generally considered passive income only when it has not turned into an everyday job. Being a landlord of even a single small unit may occasionally require work (e.g., finding tenants or organizing repairs), which may become passive if a leasing agent is hired.

=== Digital products ===
Investment market along with many areas was heavily shaped by modern technologies.

== United States ==
The United States Internal Revenue Service categorizes income as active income, passive income, or portfolio income. It defines passive income as only coming from two sources, or "passive activities": rental activity or "trade or business activities in which you do not materially participate." Other financial and government institutions also recognize it as an income obtained as a result of capital growth or in relation to negative gearing. Passive income is usually taxable.

About 20% of Americans receive passive income each year, mostly from interest on savings and bonds, dividends on stocks, and non-professional rental agreements (such as a homeowner renting a room to a roommate). Of those who have any passive income at all, most receive less than US$5,000 per year.

=== Passive activities ===
In the United States, the IRS divides income into three categories: active income, passive income, and portfolio income.

According to IRS, there are two kinds of passive activities.

- Rental activities, one may even materially participate in them unless he is a real estate professional.
- Trade or business activities in which one does not materially participate during the year.

Portfolio income (interest, dividends, royalties, gains on stocks and bonds) is considered passive income by some analysts. However, the IRS does not generally consider portfolio income as passive. Thus, it would be wise to turn to a tax professional on that subject.

Also, self-charged interest can be included in passive income "if the loan proceeds are used in a passive activity". Self-charged interest income usually refers to loans between you and a partnership or S corporation in which you had a direct or indirect ownership interest at any time during their tax year (this applies for both loans you made to the partnership or S corporation and loans that were made to you).

In some cases, royalties could be put in the category of passive income. Royalties are payments made by one company (the licensee) to another company or person (the licensor) for the right to use the latter's intellectual property (book, music, video) or patent. Beyond traditional royalties, trademarks and software can also be licensed. However, the Internal Revenue Service only considers royalties passive income when they are "not derived in the ordinary course of a trade or business."

=== Rental activities ===
In order to be considered a rental activity, tangible property is used by customers and the gross income from the activity represents amounts paid mainly for the use of the property. Activity isn’t a rental activity if any of the following apply:

- The average period of customer use is:
  - 7 days or less
  - 30 days or less and significant personal services were provided (cleaning of common areas or repairing property do not count as personal services)
- Extraordinary personal services are provided, i.e. they are performed by individuals and the customers' use of the property is incidental in terms of receiving the services
- The rental is incidental to a non-rental activity. In other words, if the main purpose of holding the property is to attain a gain from its appreciation (and also applies the condition that the gross rental income from the property is less than 2% of fair market value).

=== Trade or business activities ===
A trade or business activity is an activity that involves running a trade or business, is conducted in expectation of starting a trade or business or involves research or experimental expenditures.

==== Silent partner ====
Passive income also includes earnings from other business in which a person is not actively involved. An example could be silent partner. A silent partner is an individual who does not have any role in company and whose participation in a partnership is limited to providing capital to the business (that is why they are sometimes called limited partners). A silent partner earns a passive income since he gets an agreed percentage of the gross profits on a regular basis.

== Europe ==
It would be complicated to state one conclusion about the passive income and the taxation of this type of income in Europe. In fact, there is no word defined as "passive income" by the European Commission. In addition, the European Union itself has no taxation powers. Every country levies different taxes on activities that are defined above as "passive".

=== The Organisation for Economic Co-operation and Development (OECD) ===
The Common Reporting Standard (CRS) does not define passive income. Each jurisdiction can define the items included in the list of passive income in its own way in accordance with domestic rules. However, the CRS provides a list of items that should generally be considered as passive income and should guide the countries.

Income should be characterized as passive if it contains the portion of gross income that consists of:

- dividends
- interest (or income equivalent to interest)
- rents and royalties (that are not made in the active conduct of a business )
- annuities; the excess of gains over losses from the sale or exchange of Financial Assets
- the excess of gains over losses from transactions in any Financial Assets
- the excess of foreign currency gains over foreign currency losses
- net income from swaps; a swap is a contract between two parties to exchange cashflows or other financial instruments for a certain period.

== China ==
China currently adopts a proportional tax rate of 20% for passive income and unearned income, which does not play the role of regulating the income distribution gap between active income and passive income as some expects argued. Specifically, the relative tax rates on these two incomes, with the former one being subject to a progressive marginal tax rate of up to 45% on larger amounts of income, while the later income, particularly capital gains, is only subject to a proportional tax rate of 20%, which is unfair on a horizontal basis and does not have the effect of regulating excessive income.

== Taxation ==
=== United States' classification based on income source ===
According to the US tax code, it does not specifically define income, but lists the various income items. The basic concept of the US federal personal income tax is the gross income, which is defined by the IRS as all income from any source, except for those excluded by law. There are four types of income depending on the income source:

1. income derived from labor, also known as active income, which is income derived from labor provided by an individual in return for remuneration, or income derived from the conduct of a business. Common types of income from active working include: wages, salaries, tips, bonuses and commissions; income from an active activity in a trade or business; income from the provision of labor; and income from illegal activities.
2. income from capital, also known as passive income, includes investments and the sale, trade or other disposal of invested assets. Common types of non-working income include: interest income; dividend income; income from leasing or royalty-related activities; annuity income; income from partnerships, S corporations etc.; and income from the sale of assets that can generate the five categories of income listed above.
3. income constituted by a transfer from another person. Common types of income derived from transfers from others include: prizes and awards; unemployment compensation; social security benefits; and alimony received.
4. presumptive income. Common presumptive income includes: loans at below-market interest rates; expenses borne by others; and low-cost purchases.

The four categories of income are not designed to differentiate tax rate, but rather to introduce a credit for active work.

=== United States' classification based on the deficit of passive activities ===
In the US tax system, various types of income can be classified under the negative activity loss rules as follows:

- First, portfolio income. Portfolio income includes: income from dividends, interest, royalties, annuities and other assets held as investments; income from the sale of assets that generate portfolio income.
- Second, active income. Active income includes: wages and salaries; other income from transactions or operations in which the taxpayer is substantially involved.
- Third, passive income. Passive income includes income from transactions or operations in which the taxpayer is not actively and fully involved, for example, ordinary rental income. However, the following rental activities are not considered negative activities: hotel rooms, hospital housing, car rentals, video rentals, clothing rentals, golf course fees, tool rentals, car dealerships renting cars, and cable TV rentals. In addition, income from limited partnerships is also considered negative income.

Investment portfolios and passive income are also covered by the personal income tax rules regarding the earned income tax credit.

=== Russia ===
Income earned on an investment is taxable. A tax of 13% will be withheld in the following cases:

- Income earned on sales of securities if the price at which the security was sold was higher than the price at which you initially purchased it.
- Income on coupons from bonds and dividends on shares.
- Income earned on sales of currency and precious metals on the stock exchange if the price at which currency and precious metals were sold was higher than the price at which you initially purchased them.

A tax is calculated in accordance with the following formula = (Assets Sale Amount – Sales Commission – Asset Purchase Amount – Purchase Commission) × 13%. If a stock that you purchased increased in its price and you did not sell it, you do not have to pay taxes as there is no actual income. If a stock that you purchased lost its value and your total investment for the year resulted in loss, you do not have to pay taxes for that year.

Non-residents who receive dividends from Russian companies have to pay a tax of 15%.

=== Kazakhstan ===
Income earned in the form of dividends is subject to income tax at the rate of 5%. Calculations, withholding and payment of tax are made by tax agents. In accordance with the Tax Code (Article 341, paragraph 1.7 and paragraph 1.16), the following cases are excluded from the taxable ‘passive’ income:

- Dividends on securities that were included in the official list of stock exchanges operating on the territory of the Republic of Kazakhstan at the moment of the accrual of such dividends.
- Income earned on increase in value of securities that were included in the official list of stock exchanges operating on the territory of the Republic of Kazakhstan on the day of sale.

The benefits apply only to assets issued by Kazakhstani companies. Foreign companies will be subjects of a different taxation scheme.

== See also ==
- Cash flow
- Capital gains
- Economic rent
- Profit
- Property income
- Rent seeking
- Surplus value
- Unearned income
- Net income
