= Tithe Act 1836 =

Act of the Parliament of the United Kingdom

Tithe Act 1836 (Note: The citation of this act by this short title was authorised by section 1 of, and the first schedule to, the Short Titles Act 1896. Due to the repeal of those provisions it is now authorised by section 19(2) of the Interpretation Act 1978.)
- Act of Parliament
- Parliament of the United Kingdom
- Long title: An Act for the Commutation of Tithes in England and Wales.
- Citation: 6 & 7 Will. 4. c. 71
- Territorial extent: England and Wales (Note: Section 96.)

Dates
- Royal assent: 13 August 1836
- Commencement: 13 August 1836 (Note: The Acts of Parliament (Commencement) Act 1793.)
Other legislation
Amended by	Tithe Act 1837; Tithe Act 1839; Tithe Act 1840; Tithe Act 1842; Tithe Act 1846; Tithe Act 1847; Tithe Act 1860; Statute Law Revision Act 1874; Tithe Act 1878; Corn Returns Act 1882; Statute Law Revision (No. 2) Act 1888; Board of Agriculture Act 1889; Statute Law Revision Act 1890; Tithe Act 1891; Statute Law Revision Act 1893; Public Authorities Protection Act 1893; Perjury Act 1911; Tithe Act 1918; Tithe Act 1936; Statute Law Revision Act 1948; Tithe Act 1951; Statute Law Revision Act 1953; Ecclesiastical Fees Measure 1962; Local Government Act 1966; Statute Law (Repeals) Act 1998

Status: Partially repealed

Text of statute as originally enacted

Revised text of statute as amended

Text of the Tithe Act 1836 as in force today (including any amendments) within the United Kingdom, from legislation.gov.uk.

The Tithe Act 1836 (6 & 7 Will. 4. c. 71), sometimes called the Tithe Commutation Act 1836, is an act of the Parliament of the United Kingdom. It is one of the Tithe Acts 1836 to 1891. It replaced the ancient system of payment of tithes in kind with monetary payments. It is especially noted for the tithe maps which were needed for the valuation process required by the act. British Parliamentary Paper 1837 XLI 405 was published to give guidance on how landscape features were to be indicated on the maps. It is entitled ′Conventional signs to be used in the plans made under the Act for the Commutation of Tithes in England and Wales′

== Tithe payments ==
Tithes were originally paid as one-tenth of the produce of the land (crops, eggs, cattle, timber, fishing, etc.) to the rector, as alms and as payment for his services. The tithes were often stored in a tithe barn attached to the parish. At the dissolution of the monasteries some of the land passed out of church ownership, and the tithes were then paid to private landlords. Inclosure acts made further modifications, either abolishing tithe payments entirely or replacing them with monetary payments. Various other arrangements also replaced payments in kind, but not systematically.

By the time of the Tithe Commutation Act there was considerable discontent over payment of tithes, most notably in the Tithe War of 1831-1836 in Ireland; in England a dispute over tithes in 1806 led to a double murder in Oddingley, Worcestershire.

== Provisions ==
The act substituted a variable monetary payment (referred to as the "corn rent") for any existing tithe in kind. This payment was originally calculated on the basis of seven-year average prices of wheat, barley, and oats, with each type of grain contributing an equal part to the total. Prices were determined nationally. Parcels of land for which tithes had already been commuted were unaffected, as initially were Ireland and Scotland. Some land was free of tithe obligation, due to barrenness, custom, or prior arrangement.

A commission was established to identify all affected properties and to resolve boundary issues arising from the survey. It was headed by three commissioners:

- William Blamire (chairman)
- Thomas Wentworth Buller
- Rev. Richard Jones

Valuation of current tithes could be negotiated by the parties; in the absence of an agreement, they were determined by the commission.

== Execution of the act ==
As the commission's first step was to identify affected properties, a set of surveys was made to produce maps in areas affected by the act. The initial intent was to produce maps of the highest possible quality, but the expense (incurred by the landowners) led to the provision that the accuracy of the maps would be testified by the seal of the commissioners, and only maps of suitable quality would be so sealed. In the end, about one-sixth of the maps had seals. A map was produced for each "tithe district", that is, an area in which tithes were paid as a unit. These were often distinct from parishes or townships. Areas in which tithes had already been commuted were not mapped, so that coverage varied widely from county to county. The maps indicated parcels of land and buildings, assigning each a number.

Associated with each map was an apportionment schedule, which listed each map item by number. For each entry the owner, tenant, area, name or description, state of cultivation, rent charge payable, and the tithe owner was listed. A preamble gave the name of the tithe owner, the circumstances under which tithes were owed, and whether the apportionment was agreed by the parties or was being imposed by the Crown.

The surveying was carried out expeditiously, with the majority of the work performed by 1841, and largely completed by 1851. In some cases amendments had to be filed when properties were divided or other circumstances intervened. The work was also complicated by numerous inconsistencies in how tithes were assessed. For example, timber might or might not include standing trees, branches, acorns, mast, and even charcoal. Variations as to the circumstances of tithe-paying were also considerable.

Three copies of each map and apportionment were made. The original document was kept by the commissioners (and is now held by The National Archives); the other two copies were deposited with the local diocesan registrar and the parish (many of the latter copies have been transferred to local archives.) These maps and apportionments are often used for reference by genealogists and other historical researchers.

== Subsequent developments ==
Section 94 of the act was repealed by section 2 of, and the schedule to, the Public Authorities Protection Act 1893 (56 & 57 Vict. c. 61), which came into force on 1 January 1894.

The following provisions were repealed by section 1 of, and the first schedule to, the Statute Law Revision Act 1953 (2 & 3 Eliz. 2. c. 5), which came into force on 18 December 1953.

- Section 3.
- Section 10.
- Sections 13–16.
- Section 29, so far as unrepealed.
- Sections 30 and 31.
- Section 57, so far as unrepealed.
- Section 62, so far as unrepealed.
- Section 67, so far as unrepealed.
- Section 68.
- Section 93, so far as unrepealed.

Section 69 of the act was repealed by section 43(2) of, and part III of schedule 6 to, the Local Government Act 1966, which came into force on 1 April 1967.

The whole act, except sections 12, 64 and 96, was repealed by section 1(1) of, and group 2 of part II of schedule 1 to, the Statute Law (Repeals) Act 1998, which came into force on 19 November 1998.

== Bibliography ==
- Alan Wharham, "Tithes in Country Life," History Today (June 1972), Vol. 22 Issue 6, pp 426–433.
- "Tithe Records: Domestic Information Research Guide 41". The National Archives of the United Kingdom.
- "The Tithe Commutation Act 1836". National Library of Wales.
- Clark, Robert (14 July 2004). "Tithes (1000-1880)". The Literary Encyclopedia.
- Prince, H. C. "The Tithe Surveys of the Mid-Nineteenth Century" (PDF). The Agricultural History Review. British Agricultural History Society.
- John Meadows White. The Act for the Commutation of Tithes in England and Wales. B Fellowes. Ludgate Street, London. 1836. Google Books
- Ralph Barnes. Remarks on the Tithe Commutation Act. J G and T Rivington. London. 1836. Google Books
- G H Whalley. The Tithe Act, and the Tithe Amendment Act. Shaw and Sons. Fetter Lane, London. 1838. Google Books
- John Meadows White. The Acts for the Commutation of Tithes in England and Wales. New Edition. B Fellowes. Ludgate Street, London. 1838. Google Books
- George Burges. A Commentary on the Act for the Commutation of Tithes in England and Wales. J G and F Rivington. London. Matchett, Stevenson and Matchett. Norwich. 1838. Google Books
- William Eagle. The Acts for the Commutation of Tithes in England and Wales. Third Edition. Saunders and Benning. Fleet Street, London. 1840. Google Books
- Leonard Shelford. The Acts for the Commutation of Tithes in England and Wales. Third Edition. S Sweet. Stevens and Norton. London. 1842. Google Books
- George Pemberton Leach. "The Tithe Act, 1836". The Tithe Acts. Fifth Edition. 1891. Pages 1 to 36. Sixth Edition. 1896. Pages 1 to 40.
- Eric J Evans. Tithes and the Tithe Commutation Act 1836. Bedford Square Press. 1978. Google Books
- J M Lely. "Tithe Commutation Act, 1836". Chitty's Collection of Statutes of Practical Utility. Fourth Edition. 1880. Volume 6. Title "Tithes". Pages 559 to 588.
- J M Lely. "Tithe Act, 1836". The Statutes of Practical Utility. (Chitty's Statutes). Fifth Edition. 1895. Volume 12. Title "Tithes". 1 to 15.
- "Tithe Act 1836". Halsbury's Statutes of England. Third Edition. Butterworths. London. 1971. Title "Tithe". Volume 35. Page 390.
