= First-mover advantage =

Business advantage

In marketing strategy, first-mover advantage (FMA) is the competitive advantage gained by the initial ("first-moving") significant occupant of a market segment. First-mover advantage enables a company or firm to establish strong brand recognition, customer loyalty, and early purchase of resources before other competitors enter the market segment.

First movers in a specific industry are almost always followed by competitors that attempt to capitalise on the first movers' success. These followers are also aiming to gain market share; however, most of the time the first-movers will already have an established market share, with a loyal customer base that allows them to maintain their market share.

== Mechanisms leading to first-mover advantages ==
The three primary sources of a first-mover advantage are technology leadership, control of resources, and buyer switching costs.

=== Technology leadership ===
First movers can make their technology/product/services harder for later entrants to replicate. For example, if the first mover reduces the costs of producing a product, then they will establish an absolute cost advantage, not just a marginal cost advantage. Not only this, but the first mover will be able to apply for patents, copyrights, and any other protective advantages that will further enhance their establishment in the market.

Another way technology leadership comes into play is when a firm has had a unique breakthrough in its research and development (R&D), providing sustainable cost advantage if the innovative idea can be sustained and protected. It must be taken into consideration that technological changes are happening at an incredibly rapid pace. Therefore, patents are a weak protection as the transitory value is low. With the short lifetime of any technological advantage, patent-races can actually prove to be the downfall of a slower moving first-mover firm.

=== Control of resources ===
The second type of first-mover benefit is the ability to control resources necessary for the business that are of a higher quality than resources later entrants will be able to use. An example would be the advantage of being the first company to open a new type of restaurant in town and being able to obtain a prime location. This strategy was used by Walmart when they were the first to locate discount stores in small towns. The first entrant could also control the supply of raw materials needed to make a product, as well as obtaining the ideal supply chain. First-mover firms also have the opportunity to build resources that may discourage entry by other companies. An example of this is increasing production capacity to broaden product lines, therefore deterring following firms to enter and successfully make profits. This strategy is often used by Inditex with their fashion retail supply. When economies of scale are large, first-mover advantages are typically enhanced. The enlarged capacity of the incumbent serves as a commitment to maintain greater output following entry, with the threat of price cuts against late entrants.

=== Buyer switching costs ===
The final type of benefit that first movers may enjoy comes from buyer-switching costs. If it is costly or inconvenient for a customer to switch to a new brand, the first company to gain the customer will have an advantage. Buyers will rationally stick with the first brand they encounter that performs the job adequately. Especially for consumer products, the first mover has the opportunity to shape consumer preferences and to earn customer loyalty. Satisfied consumers tend not to spend time seeking information about other products, and tend to avoid the risk of being dissatisfied if they switch. Some examples of pioneering brands in product categories include Coca-Cola soft drinks, Kleenex tissues, and Nestlé foods. These brands are known to often dominate their markets for a long time. These brand preferences appear to be more important for retail purchases by consumers than for products purchased by businesses, as businesses buy products in larger volume and have more incentive to search for lower-cost options that will contribute to an economy of scale.

== Disadvantages of being a first mover ==
Although being a first-mover can create an overwhelming advantage, in some cases products that are first to market do not succeed. These products are victims of first-mover disadvantages.

== General conceptual issues ==
=== Endogeneity and exogeneity of first-mover opportunities ===
First-mover advantages are typically the result of two things: technical proficiency (endogenic) and luck (exogenic).

Technical proficiency and manufacturing capability can significantly influence a company's ability to sustain a first-mover advantage. A technologically superior product may capture market share more quickly, while a novel product entering an untested market has the potential for substantial growth. Firms with strong technical competencies are often able to produce goods at lower costs than competitors, supporting both pricing strategies and marketing efforts. Procter & Gamble's introduction of the first mass-market disposable diaper serves as a frequently cited example; the company leveraged technical innovation, cost-efficient materials, established manufacturing processes, and existing distribution channels to gain a dominant position in the disposable diaper industry.

Luck can also have a large effect on profits in first-mover-advantage situations, specifically in terms of timing and creativity. Simple examples such as a research "mistake" turning into an incredibly successful product (serendipity), or a factory warehouse being burned to the ground (unlucky), can have an enormous impact in some instances. Initially, Procter and Gamble's lead was aided by its ability to maintain a proprietary learning curve in manufacturing, and by being the first to take over shelf space in stores. Large increases in the birth rate, in the years that Procter and Gamble's first disposable diapers were released, also added to their industry profits and first-mover advantage.

=== Definitional and measurement issues ===
==== What constitutes a first-mover? ====
Much of the problem with the concept of first-mover advantage is that it may be hard to define. Should a first mover advantage apply to firms entering an existing market with technological discontinuity, the calculator replacing the slide rule for example, or should it apply solely be new products? The imprecision of the definition has certainly named undeserving firms as pioneers in certain industries, which has led to some debate over the real concept of first-mover advantage.

Another common argument is whether first-mover advantage constitutes the initiation of research and development versus the entry of a new product into the market. Typically the definition is the latter, since plenty of firms spend millions in research and development that never result in a product entering a market. Many factors affect the answer to these questions; including the sequence of entry; elapsed time since the pioneer's first release; and categorizations such as early follower, late follower, differentiated follower, etc.

==== Alternative measures of first-mover advantage ====
A commonly accepted way of measuring a first-mover advantage is by measuring the pioneering firm's profits as the consequence of its early entry. Such profits is an appropriate measure, since the sole objective of stockholders is to maximize the value of their investment.

Still, some issues have risen with this definition, specifically that dis-aggregate profit data are seldom obtainable. In turn, market shares and rates of company survival are typically used as alternative measures since both are commonly linked to profits. Still these links can be weak and lead to ambiguity. Early entrants always have a natural advantage in market share, which does not always translate to higher profits.

==== Magnitude and duration of first-mover advantages ====
Though the name "first-mover advantage" hints that pioneering firms will remain more profitable than their competitors, this is not always the case. Certainly a pioneering firm will reap the benefits of early profits, but sometimes profits fall close to zero as a patent expires. This commonly leads to the sale of the patent, or exit from the market, which shows that the first-mover is not guaranteed longevity. This commonly accepted fact has led to the concept known as "second-mover advantage".

== Second-mover advantage ==
First-movers are not always able to benefit from being first. Whereas firms who are the first to enter the market with a new product can gain substantial market share due to lack of competition, sometimes their efforts fail. Second-mover advantage occurs when a firm following the lead of the first-mover is actually able to capture greater market share, despite having entered late.

First-mover firms often face high research and development costs, and the marketing costs necessary to educate the public about a new type of product. A second-mover firm can learn from the experiences of the first mover firm, and will spend less on R&D, spend less on market education, deal with less risk of failure to gain product acceptance and spend less on customer acquisition. As a result, the second-mover can use its resources to focus on making a superior product or out-marketing the first-mover.

The following are a few examples of first-movers whose market share was subsequently eroded by second-movers:

- Atari vs. Nintendo;
- Apple's Newton PDA vs. Palm Pilot PDA;
- Charles Stack Online Bookstore vs. Amazon.com; although the public was largely unaware of Charles Stack Online Bookstore and a compelling argument can be made that Amazon has had much more success than the second-mover BarnesandNoble.com

Second-mover firms are sometimes called "fast followers".

=== Example of second-mover advantage: Amazon.com ===
In 1994, Jeff Bezos founded Amazon.com as an online bookstore and launched the site in 1995. The product lines were quickly expanded to VHS, DVD, CDs, computer software, video games, furniture, toys, and many other items. However, an earlier online bookstore—Book Stacks Unlimited, or books.com—was founded in 1991 by Charles M. Stack, and launched online in 1992. It is considered to be the very first online bookstore; despite this, Bezos and Amazon were more successful due to the concurrent dot-com bubble and prudent marketing strategies. Amazon has since come to dominate the online bookstore business, while Book Stacks was sold to Barnes and Noble in 1996.

== Implications for managers ==
Different studies have produced varying results with respect to whether or not, on the whole, first-mover advantages exist and provide a profitable result for pioneers. There have been two outstanding conclusions that have been accepted. The first being that on average, first-movers tend to produce an unprofitable outcome (Boulding and Moore). Secondly, pioneers that manage to survive do enjoy lasting advantages in their market share (Robinson). Thus, the pioneer strategy is not necessarily a route that just any firm can take, but with the right resources, and the proper marketing approach, it can result in lasting profits for the company.

Managers can make a big difference for a firm when deciding whether or not they should be followers or pioneers. "Good generals make their luck by shaping the odds in their favor" (MacMillan). Making good decisions and acting upon them can help a firm, but in the end there are other factors that must be taken into account before making a final decision. One issue is that a firm must find a way to at least limit, if not prevent, imitation, by, for example, applying for patent(s), creating a product that is too complicated to reverse engineer, or taking control of resources that are important to the production of its product and any imitation. The firm must also remember that first-mover advantages are not everlasting; eventually the competition will manage to take at least some piece of the market. Finally, a company must do its best to prevent incumbent inertia caused by self-righteousness, or possible changes in the market environment. One way to overcome such inertia is by expanding the product line. The advantages of having a wider product line are much easier to maintain compared to those of being a pioneer (Robinson).

Managers who opt to be followers have to pick the right method of attack on the pioneer of the product. Some attempt to go head-to-head against the product, hoping that increased spending in advertisement is enough to counteract the first-mover advantages. This technique has proven successful but usually against smaller pioneers that lack resources and recognition in the market (Urban 1986). Otherwise, this "me-too" strategy proves ineffective since the follower will most likely lack brand name and product awareness. An alternate method is to create an entirely new market segment and distribution channel, to establish a foothold in the industry, and then employ the me-too strategy.

== Issues for future research ==
There are several problems that do arise when one attempts to clearly define "first-mover advantages". These prevent us from entirely accepting that a company gains a clearly defined benefit from being the first to produce and market a particular product. Many studies have been done that try to identify all possible "pioneering advantages" that are available to a first-mover, but the results so far have provided only a basic framework without any clearly defined mechanisms. There is still much more research that can be done to provide future generations of marketing teams with concrete evidence to show that first-mover advantage is well-defined.

=== Theoretical and conceptual issues ===
The biggest issue that arises is that, despite the evidence of first-mover advantages, the fundamental question of how or why these advantages occur is still unanswered. When attempting to discover the answer, it became clear that it was too difficult to differentiate between an actual advantage and just blind luck. Before this research can be completed, crucial management decisions, such as the optimal time to produce and market a product, need to be studied. Ultimately, some firms are more suited to be pioneers; others are more suited to wait and see how the product does and then improve upon it, releasing a slightly modified reproduction.

Research has identified potential advantages for firms that enter a market after first movers. However, the effects of technological and market uncertainty on the optimal timing of product release remain under-studied. Researchers have also not established a generally accepted method for determining when organizational inertia is appropriate.

=== Empirical issues ===
Determining the differences between the advantages of followers and first-movers may be a conceptual issue, but empirical issues revolve around explicit strategies that first-movers employ to improve upon their advantage. New information is needed to support any acceptable theories relating to the mechanisms, advantages, and disadvantages that first-movers are thought to have at their disposal. Researchers in this field must avoid using the same data repeatedly, which is a trend that has crippled the progress of this investigation.

A future study should better delineate the differences between first-mover advantages and other advantages that a firm may have, such as superior manufacturing, or a better marketing scheme. Funding such a study would be extremely useful to any company that has extra money to spend for their next quarter. Furthermore, it would be useful to study how the strength of each advantage varies as it translates from industry to industry. It is quite possible that each industry has its own unique benefits that have yet to be formally documented. An example of one that has, is that first-mover advantages have proven to be much more prevalent in consumer-goods, as opposed to producer-goods industries. Lastly, better knowing the length of time that a first-mover advantage lasts would be vital to any company trying to determine whether or not it should take the chance of being the first to market a particular type of product, and how long the product would be profitable.

== See also ==
- Scoop (term)
- Schumpeterian rent
