= Invest In Our New York Act =

The Invest In Our New York Act was a proposed New York State legislative package of six bills introduced in February 2021. The bills were to increase the personal income tax rate, impose an unearned income surcharge on capital gains, and raise the corporate tax rate. They did not pass in the 2021-2022 NYS budget.

The legislation was backed by a coalition of over 100 different unions, community groups, and grassroots organizations, including the Democratic Socialists of America.

According to a report by the coalition, the new tax code could raise as much as $12 billion to $18 billion. Supporters said that the increased revenue would be spent on jobs, housing, public education, and healthcare. The coalition believed the money would aid the recovery of the state of New York from the economic crisis caused by the COVID-19 pandemic, help close budget deficits, and rebuild New York's budget.
