= Property income =

Income received by virtue of owning property

Property income refers to profit or income received by virtue of owning property. The three forms of property income are rent, received from the ownership of natural resources; interest, received by virtue of owning financial assets; and profit, received from the ownership of capital equipment. As such, property income is a subset of unearned income and is often classified as passive income.

== Economics ==
Property income is nominal revenues minus expenses for variable inputs (labor, purchased materials and services). Property income represents the return for the supply of both physical capital and financial capital.

Capitalist economic systems are usually defined as those systems where the means of production are privately owned through equity, stock, bonds or privately held by a group of owners who bear the risk of investment and production to generate returns.

In Marxian economics and related schools, property income is a portion of the surplus value produced by an economy, where "surplus value" refers to value beyond what is needed for subsistence. As such, income derived through property ownership constitutes a type of "unearned income" on the basis of economic exploitation for the capitalist class that receives and lives off of property income, because its recipients receive property income by virtue of owning property regardless of their contribution to the social product. As such, the existence of property income based on private property forms the basis for the class division in capitalist economies.

One economic perspective is to bring productive property under public ownership so that each citizen would receive a share of the property income in addition to their normal wage or salary (see: Social dividend). This would eliminate class distinctions, reduce economic inequality, and enable greater economic stability.

== See also ==
- Capitalism
- Cash flow
- Earned income
- Economic rent
- Exploitation
- FIRE economy
- Landlord
- Passive income
- Private property
- Profit
- Rentier
- Surplus value
- Unearned income
