= Capital gain =

Profit from a sale of a capital asset

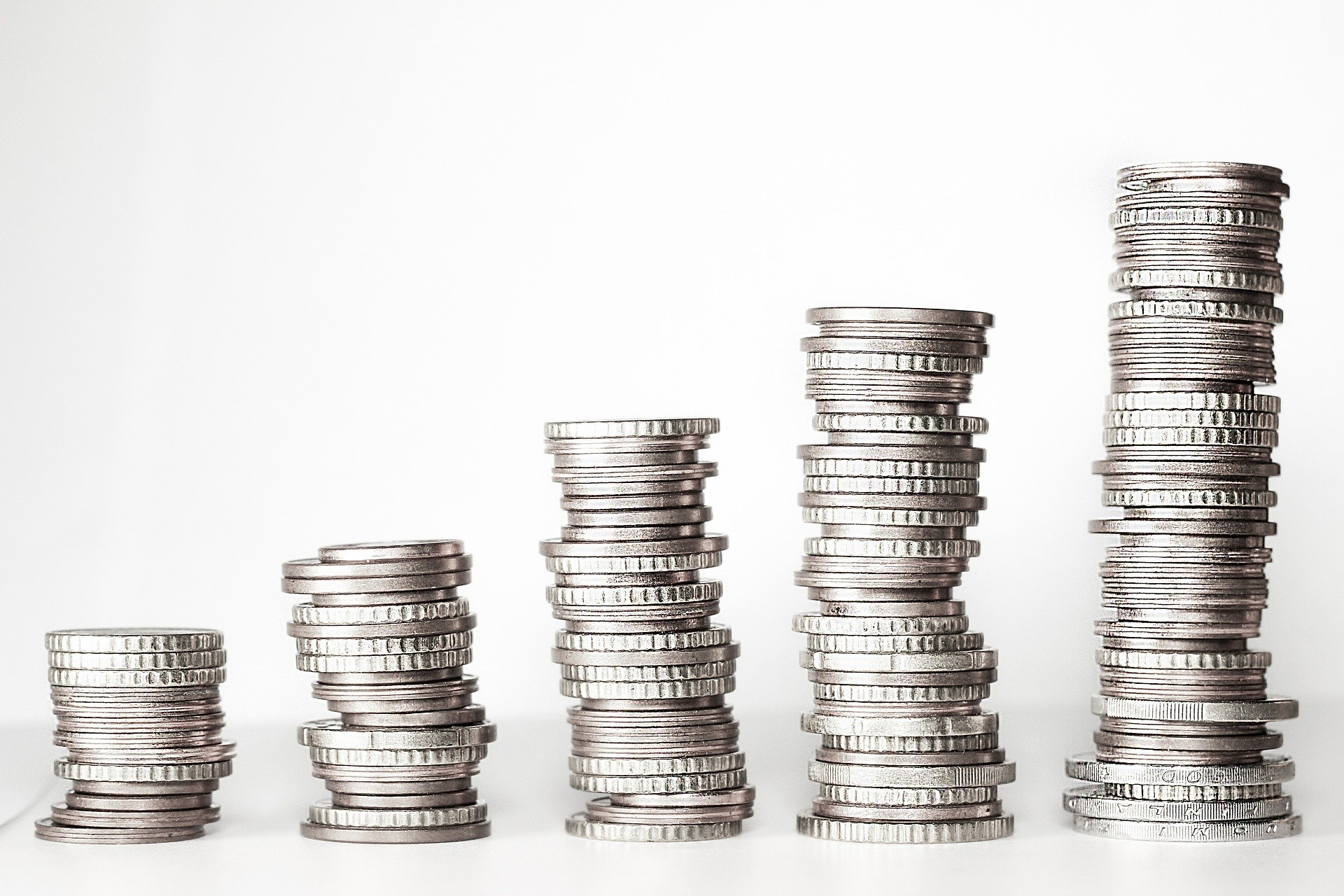
A visual representation of capital gain with coins, as the essential nature of capital gain is accrual of capital

Capital gain is an economic concept defined as the profit earned on the sale of an asset that has increased in value over the holding period. An asset may be tangible property, a car, a business, or intangible property such as shares.

A capital gain is when the selling price of the asset is greater than the original purchase price. In the event that the purchase price exceeds the sale price, a capital loss occurs. Capital gains are often subject to taxation, of which rates and exemptions differ between countries. The history of capital gain originates at the birth of the modern economic system and its evolution has been described as complex and multidimensional by a variety of economic thinkers. The concept of capital gain may be considered comparable with other key economic concepts such as profit and rate of return, however, its distinguishing feature is that individuals, not just businesses, can accrue capital gains through everyday acquisition and disposal of assets.

== History ==
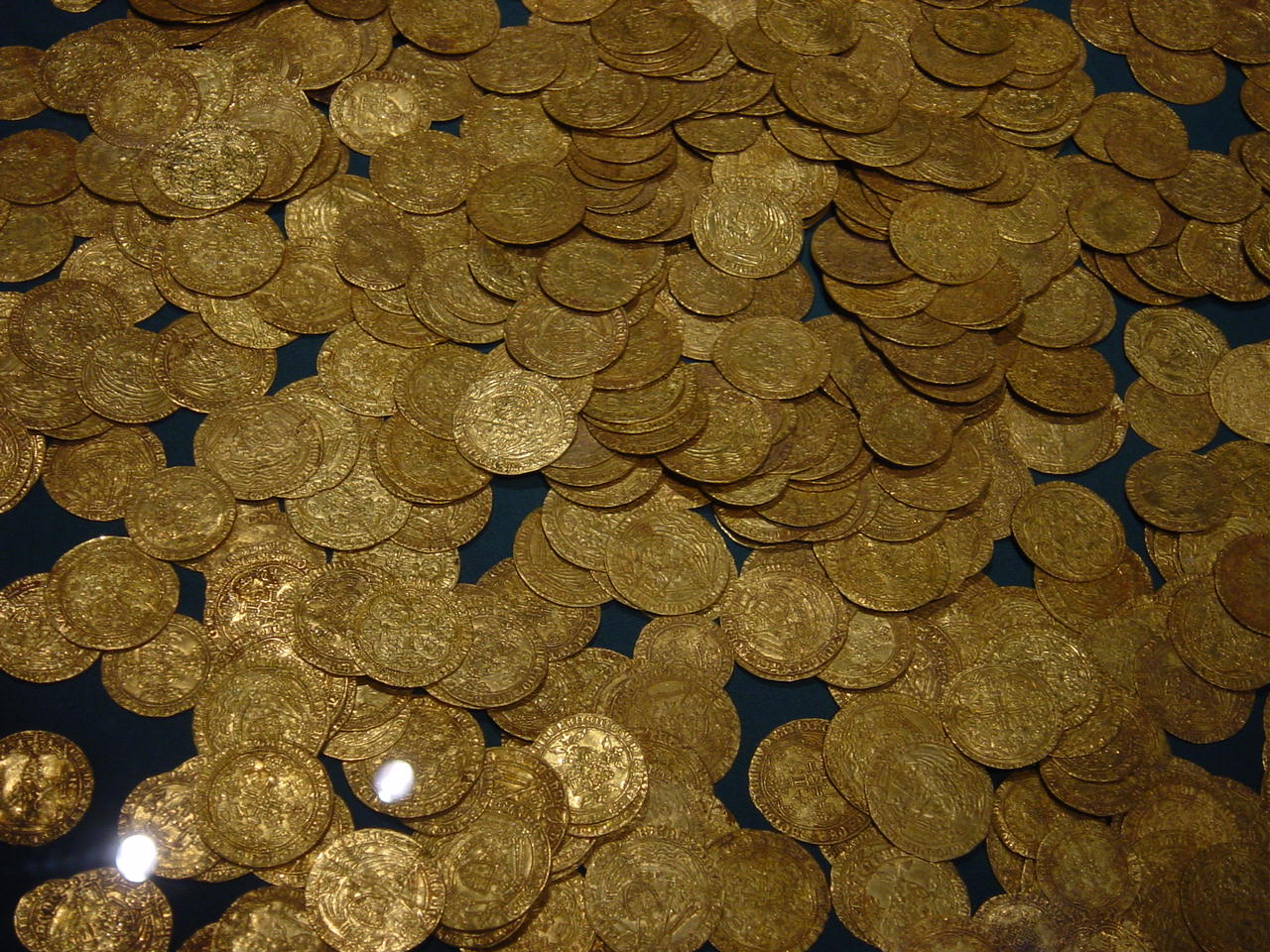
Hoard of ancient gold coins reminiscent of the Babylonian currency

The history of capital gain in human development includes conceptualizations from pre-1865 slave capital in the United States, to the development of property rights in France in 1789, and even other developments much earlier. The official beginning of a practical application of capital gain occurred with the development of the Babylonian's financial system circa 2000 B.C. This system introduced treasuries where citizens could deposit silver and gold for safekeeping, and also transact with other members of the economy. As such, this allowed the Babylonians to calculate costs, sale prices and profits, and hence capital gains.

== Calculation ==
Capital gain is generally calculated by taking the sale price of an asset (capital proceeds) and subtracting its cost base, which includes the purchase price and any incurred expenses. The resulting value is the capital gain, or a capital loss if the result is negative. In practice, many jurisdictions provide supplementary methods for calculation; for instance, the Australian tax system allows eligible taxpayers to choose between the "discount method", the "indexation method", or the "other method" to achieve the most favorable tax outcome.

=== Australia ===
The Australian Taxation Office (ATO) lists three methods of calculating capital gain for Australian citizens and businesses, each one designed to lower the final resulting value of the eligible party's gain. The first is the discount method, whereby eligible individuals or super funds may reduce their stated capital gain value by 50% or 33.33% respectively. The second is the indexation method, which allows individuals and firms to apply an index factor to increase the base cost of the asset, thereby decreasing the final capital gain value. The third is the ‘other’ method, and involves use of the general capital gain formula whereby the base costs of the asset are subtracted from its final sale price.

=== Canada ===
The Canada Revenue Agency (CRA) includes several unique guidelines for calculating individual or business capital gain. The CRA states that individuals may exclude from their capital gains calculation the following types of donations: “shares in the capital stock of a mutual fund corporation… prescribed debt obligations that are not linked notes, ecologically sensitive land… (or) a share, debt obligation, or right listed on a designated stock exchange”. Note that for the exclusion to be approved the donation must be to a qualified donee, and also that capital losses arising from such donations are not eligible to be excluded from an individual's reporting. The CRA states that following a capital gain, individuals may be able to either claim a reserve or claim a capital gains deduction. Individuals are eligible to claim a reserve when the capital gain does not occur as one lump-sum payment but rather a series of payments over time. In order to calculate the reserve, Canadian individuals must calculate their capital gain via the regular sale price minus cost price method, and subsequently subtract the amount of approved reserve for the year. A capital gains deduction is the second form of capital gain calculation which the CRA offers. It is “a deduction that you can claim against taxable capital gains you realized from the disposition of certain capital properties”. Only residents from Canada throughout the previous year are eligible to claim the deduction, and only certain capital gains are eligible for the deduction to be applied.

=== Germany ===
The German tax office levies different capital gains tax based on the asset sold and the holding period. Taxpayers pay a flat 25% capital gains tax (Abgeltungsteuer) on profits from the sale of stocks, plus a solidarity surcharge of 5.5% on the tax amount. If the individual is a church member, church tax is also applied, resulting in a total effective tax rate of 27.82% in Baden-Württemberg and Bavaria, and 27.99% in all other federal states.

Taxes on the sale of real estate differ significantly: gains from private sales are generally tax-free if the property was held for more than ten years. Furthermore, a property can be sold tax-free regardless of the holding period if it was used exclusively for personal residential purposes between acquisition and sale, or in the year of sale and the two preceding years. Otherwise, profits are taxed at the individual's personal income tax rate.

=== Pakistan ===
In Pakistan, capital gains are computed by subtracting the asset’s adjusted cost (including any allowable improvement expenses) from its disposal proceeds under the Income Tax Ordinance, 2001. The tax rate applied depends on the type of asset, its acquisition date, and the holding period. For example, listed securities acquired on or after 1 July 2024 are generally subject to a flat 15% tax. While prior to that, shorter holding periods attracting higher rates and longer holdings sometimes qualifying for reduced rates or exemptions. Likewise, gains on immovable property are taxed on a sliding scale—short-term gains incur higher rates, while those from assets held over a longer period benefit from progressively lower rates or full exemptions.

=== United Kingdom ===
The United Kingdom HM Revenue and Customs (HMRC) office lists certain assets which are eligible to be considered as capital gains. These include “most personal possessions worth £6,000 or more, apart from your car”, property that is not considered your primary dwelling, your main dwelling if it exceeds a certain size or has been used for business, any shares that are not in an individual savings account or personal equity plan, and any business assets. HMRC also lists certain assets which are exempt from accruing capital gains, including any gains made from individual savings accounts or personal equity plans, “UK government gilts and Premium Bonds”, and any winnings from lottery, betting or pools. HMRC states that only gains made above an individual's allowance are eligible to be taxed, and no tax is payable for individuals who accrue gains which are under their Capital Gains Tax allowance. In order to calculate an individual's capital gain, HMRC requires calculation of the gains for each asset in the relevant 12-month period, which are then summed together and finally reduced by the amount of allowable losses deduction. HMRC also states that when reporting a loss, “the amount is deducted from the gains you made in the same tax year”.

=== United States ===
The United States Internal Revenue Service (IRS) also provides guidelines on calculating capital gains. The IRS defines a capital gain or loss as “the difference between the adjusted basis in the asset and the amount you realized from the sale”. Capital gains are also further defined as either short term or long term. Short term capital gains occur when you hold the base asset for less than one year, while long term capital gains occur when the asset is held for over one year. Ownership dates are to be counted from the day after the date which the asset was acquired, through to the day which the asset is sold.

== Taxation of gains ==
There are typically significant differences in the taxation of capital gains earned by individuals and corporations, and the OECD recognizes three simple categories of individual capital income which are taxed by its member nations around the world. These include dividend income, interest income, and capital gains realized through property and shares. The OECD average dividend tax rate is 41.8%, whereby dividends are often taxed at both the corporate and individual level and categorized as corporate income first and personal income second. However, certain countries such as Australia, Chile, Mexico, and New Zealand employ imputation tax systems which allow corporations to redeem imputation credits for tax paid at the corporate level, thus reducing their tax burden. The OECD average interest income tax rate is 27%, and almost all OECD countries excluding Chile, Estonia, Israel, and Mexico tax an individual's total nominal interest income.

== Eligible assets ==
Capital gain can only be earned on the profitable sale of assets. A former Chief Accountant of the Securities Exchange Commission defined an asset as: “Cash, contractual claims to cash or services, and items that can be sold separately for cash”. Practical applications of this definition primarily include stocks and real estate.

=== Stocks ===
A capital gain may be earned through the sale of financial assets such as stocks. When one sells a stock, they would subtract the cost price from the sale price to calculate their capital gain or loss.

==== Disposition effect ====
The disposition effect is a theory which links human psychology to capital gain in stocks and examines how humans make choices under the threat of a potential capital loss. It reveals a pattern of irrationality within human behaviour, in which stocks which have potential to accrue a capital gain are sold too early, while stocks which are clear losers are held on for too long, thus creating greater capital losses than necessary.

==== Expected capital gain asset pricing model ====
This asset pricing model details how the expectations of future capital gains in the stock market are a key driver of actual stock price movements. In general, “asset price boom and bust cycles… are fueled by the belief-updating dynamics of investors”, and thereby the optimism regarding future capital gains in a particular stock will often be the cause of the eventual increase in the stock's price.

==== Lock-in effect ====
The lock-in effect proposes that rather than realize capital gains on stocks, investors should instead revert to short-selling substitute securities. Provided that “tax-exempt perfect substitute securities exist”, investors should never realize their capital gains on stocks because it is possible to reduce the risk from a large position in a stock by “costlessly short selling a perfect substitute”.

=== Real estate ===
A capital gain may be earned through the sale of physical assets such as houses, apartments or land. In most countries however, the sale of a primary dwelling or Primary residence is exempt from capital gains tax. For example, the Australian Taxation Office offers a full exemption of capital gains tax on the sale of a primary home, provided the individual or couple meets certain eligibility criteria.

==== Efficiency in the real estate markets ====
The interlink between psychology and capital gain is also frequently seen in stocks, a concept which is similarly explored by Dusansky & Koç. Since houses are not only consumption but often investment expenditures for families, expectations of capital gains through investing in the house as an asset rather than a consumption good has a strong influence on actual housing prices and demand. As stated by Dusansky & Koç, “an increase in housing prices increases the demand for owner-occupied housing services. Thus, housing’s role as investment asset with its potential for capital gains dominates its role as consumption good”.

=== Bonds ===
A capital gain may be earned through the sale of intangible financial assets such as bonds. The capital gain would be achieved when the selling price of the bond is higher than the cost price, and the capital loss would occur if the selling price of the bond is lower than the cost price.

==== Exemptions ====
Some government departments, such as the Australian Taxation Office (ATO) do not classify gains arising from the profitable sale of a bond as a capital gain. If an individual redeems a bond for more than, or less than, the price they paid for the bond, the ATO states that this profit is “not treated as a capital gain” and that the profit should simply be included in the individual's tax return. Similarly, if an individual sells a bond to another individual for more than, or less than, the price they paid for the bond, the ATO states that “this profit is not treated as a capital gain” and that the profit should simply be included in the individual's tax return. However, the United States Internal Revenue Service (IRS) does consider profits from the redemption or sale of a bond as a capital gain. Bond capital gains are calculated in the same method as other capital gains, whereby “the difference between the adjusted basis in the asset and the amount you realized from the sale is a capital gain or a capital loss”. In Pakistan, assets held for personally use, except from jewelry, artwork, and collectibles, are exempt while calculating capital gains.

== See also ==
- Cash flow
- Investment
- Passive income
- Property income
- Share repurchase
- Unearned income
