= Law of rent =

Economic principle regarding the value of rented land

The law of rent states that the rent of a land site is equal to the economic advantage obtained by using the site in its most productive use, relative to the advantage obtained by using marginal (i.e., the best rent-free) land for the same purpose, given the same inputs of labor and capital.

== Description ==
The law of rent was formulated by David Ricardo around 1809, and presented in its most developed form in his magnum opus, On the Principles of Political Economy and Taxation. This is the origin of the term "Ricardian rent". Ricardo's formulation of the law was the first clear exposition of the source and magnitude of rent.

John Stuart Mill called it the "pons asinorum" of economics.

Ricardo formulated this law based on the principles put forth by Adam Smith in Wealth of Nations.

"The rent of land, therefore, considered as the price paid for the use of the land, is naturally a monopoly price. It is not at all proportioned to what the landlord may have laid out upon the improvement of the land, or to what he can afford to take; but to what the farmer can afford to give." — Adam Smith, An Inquiry into the Nature and Causes of the Wealth of Nations, Book I, Chapter XI "Of the Rent of Land"

Ricardian rent should not be confused with contract rent, which is the "actual payments tenants make for use of the properties of others." (Barlow 1986). Rather, the law of rent refers to the economic return that land should accrue for its use in production.

David Ricardo elaborates on the significance of land on relative prices through his Theory of Rent. The Theory of Rent applies when the individual who possesses the land is distinct from the individual cultivating the land. #1 The producer must pay the landlord for the employment of their land to produce their desired commodity (Ricardo 1911, p. 42).#2 If the land is more productive than other lands, the person renting the land pays more. In contrast, the renter pays a lower price if the land is less sustainable. However, the profit the producer obtains from their production from the land accounts for the price difference in rent (Kishtainy 2018, p. 39).

Ricardo asserts that “corn is not high because a rent is paid, but rent is paid because corn is high” (Ricardo 1911, p. 74). He explains that the price of the land is elevated because the price of the goods produced is high. Inevitably, the landlords are the individuals who benefit from more productive land, not the individuals cultivating the land (Sandmo 2019, p. 76).

Ricardo's theory of rent illustrates the effect of the third factor of production, land, on the prices of goods. Agnar Sandmo, an economist at the Norwegian School of Economics, notions that the Ricardian theory of rent explained the missing 6-7 percent deviation in Ricardo's labor theory of value (Sandmo 2019, p. 77). Ricardo's theory implies that a higher rent does not lead to a higher price because the cultivator requires less effort to cultivate production on more abundant land (Ricardo 1911, p. 44).

Being a political economist, Ricardo was not simply referring to land in terms of soil. He was primarily interested in the economic rent and locational value associated with private appropriation of any natural factor of production. The law of rent applies equally well to urban land and rural land, as it is a fundamental principle of economics.

Ricardo noticed that the bargaining power of laborers can never dip below the produce obtainable on the best available rent-free land, because whenever rent leaves them with less than they could get on that free land, they can simply move to the new location. The produce obtainable on the best available rent-free land is known as the margin of production. Since landlords have a monopoly over a given location, the only limiting factor for rent is the margin of production. Thus, rent is a differential between the productive capacity of the land and the margin of production.

Note that Ricardo's original formulation assumes that the best quality land would be the first to be used in production, and that goods are sold in a competitive, single price market.

In Ricardo's theory of rent, Ricardo supposes that there are different grades of land, all the same size but with different qualities. Land grades 1, 2, and 3. On the Principles of Political Economy, and Taxation, Ricardo supposes that the land generates profits of 100, 90, and 80 units of corn, depending on quality. If there is plenty of land in proportion to the population, farmers only need to cultivate land number 1 (the highest quality), so there will be no rent (100 units of corn). However, as the population increases, it will be necessary to cultivate land number 2. Therefore, land number 1 will have a rent of 10 units. Land number 1 will generate a profit of 100 units of corn, while land number 2 will only generate 90 units of corn. Finally, whenever land number 3 must be cultivated, the rent for land number 1 will be a rent of 20 units, and for land number 2, the rent will be 10. The profit will equal 80 units (profit made by the lowest quality). Eventually, all land is used except for the lowest quality land because workers will not work for a low wage. (Ricardo, 1817). Due to competition, farmers will bid up to 10 units to use the land. As the population grows and lower quality land is cultivated, the rent will be calculated as the profit difference between the low-quality and high-quality land. Farmers who make a low profit are willing to choose between high-quality land and their own (Ricardo,1817).

== See also ==
- Differential and absolute ground rent
- Economic rent
- Georgism
- Henry George
- Iron law of wages
- Rack-rent
- Schumpeterian rent
- Von Thünen rent
