= Increment Value Duty =

Former tax duty in UK

Increment value duty was a UK tax based on The Finance (1909-1910) Act (10 Edw. VII, c.8) - the People's Budget - in response to the unequal ownership of land in the early 20th century. The tax was based on the increase in value of property due to public expenditure on roads, drainage, building of parks, etc. described as unearned increment.

The tax was based on the difference between the amount of two valuations. Section 26(1) of the Act required the Board of Inland Revenue to ascertain the site value of all land in the United Kingdom as on 30 April 1909. This value constituted the "datum line" for the purposes of increment value duty. Any subsequent sale or grant of a lease, or transfer of an interest in a piece of land, or the subsequent death of a land-owner, provided the occasion for a potential payment of increment value duty; the site value at that date had then to be determined. It was repealed by the Finance Act 1920.

A valuable offshoot of this tax and the Act was the 1910-15 Valuation Office maps and field books

Resulting from this, The Valuation Office was set up to assess and record the value of each property. The result was a nationwide survey of all workshops, houses, farms etc., which recorded details such as the owner, occupier, value and the number of rooms of each property. The surveyors used Ordnance Survey maps to identify each property and then enter the detailed information into 'Field Books'. These records are useful for exploring land values, land ownership and land occupancy.
