= Corn-rent =

Variable money rent that follows fluctuations in the price of corn

Corn rent is a type of variable money rent that follows fluctuations in the price of corn. The word corn in British English denoted all cereal grains, including wheat, oats and barley.

The underlying concept of corn-rent is that a tenant farmer pays a portion of the produce of a farm to the landlord as rent. However, the price of produce varies and so the money value of this allotted portion varies based on the price.

== Enclosures ==
The 1830 case King v. Joddrell concerned Yelling Parish, the corn-rent was imposed as compensation after the practice of paying tithes ended when the parish was enclosed by an act of Parliament.

== Ricardo and Malthus ==
David Ricardo wrote:

"But there are improvements which may lower the relative value of the produce without lowering the corn rent, though they will lower the money rent of the land. Such improvements do not increase the productive powers of the land; but they enable us to obtain its produce with less labour...Less capital, which is the same thing as less labour, will be employed on the land; but to obtain the same produce, less land cannot be cultivated. Whether improvements of this kind, however, effect corn rent, must depend on the question, whether the difference between the produce obtained by the employment of different portions of capital be increased, stationary or diminished. If four portions of capital, 50, 60, 70 and 80, be employed on the land, giving each the same results, and any provement in the formation of such capital should enable me to withdraw five from each, so that they should be 45, 55, 65, and 75, no alteration would take place in the corn rent."

In Principles Ricardo defined rent as the "proportion of the whole produce [of the produce obtained with a given capital on a given farm] without any reference to its exchangeable value". Ricardo reasons that where "the same cause, the difficulty of production, raises the exchangeable value of raw produce paid to the landlord for rent, it is obvious that the landlord is doubly benefited by difficulty of production. First he obtains a greater share, and secondly the commodity in which he is paid is of greater value." In response to Thomas Malthus' claim that "Improvements in agriculture tend even according to the concessions of Mr. Ricardo to increase the proportion of the whole produce which falls to the landlord's share", Ricardo replied:

"If therefore I have anywhere said that rent rises or falls in the proportion that the produce is obtained is increased or diminished I have committed an error. I am not however conscious of having done so."

In Notes on Malthus Ricardo states that the "landlords relative condition to the capitalists will gradually improve with the progress of the country, although his rent will certainly not increase in the proportion of the gross produce." During the Corn Laws debates, landlords complained that their relative share of social income had fallen, though the models devised by Ricardo had predicted they would rise with population and capital. According to Malthus' own account:

"During the last forty years...though rents have greatly increased in exchangeable value...it appears by the returns of the Board of Agriculture that they are now only a fifth of the gross produce, whereas they were formerly a fourth or a third."

== See also ==
- Corn Laws
- Tithe
- Differential and absolute ground rent
- Law of rent
- Tax in kind
- Tax in kind in the Confederate States of America
