= Exploitation of labour =

Economic phenomenon

Exploitation is a concept defined as, in its broadest sense, one agent taking unfair advantage of another agent. When applying this to labour, it denotes an unjust social relationship based on an asymmetry of power or unequal exchange of value between workers and their employers. When speaking about exploitation, there is a direct affiliation with consumption in social theory and traditionally this would label exploitation as unfairly taking advantage of another person because of their vulnerable position, giving the exploiter the power.

Karl Marx's theory of exploitation has been described in the Stanford Encyclopedia of Philosophy as the most influential theory of exploitation. Marx described exploitation as the theft of economic power in all class-based societies, including capitalism, through the working class (or the proletariat, as Marx called them) being forced to sell their labour. The two main perspectives when analysing the exploitation of labour are that of Marx and that of Adam Smith, a classical economist. Smith did not see exploitation as an inherent systematic phenomenon in certain economic systems as Marx did, but rather something that stems from a random occurrence in the chaos of the market, such as a monopoly, that will even out by the tendency of the free market towards equilibrium.

== Liberal theory ==
Many assume that liberalism intrinsically lacks any adequate theory of exploitation because its phenomenon commits itself only to the primacy of personal rights and liberties and to individual choice as the basic explanatory datum. Hillel Steiner provided an argument to refute the claim that liberalism cannot supply an adequate theory of exploitation. He discusses interpersonal transfers and how there are three types: donation, exchange and theft. Exchange is the only of the three that consists of a voluntary bilateral transfer, where the beneficiary receives something at a value greater than zero on the shared scale of value, although at times there can be ambiguity between more complex types of transfer. He describes the three dimensions of transfers as either unilateral/bilateral, voluntary/involuntary and equal/unequal. Despite these types of transfers being able to distinguish the differences in the four types of transfers, it is not enough to provide a differentiating characterisation of exploitation. Unlike theft, an exploitative transfer is bilateral and the items are transferred voluntarily at both unequal and greater-than-zero value. The difference between a benefit and exploitation despite their various shared features is a difference between their counterfactual presuppositions, meaning that in an exploitation there is a voluntary bilateral transfer of unequally valued items because the possessors of both items would voluntarily make the transfer if the items to be transferred were of equal value, but in a benefit the possessor of the higher-value item would not voluntarily make the transfer if the items were at equal value. Put simply, the exploitation can be converted to an exchange: both exploiters and exploited would voluntarily become exchangers when benefactors would not.

In an exploitation both transfers are voluntary, but part of one of the two transfers is unnecessary. The circumstances that bring out exploitation are not the same as what brings about exploitative transfers. Exploitative circumstance is due to the factors other than what motivates individuals to engage in nonaltruistic bilateral transfers (exchanges and exploitations) as they are not sufficient circumstances to bring about exploitative transfers.

To further explain the occurrence of exploitative circumstances certain generalisations about social relations must be included to supply generalisations about social institutions. He says that 'if (i) certain things are true of the institutions within which interpersonal transfers occur and (ii) at least some of these transfers are nonaltruistic bilateral ones, then at least some of these transfers are exploitative. Steiner looks at the institutional conditions of exploitation and finds that in general exploitation is considered unjust and to understand why it is necessary to look at the concept of a right, an inviolable domain of practical choice and the way rights are established to form social institutions. Institutional exploitation can be illustrated by schematised forms of exploitation to reach two points:

1. Despite the mode of deprivation in exploitation, it is not the same as the mode involved in a violation of rights and it does result from such violations and the two deprivations may be of the same value.
2. Rights violation (theft) is a bilateral relation, but exploitation is trilateral one. There are at least three persons needed for exploitation.

On a liberal view, exploitation can be described as a quadrilateral relation between four relevantly distinct parties: the state, the exploited, the exploiter and those who suffer rights violations. However, it can be argued that the state's interests with the exploiters action can be viewed as unimpeachable because you cannot imply that the exploiter would ever withhold consent from exploiting due to altruistic concerns. So this trilateral conception of exploitation identifies exploited, exploiters and sufferers of rights violations.

In terms of ridding exploitation, the standard liberal view holds that a regime of laissez-faire is a necessary condition. Natural rights thinkers Henry George and Herbert Spencer reject this view and claim that property rights belong to everyone, i.e., that all land to be valid must belong to everyone. Their argument aims to show that traditional liberalism is mistaken in holding that nonintervention in commerce is the key to non-exploitation and they argue it is necessary, but not sufficient.

The classical liberal Adam Smith described the exploitation of labour by businessmen, who work together to extract as much wealth as possible out of their workers, thus:

What are the common wages of labour, depends everywhere upon the contract usually made between those two parties, whose interests are by no means the same. The workmen desire to get as much, the masters to give as little as possible. The former are disposed to combine in order to raise, the latter in order to lower the wages of labour.

== Neoclassical theory ==
The majority of neoclassical economists only would view exploitation existing as an abstract deduction of the classic school and of Ricardo's theory of surplus-value. However, in some neoclassical economic theories exploitation is defined by the unequal marginal productivity of workers and wages, such that wages are lower. Exploitation is sometimes viewed to occur when a necessary agent of production receives less wages than its marginal product. Neoclassical theorists also identify the need for some type of redistribution of income to the poor, disabled, to the farmers and peasants, or whatever socially alienated group from the social welfare function. However, it is not true that neoclassical economists would accept the marginal productivity theory of just income as a general principle like other theorists do when addressing exploitation. The general neoclassical view sees that all factors can be simultaneously rewarded according to their marginal productivity: this means that factors of production should be awarded according to their marginal productivity as well, Euler's theorem for homogeneous function of the first order proves this:

f(K,L)= f_{K}(K,L)K+f_{L}(K,L)L

The production function where K is capital and L is labour. Neoclassical theory requires that f be continuously differentiable in both variables and that there are constant returns to scale. If there are constant returns to scale, there will be perfect equilibrium if both capital and labour are rewarded according to their marginal products, exactly exhausting the total product.

The primary concept is that there is exploitation towards a factor of production, if it receives less than its marginal product. Exploitation can only occur in imperfect capitalism due to imperfect competition, with the neoclassical notion of productivity wages there is little to no exploitation in the economy. This blames monopoly in the product market, monopsony in the labour market and cartelisation as the main causes for exploitation of workers. In his discussion of neoclassical exploitation, Nicholas Vrousalis argues that monopoly and monopsony are unnecessary to exploitation, as exploitation is compatible with perfectly competitive markets.

== Socialist theory ==
Wage labour as institutionalised under today's market economic systems has been criticised, especially by both mainstream socialists and anarcho-syndicalists, utilising the pejorative term wage slavery. They regard the trade of labour as a commodity as a form of economic exploitation rooting partially from capitalism.

As per Noam Chomsky, analysis of the psychological implications of wage slavery goes back to the Age of Enlightenment era. In his 1791 book On the Limits of State Action, liberal thinker Wilhelm von Humboldt posited that "whatever does not spring from a man's free choice, or is only the result of instruction and guidance, does not enter into his very nature; he does not perform it with truly human energies, but merely with mechanical exactness" and so when the labourer works under external control "we may admire what he does, but we despise what he is". Both the Milgram and Stanford experiments have been found useful in the psychological study of wage-based workplace relations.

== Marxist theory ==
Karl Marx's exploitation theory is one of the major elements analysed in Marxian economics and some social theorists consider it to be a cornerstone in Marxist thought. Marx credited the Scottish Enlightenment writers for originally propounding a materialist interpretation of history. In his Critique of the Gotha Program, Marx set principles that were to govern the distribution of welfare under socialism and communism—these principles saw distribution to each person according to their work and needs. Exploitation is when these two principles are not met, when the agents are not receiving according to their work or needs. This process of exploitation is a part of the redistribution of labour, occurring during the process of separate agents exchanging their current productive labour for social labour set in goods received. The labour put forth toward production is embodied in the goods and exploitation occurs when someone purchases a good, with their revenue or wages, for an amount unequal to the total labour he or she has put forth. This labour performed by a population over a certain time period is equal to the labour embodied to the goods that make up the net national product (NNP). The NNP is then parceled out to the members of the population in some way and this is what creates the two groups, or agents, involved in the exchange of goods: exploiters and exploited.

According to Marxist economics, the exploiters are the agents able to command goods, with revenue from their income, that are embodied with more labour than the exploiters themselves have put forth—based on the exploitative social relations of Marxist theory of capitalist production. These agents often have class status and ownership of productive assets that aid the optimisation of exploitation. Meanwhile, the exploited are those who receive less than the average product he or she produces. If workers receive an amount equivalent to their average product, there is no revenue left over and therefore these workers cannot enjoy the fruits of their own labours and the difference between what is made and what that can purchase cannot be justified by redistribution according to need. According to Marxist theory, in a capitalist society, the exploited are the proletariat, and the exploiters would typically be the bourgeoisie. For Marx, the phenomenon of exploitation was a characteristic of all class-based societies, not only capitalism.

=== Surplus labour and labour theory of value ===
In the Marxist critique of political economy, exploiters appropriate another's surplus labour, which is the amount of labour exceeding what is necessary for the reproduction of a worker's labour power and basic living conditions. In other terms, this entails the worker being able to maintain living conditions sufficient to be able to continue work. Marx does not attempt to tie this solely to capitalist institutions as he notes how historically, there are accounts of this appropriation of surplus labour in institutions with forced labour, like those based on slavery and feudal societies. However, the difference he emphasises is the fact that when this appropriation of surplus labour occurs in societies like capitalist ones, it is occurring in institutions having abolished forced labour and resting on free labour. This comes from Marx's labour theory of value which means that, for any commodity, the price (or wage) of labour power is determined by its cost of production—namely, the quantity of socially necessary labour time required to produce it.

Marxists posit that labour as commodity, which is how they regard wage labour, provides an absolutely fundamental point of attack against capitalism. One philosopher noted "that the conception of the worker's labor as a commodity confirms Marx's stigmatisation of the wage system of private capitalism as 'wage-slavery;' that is, as an instrument of the capitalist's for reducing the worker's condition to that of a slave, if not below it".

In a capitalist economy, workers are paid according to this value and value is the source of all wealth. Value is determined by a good's particular utility for an actor and if the good results from human activity, it must be understood as a product of concrete labour, qualitatively defined labour. Capitalists are able to purchase labour power from the workers, who can only bring their own labour power in the market. Once capitalists are able to pay the worker less than the value produced by their labour, surplus labour forms and this results in the capitalists' profits. This is what Marx meant by "surplus value", which he saw as "an exact expression for the degree of exploitation of labor-power by capital, or of the laborer by the capitalist". This profit is used to pay for overhead and personal consumption by the capitalist, but was most importantly used to accelerate growth and thus promote a greater system of exploitation.

The degree of exploitation of labour power is dictated by the rate of surplus value as the proportion between surplus value/product and necessary value/product. The surplus value/product is the materialised surplus labour or surplus labour time while the necessary value/product is materialised necessary labour in regard to workers, like the reproduction of the labour power. Marx called the rate of surplus value an "exact expression of the degree of exploitation of labour power by capital".

=== Criticism ===
Many capitalist critics claim that Marx assumes that capital owners contribute nothing to the process of production. They suggest that Marx should have allowed for two things; namely, permit a fair profit on the risk of capital investment and allow for the efforts of management be paid their due.

David Ramsay Steele argues that marginal productivity theory renders Marx's theory of exploitation untenable. According to this theoretical framework and assuming competitive market conditions, a worker's compensation is determined by his or her contribution to marginal output. Similarly, owners of machines and real estate are compensated according to the marginal productivity of their capital's contribution to marginal output. However, Steele notes that this does not in any way touch the ethical argument of socialists who acknowledge non-labour contributions to marginal output, but contend that it is illegitimate for a class of passive owners to receive an unearned income from ownership of capital and land.

Meghnad Desai, Baron Desai observed that there is also the prospect of surplus value arising from sources other than labour and a classic given example is winemaking. When grapes are harvested and crushed, labour is used. However, when yeast is added and the grape juice is left to ferment in order to get wine, the value of wine exceeds that of the grapes significantly, yet labour contributes nothing to the extra value. Marx had ignored capital inputs due to placing them all together in constant capital—translating the wear and tear of capital in production in terms of its labour value. Yet examples such as this demonstrated that value and surplus value could come from somewhere other than labour.

The theory has been opposed by Eugen Böhm von Bawerk, among others. In History and Critique of Interest Theories (1884), he argues that capitalists do not exploit their workers, as they actually help employees by providing them with an income well in advance of the revenue from the goods they produced, stating: "Labor cannot increase its share at the expense of capital". In particular, he argues that the theory of exploitation ignores the dimension of time in production. From this criticism, it follows that, according to Böhm-Bawerk, the whole value of a product is not produced by the worker, but that labour can only be paid at the present value of any foreseeable output.

John Roemer studied and criticised Marx's theory by putting forth a model to deal with exploitation in all modes of production, hoping to lay the foundations for an analysis of the laws of motion of socialism. In his works published in the 1980s, Roemer posits a model of exploitation based upon unequal ownership of human (physical labour skills) and non-human property (land and means of production). He states that this model of property rights has great superiority over the conventional surplus labour model of exploitation, therefore rejecting the labour theory of value. In his attempt to put forward a theory of exploitation that also includes feudal, capitalist and socialist modes of production, he defines exploitation in each of the modes in terms of property rights. Roemer rejects the labour theory of value because he sees that exploitation can exist in the absence of employment relations, like in a subsistence economy, therefore backing the model of exploitation that is based on property rights. He tests his theory of exploitation using game theory to construct contingently feasible alternative states where the exploited agents could improve their welfare by withdrawing with their share of society's alienable and inalienable assets. Feudal, capitalist and socialist exploitation all come from the theory of exploitation on the basis of inequitable distribution of property rights. There has been a range of agreement and disagreement from various economists, neo-classical economists favouring the model the most.

Some theorists criticise Roemer for his entire rejection of the labour theory of value and the surplus labour approach to exploitation, for they were the central aspects of Marxist thought in regard to exploitation. Others criticise his commitment to a specifically liberal as opposed to a Marxist account of the wrongs of exploitation.

In response to Roemer, Nicholas Vrousalis has argued that Roemer is right to criticise the labour theory of value, but that does not subtract from the value of Marx's exploitation theory. According to Vrousalis, the correspondence between price and value posited by the original Marxian theory is unnecessary to the centrality of labour to the theory of exploitation.

== In developing nations ==
Developing nations, commonly called Third World countries, are the focus of much debate over the issue of exploitation, particularly in the context of the global economy.

For example, observers point to cases where employees were unable to escape factories burning down—and thus dying—because of locked doors, a common signal that sweatshop conditions exist, similar to the Triangle Shirtwaist Factory fire of 1911.

Others argue that in the absence of compulsion the only way that corporations are able to secure adequate supplies of labour is to offer wages and benefits superior to preexisting options and that the presence of workers in corporate factories indicates that the factories present options which are seen as better—by the workers themselves—than the other options available to them (see principle of revealed preference).

Furthermore, the argument goes that if people choose to work for low wages and in unsafe conditions because it is their only alternative to starvation or scavenging from garbage dumps (the "preexisting options"), this cannot be seen as any kind of "free choice" on their part. It also argued that if a company intends to sell its products in the First World, it should pay its workers by First World standards.

Following such a view, some in the United States propose that the American government should mandate that businesses in foreign countries adhere to the same labour, environmental, health and safety standards as the United States before they are allowed to trade with businesses in the United States (this has been advocated by Howard Dean, for example).

According to others, this would harm the economies of less developed nations by discouraging the United States from investing in them. Milton Friedman was an economist who thought that such a policy would have that effect. According to this argument, the result of ending perceived exploitation would therefore be the corporation pulling back to its developed nation, leaving their former workers out of a job.

Groups who see themselves as fighting against global exploitation also point to secondary effects such as the dumping of government-subsidised corn on developing world markets which forces subsistence farmers off of their lands, sending them into the cities or across borders in order to survive. More generally, some sort of international regulation of transnational corporations is called for, such as the enforcement of the International Labour Organization's labour standards.

The fair trade movement seeks to ensure a more equitable treatment of producers and workers, therefore minimising exploitation of labour forces in developing countries. The exploitation of labour is not limited to the aforementioned large scale corporate outsourcing, but it can also be found within the inherent structure of local markets in developing countries like Kenya.

== In popular media ==
- Victor Hugo - Melancholia
- Émile Zola, Germinal, describes the harsh working conditions in coal mines.

== See also ==
- Benjamin Tucker
- Capital, Volume I
- Child labour
- Child sexual exploitation
- Contemporary slavery
- Corporate abuse
- Cost the limit of price
- Criticism of capitalism
- Critique of work
- Debt bondage
- Exploitation of natural resources
- Forced prostitution
- Frisch elasticity of labour supply
- Globalisation
- Global labour arbitrage
- Gulag
- Human trafficking
- Indentured servant
- Job strain
- Kafala system
- Laogai
- Labour shortage
- List of global issues
- Mutualism
- Neocolonialism
- Overexploitation
- Property income
- Prosumerism
- Rate of exploitation
- Sharecropping
- Trafficking of children
- Unearned income
- Unequal exchange
- Unfree labour
- Wage slavery
