= Scoop (news) =

Journalism term

In journalism, a scoop or exclusive is an item of news reported by one journalist or news organization before others, and of exceptional originality, importance, surprise, excitement, or secrecy.

Scoops are important and likely to interest or concern many people. A scoop may be a new story, or a new aspect to an existing or breaking news story. It may be unexpected, surprising, formerly secret, and may come from an exclusive source. Events witnessed by many people generally cannot become scoops, (e.g., a natural disaster, or the announcement at a press conference). However, exclusive news content is not always a scoop, as it may not provide the requisite importance or excitement. A scoop may be also defined retrospectively; a story may come to be known as a scoop because of a historical change in perspective of a particular event. Due to their secret nature, scandals are a prime source of scoops (e.g., the Watergate scandal by Washington Post journalists Woodward and Bernstein).

Scoops are part of journalistic lore, and generally confer prestige on the journalist or news organization.

== Word origin ==
The word scoop is of American origin and was first documented in 1874. Its use as a verb, meaning to beat another reporter or publication to a story was first recorded in 1884.

== Extended usage ==
More generally, a scoop is the first discovery or the first report of something important.

In some of John le Carré's spy novels, a scoop is new information of major strategic importance, not, of course, intended for publication.

A scoop in the scientific community is a report by one group before another, giving them scientific priority. In science, it is often considered important to be the first to make an important discovery. According to a 2025 study, scientific teams that get scooped by other teams "are less likely to publish in top journals and receive 21 percent fewer citations."

== See also ==
- First-mover advantage
- Investigative journalism
