= Oddingley =

Village in Worcestershire, England

Coordinates: 52.2339°N 2.1339°W

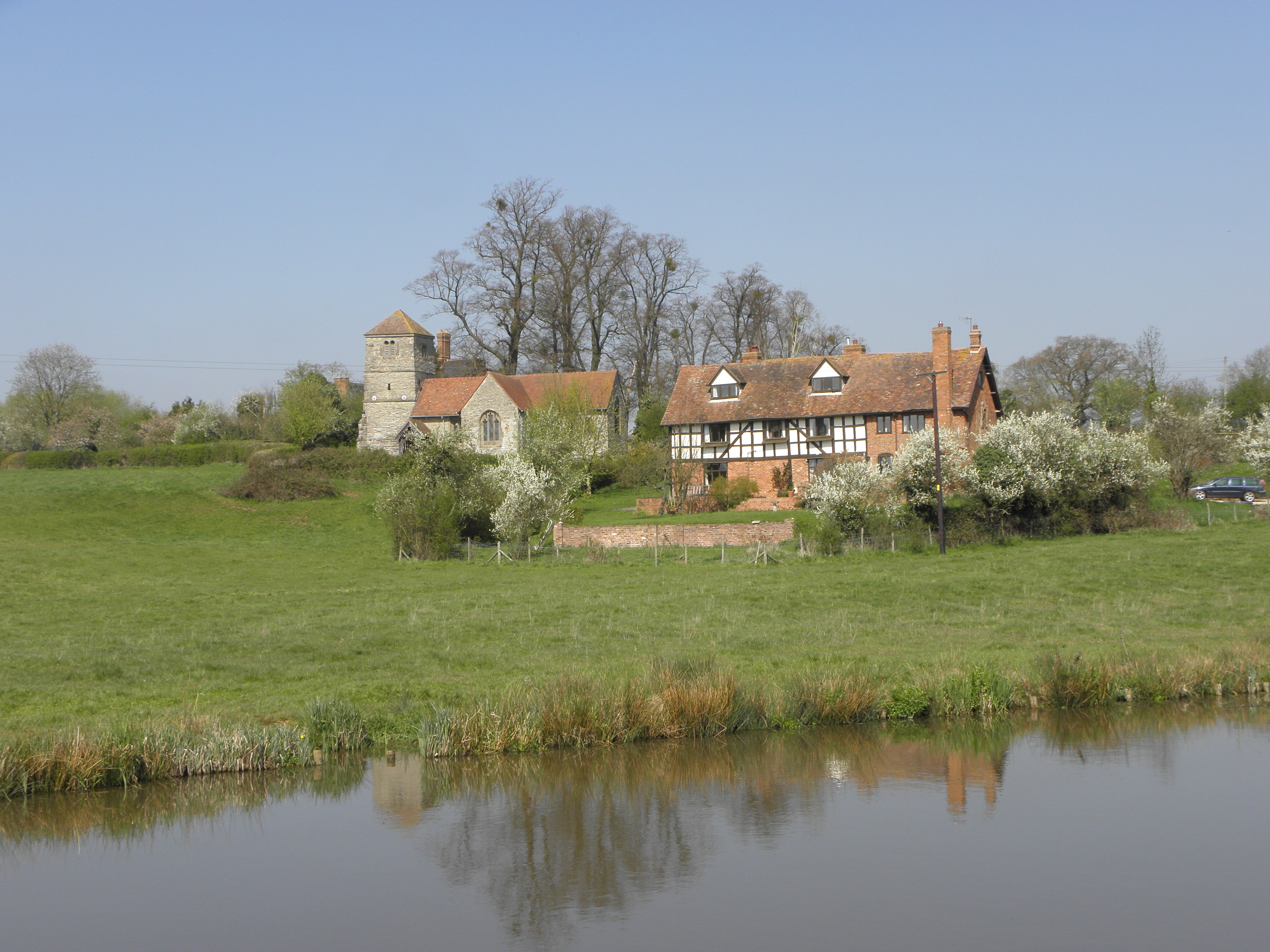
- The church of Oddingley seen from the Worcester and Birmingham Canal

- Location within Worcestershire
- Population: 297 (2021 census)
- OS grid reference: SO909595
- Civil parish: Oddingley
- District: Wychavon
- Shire county: Worcestershire
- Region: West Midlands
- Country: England
- Sovereign state: United Kingdom
- Post town: DROITWICH
- Postcode district: WR9
- Dialling code: 01905
- Police: West Mercia
- Fire: Hereford and Worcester
- Ambulance: West Midlands
- UK Parliament: Droitwich and Evesham
- Website: http://www.oddingleychurch.org.uk

Oddingley is a village and civil parish in the Wychavon district of Worcestershire, England. It is approximately 6 miles north-east of Worcester. The civil parish population was recorded at 297 in 2021.

== History ==
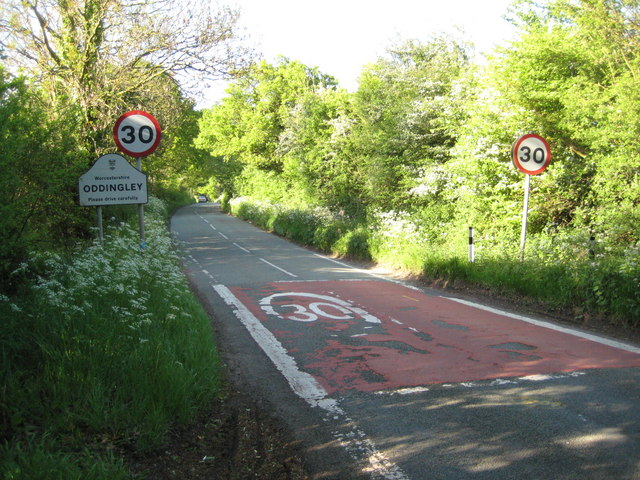
Approaching Oddingley

=== Toponymy ===
Oddingley was recorded in 816 as Oddingalea. It was listed in the Domesday Book of 1086 as Oddunclei. The name derives from the Old English for "Woodland clearing of the family or followers of [a man called] Odda".

=== 19th century ===
In 1806, Oddingley became known for the unsolved murder of the village parson, George Parker. Parker was shot and beaten to death by a man widely suspected to be Richard Hemming, a carpenter from Droitwich. Hemming was never apprehended and it was believed that he had escaped the country. In 1830, a body was found which was later identified to be that of Hemming.

== Governance ==
Oddingley is in the Bowbrook ward of the Worcestershire district of Wychavon. It is part of the constituency of Droitwich and Evesham, represented at parliament by Conservative MP Nigel Huddleston. It was part of the West Midlands constituency of the European Parliament prior to Britain leaving the European Union in January 2020.

== Geography ==
Oddingley lies approximately 9 km (5.6 mi) north-east of the county town of Worcester and about 5 km (3.1 mi) south of Droitwich. Nearby villages to Oddingley include Hadzor, Newland, Dunhampstead, Saleway, Sale Green and Tibberton. It is situated close to the Worcester and Birmingham Canal.

== Demography ==
The population of Oddingley, according to the 1801 census, was 110. In the 1991 census, the population of the village was recorded as 165. By 2001, this had grown to 197 with 77 households.

Population of Oddingley
Year	1801	1811	1821	1831	1841	1851	1861	1871	1881	1891
Population	110	155	168	157	-	-	202	195	193	152
Year	1901	1911	1921	1931	1941	1951	1961	1971	1981	1991
Population	130	110	97	113	-	-	-	-	-	165
Year	2001	2011	2021							
Population	197	287	297							

== Church ==
Oddingley's church is dedicated to Saint James the Apostle and lies to the south of the village. In June 2014, the church website was launched to provide more information about the history of the church, its current services and upcoming events.
