= Economic rent =

Difference between marginal product and opportunity cost

In economics, economic rent is any payment to the owner of a factor of production in excess of the costs needed to bring that factor into production. In classical economics, economic rent is any payment made (including imputed value) or benefit received for non-produced inputs such as location (land) and for assets formed by creating official privilege over natural opportunities (e.g., patents). In the moral economy of neoclassical economics, assuming the market is natural and not the product of state and social contrivance, economic rent includes income gained by labor, state beneficiaries, or other "contrived" exclusivity, such as labor guilds and unofficial corruption.

== Overview ==
In the broader economics tradition, economic rent is distinct from producer surplus or normal profit, both of which are theorized to involve productive human action. Economic rent is also independent of opportunity cost, unlike economic profit, of which opportunity cost is an essential component. Economic rent is viewed as unearned revenue while economic profit is a narrower term describing surplus income earned by choosing between risk-adjusted alternatives. Unlike economic profit, economic rent cannot be theoretically eliminated by competition because any actions the recipient of the income may take, such as improving the object being rented, will change the total income to contract rent. Contract rent refers to rent mutually agreed upon by the landowner and the user. Still, total income consists of economic profit (earned) plus economic rent (unearned).

For a produced commodity, economic rent may arise from the legal ownership of a patent (a politically enforced right to use a process or ingredient). For education and occupational licensing, it is the knowledge, performance, and ethical standards, as well as the cost of permits and licenses, that are collectively controlled as to their number, regardless of the competence and willingness of those who wish to compete on price alone in the area being licensed. Regarding labor, economic rent can be created by the existence of mass education, labor laws, state social reproduction supports, democracy, guilds, and labor unions (e.g., higher pay for some workers, where collective action creates a scarcity of such workers, as opposed to an ideal condition where labor competes with other factors of production on price alone). For most other production, including agriculture and extraction, economic rent is due to a scarcity (uneven distribution) of natural resources (e.g., land, oil, or minerals). The term scarcity rent refers to the price paid for the use of homogeneous land when its supply is limited in relation to demand. If all units of land are homogeneous but demand exceeds supply, all land will earn economic rent by virtue of its scarcity. Conversely, if land differs in fertility (i.e., productivity), the surplus that arises due to the difference between the marginal and infra-marginal land is termed differential rent. The term was first proposed by David Ricardo.

When economic rent is privatized, the recipient of economic rent is referred to as a rentier.

By contrast, in production theory, if there is no exclusivity and there is perfect competition, there are no economic rents, as competition drives prices down to their floor.

Economic rent is different from other unearned and passive income, including contract rent. This distinction has important implications for public revenue and tax policy. As long as there is sufficient accounting profit, governments can collect a portion of economic rent for public finance. For example, economic rent can be collected by a government as royalties or extraction fees for resources such as minerals, oil, and gas.

Historically, theories of rent have typically applied to rent received by different factor owners within a single economy. Hossein Mahdavy was the first to introduce the concept of "external rent", or rent received by one economy from other economies.

== Definitions ==
Since the late 1800s, there have been several substantially different conflicting definitions of the term "economic rent", and some of these definitions continue to be used today, often interchangeably, causing considerable confusion.

In the late 1800s, Henry George, best known for his proposal for a land value tax, defined rent in the context of land (not economic rent) as "the part of the produce that accrues to the owners of land (or other natural capabilities) by virtue of ownership" and as "the share of wealth given to landowners because they have an exclusive right to the use of those natural capabilities." Other thinkers around the same time conceptualized economic rent as "incomes analogous to land rents in the sense of rewarding control over persistently scarce or monopolised assets, rather than labour or sacrifice."

Over time, neoclassical economics extended the concept of rent to encompass factors beyond natural resource rents. Some definitions of rent found in the literature include:

- "The excess earnings over the amount necessary to keep the factor in its current occupation."
- "The difference between what a factor of production is paid and how much it would need to be paid to remain in its current use."
- "A return over and above opportunity costs, or the normal return necessary to keep a resource in its current use."
- "Income in excess of opportunity cost or competitive price."
- "A return in excess of the resource owner's opportunity cost". that is, "excess returns" above the "normal levels" generated in competitive markets.
- "Extra returns that firms or individuals obtain due to their positional advantages."

Neoclassical rent is sometimes referred to as "Paretian". However, this definition may be a misnomer in that Vilfredo Pareto, the economist for whom this kind of rent was named, may or may not have proffered any conceptual formulation of rent.

=== In industrial organization ===
Monopoly rent refers to those economic rents derived from monopolies, which can result from (1) denial of access to an asset or (2) the unique qualities of an asset. Examples of monopoly rent include: rents associated from legally enforced knowledge monopolies derived from intellectual property like patents or copyrights; rents associated with 'de facto' monopolies of companies like Microsoft and Intel who control the underlying standards in an industry or product line (e.g. Microsoft Office); rents associated with 'natural monopolies' of public or private utilities (e.g. telephone, electricity, railways, etc.); and rents associated with network effects of platform technologies controlled by companies like Facebook, Google, or Amazon.

An antitrust probe described Google Play and Apple App Store fees as "monopoly rents".

=== In labor economics ===
The generalization of the concept of rent to include opportunity cost has highlighted the role of political barriers in creating and privatizing rents. For example, a person seeking to become a member of a medieval guild makes a significant investment in training and education, which has limited applicability outside that guild. In a competitive market, the wages of a member of the guild would be set so that the expected net return on the investment in training would be just enough to justify investing. In a sense, the required investment is a natural barrier to entry, discouraging some would-be members from making the necessary training investment to enter the competitive market for the guild's services. This is a natural "free market" self-limiting control on the number of guild members and/or the cost of training necessitated by certification. Some of those who would have opted for a particular guild may decide to join a different guild or occupation.

However, a political restriction on the number of people entering the competitive market for services of the guild has the effect of raising the return on investments in the guild's training, especially for those already practicing, by creating an artificial scarcity of guild members. To the extent that a constraint on entrants to the guild actually increases the returns to guild members as opposed to ensuring competence, then the practice of limiting entrants to the field is a rent-seeking activity, and the excess return realized by the guild members is economic rent.

The same model explains the high wages in some modern professions that have been able to both obtain legal protection from competition and limit their membership, notably medical doctors, actuaries, and lawyers. In countries where the creation of new universities is limited by legal charter, such as the UK, it also applies to professors. It may also apply to careers that are inherently competitive in the sense that there is a fixed number of slots, such as football league positions, music charts, or urban territory for illegal drug selling. These jobs are characterised by a small number of rich members of the guild, along with a much larger surrounding of poor people competing against each other under very poor conditions as they "pay their dues" to try to join the guild.

=== In economic theory ===
In the mid-1900s, public choice theorists began using the term "economic rent" to refer specifically to the wealth derived from state-granted rights that transfer wealth from others to the new right holders, rather than creating new wealth to be split between producer and consumer. The modern term rent seeking derives from this definition of economic rent.

In the field of mechanism design, information rent is rent that an economic agent derives from having information not provided to another agent, or to the principal in the specific case of principal-agent models.

== Quasi-rent ==
Quasi-rent (also called Marshallian quasi-rent or Marshallian rent) is a short-run rent-like return earned by a factor of production whose supply is fixed (or highly inelastic) over the relevant time horizon. The term quasi-rent and its systematic analysis are associated with Alfred Marshall, who developed it to extend rent-like reasoning from land to other durable factors that are fixed in supply in the short period. In Alfred Marshall's usage, quasi-rent is most naturally discussed in the context of durable, man-made agents of production (such as machines or buildings). In the short term, their quantity cannot be quickly increased, so their earnings can include a surplus over variable running costs. Marshall emphasized that the returns on "old investments of capital" in the short period may resemble rent, and that the boundary between interest on freely adjustable capital and quasi-rent on sunk or specialized capital is not sharp.

In modern industrial organization and organizational economics, quasi-rent is often defined in opportunity-cost terms: the quasi-rent from deploying an asset in a particular relationship is the excess of its value in that relationship over its value in the next-best alternative use (sometimes described as its "salvage value"). When the next-best alternative involves another trading partner, the portion of quasi-rent that exceeds the asset's value to the second-highest-valuing user is sometimes called an appropriable quasi-rent because it can be the object of ex post bargaining (the "hold-up" problem).

While defined similarly as an "excess return", quasi-rent differs from pure economic rent in that it incentivizes the action(s) required to earn the quasi-rent in the first place. For example, firms may invest in innovation to earn quasi-rent in the form of a short-run first-mover advantage. In the longer term, however, the opportunity to profit will generate new capital, and the quasi-rent will be competed away.

== Origins of the term ==
In political economy, including physiocracy, classical economics, Georgism, and other schools of economic thought, land is recognized as an inelastic factor of production. Land, in this sense, means exclusive access rights to any natural opportunity. Rent is the share paid to freeholders for allowing production on the land they control.

As soon as the land of any country has all become private property, the landlords, like all other men, love to reap where they never sowed, and demand a rent even for its natural produce. The wood of the forest, the grass of the field, and all the natural fruits of the earth, which, when land was in common, cost the labourer only the trouble of gathering them, come, even to him, to have an additional price fixed upon them. He must then pay for the licence to gather them; and must give up to the landlord a portion of what his labour either collects or produces. This portion, or, what comes to the same thing, the price of this portion, constitutes the rent of land ....

— Adam Smith: The Wealth of Nations

Thomas Robert Malthus, David Ricardo, Robert Torrens, and Edward West are credited with the first clear and comprehensive analysis of differential land rent and the associated economic relationships (law of rent). Their pamphlets in February 1815 had a little known precursor at the time in the work of James Anderson.

Johann Heinrich von Thünen was influential in developing the spatial analysis of rents, which highlighted the importance of centrality and transport. Simply put, it was the population density, which increased the profitability of commerce and provided for the division and specialization of labor, that commanded higher municipal rents. These high rents meant that land in a central city would not be allocated to farming but would instead be used for more profitable residential or commercial purposes.

Observing that a tax on the unearned rent of land would not distort economic activities, Henry George proposed that publicly collected land rents (land value taxation) should be the primary (or only) source of public revenue. However, he also advocated public ownership, taxation, and regulation of natural monopolies and monopolies of scale that cannot be eliminated by regulation.

== See also ==
- Differential and absolute ground rent
- FIRE economy (finance, insurance, and real estate)
- Ground rent
- Hotelling's rule
- List of economics topics
- Property income
- Quasi-rent
- Rentier state
- Schumpeterian rent
- Unearned income
