= Unearned income =

Income gained through ownership of land and other monopoly

Unearned income is a term coined by Henry George to refer to the income gained through the ownership of land and other forms of monopoly. Today, the term often refers to income received from owning property (known as property income), inheritance, pensions, and payments from public welfare. The three major forms of unearned income based on property ownership are rent, received from the ownership of natural resources; interest, received by virtue of owning financial assets; and profit, received from the ownership of capital equipment. As such, unearned income is often categorized as "passive income". It is akin to the term unearned increment, coined by John Stuart Mill, who proposed taxing it so that it benefits every member of a society.

Unearned income can be discussed from either an economic or accounting perspective, however is more commonly used in economics.

== Economics ==
'Unearned income' is a term coined by Henry George to popularize the economic concept of land rent and 'rent' generally. George modified John Stuart Mill's term 'unearned increment of land' to broaden the concept to include all land rent, not just increases in land price.

In economics, 'unearned income' has different meanings and implications depending on the theoretical framework used. To classical economists, with their emphasis on dynamic competition, income not subject to competition, mainly income from land titles, is 'economic rent' or unearned income. According to certain conceptions of the Labor Theory of Value, it may refer to all income that is not an immediate result of labor. In a neoclassical framework, it may mean income not attributable to the normal return to a factor of production. Generally, it may refer to windfall profits, such as when population growth increases the value of a plot of land.

Classical political economists, such as Adam Smith and John Locke, viewed land as distinct from other forms of property because humans did not produce it. Land ownership, in the sense of political economy, could refer to ownership over any natural phenomena, including air rights, water rights, drilling rights, or spectrum rights. Classics like John Stuart Mill were also concerned about monopolies, both natural monopolies and artificial ones, and didn't consider their incomes entirely earned.

In Marxian economics and related schools, unearned income originates from the surplus value produced by an economy, where "surplus value" refers to value beyond what is needed for subsistence. As such, individuals and groups who subsist on unearned income are characterized as being in an exploitative relationship because the unearned income they receive is not generated by their effort or contribution (hence why their income is "unearned"). The existence of unearned income from property ownership underpins the Marxist class analysis of capitalism, in which unearned income and exploitation are viewed as inherent to capitalist production.

== United States ==
As defined by the American Social Security Administration, unearned income is all income that is not earned from one's job or from one's business. Some common types of unearned income are:

- The value of food or shelter received from someone, or the amount of money received to help pay for them;
- Department of Veterans Affairs (VA) benefits;
- Railroad retirement and railroad unemployment benefits;
- Annuities, pensions from any government or private source, workers' compensation, unemployment insurance benefits, black lung benefits, and Social Security benefits;
- Prizes, lottery winnings, settlements, and awards, including court-ordered awards;
- Proceeds of life insurance policies;
- Gifts and contributions;
- Support and alimony payments;
- Inheritances in cash or property;
- Rental income;
- Dividends and interest; and
- Strike pay and other benefits from unions.

== Taxation ==
Unearned income has often been treated differently for tax purposes than earned income, to redistribute income or to recognize its qualitative difference from income derived from productive work. Such a tax structure is often associated with a progressive income tax structure. Supporters argue that extraordinarily high incomes are unearned, citing the United Kingdom, where income taxes on the highest brackets reached 98% in 1979. In recent times the pendulum has swung the other way, and most Western countries tax unearned income more favourably than income from productive work for several reasons, including an expectation that much of this income ends up being recirculated into the economy, through things like spending or reinvestment.

Capital gains are a form of passive income some argue are unearned, though this is a great point of contention between all the various economic schools of thought. In the United States, long term capital gains (generally assets held more than 12 months) are taxed at the rate of 15%. Another contentious subject is patents and other forms of exclusive production rights, especially regarding biology and software.

While classical free market economists were generally skeptical towards unearned incomes, more recent economists, like Ronald Coase, claim that capital markets facilitate allocation of resources to those enterprises which will provide the best economic benefit, and that extra taxes on unearned income can interfere with these mechanisms. Progressives assert that the purpose of taxes is to allocate resources where they are most needed and to prevent a system in which capital is shifted upward at the expense of lower tax brackets.

== See also ==
- Deferred income – Term in accounting
- Earned income – Refundable tax credit for low-to-middle class individuals in the U.S.
- Economic rent – Difference between marginal product and opportunity cost
- FIRE economy – Segment of the economy: finance, insurance, real estate
- Landed gentry – British and Irish social class of wealthy land owners
- Passive income – Income that requires little to no effort to earn and maintain
- Property income – Income received by virtue of owning property
- Rentier capitalism – Capitalism featuring rent-seeking without wealth creation
- Surplus value – Concept in economics
- Windfall gain – Unusually high income that is sudden and/or unexpected
