= Oddingley murders =

1806 double murder

In June 1806, two murders took place in the small Worcestershire village of Oddingley. Although one was investigated immediately, the second was not discovered until twenty four years later, when it led to the surprise solution of the first. Although neither case resulted in a conviction they underlined the need for reform of the tithe system, a constant source of rural conflict; and reaffirmed the importance of the rule of law.

== 1806: The murders ==
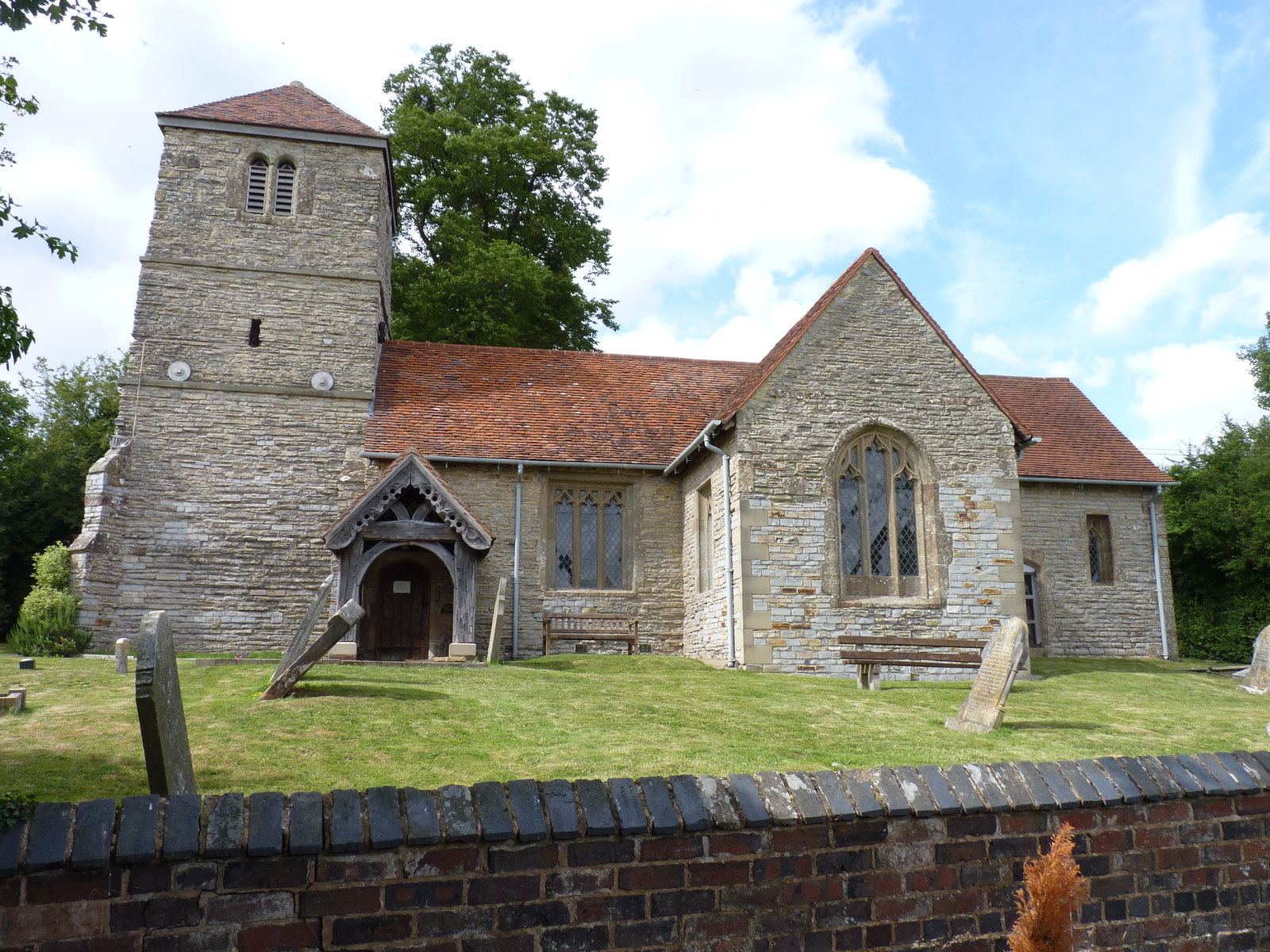
South facing view of St James's church, Oddingley

In the late afternoon of 24 June 1806 George Parker, Rector of Oddingley, was found in a glebe meadow in the village, dying from a gunshot wound to the stomach. The sound of a shot and a faint cry of 'Murder, murder!' had been heard by two travellers on a nearby road, who entered the field in time to see the assailant running away. From their description he was identified as Richard Heming, a local odd-job man not known to have any connection with the murdered vicar. A search failed to find Heming, who was rumoured to have fled to America.

Twenty-four years later a skeleton was discovered buried beside the wall of a barn at the nearby Netherwood Farm, and items found with it strongly suggested the remains were those of Heming. At the time of his disappearance a farmer named Thomas Clewes had held the lease of the farm. Clewes was arrested. In jail he confessed fully to having witnessed the death of Heming, detailed the circumstances in which he was murdered, and named the killers. The confession strongly implicated at least three substantial local farmers in a conspiracy to murder their late rector because of a long-running dispute about tithes. They had paid Richard Heming £50 to commit the crime, and then a day later Heming himself had been bludgeoned to death.

The original murder had been a significant news story but the discovery of the murderer's skeleton, followed by a confession which dramatically solved a 24-year-old mystery, raised it to national interest. The trial of Clewes, John Barnett and George Banks (the two surviving conspirators his confession had implicated) was confidently expected to result in a triple hanging.

== 1830: The trial ==
Despite these expectations, due to a legal technicality the three farmers could not be tried for the first death, the shooting of Parker. Under the law as it had stood in 1806 they might have been accessories to his murder but Heming, who fired the actual shot, had in law been the 'principal'. In 1806 accessories to murder could not be tried unless the principal was also tried, and although in the intervening period the law had been altered, the change had not been made retroactive. This meant the three men could only be charged with Parker's murder if Heming were so charged: and he was dead.

Furthermore, though in his confession Clewes had admitted sheltering the man he knew had murdered Parker, he swore the death of Heming had happened without either his foreknowledge or consent. The mastermind of the conspiracy against Parker had been a Captain Evans of Church Farm, a retired army officer and local magistrate, who had since died. Clewes claimed that the day after Parker's murder Evans had told him he must allow Heming to hide in his barn, and after Clewes reluctantly consented, Evans then told him to meet up at the barn at 11 o'clock that night 'to do something with him (Heming) to send him off'. When Clewes arrived Evans entered the barn along with a local bad character, a farrier called James Taylor, who had with him a heavy club-like instrument known as a 'blood stick' normally used to let blood from horses. In the dim light Evans called out 'Get up Heming I have got something for thee', and as Heming rose into a sitting position Taylor swung the blood stick, smashing his skull. The corpse was then hastily buried.

Clewes was charged with aiding and abetting Heming's murder, and the other two defendants similarly charged on the strength of his accusation. Apart from Clewes's confession there was little valid evidence: too long a time had elapsed, witnesses contradicted themselves on details and several significant persons, including the ringleader of the conspiracy Captain Evans, and Heming's actual killer James Taylor, had died.

Clewes's defence first argued that his confession was inadmissible, due to his having wrongly been promised a royal pardon by an inexperienced magistrate. This argument was rejected. They then countered that his confession, if accepted, must be accepted in its entirety - and in that case it nowhere showed foreknowledge of, or participation in, Heming's murder. On the contrary, Clewes' confession showed he had had no idea of what Evans and Taylor planned to do to Heming. Therefore, on the only reliable evidence before the court, Clewes was innocent of the only charge on which he was being tried - aiding and abetting the murder of Richard Heming.

The complexities of the case confused the jury, who initially brought in a verdict of 'guilty as accessory after the fact' - which was not the charge Clewes faced. Rebuked by the judge, they reconsidered and brought in a verdict of 'not guilty of aiding and abetting': and if there was not enough evidence to convict Clewes, then the two other men implicated solely on his accusation must also be released.

Thus, although it was generally accepted that the three defendants had conspired to have Parker killed, that two of them had at the least been present at the death of Heming, had not intervened to save him or remonstrated with his killers and had subsequently concealed the crime for a quarter of a century, all three returned quietly to private life.

=== Public response ===
Response to the acquittals was varied and to some extent class-based. In Oddingley it caused wild relief among at least some of the villagers who, while their current rector was absent, broke into the church and rang the bells in celebration. This perceived levity caused indignant comment in the press.

Over subsequent months newspaper editorials, while careful not to disagree with the verdict, generally took the view that in difficult circumstances an important principle of law had been upheld, even though guilt might not have been properly punished: 'He (Clewes) was acquitted in strict accordance with a known rule of law, and though the application of a general principle may...enable a great criminal to escape, it is far more consistent with the due application of justice that general and known rules exist.'

The then-popular author Mary Martha Sherwood, who was herself daughter of a Worcestershire rector and who had personally known some of those involved, wrote two studies of the case.

=== Tithes as a source of conflict ===
For a clergyman to be murdered was rare in Georgian England, but for his death to result from a conspiracy between a magistrate and yeomen farmers was unique. Although a clash of strong personalities contributed at Oddingley, the dysfunctional tithe system was the root of the conflict. Parker's income as rector came from his 'tithe', his right to a one-tenth share in everything the parish produced. At Oddingley as in most parishes farmers had switched to paying money annually rather than giving actual produce, but by 1800 there was often a mismatch between whatever long-agreed sum they gave as tithe, and the real value of a tenth of their crops. Parker's annual income from his tithes was £135, then a respectable amount; but one which had not altered for decades, while years of war had caused rampant inflation. After Parker tried to renegotiate his payment and the farmers refused, for several years he collected his tithes in kind. This procedure caused smouldering resentment and sometimes violence: when it did, Parker simply took the recalcitrant farmer to court. His stubborn refusal to be intimidated exasperated them and his success in gathering a tenth of their produce cost them money. After five years of attrition they were ready to yield the increase he had asked - but at this point Parker demanded a further sum of £150 compensation for costs incurred in collecting his tithes. With the resentful farmers under the sway of Captain Evans, an ex-military man already familiar with the process of delegating violence, a fairly commonplace quarrel over tithes ended in double murder.

== Notes ==
=== Further reading ===
- Flick, Carlos (1991). The Oddingley Murders. Newark: University of Delaware Press. ISBN 978-0874134179.

=== Sources ===
- Moore, Peter (2012). Damn His Blood. London: Chatto and Windus. ISBN 9780701186449.
