= Differential and absolute ground rent =

Economic concepts used by Karl Marx

Differential ground rent and absolute ground rent are concepts used by Karl Marx in the third volume of Das Kapital to explain how the capitalist mode of production would operate in agricultural production, under the condition where most agricultural land was owned by a social class of land-owners who could obtain rent income from farm production. Rent as an economic category is regarded by Marx as one form of surplus value just like net interest income, net production taxes and industrial profits. Marx's main texts on rent theory can be found in the second (edited) volume of Theories of Surplus Value and in Part 6 of Capital, Volume III. Anwar M. Shaikh states that "These remarkably rich and insightful sections of his work are seldom mentioned in the Marxian literature, and are even less understood."

== Aim of the theory ==
In good part, Marx's theory is a critique of David Ricardo's Law of rent, and it examines with detailed numerical examples how the relative profitability of capital investments in agriculture is affected by the productivity, fertility, and location of farmland, as well as by capital expenditure on land improvements. Ricardo conceptualized rent income essentially as an "unearned" income in excess of true production costs, and he analyzed how some farm owners could obtain such an extra profit because of farming conditions which were more favourable than elsewhere.

Marx aims to show that capitalism turns agriculture into a business like any other, operated for purely commercial motives; and that the absolute ground rents appropriated by landowners are a burden for the industrial bourgeoisie both because they imply an additional production-cost and because they raise the prices of agricultural output, leading the bourgeois to make a demand for nationalization of land. More specifically, Marx intended to show how the law of value governed capitalist farming, just like it governed capitalist industry.

The peculiarity of capitalism in agriculture is that commerce has to adapt to physical factors such as climate, altitude and soil quality, the relative inelasticity of agricultural supply, and the impact of bad harvests on international prices for farm products. Eventually, however, the production of farm products is completely reorganized according to the exchange-value of farm output – foodstuffs are then produced mainly according to their expected trading value in the market (this is not always completely true, e.g. because it may be feasible to cultivate only a limited variety of crops, or run a limited variety of cattle on particular lands, or because there is no perfect knowledge about what the market will do in the future, if there is great price volatility, climate uncertainty etc.).

== Law of value ==
According to Marx, the operation of the law of value and the formation of prices of production was modified in capitalist agriculture, because prices for farm output were co-determined by land yields and land ownership-rents quite independently of labor-productivity. For example, a poor harvest in a major agricultural region due to adverse weather conditions, or the monopolization of the supply of farmland, could have a big effect on world market prices for farm products. Marx extends his theory of agricultural rents to building rents and mine rents, and considers the effect of rent income on land prices.

== Theoretical significance ==
This theory is the least known part of Marx's economic writings, and among the more difficult ones, because earnings from farm production can be affected by many different variables, even at a highly abstract level of analysis. However the theory became very important to neo-Marxists such as Ernest Mandel and Cyrus Bina who interpreted late capitalism as a form of increasingly parasitic rentier capitalism in which surplus profits are obtained by capitalists from monopolising the access to resources, assets and technologies under conditions of imperfect competition. Marxist writers such as Cyrus Bina have extended the concept of rents to oil rents. Marx's insights about the theory of ground rent and surplus-profits (extra surplus-value) influence the theory of real capitalist competition created by Anwar M. Shaikh to complete and update what Marx set out to do.

== Rent in Macro-Economics ==
Another possible reason for the relative obscurity of the theory is that in modern macro-economic statistics and national accounts, no separate and comprehensive data are provided on the amounts of land rents and subsoil rents charged and earned, because they are not officially regarded as part of value-added, and consequently are not included in the calculation of GDP (except for the value of productive lease contracts). The tax data on land transactions are unreliable because of valuation inconsistencies.

The underlying conceptual argument in national accounts is, simply put, that such rents do not reflect earnings generated by production and are unrelated to production, and consequently that such earnings do not make a net addition to the value of new output. Implicitly, therefore, many land rents are treated as if they are a transfer of income. Typically only the annual value of expenditure on land improvements and the value of leases of productive equipment are recorded as "productive", value-adding earnings.

In Marx's theory, however, land rents do not simply reflect a property income gained from the ownership of an asset, but are a real element of surplus value and consequently of the value product, insofar as those rents are a flow of earnings which must be paid out of the new value created by the current production of primary products on the land. Such rents are according to Marx, part of the total cost-structure of capitalist production, and a component of the value of agricultural output.

== Forms of differential ground rent ==
Suppose for example that the ruling world market price for quality wheat is about US$350 per tonne f.o.b. Even if two investors have the exactly same amount of capital to invest in wheat production, the economics of producing wheat at that price are going to be quite different, depending on the actual yields (the productivity) of the land they use. The same amount of money invested in wheat production on area A yields a bigger crop of wheat and more profit than on area B, if A is more productive, fertile, better situated etc. than B.

But not only that – given a known yield per hectare and a known price per ton of wheat, it may be either economic or uneconomic to produce wheat on particular soils. There exists a “hierarchy of soil types”, and if market demand and prices rise, more of the less productive (or marginal) land may be cultivated; if demand and prices fall, less of the marginal land may be cultivated.

=== Differential rent I ===
That situation is the basis of what Marx calls "Differential rent I". It means that the investor who places capital to produce wheat on the more productive lands reaps an extra-profit or rent for his capital, on that land. This rent, of course, varies according to the total supply and demand of wheat and the ruling market price for wheat.

However, the income from wheat production will also depend not just on soil quality but on the number of hectares of each kind of soil being cultivated. Thus the supply of wheat and the wheat price, and consequently the rents obtained from their fluctuation, will also be influenced by e.g. whether the expansion of wheat production in response to growing demand occurs on better or worse soils.

=== Differential Rent II ===
In addition, the profitability and productivity of wheat production may also be influenced by the ‘’actual amount of capital invested per acre’’. Marx calls this Differential rent II and he examines what would be the effect of more capital-intensive agriculture when the production price remains stable, and when it falls, while the extra yield from additional capital investments varies.

=== Summary ===
The theory of Differential rent I shows how extra profit is transformed into rent by equal quantities of capital being invested on different lands of unequal productivity, while the theory of Differential Rent II refers to the difference in profitability resulting from unequal amounts of capital being invested successively and intensively on different plots of land of the same type. Differential rent II implies the appropriation of surplus profits created by temporary differences in yield, which are due to the application of unequal capitals to the same type of lands.

== Absolute ground rent ==
The absolute ground rent is sometimes explained as the rent which landowners can extract because they monopolise the access to or supply of land, and sometimes as the rent which arises due to the difference between the product-values and prices of production of output in agriculture, because of a lower than average organic composition of capital in agriculture as compared with industry.

According to Marx's own concept, absolute rent cannot exist when the organic composition of capital in agriculture becomes higher than the social average. Marx envisaged that labour productivity would be higher in manufacturing than in agriculture, for the longer term, reflecting the fact that the organic composition of capital (the ratio C/V) was higher in manufacturing than in agriculture. This implied, that in agriculture the value of output produced was persistently higher than the production price of that output.

== Physiocratic school ==
Another definition for ground rent or absolute ground rent originates from the 18th-century French school of political economy called the Physiocrats. They sought to bring logical analysis to bear on governmental questions. They arrived at the conclusion that "ground rents" should be the source of most or all taxes. They defined ground rent as that portion of all rent which is attributable only to the size and location of the parcel. For instance, say you own a parcel of land. If everything you grew or built on that land burned . . . then you could still lease it out for its ground rent (its locational value). The Physiocrats noted that the owner is in no way responsible for any increase in the "locational" value of his parcel. A particular location is only made more valuable because more people come to live around it. Since it is society as a whole which gives ground rent its value . . . they reasoned that society should regain part of that value in tax revenue.

== See also ==
- Economic rent
- Law of Rent
- Superprofit
- Surplus value
- Value product
- Rentier state
- Rentier capitalism
