= Schumpeterian rent =

Concept in economics

In economics, Schumpeterian rents are earned by innovators and occur during the period of time between the introduction of an innovation and its successful diffusion. It is expected that successful innovations, in time, will be imitated, but until that occurs, the innovator will earn Schumpeterian rents. They were named after economist Joseph Schumpeter, who saw profits made by businesses as resulting from the development of new processes which disturb economic equilibrium, temporarily raising revenues above their resource costs. This type of profit is also called entrepreneurial rent.

Schumpeterian rent is seen as a form of economic rent, although Schumpeterian rent may be seen as an incentive towards greater economic efficiency.

== Karl Marx ==
In Marxian economics, the equivalent to Schumpeterian rent is the extra surplus value that is extracted from the laborer during the rise of local productivity, meaning the development of the productive forces through innovation owned by the respective capitalist, while all other enterprises are left with yet undeveloped productive forces. The result is the rise of the local rate of profit, as the respective commodity is now produced cheaper by this enterprise alone, yet can still be sold for its general market price. In Marxian theory, the earning of extra surplus value is what drives and guides the capitalist, and thus capitalism itself.

== William Nordhaus ==
The Nobel prize-winning William Nordhaus wrote a paper in 2004 analyzing Schumpeterian profits in the American economy. This paper included the equations used to define Schumpeterian profits. He went on to construct an economic model to estimate these profits for the nonfarm business economy over the 1948 – 2001 period. He concluded that:

...Only a minuscule fraction of the social returns from technological advances over the 1948 – 2001 period was captured by producers, indicating that most of the benefits of technological change are passed on to consumers rather than captured by producers.

He concluded:

Using data from the US nonfarm business section, I estimate that innovators are able to capture about 2.2% of the total social surplus from innovation

== The value of the entrepreneurial rent and compensation for entrepreneurship ==
Magnus Henrekson, professor of economics and president of the Research Institute of Industrial Economics (IFN) in Stockholm, wrote a paper about the value of entrepreneurial rent in 2017. He wanted to show that entrepreneurship can be thoroughly analyzed by positing that entrepreneurs are searching for rates of return exceeding the risk-adjusted market rate of return. His main findings were that searching for and creating entrepreneurial rents gives rise to supernormal profits in short to medium term. But In the longer term, these rents are growing to society as cheaper and better products. Entrepreneurial rents are crucial for innovation and development, which play the leading role in generating economic growth.

== See also ==
- First-mover advantage
- Creative destruction
