= Book Stacks Unlimited =

- Industry: Online bookstore
- Founded: 1992
- Founder: Charles M. Stack
- Headquarters: United State
- Area served: Worldwide
- Website: www.books.com (now owned by Barnes & Noble)

Book Stacks Unlimited was an American online bookstore created by Charles M. Stack in 1992, three years before Jeff Bezos launched Amazon.com. Stack's store, selling new books, began as a dial-up bulletin board located in Cleveland. The Books.com website opened in 1994, eventually attracting a half million visitors each month.

== History ==
Stack devised the concept in 1991, based on his personal fascination with reading and books, as he recalled in 1998:

I've always read a lot, so that was the germ of the idea. I'll pick a subject and read every book ever published on it. That's hard to do if you shop at a walk-in bookstore. Even the superstores don't have more than a couple of titles per topic. My dream was to have a bookstore that had every book ever published to feed my own habit.

Offering 500,000 titles, Book Stacks had 35 staffers who gave their book recommendations to visitors. Other features included a daily literary journal, summaries of new books, RealAudio interviews with authors and forums in which customers could ask questions and discuss books. Books could be searched by title, author, subject, keyword or ISBN.

In 1996, Book Stacks became a wholly owned subsidiary of Cendant Corporation, a consumer services company based in Stamford, Connecticut, and previously known as CUC International. In 1997, Book Stacks became part of Cendant's virtual mall, netMarket, a one-stop Internet shopping site which included an online music store and an online video store, both operating from the Book Stacks offices in downtown Cleveland. The books.com url was subsequently sold to Barnes & Noble; www.books.com now redirects to www.barnesandnoble.com.

== See also ==
- Argosy Book Store
