= FIRE economy =

Segment of the economy: finance, insurance, real estate

A FIRE economy is any economy based primarily on the finance, insurance, and real estate sectors. Finance, insurance, and real estate are United States Census Bureau classifications. Barry Popik describes some early uses as far back as 1982. Since 2008, the term has been commonly used by Michael Hudson and Eric Janszen. It is New York City's largest industry and a prominent part of the service industry in the United States overall economy and other Western developed countries.

== Census Bureau classification ==
This term is frequently used in the financial press and blogs. Its origin is in the realm of North American industrial classification. "Finance, Insurance, and Real Estate" is the title of 1992 U.S. Census Bureau Standard Industrial Classification (SIC) Division H. Its coverage was "All domestic establishments that provide financial, insurance, or real estate services." Its coverage was elaborated in two-digit SIC codes 60 through 67. The SIC was replaced by the North American (Canada, US, Mexico) Industry Classification System (NAICS) starting in 1997. The SIC had ten top-level divisions, NAICS has twenty. The new NAICS essentially split the old Division H into code 52 Finance and Insurance and code 53 Real Estate and Rental and Leasing.

The newer NAIC two-digit codes, 52 and 53, are extensively elaborated – down to the five-digit level. They remain largely unchanged in the 2007 NAICS drill down chart whose details are this for code 52 and this for code 53.

The second use of the term derives from the study of financial capital and income – as opposed to industrial capital and income. To characterize the so-called financial services industries, economists carved out part of the SIC/NAIS breakdown of types of industry: finance, insurance, and real estate. They contracted this to FIRE, deliberately invoking the negative connotations which were, at least then, contrary to conventional wisdom. The following table elaborates on this dichotomy in the header row and gives examples in ensuing rows [data missing].

At the city scale, Sassen has done a lot of researches of the FIRE influences to the Global Cities, such New York, London and Tokyo, since 1984. She and a group of scholars including Feistein, argued that FIRE aggravated social inequality and polarization of these cities.

== Criticisms ==
Much criticism exists on the shifting of the US economy to a FIRE economy at the expense of a manufacturing and export-based economy. As the consumer of last resort, many believe that the United States has eschewed productive elements of its economy in favor of consumption to its long term detriment:

Particularly after 1973 [...] pundits of the status quo hailed the proliferation of the "FIRE" (finance, insurance, real estate) economy as the coming of a new "service" "post-industrial" economy that would replace the old "smokestack" economy and the jobs lost through plant closings, restructuring, and down-sizing [...].

== See also ==
- Boomburbs
- Edge city
- Exurb
- Financialization
