= Factor price =

Economic theory

In economic theory, a factor price is the unit cost of using a factor of production, such as labor or physical capital.

There has been much debate as to what determines factor prices. Classical and Marxist economists argue that factor prices decided the value of a product and therefore the value is intrinsic within the product. For this reason, the term 'natural price' is often used instead.

Marginalist economists argue that the factor price is a function of the demand for the final product, and so they are imputed from the finished product. The theory of imputation was first expounded by the Austrian economist Friedrich von Wieser.

== See also ==
- Economic theory
- Economics
- Factors of production
- Inflation
