= Frank Fetter =

American economist (1863–1949)

- Born: Frank Albert Fetter; March 8, 1863; Peru, Indiana, U.S.
- Died: March 21, 1949 (aged 86); Princeton, New Jersey, U.S.
- Children: Frank Whitson Fetter

Academic background
- Influences: Menger · Jevons · Wieser · Böhm-Bawerk · Henry George · John Bates Clark

Academic work
- Discipline: Economics, history, political economy, distribution theory, imputation
- School or tradition: Austrian School

Frank Albert Fetter (/ˈfɛtər/; March 8, 1863 – March 21, 1949) was an American economist of the Austrian School. Fetter's treatise, The Principles of Economics, contributed to an increased American interest in the Austrian School, including the theories of Eugen von Böhm-Bawerk, Friedrich von Wieser, and Ludwig von Mises.

Fetter notably debated Alfred Marshall, presenting a theoretical reassessment of land as capital. Fetter's arguments have been credited with prompting mainstream economists to abandon the Georgist idea "that land is a unique factor of production and hence that there is any special need for a special theory of ground rent...." A proponent of the subjective theory of value, Fetter emphasized the importance of time preference and rebuffed Irving Fisher for abandoning the pure time preference theory of interest that Fisher had earlier espoused in his 1907 book, The Rate of Interest.

== Early life and education ==
Frank Fetter was born in Peru, Indiana to a Quaker family during the height of the American Civil War. Fetter proved an able student as a youth, as demonstrated by his acceptance to Indiana University in 1879 when he was only sixteen years old. At Indiana, he joined the Phi Kappa Psi fraternity. Fetter was on track to graduate with the class of 1883, but left college to run his family's bookstore upon news of his father's declining health. Working in the bookstore offered an opportunity for the young man to acquaint himself with some of the economic ideas that would later prove formative. Chief among the intellectual influences Fetter encountered at this time was Henry George's Progress and Poverty (1879).

After eight years, Fetter returned to academia and finally completed his B.A. in 1891. In 1892, Jeremiah W. Jenks—who had taught Fetter at Indiana University—acquired a teaching position at Cornell University at the new President White School of History and Political Science and subsequently secured a fellowship for Fetter at that institution. Fetter completed his Master of Philosophy degree the same year. Jenks then convinced Fetter to study, as Jenks himself had, under Johannes Conrad at the Sorbonne in Paris, France. Fetter earned his Ph.D. in 1894 from the University of Halle in Germany, where he wrote his doctoral dissertation, a critique of Malthusian population theory.

== Professional life ==
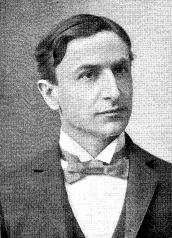
Frank Fetter as a young man, pictured in The American Economic Review

After earning his doctoral degree, Fetter accepted an instructorship at Cornell, but quickly left after being offered a position as a professor at Indiana University. In 1898, Stanford University lured him away from Indiana, but Fetter resigned from Stanford three years later over a dispute regarding academic freedom. After leaving Stanford in 1901, Fetter went back to Cornell, where he remained for ten years. In 1911, he again found himself in professional transition, accepting the position of chairman in an interdisciplinary department at Princeton University which incorporated history, politics, and economics. Fetter was the first chairman of Princeton University's Department of Economics and Social institutions.

Despite his ideological proximity and personal rapport with eminent Austrian School economists such as Eugen von Böhm-Bawerk and Friedrich von Wieser, as well as his favorable reviews of works by Ludwig von Mises and F.A. Hayek, Fetter referred to himself, Thorstein Veblen, and Herbert J. Davenport more specifically as being members of the "American Psychological School." The appellation "Psychological School" is now generally considered to be synonymous with "Austrian School."

Fetter was a staunch opponent of Franklin D. Roosevelt's plan to end the gold standard and worked with other economists in lobbying against the move to a fiat currency. As some indication of Fetter's role in these efforts,

In January 1933, a letter was sent to the president-elect, urging him not only to lower tariff barriers to revive international trade, but to maintain the gold standard "unflinchingly." The letter was signed by a number of prominent "traditional" economists, headed by the American "Austrian," Frank A. Fetter, of Princeton.

== Theoretical contributions in economics ==
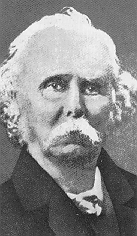
Alfred Marshall (1842–1924)

=== Land as capital ===
Fetter participated in a notable debate with English economist Alfred Marshall, both through his 1904 Principles of Economics and a number of journal articles in the American Economic Association's journals and in the Quarterly Journal of Economics. He contested Marshall's position that land is theoretically distinct from capital. Fetter argued that such a distinction was impractical, stating that,

The notion that it is a simple matter to distinguish between the yield of natural agents and that of improvements is fanciful and confusing.... The objective classification of land and capital as natural and artificial agents is a task that always must transcend the human power of discrimination.

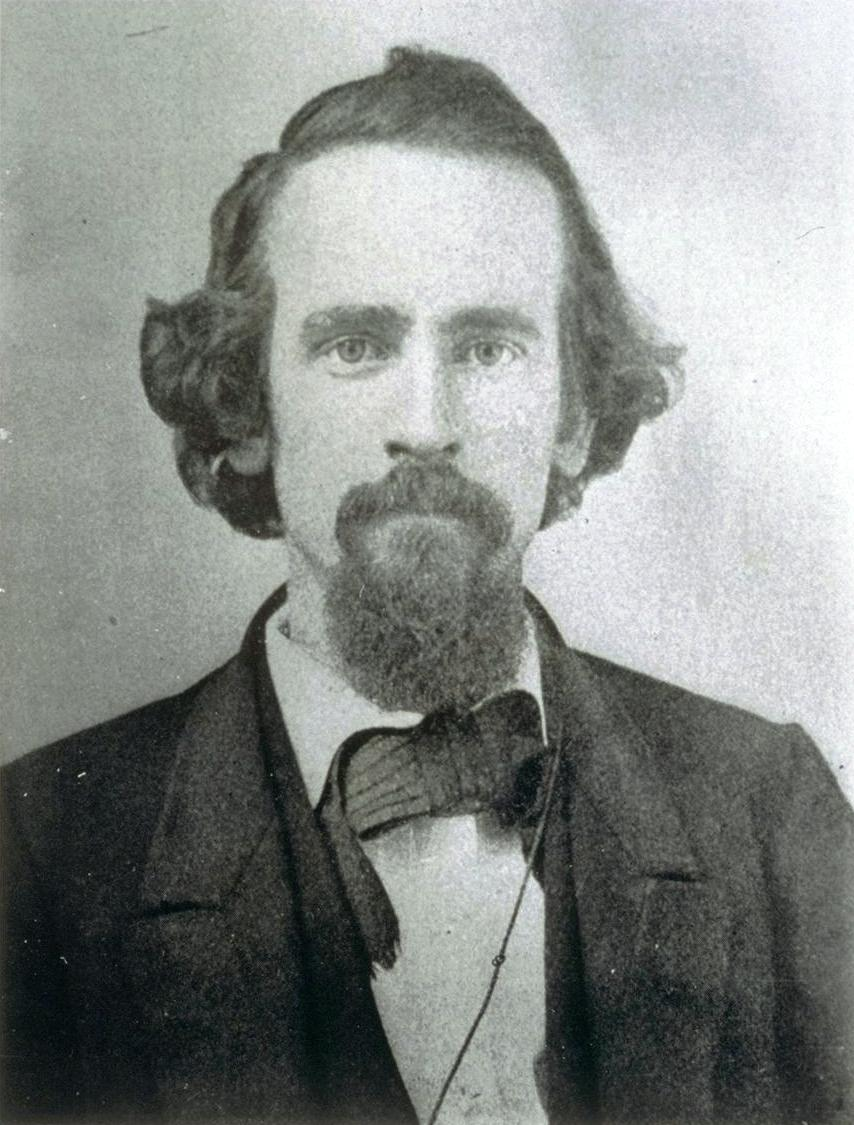
Henry George (1839–1897)

Fetter's stand on this issue further led him to oppose Georgist ideas like the land value tax. Mark Blaug, a specialist in the history of economic thought, credits Fetter and John Bates Clark with influencing mainstream economists to abandon the idea "that land is a unique factor of production and hence that there is any special need for a special theory of ground rent.... This is in fact the basis of all the attacks on Henry George by contemporary economists and certainly the fundamental reason why professional economists increasingly ignored him."

=== Applications of subjective value theory ===
Fetter believed in the subjective theory of value, and thus supported a pure time preference theory of interest. Richard Ebeling wrote that Fetter "constructed a consistent theory of value, price, cost, and production in the context of emphasizing the time-valuational element in all consumption and production choices." According to Jeffrey Herbener, Fetter asserted that "just as the price of each consumer good is determined solely by subjective value, the rate of interest is determined solely by time preference."

Likewise, Herbener explains, this led Fetter to also conclude that "[t]he rental price of each producer good is imputed to it by entrepreneurial demand and is equal to its discounted marginal value product. The capital value of each durable good is equal to the discounted value of its future rents." Fetter's contribution to the Austrian subjectivist tradition, then, is that he "showed how this uniform, subjective theory of value implies the demise of socialist theories of labor exploitation, Ricardian theories of rent, and productivity theories of interest."

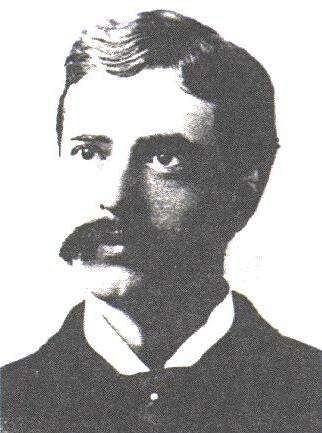
Irving Fisher (1867–1947)

=== Criticism of Fisher's theory of interest ===
In "Interest Theories, Old and New" (1914), Fetter criticized Irving Fisher for abandoning the pure time preference theory of interest that Fisher had earlier espoused in his 1907 book, The Rate of Interest, a tome which had heavily influenced Fetter. As Murray Rothbard recounts, upon further review of Fisher's earlier work,

...Fetter discovered that the seeds of error were in Fisher's publication of 1907. Fisher had stated that valuations of present and future goods imply a preexisting money rate of interest, thereby suggesting that a pure time-preference explanation of interest involves circular reasoning. By way of contrast, and in the course of explaining his own pure time-preference, or "capitalization," theory of interest, Fetter showed that time valuation is prerequisite to the determination of the market rate of interest.

== Reception in academia ==
In 1909, at the age of forty-six, Fetter was awarded an honorary LL.D. from Colgate University, and he was made president of the American Economic Association in 1913. Additional honorary doctoral degrees were conferred on Fetter by Occidental College in 1930 and Indiana University in 1934. He was a fellow of the American Academy of Arts and Sciences and a member of the American Philosophical Society. In 1927, he was awarded the Karl Menger Medal by the Austrian Economic Society.

Fetter's treatise, Principles of Economics (1904), has been described by Herbener as "unsurpassed until Ludwig von Mises's treatise of 1940, Nationaloekonomie." In Rothbard's preface to the 1977 edition of Fetter's Capital, Interest, and Rent, he notes that he was first introduced to Fetter's work via a citation in Mises' Human Action and describes Fetter's views on interest and rent as being "Austrian" and influential on his own views.

...while reading Fetter's oeuvre in the course of writing my Man, Economy, and State... I was struck by the brilliance and consistency of his integrated theory of distribution and by the neglect of Fetter in current histories of economic thought, even by those that are Austrian oriented. For Fetter's systematic theory, while challenging and original (particularly his theories of interest and rent), was emphatically in the Austrian school tradition.

Upon Fetter's death in 1949, J. Douglas Brown, who would later be named Provost of Princeton University, wrote a "Memorial" to Fetter for the American Economic Review. He opened the tribute with the announcement that "with the death of Frank Albert Fetter the great company of American economists has suffered an irreparable loss."

== Books ==
- Versuch einer Bevölkerungslehre ausgehend von einer Kritik des Malthus'schen Bevölkerungsprinzips (Translation: "An Essay on Population Doctrine based on a Critique of the Population Principles of Malthus"). Jena: Gustav Fischer, 1894.
- The Principles of Economics. The Principles of Economics, With Applications to Practical Problems New York: The Century Co., 1905
- Source Book in Economics. New York: The Century Co., 1912.
- Economics, Volume 1: Economic Principles. Economic Principles New York: The Century Co., 1915.
- Manual of References and Exercises in Economics for Use with, Vol. 1: Economic Principles. New York: The Century Co., 1916.
- Economics, Vol. 2: Modern Economic Problems. Modern Economic Problems New York: The Century Co., 1916. Revised 2nd edition, 1922.
- Manual of References and Exercises in Economics for Use with, Vol. 2: Modern Economics. New York: The Century Co., 1917.
- Masquerade of Monopoly. New York: Harcourt, Brace & Co., 1931.
- Capital, Interest and Rent: Essays in the theory of distribution. Capital, Interest, and Rent: Essays in the Theory of Distribution Institute for Humane Studies. Kansas City: Sheed Andrews and McMeel, Inc., 1977.

== Articles ==
- "Recent Discussion of the Capital Concept " by Frank A. Fetter, Quarterly Journal of Economics, (1900)
