= Imputed income =

Accession to wealth

Imputed income is the accession to wealth that can be attributed, or imputed, to a person when they avoid paying for services by providing the services to themselves, or when the person avoids paying rent for durable goods by owning the durable goods, as in the case of imputed rent.

== Taxation of imputed income ==
In many countries, such as the United States, tax imputed income happens only in certain limited situations. Imputed income is often difficult to measure, and tax policies regarding imputed income can have political consequences. For taxpayers, not taxing imputed income creates a tax incentive in favor of owning over renting, and in favor of self-service over hiring. For the economy, not taxing imputed income directs economic activity away from activities associated with extreme and severe division of labor.

=== Durable property ===
Home ownership is an example of an instance involving imputed income from durable property. If someone lives in their own property, they forgo the rental income on this property in exchange for not owing an equivalent amount of rent to someone else. In effect, they are paying rent to their mortgage lender. They also avoid paying income taxes on a portion of that rental income. (In the specific example of home ownership in the United States, this effect is emphasized by allowing home owners to deduct a certain level of their interest payments—but not mortgage principal payments—on home mortgage debts when computing taxable income for U.S. federal income tax purposes.)

=== Personal services ===
An example of imputed income in connection with personal services is the situation where a stay-at-home parent is not taxed on wages that the family implicitly "pays" them for their services. If they were working for compensation, the wages they might pay a hired employee would be taxed. This is a systemic partiality that is inevitable in any income tax; the tax favors "leisure" (including self-rendered benefits such as shaving and mowing one's own lawn) over "work" (services sold on the market for remuneration). The concept of imputing income is logically extendable to any service people perform for themselves, such as cooking their own meals, washing their own laundry, or even bathing themselves.

=== Legal application in the United States ===
In dicta in 1934, the Supreme Court touched on the issue of the constitutionality of taxing imputed income:

If the statute lays taxes on the part of the building occupied by the owner or upon the rental value of that space, it cannot be sustained, for that would be to lay a direct tax requiring apportionment. The rental value of the building used by the owner does not constitute income within the meaning of the Sixteenth Amendment.

Whether the U.S. Supreme Court of the present day would conclude that there is a constitutional prohibition of imputed income is unknown.

Even though the Internal Revenue Code has no provision establishing an exclusion, most types of imputed income are not treated as income for U.S. federal income tax purposes. In 1985, in a discussion of "in kind" income, Professor William D. Andrews, a tax law professor at Harvard Law School, wrote:

Another form of income in kind does not even involve a receipt: it is the imputed income that results from the investment of capital or performance of services for one's own personal or family use. No effort has ever been made to tax imputed income generally, and its omission represents such a settled interpretation that any substantial inclusion of such income now would require legislation.

Regarding the non-taxability of imputed income from the performance of household services under U.S. federal income tax law, Professor Andrews wrote: "...it is commonly considered that difficulties of valuation would interpose an insuperable obstacle to any direct inclusion of such items in taxable income." Commentators Burke and Friel have written: "The exclusion is rather a matter of administrative practice, but no less firmly established for that reason."

Regarding the imputed income from the rental value in connection with living in one's own home, Professor Andrews wrote that such income "has never been included in taxable income in the United States."

On rare occasions, issues concerning imputed income have arisen with regard to working to provide for oneself. At least one court has ruled that the imputed income in connection with produce grown and eaten by a farm owner is not taxable as income to the farmer.

Similarly, the U.S. federal income tax law does not tax the imputed income consisting of the benefit one obtains from leisure. Professor Andrews wrote: "It would undoubtedly be impractical to try to reflect either the value of leisure or the cost of its sacrifice directly in taxable income."

== See also ==
- Implied level of government service
- Rational economic exchange
- Taxation in the United States
- Theory of imputation
