= Principles of Economics (Menger book) =

Book by Carl Menger (1871)

- Author: Carl Menger
- Original title: Grundsätze der Volkswirtschaftslehre
- Language: German
- Subject: Economics
- Genre: Non-fiction, Treatise
- Publisher: Braumüller
- Publication date: 1871
- Publication place: Austria
- English publication date: 1950
- Media type: Print (Hardback & Paperback)
- Pages: 285
- OCLC: 271580456

Principles of Economics (German: Grundsätze der Volkswirtschaftslehre; 1871) is a book by economist Carl Menger which is credited with the founding of the Austrian School of economics. It was one of the first modern treatises to advance the theory of marginal utility.

== Summary ==
Menger advanced his theory that the marginal utility of goods, rather than labor inputs, is the source of their value. This marginalist theory solved the diamond–water paradox that had been puzzling classical economists: the fact that mankind finds diamonds to be far more valuable than water although water is far more important.

Menger stressed uncertainty in the making of economic decisions, rather than relying on "Homo economicus" or the rational man who was fully informed of all circumstances impinging on his decisions. This was a deviation from classical and neoclassical economic thought. Menger asserted that such perfect knowledge never exists, and that therefore all economic activity implies risk. The entrepreneurs' role was to collect and evaluate information and to act on those risks.

Menger saw that time was the root of uncertainty within economics. As production takes time then producers have no certainty on the supply or demand for their product. Thus the price of the finished product bears no resemblance to the costs of production, since the two represent market conditions at very different points in time.

The labour theory of value was the explanation that had been reached by Adam Smith among others, and the Marxist school of economics still relies on this theory. The labour theory of value was that the value of an object was reliant on the labour that had gone into producing it, including any training or investment that supplemented the labour.

According to neoclassical economists the labour theory of value could not explain fluctuating values for different kinds of labour, nor did it explain how found goods could be more valuable than extracted goods.

As the price of a commodity is the average cost of production, it includes the fact that a tiny proportion of commodities may be found, although finding goods is hardly typical of modern manufacturing processes.

Marginal utility as the source of value meant that the perceived need for an object was seen to be dictating the value, on an individual rather than a general level. The implication was that the individual mind is the source of economic value.

Although Menger accepted the marginal utility theory, he made deviations from the work of other neoclassical pioneers. Most importantly he fundamentally rejected the use of mathematical methods insisting that the function of economics was to investigate the essences rather than the specific quantities of economic phenomena.

== Reception ==
Ludwig von Mises called the book the best introduction to the Austrian School of economics.

== See also ==
- History of economic thought
