= Marginalism =

Concept in economics

Marginalism is a theory of economics that attempts to explain the discrepancy in the value of goods and services by reference to their secondary, or marginal, utility. For example, it states that the reason why the price of diamonds is higher than that of water owes to the greater additional satisfaction of the diamonds over the water. Thus, while the water has greater total utility, the diamond has greater marginal utility.

Although the central concept of marginalism is marginal utility, marginalists, following the work of Alfred Marshall, drew upon the idea of marginal physical productivity in explanation of cost. The concept of marginalism came from Carl Menger, William Stanley Jevons, and Leon Walras when resolving the Diamond-Water Paradox propounded by Adam Smith by distinguishing between total utility and marginal utility. The neoclassical tradition that emerged from British marginalism abandoned the concept of utility and gave marginal rates of substitution a more fundamental role in analysis. Marginalism is an integral part of mainstream economic theory.

== Main concepts ==
=== Marginality ===
For issues of marginality, constraints are conceptualized as a border or margin. The location of the margin for any individual corresponds to their endowment, broadly conceived to include opportunities. This endowment is determined by many things including physical laws (which constrain how forms of energy and matter may be transformed), accidents of nature (which determine the presence of natural resources), and the outcomes of past decisions made both by others and by the individual.

A value that holds true given particular constraints is a marginal value. A change that would be affected as or by a specific loosening or tightening of those constraints is a marginal change.

Neoclassical economics usually assumes that marginal changes are infinitesimals or limits. Although this assumption makes the analysis less robust, it increases tractability. One is therefore often told that "marginal" is synonymous with "very small", though in more general analysis this may not be operationally true and would not in any case be literally true. Frequently, economic analysis concerns the marginal values associated with a change of one unit of a resource, because decisions are often made in terms of units; marginalism seeks to explain unit prices in terms of such marginal values.

=== Marginal use ===
The marginal use of a good or service is the specific use to which an agent would put a given increase, or the specific use of the good or service that would be abandoned in response to a given decrease.

Marginalism assumes, for any given agent, economic rationality and an ordering of possible states-of-the-world, such that, for any given set of constraints, there is an attainable state which is best in the eyes of that agent. Descriptive marginalism asserts that choice amongst the specific means by which various anticipated specific states-of-the-world (outcomes) might be affected is governed only by the distinctions amongst those specific outcomes; prescriptive marginalism asserts that such choice ought to be so governed.

On such assumptions, each increase would be put to the specific, feasible, previously unrealized use of greatest priority, and each decrease would result in abandonment of the use of lowest priority amongst the uses to which the good or service had been put.

=== Marginal utility ===
The marginal utility of a good or service is the utility of its marginal use. Under the assumption of economic rationality, it is the utility of its least urgent possible use from the best feasible combination of actions in which its use is included.

In 20th century mainstream economics, the term "utility" has come to be formally defined as a quantification capturing preferences by assigning greater quantities to states, goods, services, or applications that are of higher priority. But marginalism and the concept of marginal utility predate the establishment of this convention within economics. The more general conception of utility is that of use or usefulness, and this conception is at the heart of marginalism; the term "marginal utility" arose from translation of the German "Grenznutzen", which literally means border use, referring directly to the marginal use, and the more general formulations of marginal utility do not treat quantification as an essential feature. On the other hand, none of the early marginalists insisted that utility were not quantified, some indeed treated quantification as an essential feature, and those who did not still used an assumption of quantification for expository purposes. In this context, it is not surprising to find many presentations that fail to recognize a more general approach.

==== Quantified marginal utility ====
Under the special case in which usefulness can be quantified, the change in utility of moving from state $S_1$ to state $S_2$ is

$$\Delta U=U(S_2)-U(S_1)\,$$

Moreover, if $S_1$ and $S_2$ are distinguishable by values of just one variable $g\,$ which is itself quantified, then it becomes possible to speak of the ratio of the marginal utility of the change in $g\,$ to the size of that change:

$$\left.\frac{\Delta U}{\Delta g}\right|_{c.p.}$$

(where "c.p." indicates that the only independent variable to change is $g\,$).

Mainstream neoclassical economics will typically assume that

$$\lim_{\Delta g\to 0}{\left.\frac{\Delta U}{\Delta g}\right|_{c.p.}}$$

is well defined, and use "marginal utility" to refer to a partial derivative

$$\frac{\partial U}{\partial g}\approx\left.\frac{\Delta U}{\Delta g}\right|_{c.p.}$$

==== Law of diminishing marginal utility ====
The law of diminishing marginal utility, also known as a Gossen's First Law, is that ceteris paribus, as additional amounts of a good or service are added to available resources, their marginal utilities are decreasing. This law is sometimes treated as a tautology, sometimes as something proven by introspection, or sometimes as a mere instrumental assumption, adopted only for its perceived predictive efficacy. It is not quite any of these things, although it may have aspects of each. The law does not hold under all circumstances, so it is neither a tautology nor otherwise proveable; but it has a basis in prior observation.

An individual will typically be able to partially order the potential uses of a good or service. If there is scarcity, then a rational agent will satisfy wants of highest possible priority, so that no want is avoidably sacrificed to satisfy a want of lower priority. In the absence of complementarity across the uses, this will imply that the priority of use of any additional amount will be lower than the priority of the established uses, as in this famous example:

A pioneer farmer had five sacks of grain, with no way of selling them or buying more. He had five possible uses: as basic feed for himself, food to build strength, food for his chickens for dietary variation, an ingredient for making whisky and feed for his parrots to amuse him. Then the farmer lost one sack of grain. Instead of reducing every activity by a fifth, the farmer simply starved the parrots as they were of less utility than the other four uses; in other words they were on the margin. And it is on the margin, and not with a view to the big picture, that we make economic decisions.

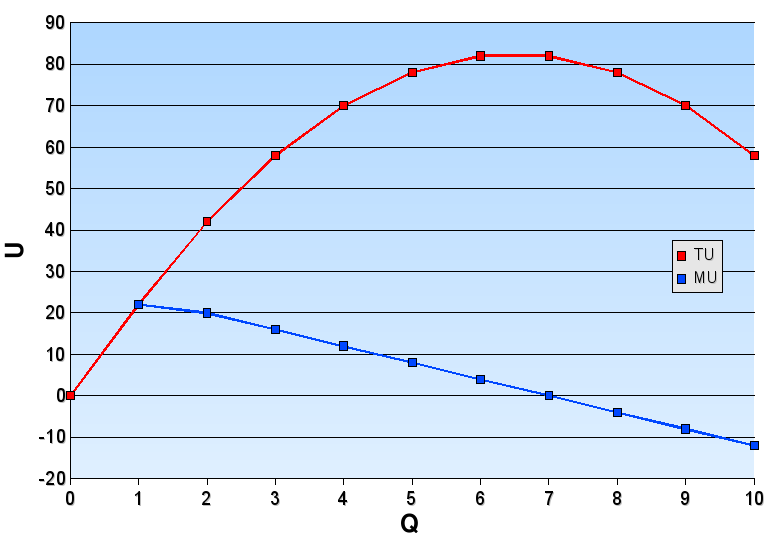
Diminishing marginal utility, given quantification

However, if there is a complementarity across uses, then an amount added can bring things past a desired tipping point, or an amount subtracted cause them to fall short. In such cases, the marginal utility of a good or service might actually be increasing.

Without the presumption that utility is quantified, the diminishing of utility should not be taken to be itself an arithmetic subtraction. It is the movement from use of higher to lower priority, and may be no more than a purely ordinal change.

When quantification of utility is assumed, diminishing marginal utility corresponds to a utility function whose slope is continually or continuously decreasing. In the latter case, if the function is also smooth, then the law may be expressed as

$$\frac{\partial^2 U}{\partial g^2}<0$$

Neoclassical economics usually supplements or supplants discussion of marginal utility with indifference curves, which were originally derived as the level curves of utility functions, or can be produced without presumption of quantification, but are often simply treated as axiomatic. In the absence of complementarity of goods or services, diminishing marginal utility implies convexity of indifference curves, although such convexity would also follow from quasiconcavity of the utility function.

=== Marginal rate of substitution ===
The rate of substitution is the least favorable rate at which an agent is willing to exchange units of one good or service for units of another. The marginal rate of substitution (MRS) is the rate of substitution at the margin; in other words, given some constraint.

When goods and services are discrete, the least favorable rate at which an agent would trade A for B will usually be different from that at which she would trade B for A:

$$MRS_{AB} \neq \frac1{MRS_{BA}}$$

When the goods and services are continuously divisible in the limiting case

$$MRS_{AB} = \frac1{MRS_{BA}}$$

and the marginal rate of substitution is the slope of the indifference curve (multiplied by $-1$).

If, for example, Lisa will not trade a goat for anything less than two sheep, then her

$$MRS_{SG} = \frac{2\text{ sheep}}\text{goat}$$

If she will not trade a sheep for anything less than two goats, then her

$$MRS_{GS} = \frac{2\text{ goat}}\text{sheep} \neq \frac{1\text{ goat}}{2\text{ sheep}} = \frac1{\left(\frac{2\text{ sheep}}\text{goat}\right)} = \frac1{MRS_{SG}}$$

However, if she would trade one gram of banana for one ounce of ice cream and vice versa, then

$$MRS_{IB} = \frac{1\text{ oz ice cream}}{1\text{ g banana}} = \frac1{\left(\frac{1\text{ g banana}}{1\text{ oz ice cream}}\right)} = \frac1{MRS_{BI}}$$

When indifference curves (which are essentially graphs of instantaneous rates of substitution) and the convexity of those curves are not taken as given, the "law" of diminishing marginal utility is invoked to explain diminishing marginal rates of substitution – a willingness to accept fewer units of good or service $A$ in substitution for $B$ as one's holdings of $A$ grow relative to those of $B$. If an individual has a stock or flow of a good or service whose marginal utility is less than would be that of some other good or service for which he or she could trade, then it is in their interest to effect that trade. As one thing is traded-away and another is acquired, the respective marginal gains or losses from further trades are now changed. On the assumption that the marginal utility of one is diminishing, and the other is not increasing, all else being equal, an individual will demand an increasing ratio of that which is acquired to that which is sacrificed. One important way in which all else might not be equal is when the use of the one good or service complements that of the other. In such cases, exchange ratios might be constant. If any trader can better their own marginal position by offering an exchange more favorable to other traders with desired goods or services, then he or she will do so.

=== Marginal cost ===
At the highest level of generality, a marginal cost is a marginal opportunity cost. In most contexts, marginal cost refers to marginal pecuniary cost, that is to say marginal cost measured by forgone money.

A thorough-going marginalism sees marginal cost as increasing under the law of diminishing marginal utility, because applying resources to one application reduces their availability to other applications. Neoclassical economics tends to disregard this argument, but to see marginal costs as increasing in consequence of diminishing returns.

== Application to price theory ==
Marginalism and neoclassical economics typically explain price formation broadly through the interaction of curves or schedules of supply and demand. In any case buyers are modelled as pursuing typically lower quantities, and sellers offering typically higher quantities, as price is increased, with each being willing to trade until the marginal value of what they would trade-away exceeds that of the thing for which they would trade.

=== Demand ===
Demand curves are explained by marginalism in terms of marginal rates of substitution.

At any given price, a prospective buyer has some marginal rate of substitution of money for the good or service in question. Given the "law" of diminishing marginal utility, or otherwise given convex indifference curves, the rates are such that the willingness to forgo money for the good or service decreases as the buyer would have ever more of the good or service and ever less money. Hence, any given buyer has a demand schedule that generally decreases in response to price (at least until quantity demanded reaches zero). The aggregate quantity demanded by all buyers is, at any given price, just the sum of the quantities demanded by individual buyers, so it too decreases as price increases.

=== Supply ===
Both neoclassical economics and thorough-going marginalism could be said to explain supply curves in terms of marginal cost; however, there are marked differences in conceptions of that cost.

Marginalists in the tradition of Marshall and neoclassical economists tend to represent the supply curve for any producer as a curve of marginal pecuniary costs objectively determined by physical processes, with an upward slope determined by diminishing returns.

A more thorough-going marginalism represents the supply curve as a complementary demand curve – where the demand is for money and the purchase is made with a good or service. The shape of that curve is then determined by marginal rates of substitution of money for that good or service.

=== Markets ===
By confining themselves to limiting cases in which sellers or buyers are both "price takers" – so that demand functions ignore supply functions or vice versa – Marshallian marginalists and neoclassical economists produced tractable models of "pure" or "perfect" competition and of various forms of "imperfect" competition, which models are usually captured by relatively simple graphs. Other marginalists have sought to present what they thought of as more realistic explanations, but this work has been relatively uninfluential on the mainstream of economic thought.

=== Paradox of water and diamonds ===
The law of diminishing marginal utility is said to explain the paradox of water and diamonds, most commonly associated with Adam Smith, although it was recognized by earlier thinkers. Human beings cannot even survive without water, whereas diamonds, in Smith's day, were ornamentation or engraving bits. Yet water had a very small price, and diamonds a very large price. Marginalists explained that it is the marginal usefulness of any given quantity that matters, rather than the usefulness of a class or of a totality. For most people, water was sufficiently abundant that the loss or gain of a gallon would withdraw or add only some very minor use if any, whereas diamonds were in much more restricted supply, so that the loss or gain was much greater.

That is not to say that the price of any good or service is simply a function of the marginal utility that it has for any one individual nor for some ostensibly typical individual. Rather, individuals are willing to trade based upon the respective marginal utilities of the goods that they have or desire (with these marginal utilities being distinct for each potential trader), and prices thus develop constrained by these marginal utilities.

== History ==
=== Proto-marginalist approaches ===
Perhaps the essence of a notion of diminishing marginal utility can be found in Aristotle's Politics, wherein he writes

external goods have a limit, like any other instrument, and all things useful are of such a nature that where there is too much of them they must either do harm, or at any rate be of no use

There has been marked disagreement about the development and role of marginal considerations in Aristotle's' value theory.

A great variety of economists concluded that there was some sort of inter-relationship between utility and rarity that effected economic decisions, and in turn informed the determination of prices.

Eighteenth-century Italian mercantilists, such as Antonio Genovesi, Giammaria Ortes, Pietro Verri, Cesare Beccaria, and Giovanni Rinaldo, held that value was explained in terms of the general utility and of scarcity, though they did not typically work-out a theory of how these interacted. In Della Moneta (1751), Abbé Ferdinando Galiani, a pupil of Genovesi, attempted to explain value as a ratio of two ratios, utility and scarcity, with the latter component ratio being the ratio of quantity to use.

Anne Robert Jacques Turgot, in Réflexions sur la formation et la distribution de richesse (1769), held that value derived from the general utility of the class to which a good belonged, from comparison of present and future wants, and from anticipated difficulties in procurement.

Like the Italian mercantilists, Étienne Bonnot de Condillac saw value as determined by utility associated with the class to which the good belongs, and by estimated scarcity. In De commerce et le gouvernement (1776), Condillac emphasized that value is not based upon cost but that costs were paid because of value.

This last point was famously restated by the 19th-century proto-marginalist Richard Whately, who wrote as follows in Introductory Lectures on Political Economy (1832):

It is not that pearls fetch a high price because men have dived for them; but on the contrary, men dive for them because they fetch a high price.

Whately's student Nassau William Senior is noted below as an early marginalist.

Frédéric Bastiat in chapters V and XI of his Economic Harmonies (1850) also develops a theory of value as ratio between services that increment utility, rather than between total utility.

=== Marginalists before the Revolution ===
The first unambiguous published statement of any sort of theory of marginal utility was by Daniel Bernoulli, in "Specimen theoriae novae de mensura sortis". This paper appeared in 1738, but a draft had been written in 1731 or in 1732. In 1728, Gabriel Cramer produced fundamentally the same theory in a private letter. Each had sought to resolve the St. Petersburg paradox, and had concluded that the marginal desirability of money decreased as it was accumulated, more specifically such that the desirability of a sum were the natural logarithm (Bernoulli) or square root (Cramer) thereof. However, the more general implications of this hypothesis were not explicated, and the work fell into obscurity.

In "A Lecture on the Notion of Value as Distinguished Not Only from Utility, but also from Value in Exchange", delivered in 1833 and included in Lectures on Population, Value, Poor Laws and Rent (1837), William Forster Lloyd explicitly offered a general marginal utility theory, but did not offer its derivation nor elaborate its implications. The importance of his statement seems to have been lost on everyone (including Lloyd) until the early 20th century, by which time others had independently developed and popularized the same insight.

In An Outline of the Science of Political Economy (1836), Nassau William Senior asserted that marginal utilities were the ultimate determinant of demand, yet apparently did not pursue implications, though some interpret his work as indeed doing just that.

In "De la mesure de l'utilité des travaux publics" (1844), Jules Dupuit applied a conception of marginal utility to the problem of determining bridge tolls.

In 1854, Hermann Heinrich Gossen published Die Entwicklung der Gesetze des menschlichen Verkehrs und der daraus fließenden Regeln für menschliches Handeln, which presented a marginal utility theory and to a very large extent worked-out its implications for the behavior of a market economy. However, Gossen's work was not well received in the Germany of his time, most copies were destroyed unsold, and he was virtually forgotten until rediscovered after the so-called Marginal Revolution.

=== Marginal Revolution ===
Marginalism as a formal theory can be attributed to the work of three economists, Jevons in England, Menger in Austria, and Walras in Switzerland. William Stanley Jevons first proposed the theory in an article in 1862 and a book in 1871. Similarly, Carl Menger presented the theory in 1871. Menger explained why individuals use the importance of the last available unit (later termed marginal utility by Friedrich von Wieser) to decide amongst trade-offs, but while all his illustrative examples present value as quantified, whether value is measurable and cardinal or not for Menger is disputed, in this context it is worth noting that the formal concept of ordinal numbers was later introduced in 1883 by George Cantor and that among the main Austrian authors, only Friedrich August von Hayek interpreted Menger as an ordinalist, there is no evidence that Eugen Böhm-Bawerk or Ludwig von Mises shared that interpretation. Léon Walras introduced the theory in Éléments d'économie politique pure, the first part of which was published in 1874. The American John Bates Clark is also associated with the origins of Marginalism, but did little to advance the theory.

This new way of thinking was a very drastic shift in thinking from the classical school of economics, founded in part by Adam Smith, David Ricardo and Thomas Malthus. The classical school of economics believed in a concept called the labor theory of value which emphasized the idea that the amount of time it took to produce a good determined the value of that good. This concept's rival, marginal utility on the other hand, focused on the value that the consumer received from the good when determining its value. What the marginalists understood was that the exchange value of goods can be used to describe the use value of goods. Meghnad Desai puts it this way, "Individuals in their daily activity so managed their resources that they balanced the marginal utility--the utility (use value) derived from an extra unit of a commodity they consumed--with the price (exchange value) they paid for it". Thus, when consumption of a good goes up, the utility of that good decreases as it is consumed. Each person would continue to consume until the marginal utility would be equal to the price. Jevons also wanted to formulate a price theory that accounted for this marginal utility and discovered the following: cost production determines supply; supply determines final degree of utility; and final degree of utility determines value. Walras was able to articulate the utility maximization of the consumer far better than Jevons and Menger by assuming that utility was linked to the consumption of each good.

==== Second generation ====
Although the Marginal Revolution flowed from the work of Jevons, Menger, and Walras, their work might have failed to enter the mainstream were it not for a second generation of economists. In England, the second generation were exemplified by Philip Wicksteed, by William Smart, and by Alfred Marshall; in Austria by Eugen Böhm von Bawerk and by Friedrich von Wieser; in Switzerland by Vilfredo Pareto; and in America by Herbert Joseph Davenport and by Frank A. Fetter.

There were significant, distinguishing features amongst the approaches of Jevons, Menger, and Walras, but the second generation did not maintain distinctions along national or linguistic lines. The work of von Wieser was heavily influenced by that of Walras. Wicksteed was heavily influenced by Menger. Fetter referred to himself and Davenport as part of "the American Psychological School", named in imitation of the Austrian "Psychological School". Clark's work from this period onward similarly shows heavy influence by Menger. William Smart began as a conveyor of Austrian School theory to English-language readers, though he fell increasingly under the influence of Marshall.

Böhm-Bawerk was perhaps the most able expositor of Menger's conception. He was further noted for producing a theory of interest and of profit in equilibrium based upon the interaction of diminishing marginal utility with diminishing marginal productivity of time and with time preference. (This theory was adopted in full and then further developed by Knut Wicksell and with modifications including formal disregard for time-preference by Wicksell's American rival Irving Fisher.)

Marshall was the second-generation marginalist whose work on marginal utility came most to inform the mainstream of neoclassical economics, especially by way of his Principles of Economics, the first volume of which was published in 1890. Marshall constructed the demand curve with the aid of assumptions that utility was quantified, and that the marginal utility of money was constant, or nearly so. Like Jevons, Marshall did not see an explanation for supply in the theory of marginal utility, so he paired a marginal explanation of demand with a more classical explanation of supply, wherein costs were taken to be objectively determined. Marshall later actively mischaracterized the criticism that these costs were themselves ultimately determined by marginal utilities.

W. E. B. Du Bois authored an unpublished 158-page 1891 manuscript, A Constructive Critique of Wage Theory, where he developed a marginalist wage theory.

==== Marginal Revolution as a response to socialism ====
The doctrines of marginalism and the Marginal Revolution are often interpreted as a response to the rise of the worker's movement, Marxian economics and the earlier (Ricardian) socialist theories of the exploitation of labour. The first volume of Das Kapital was not published until July 1867, when marginalism was already developing, but before the advent of Marxian economics, proto-marginalist ideas such as those of Gossen had largely fallen on deaf ears. It was only in the 1880s, when Marxism had come to the fore as the main economic theory of the workers' movement, that Gossen found (posthumous) recognition.

Aside from the rise of Marxism, E. Screpanti and S. Zamagni point to a different 'external' reason for marginalism's success, which is its successful response to the Long Depression and the resurgence of class conflict in all developed capitalist economies after the 1848–1870 period of social peace. Marginalism, Screpanti and Zamagni argue, offered a theory of the free market as perfect, as performing optimal allocation of resources, while it allowed economists to blame any adverse effects of laissez-faire economics on the interference of workers' coalitions in the proper functioning of the market.

Scholars have suggested that the success of the generation who followed the preceptors of the Revolution was their ability to formulate straightforward responses to Marxist economic theory. The most famous of these was that of Böhm-Bawerk, "Zum Abschluss des Marxschen Systems" (1896), but the first was Wicksteed's "The Marxian Theory of Value. Das Kapital: A Criticism" (1884, followed by "The Jevonian Criticism of Marx: A Rejoinder" in 1885). The most famous early Marxist responses were Rudolf Hilferding's Böhm-Bawerks Marx-Kritik (1904) and The Economic Theory of the Leisure Class (1914) by Nikolai Bukharin.

=== Eclipse ===
In his 1881 work Mathematical Psychics, Francis Ysidro Edgeworth presented the indifference curve, deriving its properties from marginalist theory which assumed utility to be a differentiable function of quantified goods and services. But it came to be seen that indifference curves could be considered as somehow given, without bothering with notions of utility.

In 1915, Eugen Slutsky derived a theory of consumer choice solely from properties of indifference curves. Because of the World War, the Bolshevik Revolution, and his own subsequent loss of interest, Slutsky's work drew almost no notice, but similar work in 1934 by John Hicks and R. G. D. Allen derived much the same results and found a significant audience. Allen subsequently drew attention to Slutsky's earlier accomplishment.

Although some of the third generation of Austrian School economists had by 1911 rejected the quantification of utility while continuing to think in terms of marginal utility, most economists presumed that utility must be a sort of quantity. Indifference curve analysis seemed to represent a way of dispensing with presumptions of quantification, albeit that a seemingly arbitrary assumption (admitted by Hicks to be a "rabbit out of a hat") about decreasing marginal rates of substitution would then have to be introduced to have convexity of indifference curves.

For those who accepted that marginal utility analysis had been superseded by indifference curve analysis, the former became at best somewhat analogous to the Bohr model of the atom—perhaps pedagogically useful, but "old fashioned" and ultimately incorrect.

=== Revival ===
When Cramer and Bernoulli introduced the notion of diminishing marginal utility, it had been to address a paradox of gambling, rather than the paradox of value. The marginalists of the revolution, however, had been formally concerned with problems in which there was neither risk nor uncertainty. So too with the indifference curve analysis of Slutsky, Hicks, and Allen.

The expected utility hypothesis of Bernoulli et alii was revived by various 20th century thinkers, including Frank Ramsey (1926), John von Neumann and Oskar Morgenstern (1944), and Leonard Savage (1954). Although this hypothesis remains controversial, it brings not merely utility but a quantified conception thereof back into the mainstream of economic thought, and would dispatch the Ockhamistic argument. It should perhaps be noted that in expected utility analysis the law of diminishing marginal utility corresponds to what is called risk aversion.

== Criticism ==
=== Marxist criticism of marginalism ===
Karl Marx died before marginalism became the interpretation of economic value accepted by mainstream economics. His theory was based on the labor theory of value, which distinguishes between exchange value and use value. In his Capital, he rejected the explanation of long-term market values by supply and demand:

Nothing is easier than to realize the inconsistencies of demand and supply, and the resulting deviation of market-prices from market-values. The real difficulty consists in determining what is meant by the equation of supply and demand.
[...]
If supply equals demand, they cease to act, and for this very reason commodities are sold at their market-values. Whenever two forces operate equally in opposite directions, they balance one another, exert no outside influence, and any phenomena taking place in these circumstances must be explained by causes other than the effect of these two forces. If supply and demand balance one another, they cease to explain anything, do not affect market-values, and therefore leave us so much more in the dark about the reasons why the market-value is expressed in just this sum of money and no other.

In his early response to marginalism, Nikolai Bukharin argued that "the subjective evaluation from which price is to be derived really starts from this price", concluding:

Whenever the Böhm-Bawerk theory, it appears, resorts to individual motives as a basis for the derivation of social phenomena, he is actually smuggling in the social content in a more or less disguised form in advance, so that the entire construction becomes a vicious circle, a continuous logical fallacy, a fallacy that can serve only specious ends, and demonstrating in reality nothing more than the complete barrenness of modern bourgeois theory.

Similarly a later Marxist critic, Ernest Mandel, argued that marginalism was "divorced from reality", ignored the role of production, further arguing:

It is, moreover, unable to explain how, from the clash of millions of different individual "needs" there emerge not only uniform prices, but prices which remain stable over long periods, even under perfect conditions of free competition. Rather than an explanation of constants, and of the basic evolution of economic life, the "marginal" technique provides at best an explanation of ephemeral, short-term variations.

Maurice Dobb argued that prices derived through marginalism depend on the distribution of income. The ability of consumers to express their preferences is dependent on their spending power. As the theory asserts that prices arise in the act of exchange, Dobb argues that it cannot explain how the distribution of income affects prices and consequently cannot explain prices.

Dobb also criticized the motives behind marginal utility theory. Jevons wrote, for example, "so far as is consistent with the inequality of wealth in every community, all commodities are distributed by exchange so as to produce the maximum social benefit." (See Fundamental theorems of welfare economics.) Dobb contended that this statement indicated that marginalism is intended to insulate market economics from criticism by making prices the natural result of the given income distribution.

=== Marxist adaptations to marginalism ===
Some economists strongly influenced by the Marxian tradition such as Oskar Lange, Włodzimierz Brus, and Michał Kalecki have attempted to integrate it with the insights of classical political economy, marginalism, and neoclassical economics. They believed that Marx lacked a sophisticated theory of prices, and neoclassical economics lacked a theory of the social frameworks of economic activity. Some other Marxists have also argued that on one level there is no conflict between marginalism and Marxism as one could employ a marginalist theory of supply and demand within the context of a big picture understanding of the Marxist notion that capitalists exploit surplus labor.

== See also ==
- Theory of value
