= Imputed rent =

Concept in economic theory

Imputed rent is the estimated rental price that an individual would pay for an asset they own. This concept applies broadly to capital goods but is most frequently used in housing markets to measure the rent homeowners would pay for a housing unit equivalent to their own. Imputing housing rent is essential for accurately measuring economic activity in national accounts, as asset owners do not actually pay rent, requiring indirect estimation methods.

Imputed housing rent applies the theory of imputation to real estate, where value is determined by what buyers are willing to pay rather than the seller's costs. Market rents serve as a proxy to estimate the value to the property owner, enabling comparisons between the economic decisions of homeowners and tenants.

Formally, in owner-occupancy, the typical landlord–tenant relationship is bypassed. For example, consider two property owners, A and B. If A lives in B's property and B lives in A's, rent payments occur between them. However, if both are owner-occupiers, no monetary exchange takes place, despite the same underlying economic relationships. The hypothetical rent that would have been paid in a landlord-tenant arrangement is the imputed rent. This concept can also be viewed as returns on asset investments and may be included in disposable income calculations, such as for income distribution indices.

== Measurement ==
Two primary methods are used to estimate imputed rents for housing: the "comparison approach" and the "user cost of capital" approach.

=== Comparison approach ===
The comparison approach matches rents of tenant-occupied housing units with similar owner-occupied units. If the units are comparable, the owner-occupant's imputed rent equals the avoided rental cost of the tenant-occupied unit.

In the United States, the Bureau of Labor Statistics employs this method to estimate price changes for owner-occupied housing in the Consumer Price Index (CPI).

=== User cost of capital approach ===
The user cost approach calculates unrecoverable ownership costs, defined as:

$R = (i + r_p + m + d)P_H$

Where:

- i = interest rate
- r_{p} = property tax rate
- m = maintenance cost
- d = depreciation

The imputed rent is the sum of these rates multiplied by the house price, P_{H}. More advanced models account for differential interest costs (e.g., housing debt vs. equity) and tax treatment of housing income.

== Effects of owner-occupancy ==
- Imputed rents are excluded from measures of national income and output unless explicitly added. In the USA, living in a house you own is not regarded as a taxable transaction.
- Governments miss potential tax revenue from these hypothetical transactions. Some countries, like Belgium, The Netherlands, Iceland, and Switzerland, tax imputed rent, though such policies are often unpopular. The absence of such taxes is termed Home-Ownership Bias. US tax policy promotes home ownership by not having imputed rent taxation to those living in homes they own.

In datasets like the Cross-National Equivalent File, imputed rent is estimated as follows:

- For owner-occupiers: 4–6% of the property's capital value.
- For public housing tenants: the difference between paid rent and market rent for a comparable property.
- For rent-free occupants: estimated market rent for a similar property.
- For private renters: zero (actual rent payments are already recorded).

== Extending the principle ==
While imputed rent is primarily applied to housing, the concept could theoretically extend to other rentable goods (e.g., vehicles, furniture). However, the economic impact is negligible compared to housing: "In principle, the BEA should include imputed rent for items like cars and furniture, but the effort outweighs the benefit due to their small share of the economy."

== See also ==
- Imputed income
- Land value tax
- Property tax
