= Theory of imputation =

Theory in economics

The theory of imputation is based on the so-called theory of factors of production proposed by the French economist Jean-Baptiste Say and elaborated by the American economist John Bates Clark in his work The Distribution of Wealth (1899; Russian translation, 1934). The proponents of the theory of imputation see its main task as elucidating which parts of wealth may be attributed (imputed) to labor and capital, respectively.

== Principles ==
In economics, the theory of imputation, first expounded by Carl Menger, maintains that factor prices are determined by output prices (i.e. the value of factors of production is the individual contribution of each in the final product, but its value is the value of the last contributed to the final product (the marginal utility before reaching the point Pareto optimal). Thus, Friedrich von Wieser identified a flaw in the theory of imputation as expounded by his teacher, Carl Menger: overvaluation may occur if one is confronted with economies where profits jump (maximums and minimums in his utility function, where its first derivative equals 0). Wieser thus suggested as an alternative, the simultaneous solution of a system of industrial equations:

- Industry 1: X + Y = 300
- Industry 2: 6X + Z = 900
- Industry 3: 4Y + 3Z = 1700 ⇒ X = 100, Y = 200, Z = 300.

Given that a factor is used in the production of a range of first-order goods, its value is determined by the good that is worth the least among all the goods in the range. This value is determined at the margin, the marginal utility of the last unit of the least valuable good produced by the factor. In connection with his opportunity cost, the value so derived represents an opportunity cost across all industries, and the values of the factors of production and goods are determined in the whole system. Thus, supply and demand do not develop into the determinants of value; the determinant of value is the marginal utility.

That is the opposite of the labor theory of value, maintained by classical economists such as Adam Smith and David Ricardo.

== See also ==
- Implicit cost
- Imputed income
- Imputed rent
