= Austrian school of economics =

School of economic thought

The Austrian school of economics (Note: Also referred to as Austrian economics.) is a heterodox school of economic thought that advocates strict adherence to methodological individualism, which is the theory that social phenomena result primarily from the actions of individuals, each motivated by their own self-interest. Austrian-school theorists hold that economic theory should be exclusively derived from basic axioms of human action, known as praxeology, rather than primarily from statistical analysis.

The Austrian school originated in 1871 in Vienna with the work of Carl Menger, Eugen von Böhm-Bawerk, Friedrich von Wieser, and others. It was methodologically opposed to the Historical school, in a dispute known as Methodenstreit, or methodology quarrel. Current-day economists working in this tradition are located in many countries, but their work is still referred to as Austrian economics. Among the theoretical contributions of the early years of the Austrian school are the subjective theory of value, marginalism in price theory, and the formulation of the economic calculation problem.

In the 1970s, the Austrian school attracted some renewed interest after Friedrich August von Hayek shared the 1974 Nobel Memorial Prize in Economic Sciences with Gunnar Myrdal.

== History ==
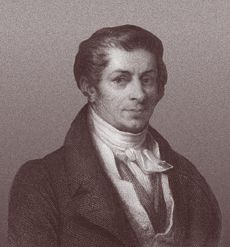
Jean-Baptiste Say. The French liberal school of political economy is an intellectual ancestor of the Austrian school of economics.

=== Etymology ===
The Austrian school owes its name to members of the German historical school of economics, who argued against the Austrians during the late 19th-century Methodenstreit ("methodology struggle"). In this debate, the Austrians defended the role of theory in economics as distinct from the study or compilation of historical circumstance. In 1883, Menger published Investigations into the Method of the Social Sciences with Special Reference to Economics, which attacked the methods of the historical school. Gustav von Schmoller, a leader of the historical school, responded with an unfavorable review, coining the term "Austrian school" in an attempt to characterize the school as outcast and provincial. The label endured and was adopted by the adherents themselves.

=== Precursors ===
The School of Salamanca (16th-century Spain) and the French Liberal School (19th-century France) are often regarded as early precursors to the Austrian School of Economics due to their contributions to the subjective theory of value and advocacy for free-market principles. Scholars from the University of Salamanca, such as Francisco de Vitoria and Luis de Molina, argued that the value of goods was determined by individual preferences rather than intrinsic factors. They also emphasized the role of supply and demand in setting prices and importance of sound money, laying the groundwork for modern economic concepts that the Austrian School would later refine and expand upon.

=== First wave ===
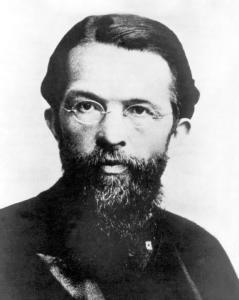
Carl Menger

The school originated in Vienna in Austria-Hungary. Carl Menger's 1871 book Principles of Economics is generally considered the founding of the Austrian school. The book was one of the first modern treatises to advance the theory of marginal utility. The Austrian school was one of three founding currents of the marginalist revolution of the 1870s, with its major contribution being the introduction of the subjectivist approach in economics.

John Stuart Mill had earlier expressed a similar idea in his 1848 Principles of Political Economy, observing that the usefulness of a good to the buyer effectively sets the highest price anyone would rationally pay for it. Market price can fall below this level of usefulness, but it cannot rise above it; otherwise buyers would be paying more than they themselves judge the good to be worth as a means of satisfying their wants.

While marginalism was generally influential, there was also a more specific school that began to coalesce around Menger's work, which came to be known as the "psychological school", "Vienna school", or "Austrian school". Menger's contributions to economic theory were closely followed by those of Eugen von Böhm-Bawerk and Friedrich von Wieser. These three economists became what is known as the "first wave" of the Austrian school. Böhm-Bawerk wrote extensive critiques of Karl Marx in the 1880s and 1890s and was part of the Austrians' participation in the late 19th-century Methodenstreit, during which they attacked the Hegelian doctrines of the historical school.

=== Early 20th century ===
Frank Albert Fetter (1863–1949) was a leader in the United States of Austrian thought. He obtained his PhD in 1894 from the University of Halle and became Professor of Political Economy and Finance at Cornell University in 1901.

Several important Austrian economists trained at the University of Vienna in the 1920s and later participated in private seminars held by Ludwig von Mises. These included Gottfried Haberler, Friedrich Hayek, Fritz Machlup, Karl Menger (son of Carl Menger), Oskar Morgenstern, Paul Rosenstein-Rodan, Abraham Wald, and Michael A. Heilperin, and the sociologist Alfred Schütz.

=== Later 20th century ===
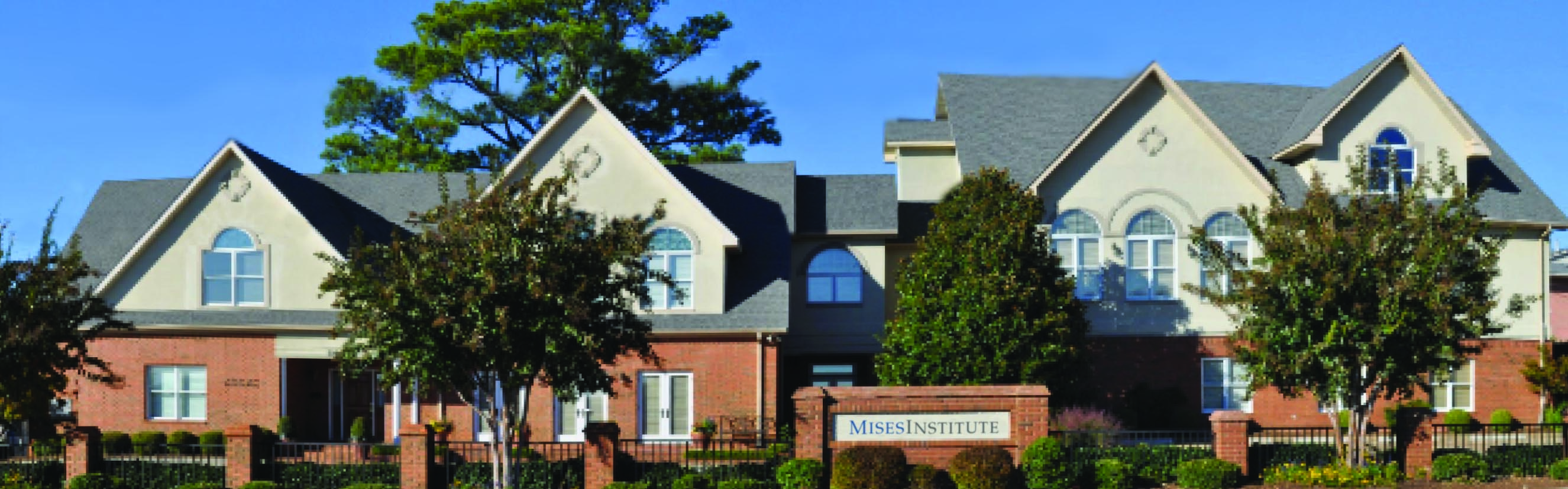
Campus of Mises Institute, in Auburn, Alabama, United States

By the mid-1930s, most economists had embraced what they considered the important contributions of the early Austrians. Fritz Machlup quoted Hayek's statement that "the greatest success of a school is that it stops existing because its fundamental teachings have become parts of the general body of commonly accepted thought".

Sometime during the middle of the 20th century, Austrian economics was largely sidelined by mainstream economists who favored mathematical modeling and statistical methods. Mises' student Israel Kirzner recalled that in 1954, when Kirzner was pursuing his PhD, there was no separate Austrian school as such. When Kirzner was deciding which graduate school to attend, Mises had advised him to accept an offer of admission at Johns Hopkins because it was a prestigious university and Fritz Machlup taught there.

After the 1940s, Austrian economics can be divided into two schools of economic thought and the school split to some degree in the late 20th century. One camp of Austrians, exemplified by Mises, regards neoclassical methodology to be irredeemably flawed; the other camp, exemplified by Friedrich Hayek, accepts a large part of neoclassical methodology and is more accepting of government intervention in the economy. Henry Hazlitt wrote economics columns and editorials for a number of publications and wrote many books on the topic of Austrian economics from the 1930s to the 1980s. Hazlitt's thinking was influenced by Mises. His book Economics in One Lesson (1946) sold over a million copies and he is also known for The Failure of the "New Economics" (1959), a line-by-line critique of John Maynard Keynes's General Theory.

The reputation of the Austrian school rose in the late 20th century due in part to the work of Israel Kirzner and Ludwig Lachmann at New York University and to renewed public awareness of the work of Hayek after he won the 1974 Nobel Memorial Prize in Economic Sciences. Hayek's work was influential in the revival of laissez-faire thought in the 20th century.

=== Split among contemporary Austrians ===
Economist Leland Yeager discussed the late 20th-century rift and referred to a discussion written by Murray Rothbard, Hans-Hermann Hoppe, Joseph Salerno and others in which they criticized Hayek. Yeager stated: "To try to drive a wedge between Mises and Hayek on [the role of knowledge in economic calculation], especially to the disparagement of Hayek, is unfair to these two great men, unfaithful to the history of economic thought". He went on to call the rift subversive to economic analysis and the historical understanding of the fall of Eastern European communism.

In a 1999 book published by the Ludwig von Mises Institute, Hoppe asserted that Rothbard was the leader of the "mainstream within Austrian Economics" and contrasted Rothbard with Nobel Laureate Friedrich Hayek, whom he identified as a British empiricist and an opponent of the thought of Mises and Rothbard. Hoppe acknowledged that Hayek was the most prominent Austrian economist within academia, but stated that Hayek was an opponent of the Austrian tradition which led from Carl Menger and Böhm-Bawerk through Mises to Rothbard. Austrian economist Walter Block says that the Austrian school can be distinguished from other schools of economic thought through two categories—economic theory and political theory. According to Block, while Hayek can be considered an Austrian economist, his views on political theory clash with the libertarian political theory which Block sees as an integral part of the Austrian school.

Both criticism from Hoppe and Block to Hayek apply to Carl Menger, the founder of the Austrian school. Hoppe emphasizes that Hayek, which for him is from the English empirical tradition, is an opponent of the supposed rationalist tradition of the Austrian school; Menger made strong critiques to rationalism in his works in similar vein as Hayek's. Menger emphasized the idea that there are several institutions which were not deliberately created, have a kind of "superior wisdom" and serve important functions to society. He also talked about Edmund Burke and the English tradition to sustain these positions.

When saying that the libertarian political theory is an integral part of the Austrian school and supposing Hayek is not a libertarian, Block excludes Menger from the Austrian school, too, since Menger seems to defend broader state activity than Hayek—for example, progressive taxation and extensive labour legislation.

Economists of the Hayekian view are affiliated with the Cato Institute, George Mason University (GMU) and New York University, among other institutions. They include Roger Garrison and George Reisman. Economists of the Mises–Rothbard view include Walter Block, Hans-Hermann Hoppe, Jesús Huerta de Soto and Robert P. Murphy, each of whom is associated with the Mises Institute and some of them also with academic institutions.

=== Influence ===
Many theories developed by "first wave" Austrian economists have long been absorbed into mainstream economics. These include Carl Menger's theories on marginal utility, Friedrich von Wieser's theories on opportunity cost and Eugen von Böhm-Bawerk's theories on time preference, as well as Menger and Böhm-Bawerk's criticisms of Marxian economics.

Former American Federal Reserve Chairman Alan Greenspan said that the founders of the Austrian school "reached far into the future from when most of them practiced and have had a profound and, in my judgment, probably an irreversible effect on how most mainstream economists think in this country". In 1987, Nobel Laureate James M. Buchanan told an interviewer: "I have no objections to being called an Austrian. Hayek and Mises might consider me an Austrian but, surely some of the others would not".

As economics has become increasingly quantitative with the rise of statistics and econometrics, the Austrian school is now generally considered heterodox due to its rejection of such mathematical methods, rather focusing more on decentralised knowledge.

Currently, universities with a significant Austrian presence are George Mason University, King Juan Carlos University, and Universidad Francisco Marroquín. Austrian economic ideas are also promoted by privately funded organizations such as the Mises Institute, the Cato Institute or the Instituto Juan de Mariana.

== Theory ==
The Austrian school theorizes that the subjective choices of individuals including individual knowledge, time, expectation and other subjective factors cause all economic phenomena. Austrians seek to understand the economy by examining the social ramifications of individual choice, an approach called methodological individualism. It differs from other schools of economic thought, which have focused on aggregate variables, equilibrium analysis, and societal groups rather than individuals.

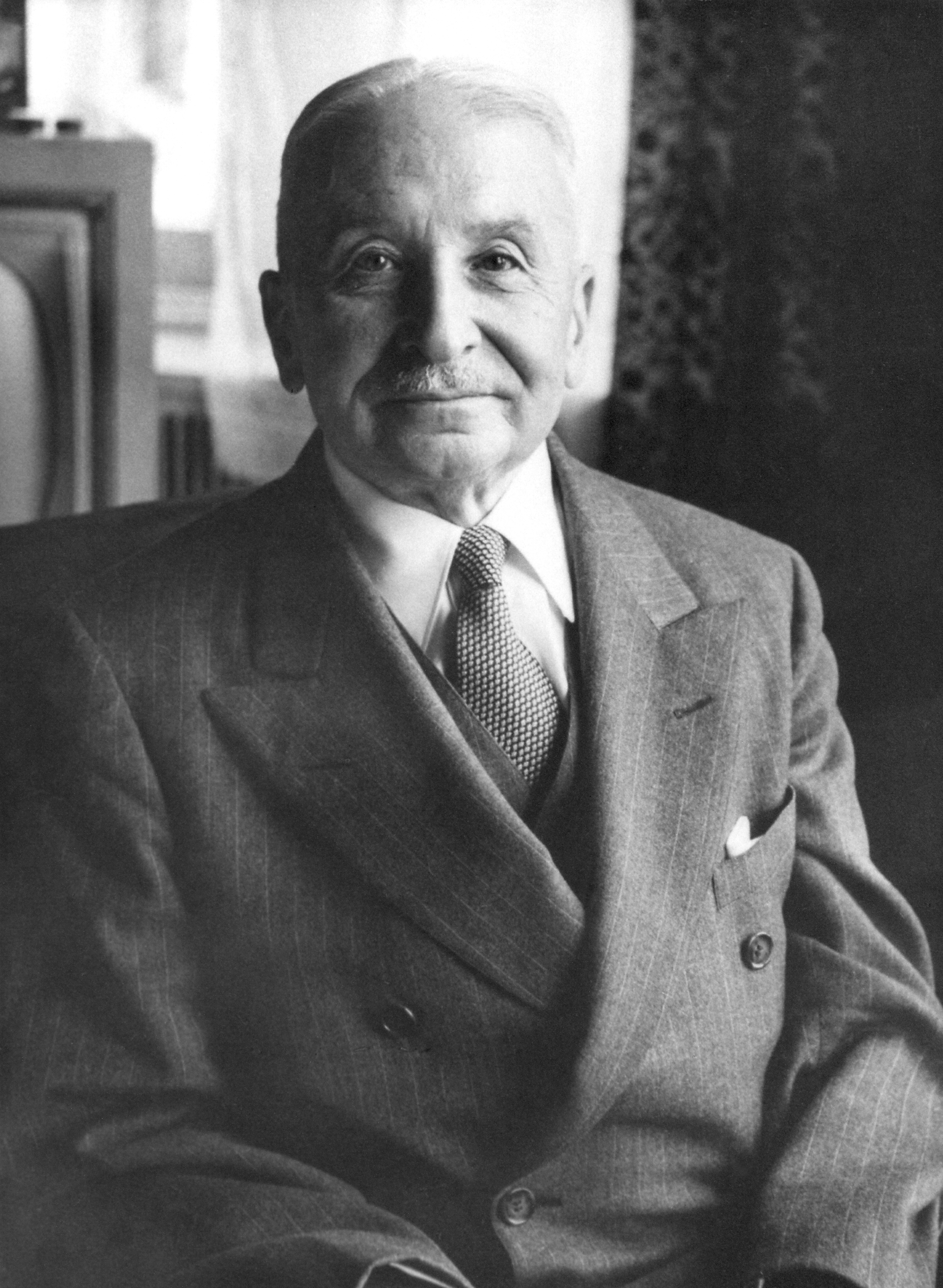
Ludwig von Mises

In the 20th and 21st centuries, economists with a methodological lineage to the early Austrian school developed many diverse approaches and theoretical orientations. Ludwig von Mises organized his version of the subjectivist approach, which he called "praxeology", in a book published in English as Human Action in 1949. In it, Mises stated that praxeology could be used to deduce a priori theoretical economic truths and that deductive economic thought experiments could yield conclusions which follow irrefutably from the underlying assumptions. He wrote that conclusions could not be inferred from empirical observation or statistical analysis and argued against the use of probabilities in economic models.

Since Mises' time, some Austrian thinkers have accepted his praxeological approach while others have adopted alternative methodologies. For example, Fritz Machlup, Friedrich Hayek and others did not take Mises' strong a priori approach to economics. Ludwig Lachmann, a radical subjectivist, also largely rejected Mises' formulation of praxeology in favor of the verstehende Methode ("interpretive method") articulated by Max Weber.

In the 20th century, various Austrians incorporated models and mathematics into their analysis. Austrian economist Steven Horwitz argued in 2000 that Austrian methodology is consistent with macroeconomics and that Austrian macroeconomics can be expressed in terms of microeconomic foundations. Austrian economist Roger Garrison writes that Austrian macroeconomic theory can be correctly expressed in terms of diagrammatic models. In 1944, Austrian economist Oskar Morgenstern presented a rigorous schematization of an ordinal utility function (the Von Neumann–Morgenstern utility theorem) in Theory of Games and Economic Behavior.

=== Fundamental tenets ===
In 1981, Fritz Machlup summarized what he regarded as the typical views of Austrian economic thinking:

- Methodological individualism: Economic phenomena must be explained by tracing them back to the actions (or inaction) of individuals; groups or collectives act only through their individual members. Groups do not think; people think.
- Methodological subjectivism: Judgments and choices are made by individuals on the basis of their own knowledge, beliefs, and expectations regarding external developments and the consequences of their actions.
- Tastes and preferences: Subjective valuations of goods and services determine the demand for them so that their prices are influenced by consumers.
- Opportunity costs: The costs of the alternative opportunities that must be foregone; as productive services are employed for one purpose, all alternative uses have to be sacrificed.
- Marginalism: In all economic designs, the values, costs, revenues, productivity and so on are determined by the significance of the last unit added to or subtracted from the total.
- Time structure of production and consumption: Decisions to save reflect "time preferences" regarding consumption in the immediate, distant, or indefinite future and investments are made in view of larger outputs expected to be obtained if more time-taking production processes are undertaken.

Machlup also identified two additional tenets particularly associated with the Mises branch of Austrian economics:

- Consumer sovereignty: The influence consumers have on the effective demand for goods and services and through the prices which result in free competitive markets, on the production plans of producers and investors, is not merely a hard fact but also an important objective, attainable only by complete avoidance of governmental interference with the markets and of restrictions on the freedom of sellers and buyers to follow their own judgment regarding quantities, qualities and prices of products and services.
- Political individualism: Only when individuals are given full economic freedom will it be possible to secure political and moral freedom. Restrictions on economic freedom lead, sooner or later, to an extension of the coercive activities of the state into the political domain, undermining and eventually destroying the essential individual liberties which the capitalistic societies were able to attain in the 19th century.

== Contributions to economic thought ==
=== Opportunity cost ===
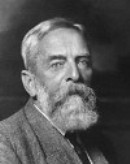
Friedrich von Wieser

The opportunity cost doctrine was first explicitly formulated by the Austrian economist Friedrich von Wieser in the late 19th century. Opportunity cost is the cost of any activity measured in terms of the value of the next best alternative foregone (that is not chosen). It is the sacrifice related to the second best choice available to someone, or group, who has picked among several mutually exclusive choices.

Expectations of the future must also be considered as a form of scarcity; when quantified as time preference, opportunity cost must also be valued with respect to one's preference for present versus future investments. Opportunity cost is a key concept in mainstream economics and has been described as expressing "the basic relationship between scarcity and choice". The notion of opportunity cost plays a crucial part in ensuring that resources are used efficiently.

=== Capital and interest ===
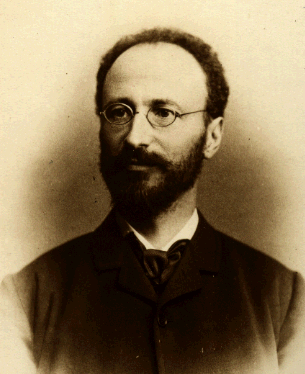
Eugen von Böhm-Bawerk

The Austrian theory of capital and interest was first developed by Eugen von Böhm-Bawerk. He stated that interest rates and profits are determined by supply and demand in the market for final goods and by time preference.

Böhm-Bawerk's theory equates capital intensity with the degree of roundaboutness of production processes. He also argued that the law of marginal utility necessarily implies the classical law of costs. However, later Austrian economists such as Ludwig von Mises, Israel Kirzner, Ludwig Lachmann, and Jesús Huerta de Soto rejected a productivity explanation for interest rates, viewing the average period of production as a remnant of classical economic thought.

=== Inflation ===
In Mises's definition, inflation is an increase in the supply of money:

In theoretical investigation there is only one meaning that can rationally be attached to the expression Inflation: an increase in the quantity of money (in the broader sense of the term, so as to include fiduciary media as well), that is not offset by a corresponding increase in the need for money (again in the broader sense of the term), so that a fall in the objective exchange-value of money must occur.

Hayek claimed that inflationary stimulation exploits the lag between an increase in money supply and the consequent increase in the prices of goods and services:

And since any inflation, however modest at first, can help employment only so long as it accelerates, adopted as a means of reducing unemployment, it will do so for any length of time only while it accelerates. "Mild" steady inflation cannot help—it can lead only to outright inflation. That inflation at a constant rate soon ceases to have any stimulating effect, and in the end merely leaves us with a backlog of delayed adaptations, is the conclusive argument against the "mild" inflation represented as beneficial even in standard economics textbooks.

Even prominent Austrian economists have noted the terminological confusion: Austrians define inflation as an increase in the money supply, while most economists and the public define it as rising prices.

=== Economic calculation problem ===
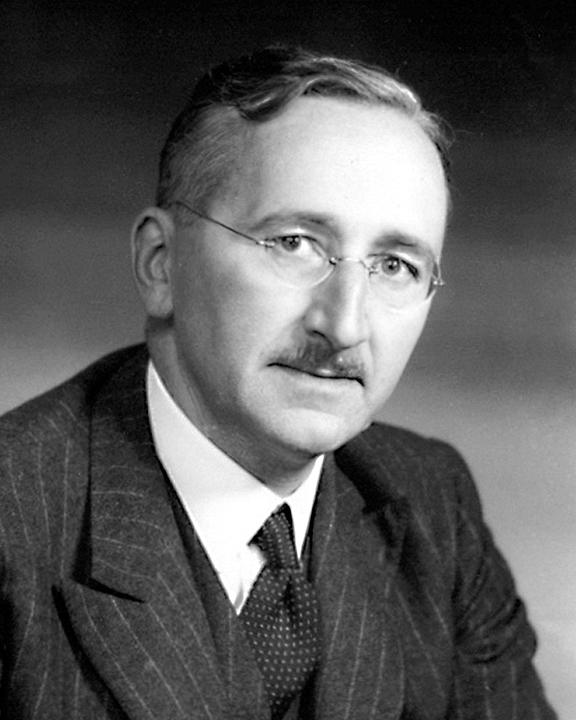
Friedrich Hayek

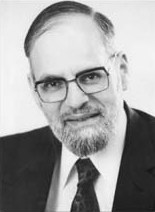
Israel Kirzner

The economic calculation problem refers to a criticism of planned economies first developed by Ludwig von Mises with his 1920 essay "economic calculation in the socialist commonwealth". Mises subsequently discussed his idea with his student Friedrich Hayek, who expanded it in various works including The Road to Serfdom. The calculation problem essentially states that without price signals, the factors of production cannot be allocated in the most efficient way possible, rendering planned economies inefficacious.

Max Weber reached a similar conclusion in his magnum opus "Wirtschaft und Gesellschaft" (posthumously published in 1921), discussing the impossibility of centralized planning of a complex economic system.

Austrian theory emphasizes the organizing power of markets. Hayek stated that market prices reflect information, the totality of which is not known to any single individual, which determines the allocation of resources in an economy. Because socialist systems lack the individual incentives and price discovery processes by which individuals act on their personal information, Hayek argued that socialist economic planners lack all of the knowledge required to make optimal decisions. Those who agree with this criticism view it as a refutation of socialism, showing that socialism is not a viable or sustainable form of economic organization. The debate rose to prominence in the 1920s and 1930s and that specific period of the debate has come to be known by historians of economic thought as the socialist calculation debate.

Mises argued that the pricing systems in socialist economies were necessarily deficient because if the government owned the means of production, then no prices could be obtained for capital goods as they were merely internal transfers of goods in a socialist system and not "objects of exchange", unlike final goods. Therefore, they were unpriced and hence the system would be necessarily inefficient since the central planners would not know how to allocate the available resources efficiently. This led him to write "that rational economic activity is impossible in a socialist commonwealth".

=== Business cycles ===
The Austrian theory of the business cycle (ABCT) focuses on banks' issuance of credit as the cause of economic fluctuations. Although later elaborated by Hayek and others, the theory was first set forth by Mises, who posited that fractional reserve banks extend credit at artificially low interest rates, causing businesses to invest in relatively roundabout production processes. This artificial "boom" then led to a misallocation of resources which he called "malinvestment" that must eventually end in a "bust".

Mises surmised that government manipulation of money and credit in the banking system throws savings and investment out of balance, resulting in misdirected investment projects that are eventually found to be unsustainable, at which point the economy has to rebalance itself through a period of corrective recession. Austrian economist Fritz Machlup summarized the Austrian view by stating, "monetary factors cause the cycle but real phenomena constitute it."

Critics have noted that successful entrepreneurs will adjust their investment decisions based on projected long-term interest rates. For Austrians, the only prudent strategy for government is to leave money and the financial system to the free market's competitive forces to eradicate the business cycle's inflationary booms and recessionary busts, allowing markets to keep people's saving and investment decisions in place for well-coordinated economic stability and growth.

A Keynesian would suggest government intervention during a recession to inject spending into the economy when people will not. However, the heart of Austrian macroeconomic theory argues the government "fine tuning" through expansions and contractions in the money supply orchestrated by the government are actually the cause of business cycles because of the differing impact of the resulting interest rate changes on different stages in the structure of production. Austrian economist Thomas Woods further supports this view by arguing it is not consumption, but rather production that should be emphasized. A country cannot become rich by consuming, and therefore, by using up all their resources. Instead, production is what enables consumption as a possibility in the first place, since a producer would be working for nothing, if not for the desire to consume.

==== Central banks ====
According to Ludwig von Mises, central banks enable commercial banks to fund loans at artificially low interest rates, thereby inducing an unsustainable expansion of bank credit and impeding any subsequent contraction. He argued for a gold standard as a monetary reform to constrain growth in fiduciary media. Friedrich Hayek took a different perspective, not focusing on gold but on regulation of the banking sector via strong central banking.

Some economists argue money is endogenous and that this refutes the Austrian Business Cycle Theory. Others maintain that the underlying issue of credit expansion would remain the same under any system of fractional-reserve banking, whether central or private.

=== Bitcoin and cryptocurrencies ===
Some economists assert that Bitcoin's theoretical foundations can be traced back to the Austrian school through its embrace of core principles such as decentralization, individual sovereignty, sound money, and resistance to fiat money. In the 21st century, some political scientists have argued that Friedrich Hayek would have supported Bitcoin and cryptocurrencies due to their resistance to political pressure and alignment with his emphasis on sound money and competition in currencies. They have also described cryptocurrency as a potential "Hayekian escape" from government currency monopolies, particularly during periods of hyperinflation.

In some ways, Bitcoin is at odds with certain Austrian principles, such as Mises' regression theorem, which holds that money must originate from a commodity with prior use value. Bitcoin demonstrates that digital scarcity and market trust alone are sufficient to create a functioning medium of exchange.

Many proponents of Bitcoin and cryptocurrency have been inspired by Austrian economics. For example, Saifedean Ammous and Nick Szabo both use Austrian principles to explain why the Rai stones of Yap failed as sound money while Bitcoin succeeds. The Rai stones embodied many properties, such as durability, general acceptance, and "the high cost of acquiring new stones," which made them difficult to debase. However, when colonists visited the island in the 1870s, they were able to bring in new Rai stones with far less effort, inflating the supply and devaluing the currency. Ammous and Szabo argue that Bitcoin's 21 million cap prevents similar debasement. Ammous also criticizes Keynesian economics for discounting long-term consequences in favor of perceived short-term gain. Erik Voorhees was also inspired to become involved in cryptocurrency, in part through Austrian economics, and had Ron Paul sign his copy of Murray Rothbard's “Man, Economy and State.”

== See also ==
- Carl Menger
- Chicago school of economics
- Criticism of the Federal Reserve
- Hard money (policy)
- Kraków School of Economics
- List of Austrian intellectual traditions
- List of Austrian-school economists
- New institutional economics
- Perspectives on capitalism by school of thought
- Peter St. Onge
