= Rational economic exchange =

Economic transaction that advances the economic interests of both parties

Rational economic exchange also called goods exchange economy is an economic transaction where goods or services are transferred from the provider for a return of relative value (compensation) from the receiver in a manner that advances the economic interests of both parties. Rational economic exchange is implied in voluntary economic transactions between private parties (i.e., regular commerce) where it is assumed that an economic transaction would not occur unless both parties believed they would be better off after the trade. Rational economic exchange can be implied in governmental taxation and spending where the agents of the citizen—government legislators and administrators—implement fiscal policy where tax assessment to the citizen is related, substantially, to an implied level of government service.

== See also ==
- Implied level of government service
- Taxation in the United States
- Islamic economic jurisprudence
