= Implied level of government service =

The implied level of government service is the value of government benefits and services provided a person, partnership, corporation, or other legal entity over a given period of time, including the proportional value of general governmental expenses and social welfare costs.

The implied level of government service may be directly calculated in some cases, and approximated in others. For instance, a state park that is dependent on visitor fees for operation could divide the yearly operational cost by the number of expected user days, and charge a daily tax or fee based on that calculation. This fee for service is directly calculated.

A city could have multiple services and social welfare expenditures—police, fire, library, refuse removal, and emergency food and housing support—and the exact service to individual taxpayers in those areas might be difficult or impossible to track. The city, however, can set a standard such as number of residential occupants, employee number, or developed land space, and then approximate service cost based on those conditions and set a commensurate tax assessment. An implied level of government service for city services still exists, but is approximated.

A city resident may rarely use the library, never have to call the police or fire departments, and never need welfare assistance. But the resident still benefits, indirectly, from the service availability, social order, and economic stability those city services provide. As long as the assessment calculation is logical and proportional, the assessment would be related to an implied level of government service.

The concept of implied level of government service is related to the benefits principle of equity, where the proceeds of a tax are directly allocated to a corresponding government service—such as a gas tax financing construction and maintenance of roads. Both implied level of government service and the benefits principle are related to the concept of rational economic exchange.

== See also ==
- Income tax
- Rational economic exchange
- Taxation in the United States
