= Friedrich von Wieser =

Austrian economist (1851–1926)

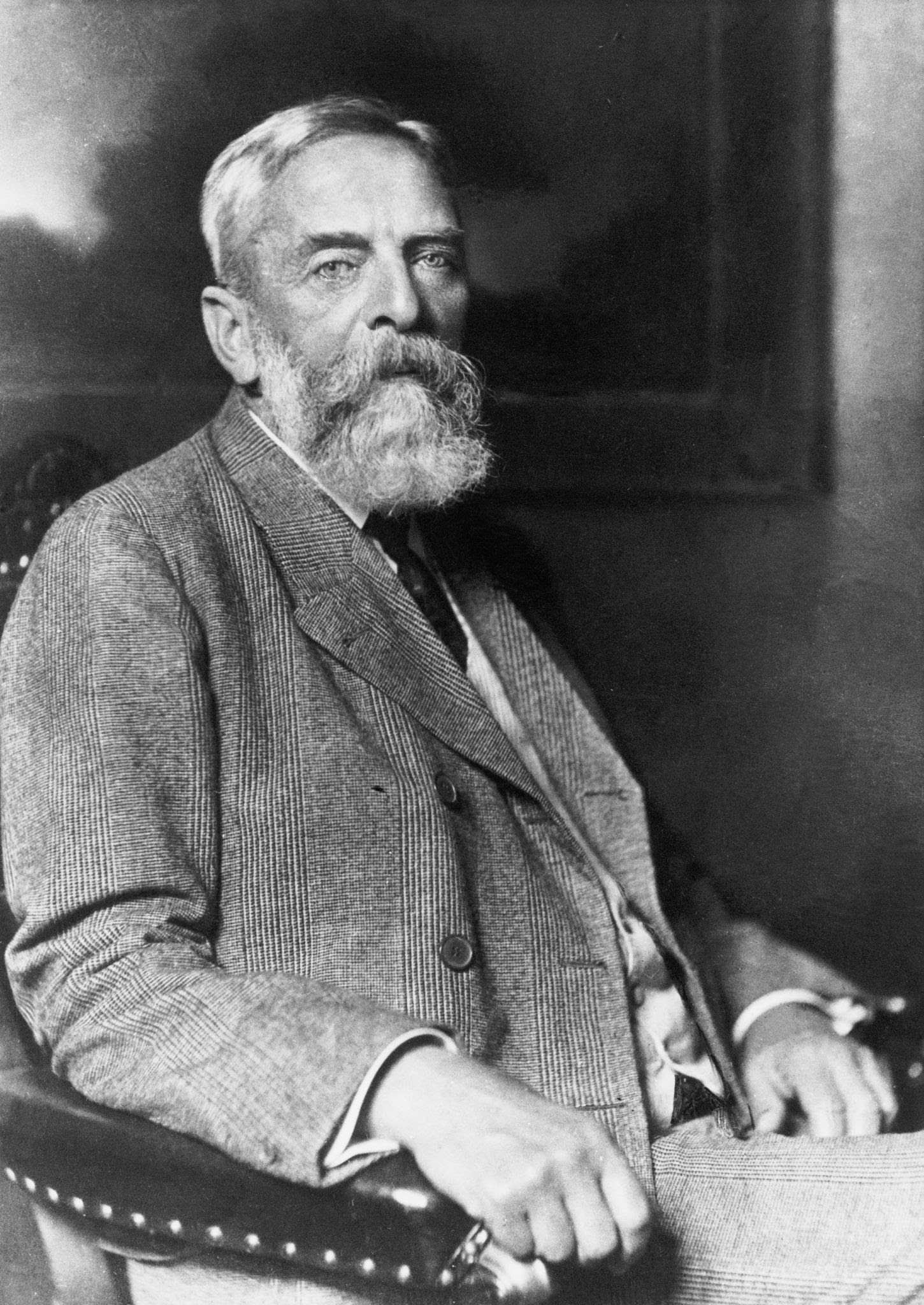
- Born: Friedrich Wieser; 10 July 1851; Vienna, Austrian Empire
- Died: 22 July 1926 (aged 75); St. Gilgen, Austria

Academic background
- Education: University of Vienna (Dr. jur., 1872)
- Influences: Carl Menger; Eugen von Böhm-Bawerk

Academic work
- School or tradition: Austrian School; Lausanne School

Friedrich von Wieser (German: [fɔn ˈviːzɐ]; 10 July 1851 – 22 July 1926) was an Austrian economist.

Born in Vienna, the son of Privy Councillor Leopold von Wieser, a high official in the war ministry, he first trained in sociology and law. In 1872, the year he took his degree, he encountered Austrian-school founder Carl Menger's Grundsätze and switched his interest to economic theory. Wieser held posts at the universities of Vienna and Prague until succeeding Menger in Vienna in 1903, where along with his brother-in-law Eugen von Böhm-Bawerk he shaped the next generation of Austrian economists including Ludwig von Mises, Friedrich Hayek and Joseph Schumpeter in the late 1890s and early 20th century. He was the Austrian Minister of Commerce from August 30, 1917, to November 11, 1918.

Wieser is renowned for two main works, Natural Value, which carefully details the alternative-cost doctrine and the theory of imputation; and his Social Economics (1914), an ambitious attempt to apply it to the real world. His explanation of marginal utility theory was decisive, at least terminologically. It was his term Grenznutzen (building on von Thünen's Grenzkosten) that developed into the standard term "marginal utility", not William Stanley Jevons's "final degree of utility" or Menger's "value". His use of the modifier "natural" indicates that he regarded value as a "natural category" that would pertain to any society, no matter what institutions of property had been established.

The economic calculation debate started with his notion of the paramount importance of accurate calculation to economic efficiency. Above all, to him prices represented information about market conditions and are thus necessary for any sort of economic activity. Therefore, a socialist economy would require a price system in order to operate. He also stressed the importance of the entrepreneur to economic change, which he saw as being brought about by "the heroic intervention of individual men who appear as leaders toward new economic shores". This idea of leadership was later taken up by Joseph Schumpeter in his treatment of economic innovation.

Unlike most other Austrian School economists, Wieser rejected classical liberalism, writing that "freedom has to be superseded by a system of order". This vision and his general solution to the role of the individual in history is best expressed in his final book The Law of Power, a sociological examination of political order published in his last year of life.

== Biography ==
Born in Vienna on 10 July 1851, Wieser spent his childhood and adolescence in the same city. He was interested since youth in law, history and sociology. He studied law at the University of Vienna beginning in 1868. His lifelong passion for political economy was first ignited when he read Herbert Spencer's Einleitung in das Studium der Soziologie (Introduction to the Study of Sociology).

After ten years of public service as a government employee, Wieser was awarded in 1875 a scholarship to the Heidelberg University in order to study political economy with Eugen Böhm von Bawerk, a friend from his youth who later became his brother-in-law. Both men were disciples of Carl Menger, Wieser's senior by 11 years. Although neither Wieser nor Böhm-Bawerk studied under Menger directly, they were greatly influenced by reading Menger's Grundsätze der Volkswirtschaftslehre (Principles of Economics) (1871), which was the work that had initially inspired the two men to study political economy. The three are considered the first generation of the Austrian School of economics.

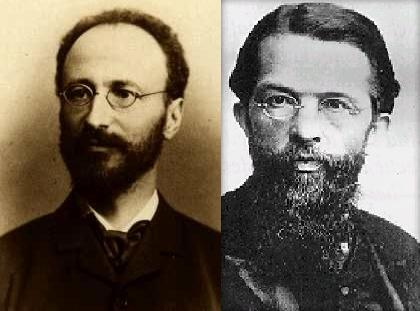
The two most influential figures in Wieser's life were his friend and brother-in-law Eugen Böhm von Bawerk and his teacher Carl Menger

After a successful postdoctoral habilitation in 1884, Über den Ursprung und die Hauptgesetze des wirthschaftlichen Werthes (On the Origin and the Main Laws of the Value of the Factors), a prelude to his value theory, Wieser was named that same year as an associate professor at Charles University in Prague, where he stayed until 1903 when he succeeded Menger at the University of Vienna.

In 1889, Wieser was named ordentlicher Professor (ordinary professor) at the Charles University. That same year, he also published his Der natürliche Werth (Natural Value), with which he initiated the debate on the value of factors of production and from which are derived two of his major contributions: his value theory and the related imputation theory.

Motivated by introducing the innovations of the Austrian School, he published Die österreichische Schule und die Theorie Wert (The Austrian School and the Theory of Value) in 1891 and Die Wert Theorie (The Value Theory) in 1892. Later, he collaborated in other notable works, such as Die Wiederaufnahme Barzahlungen der in Österreich-Ungarn (Resumption of payments species in Austria-Hungary) in 1893 and Die Theorie der städtische Grundrente (Theory of urban land rents) in 1909. He also served as editor for two articles in the Palgrave Dictionary of Economics: "Die österreichische Schule der Wirtschaft" ("The Austrian School of Economics") and "Böhm-Bawerk", both in 1884.

In 1903, Wieser was awarded a chair as a full professor at his alma mater, the University of Vienna, where he taught a new generation of economists, including Ludwig von Mises, Joseph Schumpeter and his most faithful disciple Friedrich Hayek. He developed a monetary theory inspired by the research of Carl Menger and he applied himself during the following years to the problems of the quantity theory of money. In his last 25 years, he dedicated himself to sociology, which he believed must go hand-in-hand with economics for the fullest understanding of human society. By combining these disciplines, he was able to forge a new vision of economic policy.

In 1911, he published Das Wesen und der Hauptinhalt der theoretischen Nationalokonomie (The Nature and Content of Theoretical Economics Major National) which preceded yet another major contribution, alternative cost (or opportunity cost) theory, which was drawn from his study Theorie der gesellschaftlichen Wirtschaft (Theory of Social Economy), published in 1914. It was here that he first coined the term "opportunity cost".

Also attributed to him is the creation of the term "marginal utility" (Grenznutzen) due largely to the influence of Léon Walras and Vilfredo Pareto, both of the Lausanne School. This has led some scholars to not consider his later works as belonging to the Austrian School. Even his disciple Ludwig von Mises said in his autobiography Memoirs (1978) that Wieser had misunderstood the gist of the subjectivism of the Austrian School and was actually a member of the Lausanne School.

In 1914, Eugen Böhm von Bawerk died, thus marking the end of a lifelong friendship and striking a hard blow to Wieser.

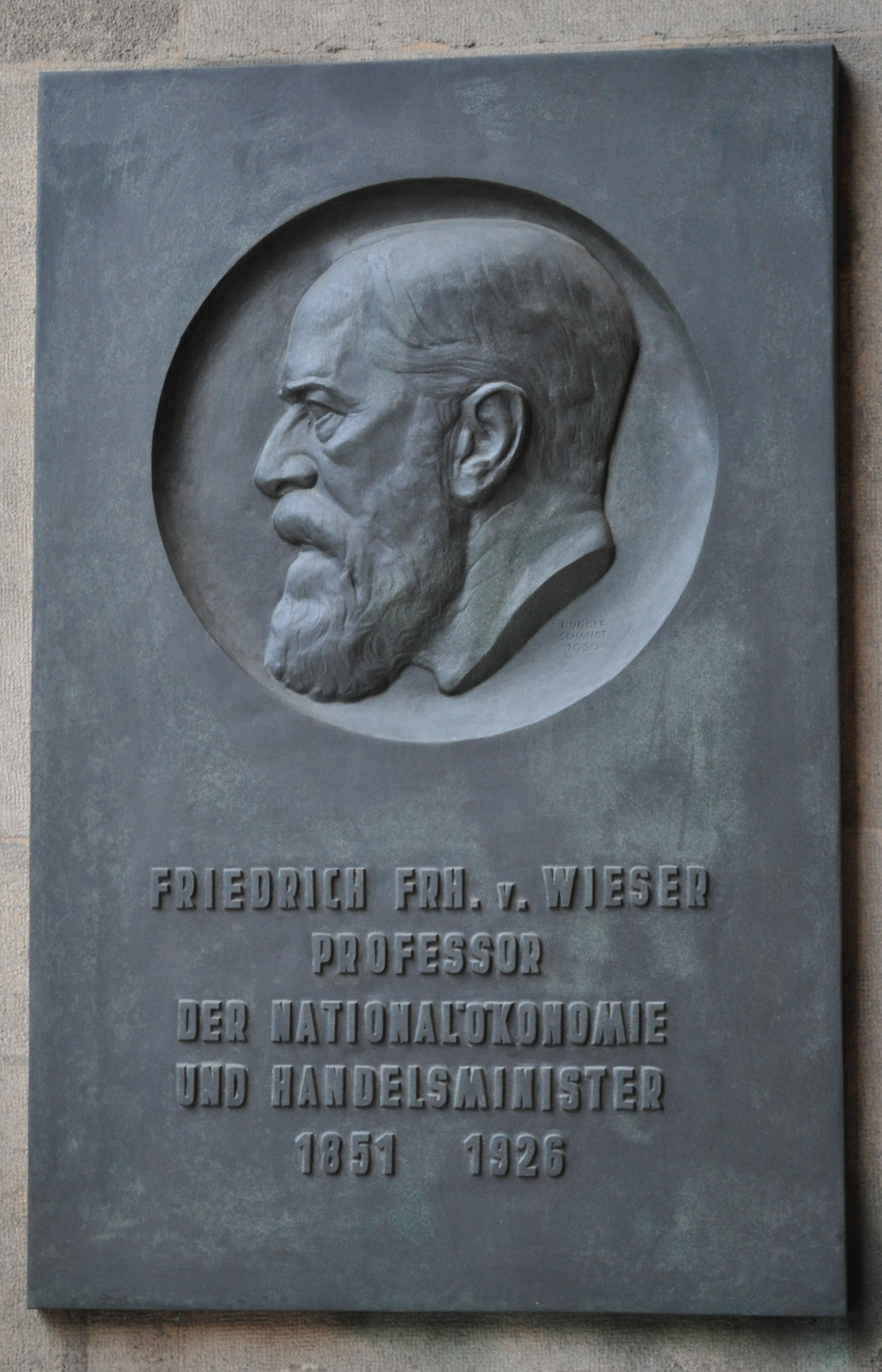
Monument at the University of Vienna

In 1917, Wieser was named a member of the Austrian House of Lords and granted the title of Baron. He was also appointed Minister of Commerce in the Austrian Cabinet, which post he held until the end of World War I in 1918. However, his activity was hindered by Richard Riedl, Energy Minister and clear proponent of economic interventionism, leaving only matters of secondary importance to Wieser's jurisdiction.

His last works were Das geschichtliche Werk der Gewalt (The History of State Power) in 1923 and a sociological study titled Das Gesetz der Macht (The Law of Power) in 1926.

Wieser died on 22 July 1926 in Salzburg, where he is buried. Two of his hitherto unpublished works were published posthumously, namely Geld (Money) in 1927, which summarizes his monetary theory; and Gesammelte Abhandlungen (Collected Papers) in 1929. This latter book included a tribute resulting from the collaboration of renowned economists like Knut Wicksell, but it was censored during World War II.

== Achievements ==
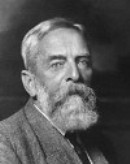
Wieser coined the terms "marginal utility" and "opportunity cost"

Wieser's most famous contributions are the imputation theory drawn from his 1889 work Der natürliche Werth (Natural Value) and the Alternative Cost (or Opportunity Cost) Theory drawn from his 1914 work Theorie der gesellschaftlichen Wirtschaft (Social Economics) in which he coined the term "opportunity cost". He is credited with the economic distinction between public goods and private goods subsequently used by Friedrich August von Hayek and eight of his disciples, and with developing the concept of marginal utility (Grenznutzen).

Wieser also stressed the importance of the entrepreneur to economic change, which he saw as being caused by "the heroic intervention of individual men who appear as leaders at new economic frontiers". This idea of management was later expounded upon by Joseph Alois Schumpeter in his treatment of economic innovation. Value theory was revolutionary because it opened the debate on the question of economic value, introducing an objective calculation to a subjective theory. It was one of the first mathematical solutions to the problem of determining prices for factors of production. His imputation theory amended possible errors in the theory of his teacher Carl Menger and is still used today in microeconomics in consumer research to calculate the systematic replacement of factors of production.

Another of Wieser's fundamental contributions to economics is the alternative cost theory (now called the opportunity cost theory), which had been ignored by Alfred Marshall and British economists. Based on the work of Vilfredo Pareto, Wieser created the concepts of marginal utility and opportunity cost, which led economists to the study and analysis of scarcity and the allocation of scarce resources.

Wieser thus perfected the theory of Carl Menger by introducing a definition of cost, the opportunity cost, compatible with the theory of marginal utility. He also used Carl Menger's monetary theory from which he devised his own monetary theory presenting a study of possible influences on monetary value that can change the relationships between natural and monetary economics.

Wieser's most important contributions is that thanks to his familiarity with sociology he combined the Austrian theory of utility with an evolutionary theory of institutions offering solutions to the paradox between private property and the maximization of utility. Wieser said that idealized classical and neoclassical models neglect basic concepts such as the possibility of monopolies and the existence of economies of scale. Wieser claimed that idealized refined and self-contained models may not be useful tools for economic policy, resulting therefore in a suboptimal solution. In his treatise Theorie der Wirtschaft gesellschaftliche (Theory of Social Economy), he posited the concept of social economy (gesellschaftliche Wirtschaft) using the performance of intervention in certain cases as a benchmark to assess policy effectiveness.

== Economic theories ==
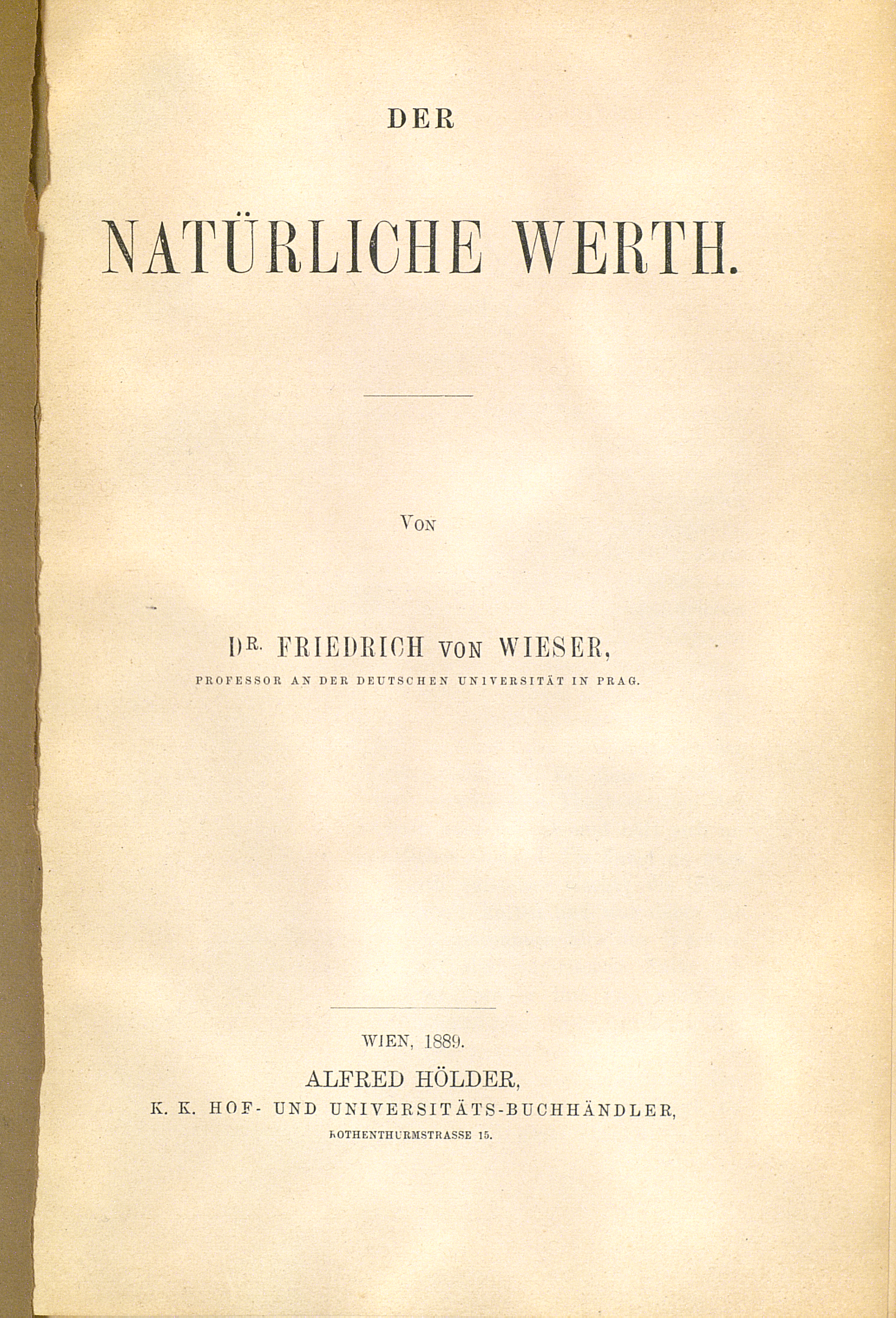
Der natürliche Werth, 1889

From his book Der natürliche Werth (Natural Value), published in Vienna in 1889, are extracted two of Wieser's three relevant theories, his value theory and the imputation theory, although both had had their geneses in previous studies. Adding to his contribution was also the theory originally known as the alternative cost theory (now called the opportunity cost theory), which was published in 1914 in gesellschaftliche Theorie der Wirtschaft (Theory of Social Economy). Finally, also worth mentioning is his monetary theory.

=== Value theory ===
Wieser's value theory attempts to establish a method for calculating economic value and states that the factors of production have a value due to the utility they have conferred on the final product, i.e. marginal utility, as opposed to the theory held by his teacher Carl Menger which states that the value factor is the value of the input when contributed to the final product. Wieser's value theory was presented along with his imputation theory in his work Der natürliche Werth (Natural Value), published in Vienna in 1889, although his examination of the subject begins in his 1884 postdoctoral study Über den Ursprung und die Hauptgesetze wirthschaftlichen des Werther (On the Origin and the Principal Laws of the Value of Factors).

Wieser asserts that natural value (natürliche Wert) is a neutral phenomenon, independent of the economic system. His idea of natural value tends to highlight how the value of property is continuously dependent on the distribution of income between different social classes, so that in the presence of a situation greatly lacking in equidistribution, goods or services provided with little social utility can be of great value and vice versa.

The economy deals with a social process and therefore must be based on a concept of social economics (gesellschaftliche Wirtschaft), which implies certain institutional actions. In the first part of his treatise Theorie der gesellschaftlichen Wirtschaft (Theory of Social Economics), Wieser carefully explains his view of general economic equilibrium. Aware of the idealized assumptions of this economy, he seeks to define with pinpoint accuracy the conditions under which resources would be allocated to ensure the highest possible utility. Social economics should therefore serve as the benchmark for evaluating the efficacy of administrative intervention in the market economy:

Most theorists, especially those of the Austrian School, have tacitly made the same abstraction. In particular, the opinions that consider price to be a social test of value [...]. Many theorists have written their own Communist theory of value without knowing it.

— Friedrich von Wieser, Der Natürliche Werth (Natural Value), 1914

This assertion is based on the fact that for Wieser natural value would exist in a perfect communist state due to the absence of inequalities of wealth and error. In this case, value would result only from the available quantity and from profits. However, he states that in the real world natural value is only one element in the formation of price. Other factors that influence prices are the distribution of purchasing power, errors, fraud and coercion.

His idea of natural value highlights how the economic value of property changes depending on the distribution of income between different social classes so that when income distribution is far from equal, goods or services provided with little social utility can be of great value and vice versa. Therefore, Wieser explicitly states his assumptions considering the cases in which the exchange value (price) differs from the real value (marginal utility):

- Antinomy of value. If monopolies arise then the individual entrepreneur will be able to increase his own utility at the expense of social utility, thus creating a state of antinomy. Friedrich argues that competition can correct this because it reduces the entrepreneurs economic power and forces prices to fall.
- Disparity in the purchasing power of consumers leads to over-produced goods to meet the needs of persons with high ability to pay, and too few goods to meet the needs of poor people.

Instead of the things that would be more useful, there are things that pay better. The greater the difference in wealth, the more striking are the anomalies of production. The economy provides luxury to the capricious and greedy, while it is deaf to the needs of the miserable and poor. It is therefore the distribution of wealth that decides what will be produced, and leads to a consumer of a more anti-economic variety: a consumer wastes on unnecessary, guilty enjoyment that which could have served to heal the wounds of poverty.

— Friedrich von Wieser, Der Natürliche Werth (The Natural Value), 1914

Some economists of the Austrian School maintained that the value of the factors of production is not the individual contribution of each factor in the final product, but rather the value of the most valuable use that can be made of the last good (the marginal utility before reaching the Pareto optimal point). The opposing view held by the classical economists such as Adam Smith is the labor theory of value.

There are practical applications such as:

- Coined the term "marginal utility" and gave shape to the concept.
- Was revolutionary because it provided a new insight into the debate on the issue of economic value.
- Established assumptions concerning intervention, explicitly considering cases where the exchange value (price) differs from the actual value (marginal utility).
- Tried to provide a solution to the paradox of private property and maximizing utility.
- Still relevant today, especially in the field of study of consumer microeconomics.

=== Imputation theory ===
Wieser based his theory of imputation on the assumption that factors of production are combined in fixed proportions in each industry, but at different rates in different industries. It was one of the first mathematical solutions to the problem of determining the prices of factors of production.

Previously, some economists such as Carl Menger and others of the Austrian School maintained that the value of factors of production is the individual contribution of each in the final product, but its value is the value of the last contributed to the final product (the marginal utility before reaching the point Pareto optimal). Thus, Wieser identified a flaw in the theory of imputation as expounded by his teacher Carl Menger as overvaluation may occur if one is confronted with economies where profits jump (maximums and minimums in his utility function, where its second derivative equals 0). Wieser suggested as an alternative the simultaneous solution of a system of industrial equations.

- Industry 1: X + Y = 300
- Industry 2: 6X + Z = 900
- Industry 3: 4Y + 3Z = 1700 ⇒ X = 100, Y = 200, Z = 300.

Given that a factor is used in the production of a range of first-order goods, its value is determined by the good that is worth the least among all the goods in the range. This value is determined at the margin, the marginal utility of the last unit of the least valuable good produced by the factor. In connection with his opportunity cost, the value so derived represents an opportunity cost across all industries, and the values of the factors of production and goods are determined in the whole system. Thus, supply and demand do not develop into the determinants of value; the determinant of value is the marginal utility.

The following can be considered applications of Wieser's theory of imputation:

- Linear programming, which deals with the case of discontinuous replacement of the factors. This approach is essentially the application of Wieser's theory of imputation to a single company. The business problem is to maximize total output by a set of linear constraints.
- Albert Aftalion used the theory as an argument against socialism in his 1923 work Les fondements du Socialisme: Étude critique (The Foundations of Socialism: Critical Study). This work states that prices provide key information on the conditions of the market and are necessary for any economic activity. A socialist system that purported to be effective would have to use a price system to operate.

=== Alternative cost theory ===
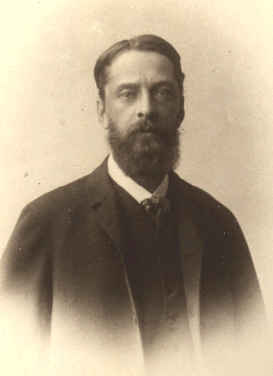
Wieser is remembered chiefly for the imputation theory, the alternative (or opportunity) cost theory and his monetary theory

The alternative cost theory (or opportunity cost theory) is a theory of enormous importance that comes from his Theorie der gesellschaftlichen Wirtschaft (Theory of Social Economy), published in 1914, although his arguments were foreshadowed in his work Das Wesen und der Hauptinhalt der theoretischen Nationalokonomie (The Nature and Main Content of Theoretical State Economics), published in 1911. Wieser coined the term "opportunity cost" and performed a detailed study of the subject.

Opportunity cost is associated with a famous controversy from the early 20th century, where disciples of English economist Alfred Marshall were opposed to the continental economists of the Austrian School, the head of which was Friedrich von Wieser, with his theory of alternative or opportunity cost. The debate focused on the following points:

- For the English, cost was a technical concept, the spending needed to produce something.
- For the Austrians, cost was a result of demand, as this would determine the level of production, depending on the willingness of buyers to pay that cost. Since demand is dependent upon the action of buyers, utility would determine a thing's cost rather than technology. In this context, the Austrian concept of opportunity cost claimed to ruin the British parametric concept of cost. The opportunity cost would be that which the purchaser would willingly forgo in agreeing to pay the cost of the option chosen.

The most notable feature of the concept is that opportunity cost would only make sense if the opportunity were fixed or reasonably limited. That is, if there is a conflict in performing multiple investments or actions, simultaneously or consecutively, it would not be feasible to have to choose among all the alternatives.

Thus, if a person has several options, you can calculate the opportunity cost of choosing one, but can we calculate a universal opportunity cost, which would include all the options? The prevailing opinion was that the opportunity cost could not be applied outside of cases of limited resources. This led some economists to limit the object of economics to "exceptional" resource situations (an idea still present in all economics textbooks). Still unknown are the consequences that might follow from an economic science that has no fixed limits outside of the economic system in terms of availability of goods.

There are practical applications such as:

- Wieser coined the term "opportunity cost".
- Wieser gave shape to the theory that marked the beginning of the distinction between accounting cost ("the cost of production") and economic cost ("the cost of production" + the opportunity cost of not being able to obtain alternative).

=== Monetary theory ===
Wieser also developed a monetary theory. It was inspired by the research of Carl Menger, in particular by his study of currency, which discussed both the historical evolution of money and the theory of its value. Wieser used the theory of marginal utility as a basis for his monetary theory. It was initially rejected; in fact, some authors tried to prove that marginalism necessarily failed when used as a basis for building such theories. However, his disciple Ludwig von Mises studied Wieser's theory and fleshed it out, creating the complex upon which he built the German concept of Geld (money).

Wieser conducted a further study on the effects of change in a currency's value on the relationship between the natural economy and the monetary economy.

There are practical applications such as:

- It was later applied to the problem of the quantity theory of money.
- It provided a new monetary theory within the Austrian School and conducted a useful study on one specific type of possible influence on monetary value.
- Provided a basis for a further and still relevant study of monetary theory by his pupil Ludwig von Mises.

== Social economics ==
In his later years, Wieser ventured into the study of Sociology, and this resulted in his 1914 publication, Theorie der gesellschaftlichen Wirtschaft (Theory of Social Economy), from which is derived his theory of alternative cost or opportunity. Das Gesetz der Macht (The Law of Power), published in 1926, was his latest publication, a great sociological study from which we draw the following conclusions.

Wieser tried to explain the relationships and social forces through the study of history, and he concluded that economic forces held a prominent role in social evolution. Despite his interest in collective goals, such as economic well-being, Wieser adopted an individual approach, explicitly rejecting collectivism, approaching a more liberal stance and establishing the essential difference between social economics in general and socialist economics.

Social economy (in the original German, Gesellschaftliche Wirtschaft) treats humanity as a whole as an ideal economic subject and contrasts it with nature, so that considerations of conflicting interests or economic justice become as irrelevant as they would to the economy of Robinson Crusoe:

But this broad economy is guided by a single mind. It answers its purpose in an unimpeachable manner because a systematic and penetrating mind guides it. This director foresees ends, weighs them without error or passion and maintains a discipline which ensures that all directions are executed with the utmost precision and skill and without loss of energy. We shall further assume that all requisite individual forces are placed at the disposal of this social management as cheerfully as though enlisted in their individual interest.

— Friedrich von Wieser, Theorie der gesellschaftlichen Wirtschaft (Social Economics), 1914

For Wieser, the individual is the root of all decisions. Decisions are made in the face of certain restrictions. Institutions are what define the restrictions on individual decisions. The reflection of these findings in political economy is apparent in actions such as:

- The regulation of imperfectly competitive firms whenever there are benefits of capital that are being lost.
- Progressive taxation based on decreasing marginal utility. The state should not try to offset all the inequalities of income and property by means of progressive taxation, but rather progressive taxation should be developed within the doctrine of diminishing marginal utility, i.e. every new tax adds a certain diminishing amount of utility. Thus, an unconscionable progressive tax, for example on the wealthy, would violate the spirit of privacy of Wieser's social economics.
- The duty of the state as producer of public goods. Wieser created the distinction between public goods and private goods that in the future would be seized upon by his disciple Friedrich Hayek.
- Intervening in the balance of social power between companies and unions for the benefit of workers, who could otherwise only hope to earn their marginal productivity.

These conditions, under which resources would be allocated to ensure the greatest value, describe his model of an ideal economy, which he calls social economics in the first part of his treatise entitled Theorie der gesellschaftlichen Wirtschaft (Theory of Social Economics). He made idealized assumptions using his model as the benchmark standard for evaluating the effectiveness of administrative intervention in the market economy.

Thus Wieser's Social Economics is, in effect, a socialist economy in which, to achieve greater productivity, scarce resources are assigned by an omnipresent, benevolent planner with direct and accurate insight sufficient to know the intensities of satisfactions and needs experienced by individual members of society, which all have exactly the same tastes and the same scales of utility and receive the same incomes. Moreover, their directions are followed without question by a completely docile workforce.

A particular aspect that makes Wieser's position a very particular one in the context of the Austrian school is his defense of intervention of the state to protect specific interests. Thus, in Social Economics he emphatically stated

That the state, as the historically evolved organ of the common power, is bound to take whatever measures may be at its disposal for the protection of the common interest against the despotic powers of capitalism, requires no further proof.

Wieser defended the intervention of the state in general when it was demanded by social or national interest and particularly for the protection of nascent industries.

== Wieser and the new liberalism ==
When labeling Wieser a "neoliberal", particular emphasis is placed on the definition of Ludwig von Mises. The English edition of his 1927 book, Liberalismus, uses the term "neoliberalism" to translate what Mises called in German neuer Liberalismus (new liberalism). In this book, Mises uses the term to designate socialists posing as liberals (a term he later replaced with "pseudoliberals"), leaving in Mises's view Wieser under this definition for being a Fabian socialist. Also in his later book Socialism, he applies the neoliberal label to liberal supporters of the then new subjective theory of value, including Carl Menger and Wieser.

Wieser believed that he could contribute to a return to liberal policies, both by explaining his economic vision in his books and articles as well as by teaching it in his role as university professor at the University of Prague and University of Vienna. In addition, his positions within the Austrian ministries allowed him to adopt more or less liberal economic policies. However, it was his liberal vision that separated him from the British economists of his era, discarding classical and neoclassical idealized models that did not contemplate the possibility of monopolies or the existence of economies of scale:

Chaos [referring to classical liberalism] has to be replaced by a system of order.

— Friedrich von Wieser, Theorie der gesellschaftlichen Wirtschaft (Theory of Social Economy), 1914

Wieser did not acknowledge essentialism or any teleological version of causality. As opposed to the historical method of the German historicist school, he developed a logical method, with both its deductive slope as well as its inductive slope (see interpolation and extrapolation). Economics has, like Mathematics and Logic, an a priori character rather than the empirical character of science. Thus, empirical phenomena are considered continuously variable, meaning that social developments have no parameters or constants, only variables, which makes it very difficult, if not impossible, to extract historical laws or make predictions. This point is the epicenter of the methodological discussion between the Austrian School and the German School. In what little Wieser wrote about methodology, he stated that economics is a kind of applied psychology for which the procedure is introspection, claiming similarity between Economics and sociology in that both attempt to achieve a more successful social reality of man, promoting the idea of utility that reports on each good and each individual. Aside from abandoning essentialism, both Eugen von Böhm-Bawerk and Wieser advocated objectively considering subjective factors, setting aside ideas that believe in the existence of an objective superhuman (essentialism) and theories of subjective elements that are incapable of objective measures (teleology of causality).

== Legacy ==
Joseph Schumpeter stressed Wieser's originality, saying: "There is hardly another author who owes as little to other authors as Wieser, fundamentally to none except Menger and to him only a suggestion – with the result that for a long time many fellow economists did not know what to do with Wieser's work. Of his edifice, everything is his intellectual property, even where what he says has already been said before him".

== Works ==
- Wieser, Friedrich (1884). Über den Ursprung und die Hauptgesetze des wirtschaftlichen Werthes (in German). Wien: A. Hölder.
- Wieser, Friedrich (1889). Der natürliche Werth (in German). Wien: A. Hölder.
  - English Translation: William Smart, ed. (1893). Natural Value. Translated by Christian A. Malloch. London: Macmillan – via Internet Archive. ...
- Theorie der gesellschaftlichen Wirtschaft, 1914
  - English translation: Social Economics, 1927, translated by A. Ford Hinrichs, with a preface by Wesley Clair Mitchell. Full Text
- Das Gesetz der Macht, 1926;
  - English translation: The Law of Power, 1983, translated by W.E. Kuhn, edited with an introduction by Warren J. Samuels Full text
- Die österreichische Schule und die Werth Theorie (The Austrian School and the Value Theory), 1891.
- "The Austrian School and the Theory of Value", in The Economic Journal, Volume 1, 1891 (in Wikisource).
- Die Wert Theorie (The Value Theory), 1892.
- Wieser, Friedrich (1894). Die währungsfrage und die zukunft der österreichischungarischen valutareform (in German). Wien: F. Tempsky.
- Die Theorie der städtischen Grundrente (The Theory of Urban Ground Rent), 1909.
- Wieser, Friedrich von (1910). Recht und Macht, sechs Vorträge (in German). Leipzig: Duncker & Humblot.
- Das Wesen und der Hauptinhalt der theoretischen Nationalökonomie (The essence and the main content of theoretical economics), 1911.
- Wieser, Friedrich (1919). Österreichs Ende (in German). Berlin: Ullstein.
- Das geschichtliche Werk der Gewalt (The History of State Power), 1923.
- Die nationale Steuerleistung und der Landeshaushalt im Königreiche Böhmen: Antwort auf die Erwägungen (The National tax services and the state budget in the kingdom of Bohemia: Response to the considerations), 1923.
- Wieser, Friedrich (1926). Das Gesetz Der Macht (in German). Wien: Verlag von Julius Springer.

== See also ==
- List of Austrian scientists
