= Marginal value =

A marginal value is

1. a value that holds true given particular constraints,
2. the change in a value associated with a specific change in some independent variable, whether it be of that variable or of a dependent variable, or
3. [when underlying values are quantified] the ratio of the change of a dependent variable to that of the independent variable.

(This third case is actually a special case of the second).

In the case of differentiability, at the limit, a marginal change is a mathematical differential, or the corresponding mathematical derivative.

These uses of the term “marginal” are especially common in economics, and result from conceptualizing constraints as borders or as margins. The sorts of marginal values most common to economic analysis are those associated with unit changes of resources and, in mainstream economics, those associated with infinitesimal changes. Marginal values associated with units are considered because many decisions are made by unit, and marginalism explains unit price in terms of such marginal values. Mainstream economics uses infinitesimal values in much of its analysis for reasons of mathematical tractability.

== Quantified conception ==
Assume a functional relationship

$$y=f\left(x_1 ,x_2 ,\ldots,x_n \right)$$

=== Discrete change ===
If the value of $x_i$ is discretely changed from $x_{i,0}$ to $x_{i,1}$ while other independent variables remain unchanged, then the marginal value of the change in $x_i$ is

$$\Delta x_i =x_{i,1}-x_{i,0}$$

and the “marginal value” of $y$ may refer to

$$\Delta y=f\left(x_1 ,x_2 ,\ldots ,x_{i,1},\ldots,x_n \right)-f\left(x_1 ,x_2 ,\ldots ,x_{i,0},\ldots,x_n \right)$$

or to

$$\frac{\Delta y}{\Delta x}=\frac{f\left(x_1 ,x_2 ,\ldots ,x_{i,1},\ldots,x_n \right)-f\left(x_1 ,x_2 ,\ldots ,x_{i,0},\ldots,x_n \right)}{x_{i,1}-x_{i,0}}$$

==== Example ====
If an individual saw her income increase from $50000 to $55000 per annum, and part of her response was to increase yearly purchases of amontillado from two casks to three casks, then

- the marginal increase in her income was $5000
- the marginal effect on her purchase of amontillado was an increase of one cask, or of one cask per $5000.

=== Infinitesimal margins ===
If infinitesimal values are considered, then a marginal value of $x_i$ would be $dx_i$, and the “marginal value” of $y$ would typically refer to

$$\frac{\partial y}{\partial x_i}=\frac{\partial f\left(x_1 ,x_2 ,\ldots,x_n \right)}{\partial x_i}$$

(For a linear functional relationship $y = a + b\cdot x$, the marginal value of $y$ will simply be the co-efficient of $x$ (in this case, $b$) and this will not change as $x$ changes. However, in the case where the functional relationship is non-linear, say $y = a\cdot b^x$, the marginal value of $y$ will be different for different values of $x$.)

==== Example ====
Assume that, in some economy, aggregate consumption is well-approximated by

$$C=C\left(Y\right)$$

where

- $Y$ is aggregate income.

Then the marginal propensity to consume is

$$MPC=\frac{dC}{dY}$$

== See also ==
- Marginal concepts
