= Carl Menger =

Founder of the Austrian School of economics (1840–1921)

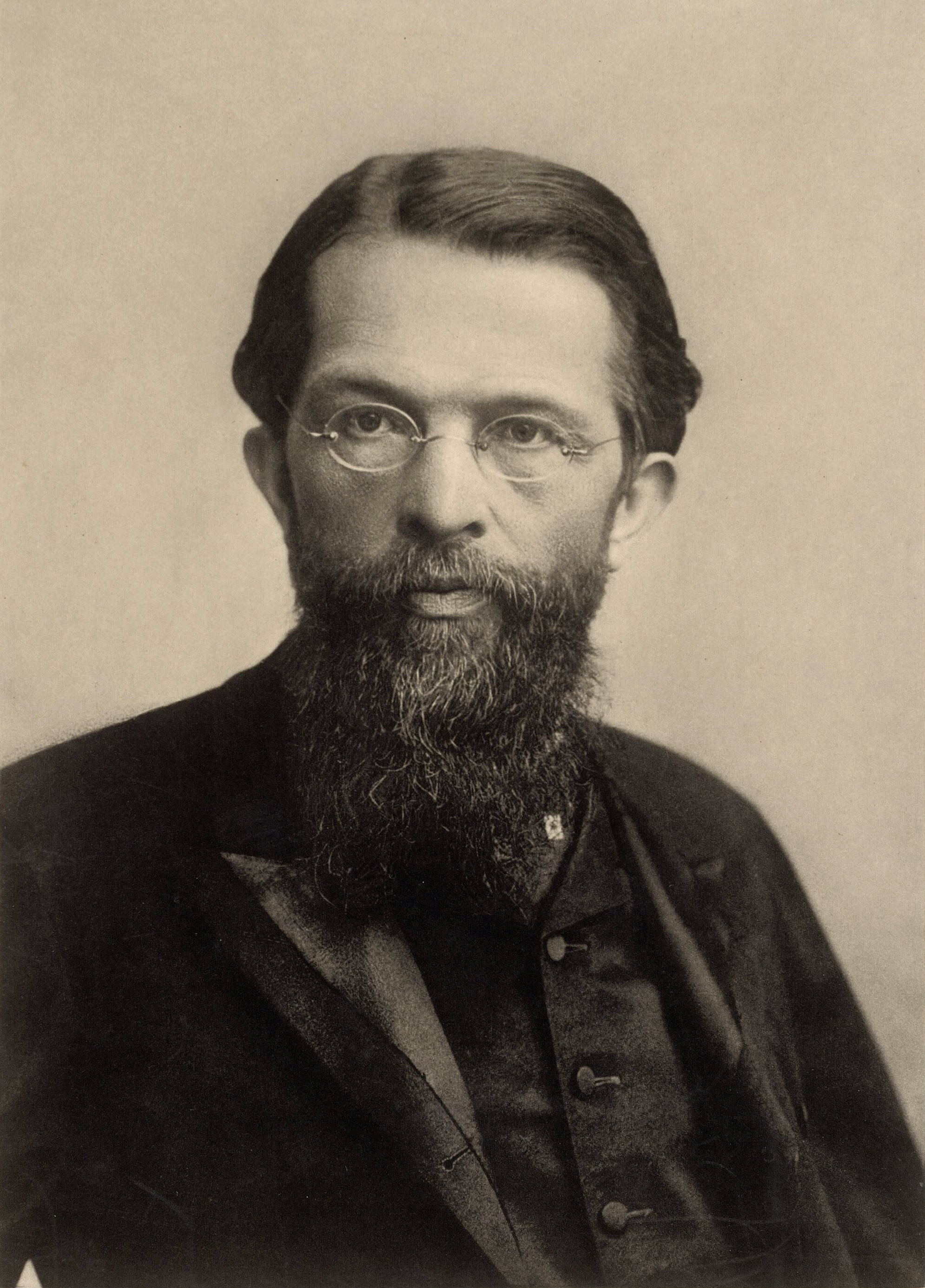
- Born: Carl Menger von Wolfensgrün; 23 February 1840; Neu Sandez, Kingdom of Galicia and Lodomeria, Austrian Empire (now Nowy Sącz, Poland)
- Died: 26 February 1921 (aged 81); Vienna, Austria
- Resting place: Vienna Central Cemetery

Academic background
- Education: Charles University; University of Vienna; Jagiellonian University
- Influences: Aristotle; Condillac; Smith; Kant; Brentano; Spencer

Academic work
- Discipline: Political economy
- School or tradition: Austrian school
- Notable students: Prince Rudolf
- Notable ideas: Marginal utility, subjective theory of value

Carl Menger von Wolfensgrün (/ˈmɛŋɡər/ MENG-ghər; German: [ˈmɛŋɐ]; 28 February 1840 – 26 February 1921) was an Austrian economist who contributed to the marginal theory of value. Menger is considered the founder of the Austrian school of economics.

In building his marginalist approach, Menger rejected many established views of classical economics. He directly disputed the view of the "German school" that economic theory could be derived from history. Departing from the cost-of-production theory of value—the prevailing theory of Adam Smith, David Ricardo, and Karl Marx—Menger's subjective theory of value emphasized role of mutual agreement in deriving prices. Although he had few readers outside Vienna until late in his career, disciples including Eugen von Böhm-Bawerk and Friedrich von Wieser brought his theories into wider readership. Friedrich Hayek wrote that the Austrian school's "fundamental ideas belong fully and wholly to Carl Menger."

Menger began his career as a lawyer and business journalist, during which he saw inconsistencies between existing economic theory and how buyers reasoned. After formal training in economics, he taught at the University of Vienna from 1872 to 1903. He became a private tutor and confidant to Rudolf von Habsburg, the crown prince of Austria.

== Biography ==
=== Family and education ===
Carl Menger von Wolfensgrün was born in the city of Neu-Sandez in the Kingdom of Galicia and Lodomeria, Austrian Empire, which is now Nowy Sącz in Poland. He was the son of a wealthy minor nobile family; his father, Anton Menger, was a lawyer. His mother, Caroline Gerżabek, was the daughter of a wealthy Bohemian merchant. He had two brothers, Anton and Max, both lawyers. His son, Karl Menger, was a mathematician who taught for many years at Illinois Institute of Technology.

After attending Gymnasium, he studied law at the universities of Prague and Vienna and later received a doctorate in jurisprudence from the Jagiellonian University in Kraków. In the 1860s, Menger left school and reported and analyzed market news, first at the Lemberger Zeitung in Lemberg, Austrian Galicia (now Lviv, Ukraine) and later at the Wiener Zeitung in Vienna.

=== Career ===
During the course of his newspaper work, he noticed a discrepancy between what the classical economics he was taught in school said about price determination and what real world market participants believed. In 1867, Menger began a study of political economy which culminated in 1871 with the publication of his Principles of Economics (Grundsätze der Volkswirtschaftslehre), thus becoming the father of the Austrian school of economics. It was in this work that he challenged classical cost-based theories of value with his theory of marginality – that price is determined at the margin.

In 1872 Menger was enrolled into the law faculty at the University of Vienna and spent the next several years teaching finance and political economy both in seminars and lectures to a growing number of students. In 1873, he received the university's chair of economic theory at the very young age of 33.

In 1876 Menger began tutoring Archduke Rudolf von Habsburg, the crown prince of Austria, in political economy and statistics. For two years, Menger accompanied the prince during his travels, first through continental Europe and then later through the British Isles. He is also thought to have assisted the crown prince in the composition of a pamphlet, published anonymously in 1878, which was highly critical of the higher Austrian aristocracy. His association with the prince would last until Rudolf's suicide in 1889.

In 1878 Rudolf's father, Emperor Franz Joseph I, appointed Menger to the chair of political economy at Vienna. The title of Hofrat was conferred on him, and he was appointed to the Austrian Herrenhaus in 1900.

==== Dispute with the historical school ====
Ensconced in his professorship, he set about refining and defending the positions he took and methods he utilized in Principles, the result of which was the 1883 publication of Investigations into the Method of the Social Sciences with Special Reference to Economics (Untersuchungen über die Methode der Socialwissenschaften und der politischen Oekonomie insbesondere). The book caused a firestorm of debate, during which members of the historical school of economics began to derisively call Menger and his students the "Austrian school" to emphasize their departure from mainstream German economic thought – the term was specifically used in an unfavourable review by Gustav von Schmoller.

In 1884 Menger responded with the pamphlet The Errors of Historicism in German Economics and launched the infamous Methodenstreit, or methodological debate, between the historical school and the Austrian school. During this time Menger began to attract like-minded disciples who would go on to make their own mark on the field of economics, most notably Eugen von Böhm-Bawerk, and Friedrich von Wieser.

In the late 1880s, Menger was appointed to head a commission to reform the Austrian monetary system. Over the course of the next decade, he authored a plethora of articles which would revolutionize monetary theory, including "The Theory of Capital" (1888) and "Money" (1892). Largely due to his pessimism about the state of German scholarship, Menger resigned his professorship in 1903 to concentrate on study.

== Economics ==
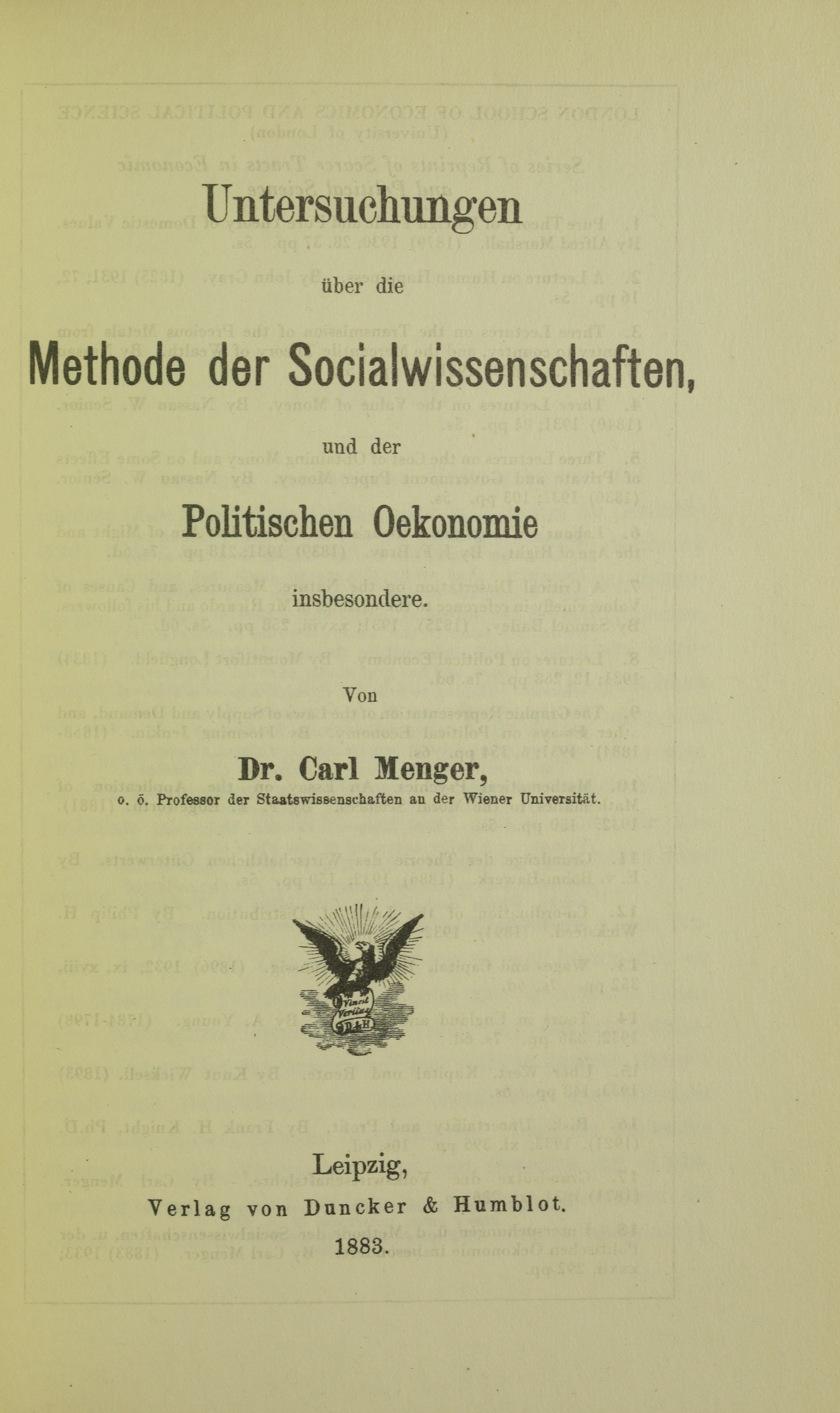
Untersuchungen über die Methode der Socialwissenschaften, und der Politischen Oekonomie insbesondere, 1933

Menger used his subjective theory of value to arrive at what he considered one of the most powerful insights in economics: "both sides gain from exchange." Unlike William Jevons, Menger did not believe that goods provide "utils," or units of utility. Rather, he wrote, goods are valuable because they serve various uses whose importance differs. Menger also came up with an explanation of how money develops that is still accepted by some schools of thought today.

=== Money ===
Menger believed that gold and silver were the precious metals that were adopted as money for their unique attributes like costliness, durability, and easy preservation, making them the "most popular vehicle for hoarding as well as the goods most highly favoured in commerce." Menger showed that "their special saleableness" tended to make the difference between supply and demand tighter than any other market good, which led to their adoption as a general medium of exchange and evolution in many societies as money.

== Works ==
- 1871 – Grundsätze der Volkswirthschaftslehre, Erster, Allgemeiner Theil. Wien: Wilhelm Braumüller. 1871 – via Internet Archive.; Translated as Principles of Economics, First, General Part. Translated by Dingwall, James; Hoselitz, Bert F. Glencoe, Illinois: The Free Press. 1950.
- 1883 – Untersuchungen über die Methode der Socialwissenschaften und der politischen Oekonomie insbesondere. Leipzig: Duncker & Humblot. 1883 – via Internet Archive.; Translated as Schneider, Louis, ed. (1963). Problems of Economics and Sociology [Investigations into the Method of the Social Sciences with Special Reference to Economics]. Translated by Nock, Francis J. Urbana: University of Illinois Press – via Internet Archive.
- 1884 – Die Irrthümer des Historismus in der deutschen Nationalökonomie. Wien: Alfred Hölder. 1884 – via Internet Archive.; Translated as Horn, Karen; Kolev, Stefan, eds. (2020). "The Errors of Historicism in German Economics". Econ Journal Watch. 17 (2). Translated by The Network for Constitutional Economics and Social Philosophy (NOUS): 442–507.
- 1887 - "Zur Kritik der Politischen Oekonomie". Zeitschrift fuer das Privat- und oeffentliche Recht der Gegenwart. 14: 555–585. 1887 – via HathiTrust.
- 1888 – "Zur Theorie des Kapitals". Jahrbücher für Nationalökonomie und Statistik. 51 (1): 1–49. 1888. doi:10.1515/jbnst-1888-0102.; Translated as The Theory of Capital
- 1892 – Menger, Karl (1892). "On the Origin of Money". The Economic Journal. 2 (6). Translated by Caroline A. Foley: 239–255. doi:10.2307/2956146. JSTOR 2956146.

== See also ==
- History of macroeconomic thought
- Historical school of economics

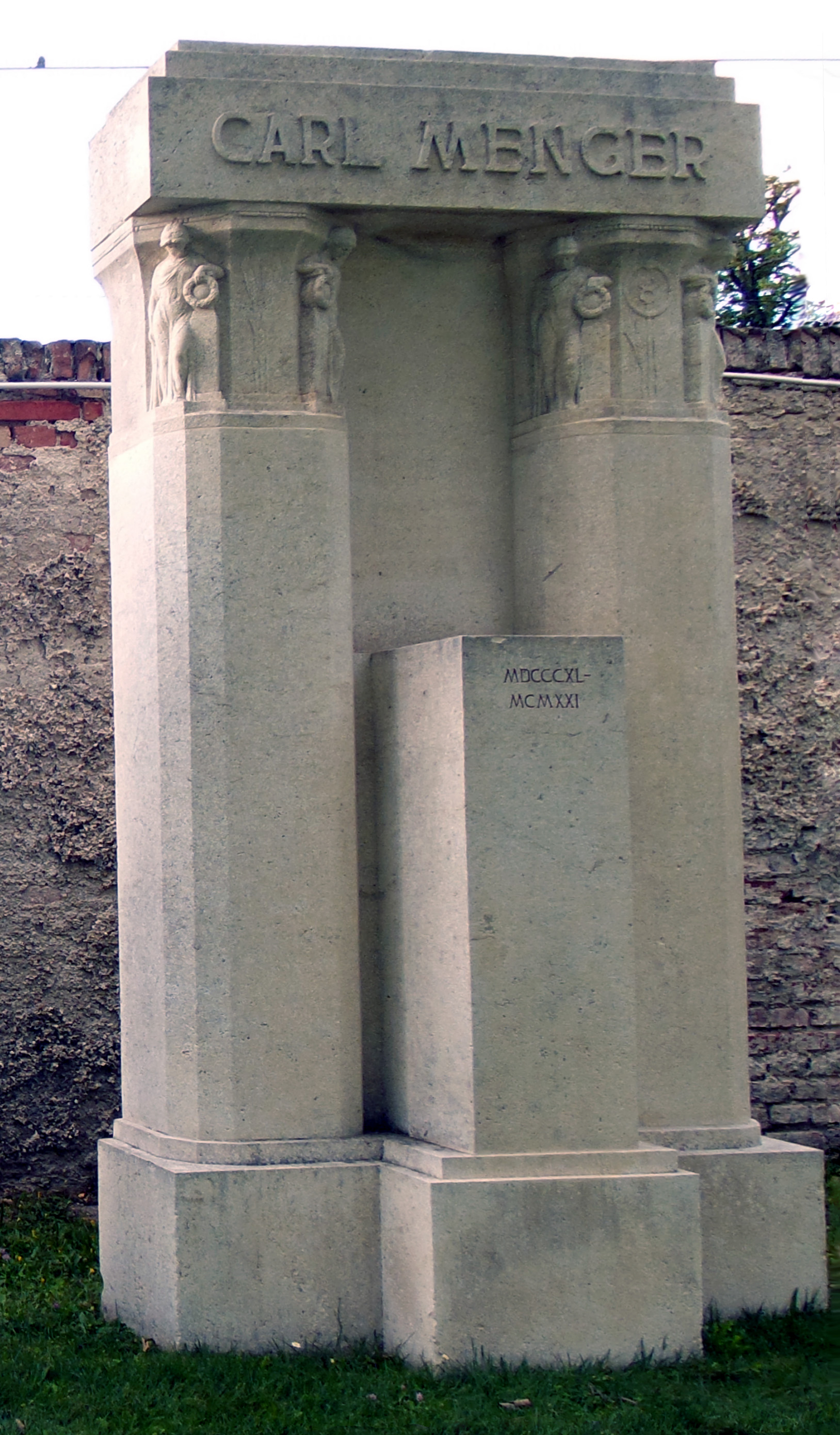
Carl Menger's grave at Vienna Central Cemetery
