= Paradox of value =

Contradiction between utility and price

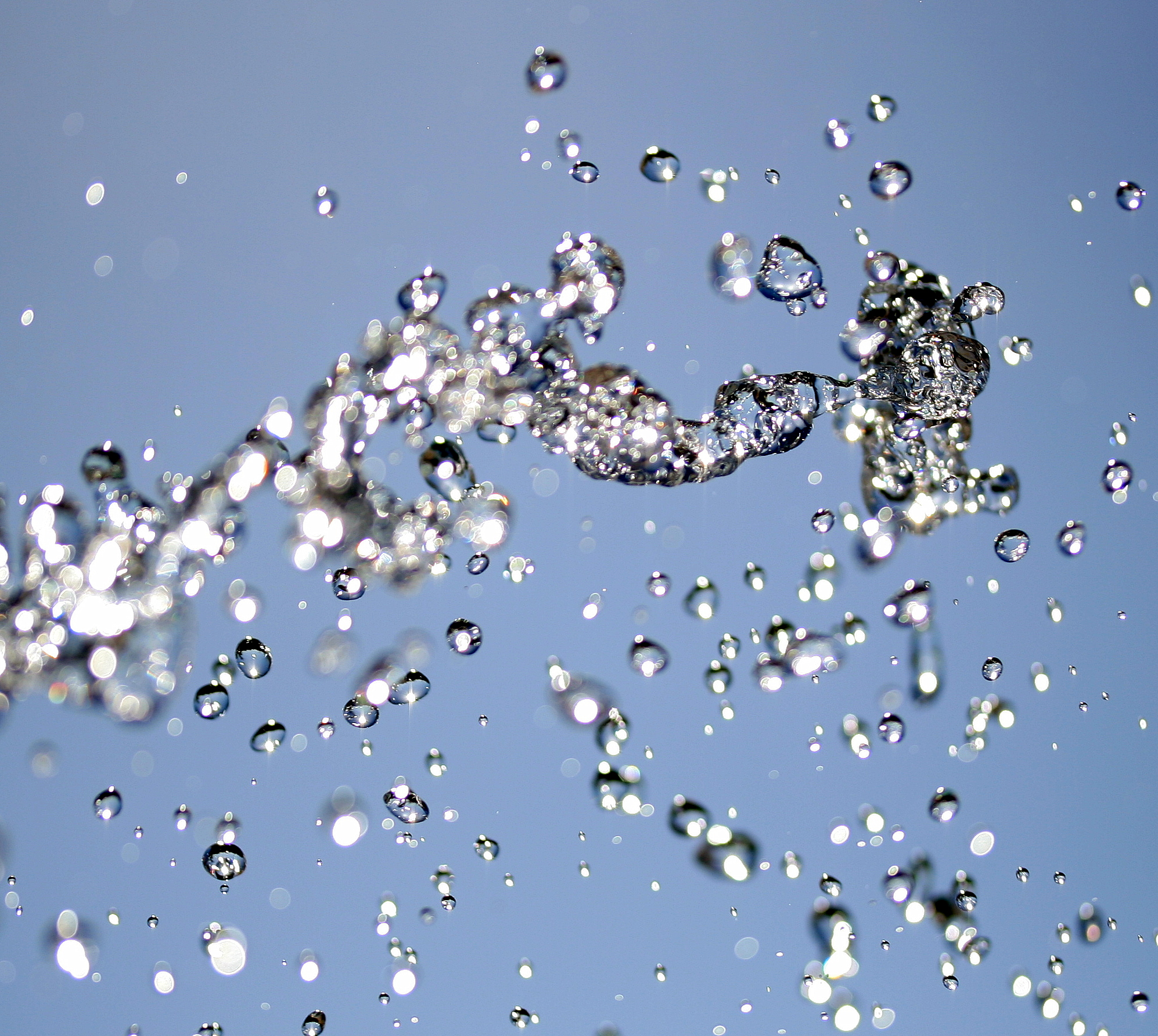
Water is a commodity that is essential to life. In the paradox of value, it is a contradiction that it is cheaper than diamonds, despite diamonds not having such an importance to life.

The paradox of value, also known as the diamond–water paradox, is the paradox that, although water is on the whole more useful in terms of survival than diamonds, diamonds command a higher price in the market. The philosopher Adam Smith is often considered to be the classic presenter of this paradox, although it had already appeared as early as Plato's Euthydemus. Nicolaus Copernicus, John Locke, John Law, and others had previously tried to explain the disparity.

== Labor theory of value ==
In a passage of An Inquiry into the Nature and Causes of the Wealth of Nations, Smith discusses the concepts of value in use and value in exchange, and observes how they tend to differ. He writes:

What are the rules which men naturally observe in exchanging [goods] for money or for one another, I shall now proceed to examine. These rules determine what may be called the relative or exchangeable value of goods.

The word value, it is to be observed, has two different meanings, and sometimes expresses the utility of some particular object, and sometimes the power of purchasing other goods which the possession of that object conveys. The one may be called "value in use;" the other, "value in exchange." The things which have the greatest value in use have frequently little or no value in exchange; on the contrary, those which have the greatest value in exchange have frequently little or no value in use. Nothing is more useful than water: but it will purchase scarcely anything; scarcely anything can be had in exchange for it. A diamond, on the contrary, has scarcely any use-value; but a very great quantity of other goods may frequently be had in exchange for it.

Furthermore, Smith explains the value in exchange as being determined by labor, stating: "The real price of every thing, what every thing really costs to the man who wants to acquire it, is the toil and trouble of acquiring it." Hence, Smith denied a necessary relationship between price and utility. Price on this view was related to a factor of production (namely labor) and not to the point of view of the consumer. Proponents of the labor theory of value see that as the resolution of the paradox.

== Marginalism ==
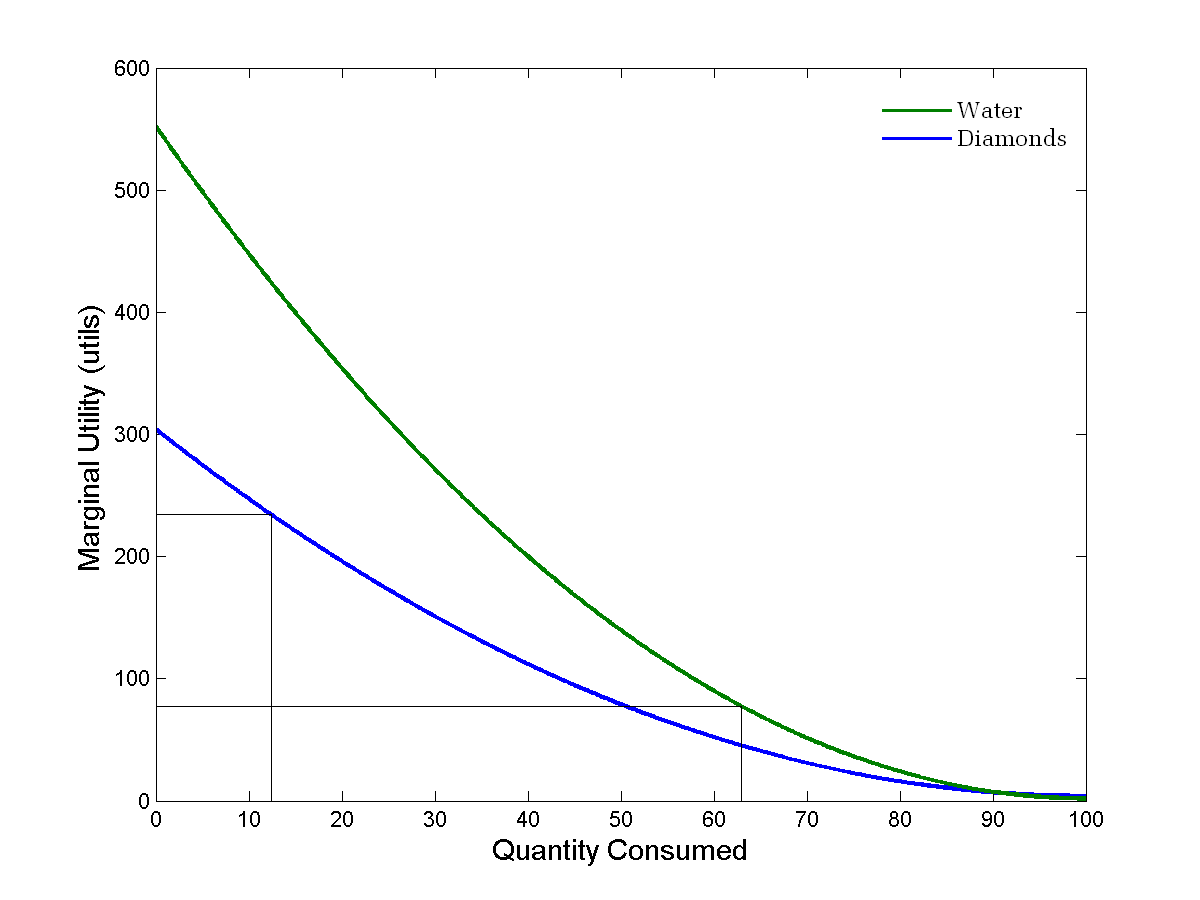
At low levels of consumption, water has a much higher marginal utility than diamonds and thus is more valuable. People usually consume water at much higher levels than they do diamonds and thus the marginal utility and price of water are lower than that of diamonds.

The theory of marginal utility, which is based on the subjective theory of value, says that the price at which an object trades in the market is determined neither by how much labor was exerted in its production nor on how useful it is on the whole. Rather, its price is determined by its marginal utility. The marginal utility of a good is derived from its most important use to a person. Thus, if someone possesses a good, they will use it to satisfy some need or want, starting with the one that takes highest priority. Eugen von Böhm-Bawerk illustrated this with the example of a farmer having five sacks of grain.

With the first, he will make bread to survive. With the second, he will make more bread, in order to be strong enough to work. With the next, he will feed his farm animals. The next is used to make whisky, and the last one he feeds to the pigeons. If one of those bags is stolen, he will not reduce each of those activities by one-fifth; instead, he will stop feeding the pigeons. Thus, the value of the fifth bag of grain is equal to the satisfaction he gets from feeding the pigeons. If he sells that bag and neglects the pigeons, his least productive use of the remaining grain is to make whisky, so the value of a fourth bag of grain is the value of his whisky. Only if he loses four bags of grain will he start eating less; that is the most productive use of his grain. The last bag of grain is worth his life.

In explaining the diamond-water paradox, marginalists explain that it is not the total usefulness of diamonds or water that determines price, but the usefulness of each unit of water or diamonds. It is true that the total utility of water to people is tremendous because they need it to survive; however, since water is in such large supply in the world, the marginal utility of water is low. In other words, people feel less urgency or enjoyment from consuming water since they know that water would continue to exist. Thus, consuming an extra unit of water would not generate an extra unit of usefulness and thus, an extra willingness to pay for it.

Any particular unit of water is worth less to people as the supply of water increases. On the other hand, diamonds are in much lower supply. They are of such low supply that the usefulness of one additional diamond is greater than the usefulness of one additional glass of water, which is in abundant supply. Thus, diamonds are worth more to people. Therefore, those who want diamonds are willing to pay a higher price for one diamond than for one glass of water, and sellers of diamonds ask a price for one diamond that is higher than for one glass of water. Conversely, a man dying of thirst in a desert would have greater marginal use for water than for diamonds so would pay more for water, perhaps up to the point at which he was no longer dying.

== See also ==
- Paradox of hedonism
