= Population pressure =

Term used to describe the effects of unsustainable population growth

Population pressure, a term summarizing the stress brought about by an excessive population density and its consequences, is used both in conjunction with human overpopulation and with other animal populations that suffer from too many individuals per area (or volume in the case of aquatic organisms). In the case of humans, absolute numbers of individuals may lead to population pressure, but the same is true for overexploitation and overconsumption of available resources and ensuing environmental degradation by otherwise-normal population densities. Similarly, when the carrying capacity of the environment goes down, unchanged population numbers may prove too high and again produce significant pressure.

Governments and international organizations have responded to increasing population pressure by implementing a range of policy measures that include family planning programs, investments in healthcare and education, and efforts to improve gender equality. These interventions aim to manage fertility rates and ensure sustainable development in high-density regions.

"Pressure" is to be understood metaphorically and hints at the analogy between a gas or fluid that under pressure will tend to escape a bounded container. Similarly, "population pressure" in animal populations in general usually leads to migration activity, and in humans, it may additionally cause land loss because of land conversion of previously-uninhabited areas and development. Advances in technology have also provided new tools to manage the effects of population pressure, including innovations in agriculture (such as vertical farming), water purification, urban planning, and clean energy. These technologies help support larger populations with fewer environmental consequences. However, responses to population pressure must also consider ethical concerns. Experts emphasize that policies should respect human rights and avoid coercive practices. Rights-based approaches, which focus on education, voluntary family planning, and community empowerment, are seen as more sustainable and just. When no space for evading the pressure is available, another severe consequence can be the reduction or even extinction of the population under pressure.

Based on ideas by Thomas Malthus as laid out in An Essay on the Principle of Population, Charles Darwin theorized that population pressure must generate a struggle for existence in which many individuals die, and better-adapted variants are more likely to survive and to reproduce.

== See also ==
- Malthusian catastrophe
- Population growth
- Overshoot (population)
- Sustainable population
