= World Scientists' Warning to Humanity =

1992 document on human carbon footprint

The "World Scientists' Warning to Humanity" was a document written in 1992 by Henry W. Kendall and signed by about 1,700 leading scientists. Twenty-five years later, in November 2017, 15,364 scientists signed "World Scientists' Warning to Humanity: A Second Notice" written by William J. Ripple and seven co-authors calling for, among other things, human population planning, and drastically diminishing per capita consumption of fossil fuels, meat, and other resources. (Note: Ripple 2017, pp. 1026–1028: "On the twenty-fifth anniversary of their call, we look back at their warning and evaluate the human response by exploring available time-series data. Since 1992, with the exception of stabilizing the stratospheric ozone layer, humanity has failed to make sufficient progress in generally solving these foreseen environmental challenges, and alarmingly, most of them are getting far worse (figure 1, file S1). Especially troubling is the current trajectory of potentially catastrophic climate change due to rising GHGs from burning fossil fuels (Hansen et al. 2013), deforestation (Keenan et al. 2015), and agricultural production—particularly from farming ruminants for meat consumption (Ripple et al. 2014). Moreover, we have unleashed a mass extinction event, the sixth in roughly 540 million years, wherein many current life forms could be annihilated or at least committed to extinction by the end of this century. Humanity is now being given a second notice, as illustrated by these alarming trends (figure 1). We are jeopardizing our future by not reining in our intense but geographically and demographically uneven material consumption and by not perceiving continued rapid population growth as a primary driver behind many ecological and even societal threats (Crist et al. 2017). By failing to adequately limit population growth, reassess the role of an economy rooted in growth, reduce greenhouse gases, incentivize renewable energy, protect habitat, restore ecosystems, curb pollution, halt defaunation, and constrain invasive alien species, humanity is not taking the urgent steps needed to safeguard our imperilled biosphere. As most political leaders respond to pressure, scientists, media influencers, and lay citizens must insist that their governments take immediate action as a moral imperative to current and future generations of human and other life. With a groundswell of organized grassroots efforts, dogged opposition can be overcome and political leaders compelled to do the right thing. It is also time to re-examine and change our individual behaviors, including limiting our own reproduction (ideally to replacement level at most) and drastically diminishing our per capita consumption of fossil fuels, meat, and other resources.") The second notice has more scientist cosigners and formal supporters than any other journal article ever published.

== First publication ==
In late 1992, the late Henry W. Kendall, a former chair of the board of directors of the Union of Concerned Scientists (UCS), wrote the first warning, "World Scientists' Warning to Humanity", which begins: "Human beings and the natural world are on a collision course." A majority of the Nobel Prize laureates in the sciences signed the document; about 1,700 of the world's leading scientists appended their signature.

It was sometimes offered in opposition to the Heidelberg Appeal—also signed by numerous scientists and Nobel laureates earlier in 1992—which begins by criticizing "an irrational ideology which is opposed to scientific and industrial progress, and impedes economic and social development." This document was often cited by those who oppose theories relating to climate change.

In contrast, the UCS-led petition contains specific recommendations: "We must, for example, move away from fossil fuels to more benign, inexhaustible energy sources to cut greenhouse gas emissions and the pollution of our air and water. ... We must stabilize population."

== Second notice ==
In November 2017, 15,364 scientists signed "World Scientists' Warning to Humanity: A Second Notice" written by lead author professor of ecology, William J. Ripple of Oregon State University, along with 7 co-authors calling for, among other things, limiting population growth, and drastically diminishing per capita consumption of fossil fuels, meat, and other resources. The second notice included 9 time-series graphs of key indicators, each correlated to a specific issue mentioned in the original 1992 warning, to show that most environmental issues are continuing to trend in the wrong direction, most with no discernible change in rate. The article included 13 specific steps humanity could take to transition to sustainability.

The second notice has more scientist cosigners and formal supporters than any other journal article ever published. The full warning was published in BioScience.

== 2019 warning on climate change and 2021 and 2022 updates ==
In November 2019, a group of more than 11,000 scientists from 153 countries named climate change an "emergency" that would lead to "untold human suffering" if no big shifts in action take place:

We declare clearly and unequivocally that planet Earth is facing a climate emergency. To secure a sustainable future, we must change how we live. [This] entails major transformations in the ways our global society functions and interacts with natural ecosystems.

The emergency declaration emphasized that economic growth and population growth "are among the most important drivers of increases in CO_{2} emissions from fossil fuel combustion" and that "we need bold and drastic transformations regarding economic and population policies".

A 2021 update to the 2019 climate emergency declaration focuses on 31 planetary vital signs (including greenhouse gases and temperature, rising sea levels, energy use, ice mass, ocean heat content, Amazon rainforest loss rate, etc), and recent changes to them. Of these, 18 are reaching critical levels. The COVID-19 lockdowns, which reduced transportation and consumption levels, had very little impact on mitigating or reversing these trends. The authors say only profound changes in human behavior can meet these challenges and emphasize the need to move beyond the idea that global heating is a stand alone emergency, and is one facet of the worsening environmental crisis. This necessitates the need for transformational system changes and to focus on the root cause of these crises, the vast human overexploitation of the earth, rather than just addressing symptom relief. They point to six areas where fundamental changes need to be made:

(1) energy — eliminating fossil fuels and shifting to renewables;
(2) short-lived air pollutants — slashing black carbon (soot), methane, and hydrofluorocarbons;
(3) nature — restoring and permanently protecting Earth's ecosystems to store and accumulate carbon and restore biodiversity;
(4) food — switching to mostly plant-based diets, reducing food waste, and improving cropping practices;
(5) economy — moving from indefinite GDP growth and overconsumption by the wealthy to ecological economics and a circular economy, in which prices reflect the full environmental costs of goods and services; and
(6) human population — stabilizing and gradually reducing the population by providing voluntary family planning and supporting education and rights for all girls and young women, which has been proven to lower fertility rates.

At the 30th anniversary of the World Scientists' Warning to Humanity, a second update to the climate emergency declaration concluded that "We are now at 'code red' on planet Earth".

== 2022 warning on population ==
In October 2022, Eileen Crist, William J. Ripple, Paul R. Ehrlich, William E. Rees, and Christopher Wolf all contributed to the Scientists' warning on population, published by Science of the Total Environment as "part of the ongoing series of scientists' warning publications," to address the negative impacts of population size and growth on the climate and biodiversity, which they posit "continues to be ignored, sidestepped, or denied." It calls for two actions that, if heeded, will stop population growth before the end of this century. Firstly, the authors issue a global appeal to all adults to have no more than one child as part of the transformative changes needed to mitigate both climate change and biodiversity loss. Secondly, the warning urges policy-makers to "implement population policies with two key female empowerment components," primarily improving education for young women and girls and providing high-quality family-planning services to all. It emphasizes that "the combination of institutional support to plan one's child-bearing choices and educational attainment, including enhanced opportunity for higher education for women, yields immediate fertility declines." It also posits that a sustainable human population, which according to environmental analysts is "one enjoying a modest, equitable middle-class standard of living on a planet retaining its biodiversity and with climate-related adversities minimized," is between 2 and 4 billion people.

The warning also advocates for combatting poverty, patriarchy and overconsumption by the affluent, and calls for a global wealth tax to be levied primarily against "wealthy nations, industries and people who have benefitted the most from humanity's massive-scale historical and contemporary use of fossil fuels" in order to expand "clean sanitation and water availability, food sovereignty, and electrification via renewables." It stresses that poverty alleviation must include the provision of basic public services, in particular healthcare and education.

== Scientists' Warning series ==
Following the publication of the World Scientists' Warning to Humanity (1992) and its update (2017), the Alliance of World Scientists (AWS) encouraged researchers to develop discipline-specific Scientists' Warning papers addressing focused environmental, ecological, and societal risks. These peer-reviewed articles form a recognised Scientists' Warning series, each explicitly framed as a contribution to the broader Warning movement. The AWS maintains an index of these articles on its official website.

Listed in reverse chronological order (most recent first).

- Foth, Marcus (2025). "A Scientist's Warning on Smart Cities: Rethinking Urban Sustainability for More-than-Human Futures". Journal of Urban Technology. 33: 141–157. doi:10.1080/10630732.2025.2575522. ISSN 1063-0732.
- Montefalcone, M.; Morri, C.; Bianchi, C.N. (2025). "Scientists' warning on sustainability: the ecologist point of view, with examples from marine ecosystems". Discover Sustainability. 6 (1) 279. Bibcode:2025DiSus...6..279M. doi:10.1007/s43621-025-01038-7.
- Samways, M.J.; Córdoba-Aguilar, A.; Deacon, C.; Alves-Martins, F.; Baird, I.R.C.; Barmentlo, S.H. (2025). "Scientists' warning on the need for greater inclusion of dragonflies in global conservation". Insect Conservation and Diversity. 18 (4): 465–484. doi:10.1111/icad.12819.
- Seralini, G.E.; Jungers, G.; Andersen, A.; Antoniou, M.; Aschner, M.; Bacon, M.H.; Bertrand, M.; Bohn, T.; Bonfleur, M.L.; Bücking, E.; Defarge, N. (2025). "Scientists' warning: we must change paradigm for a revolution in toxicology and world food supply". Environmental Sciences Europe. 37 (1): 182. Bibcode:2025ESEur..37..182S. doi:10.1186/s12302-025-01217-3. PMC 12807487. PMID 41551494.
- Theodoropoulos, A.; Stewart, K.A.; Wielstra, B. (2025). "Scientists' warning on genetic pollution". Discover Conservation. 2 (1) 20. Bibcode:2025DiCon...2...20T. doi:10.1007/s44353-025-00041-3. PMC 12139275. PMID 40476036.
- Vaccaro, C.A.; Courville, K. (2025). "El impacto al medio ambiente de los aparatos electrónicos: La advertencia de los científicos sobre los residuos electrónicos". REA: Revista Científica Especializada en Educación y Ambiente (in Spanish). 4 (1): 137–146. doi:10.48204/rea.v4n1.7301.
- Wolf, Stacy; Bullard, Robert; Buonocore, Jonathan J.; Donley, Nisha; Farrelly, Travis; Fleming, Jackson; González, Daniel J.; Oreskes, Naomi; Ripple, William J.; Saha, Rajnish; Willis, Matthew D. (2025). "Scientists' warning on fossil fuels". Oxford Open Climate Change. 5 (1) kgaf011. doi:10.1093/oxfclm/kgaf011.
- Garcia-Gonzalez, F.; Ripple, W.J.; Malo, A.F. (2024). "Scientists' warning to humanity for long-term planetary thinking on biodiversity and humankind preservation, a cosmic perspective". BioScience. 74 (2): 82–85. doi:10.1093/biosci/biac002. PMC 10880066. PMID 38390310.
- Hajdukovic, D.; Hajdukovic, I.; Hajdukovic, A.M. (2024). "Scientists' Warning on the decision-making system and production in a sustainable society". SSRN. doi:10.2139/ssrn.4851691.
- Pereira, C.C.; Kenedy-Siqueira, W.; Negreiros, D.; Fernandes, S.; Barbosa, M.; Goulart, F.F.; Athayde, S.; Wolf, C.; Harrison, I.J.; Betts, M.G.; Powers, J.S. (2024). "Scientists' warning: six key points where biodiversity can improve climate change mitigation". BioScience. 74 (5): 315–318. doi:10.1093/biosci/biad020.
- Sarmiento Galán, A.; Pérez Tamayo, L. (2024). "Scientists Warning that Nationalism or Militarism Ideologies Block the Urgently Needed Planetary Consciousness" (PDF). International Journal of Arts and Social Science. 7 (5): 283–290.
- Arora, R.; Kaur, J. (2023). "Scientists' warning on loss of insect biodiversity and implications for sustainable agriculture". Insect Environment. 26 (2): 161–167. doi:10.55278/TELS2532.
- Greguš, J.; Guillebaud, J. (2023). "Scientists' Warning: Remove the Barriers to Contraception Access, for Health of Women and the Planet". World. 4 (3): 589–597. doi:10.3390/world4030036.
- Harvey, Jeffrey A.; Tougeron, Kévin; Gols, Rieta; Heinen, Rudolf; Abarca, Marianela; Abram, Paul K.; Basset, Yves; Berg, Marcel; Boggs, Carol L.; Brodeur, Jacques; Cardoso, Pedro (2023). "Scientists' warning on climate change and insects". Ecological Monographs. 93 (1) e1553. Bibcode:2023EcoM...93E1553H. doi:10.1002/ecm.1553. ISSN 0012-9615.
- Lamoreux, L.; Bennett, D. (2023). "Scientists' Warning on the Problem with Over-population and Living Systems". The Journal of Population and Sustainability. 8 (1). doi:10.3197/JPS.63799953906873.
- Merz, Joseph J.; Barnard, Phoebe; Rees, William E.; Smith, Dane; Maroni, Mat; Rhodes, Christopher J.; Dederer, Julia H.; Bajaj, Nandita; Joy, Michael K.; Wiedmann, Thomas; Sutherland, Rory (2023). "World scientists' warning: The behavioural crisis driving ecological overshoot". Science Progress. 106 (3) 00368504231201372. doi:10.1177/00368504231201372. ISSN 0036-8504. PMC 10515534. PMID 37728669.
- Tomlinson, Bill; Torrance, Andrew W.; Ripple, William J. (2023). "Scientists' warning on technology". Journal of Cleaner Production. 418 140074. doi:10.1016/j.jclepro.2023.140074. ISSN 0959-6526.
- Crist, Eileen; Ripple, William J.; Ehrlich, Paul R.; Rees, William E.; Wolf, Christopher (2022). "Scientists' warning on population". Science of the Total Environment. 845 157166. Bibcode:2022ScTEn.84557166C. doi:10.1016/j.scitotenv.2022.157166. ISSN 0048-9697. PMID 35803428.
- Georgian, Samuel; Hameed, Sarah; Morgan, Lance; Amon, Diva J.; Sumaila, U. Rashid; Johns, David; Ripple, William J. (2022). "Scientists' warning of an imperiled ocean". Biological Conservation. 272 109595. Bibcode:2022BCons.27209595G. doi:10.1016/j.biocon.2022.109595. S2CID 249142365.
- Knight, Jane (2022). "Scientists' warning of the impacts of climate change on mountains". PeerJ. 10 e14253. Bibcode:2022PeerJ..1014253K. doi:10.7717/peerj.14253. ISSN 2167-8359. PMC 9610668. PMID 36312749.
- Marín-Beltrán, Isabel; Demaria, Federico; Ofelio, Claudia; Serra, Luis M.; Turiel, Antonio; Ripple, William J.; Mukul, Sharif A.; Costa, Maria Clara (2022). "Scientists' warning against the society of waste". Science of the Total Environment. 811 151359. Bibcode:2022ScTEn.81151359M. doi:10.1016/j.scitotenv.2021.151359. ISSN 0048-9697. PMID 34742963.
- Rivers, Malin; Newton, Adrian C.; Oldfield, Sara (2022). "Scientists' warning to humanity on tree extinctions". Plants, People, Planet. 5 (4): 466–482. doi:10.1002/ppp3.10314. ISSN 2572-2611.
- Ripple, W.J.; Wolf, C.; Gregg, J.W.; Levin, K.; Rockström, J.; Newsome, T.M.; Betts, M.G.; Huq, S.; Law, B.E.; Kemp, L.; Kalmus, P. (2022). "World scientists' warning of a climate emergency 2022". BioScience. 72 (6): 1–??. doi:10.1093/biosci/biac058.
- Schmeller, Dirk S.; Urbach, Daniel; Bates, Kathryn; Catalan, Jordi; Cogălniceanu, Dan; Fisher, Matthew C.; Friesen, John; Füreder, Ludwig; Gaube, Veronika; Haver, Vera; Jacobsen, Dean (2022). "Scientists' warning of threats to mountains". Science of the Total Environment. 827 158611. Bibcode:2022ScTEn.85358611S. doi:10.1016/j.scitotenv.2022.158611. ISSN 0048-9697. PMID 36087665.
- Albert, James S.; Destouni, Georgia; Duke-Sylvester, Scott M.; Magurran, Anne E.; Oberdorff, Thierry; Reis, Roberto E.; Winemiller, Kirk O.; Ripple, William J. (2021). "Scientists' warning to humanity on the freshwater biodiversity crisis". Ambio. 50 (1): 85–94. Bibcode:2021Ambio..50...85A. doi:10.1007/s13280-020-01318-8. ISSN 0044-7447. PMC 7708569. PMID 32040746.
- Barnard, Phoebe; Moomaw, William R.; Fioramonti, Lorenzo; Laurance, William F.; Mahmoud, Mahmoud I.; O'Sullivan, Jane; Rapley, Christopher G.; Rees, William E.; Rhodes, Christopher J.; Ripple, William J.; Semiletov, Igor P.; Talberth, John; Tucker, Christopher; Wysham, Daphne; Ziervogel, Gina (2021). "World scientists' warnings into action, local to global". Science Progress. 104 (4) 00368504211056290: 1–32. doi:10.1177/00368504211056290. ISSN 0036-8504. PMC 10450599. PMID 34763547.
- Cardoso, Pedro; Amponsah-Mensah, Kofi; Barreiros, João P.; Bouhuys, Jamie; Cheung, Hubert; Davies, Alisa; Kumschick, Sabrina; Longhorn, Stuart J.; Martínez-Muñoz, Carlos A.; Morcatty, Thais Q.; Peters, Gretchen; Ripple, William J.; Rivera-Téllez, Emmanuel; Stringham, Oliver C.; Toomes, Adam; Tricorache, Patricia; Fukushima, Caroline S. (2021). "Scientists' warning to humanity on illegal or unsustainable wildlife trade". Biological Conservation. 263 109341. Bibcode:2021BCons.26309341C. doi:10.1016/j.biocon.2021.109341. ISSN 0006-3207.
- Fernández-Llamazares, Álvaro; Lepofsky, Dana; Lertzman, Ken; Armstrong, Chelsey Geralda; Brondizio, Eduardo S.; Gavin, Michael C.; Lyver, Phil O’B.; Nicholas, George P.; Pascua, Pua’ala; Reo, Nicholas J.; Reyes-García, Victoria; Turner, Nancy J.; Yletyinen, Johanna; Anderson, E. N.; Balée, William; Cariño, Joji; David-Chavez, Dominique M.; Dunn, Christopher P.; Garnett, Stephen C.; Greening, Spencer (La’goot); Jackson, Shain (Niniwum Selapem); Kuhnlein, Harriet; Molnár, Zsolt; Odonne, Guillaume; Retter, Gunn-Britt; Ripple, William J.; Sáfián, László; Sharifian Bahraman, Abolfazl; Torrents-Ticó, Miquel; Vaughan, Mehana Blaich (2021). "Scientists' Warning to Humanity on Threats to Indigenous and Local Knowledge Systems". Journal of Ethnobiology. 41 (2): 144–169. doi:10.2993/0278-0771-41.2.144. ISSN 0278-0771.
- Fernández-Palacios, José M.; Kreft, Holger; Irl, Severin D. H.; Norder, Sietze; Ah-Peng, Claudine; Borges, Paulo A. V.; Burns, Kevin C.; de Nascimento, Lea; Meyer, Jean-Yves; Montes, Elba; Drake, Donald R. (2021). "Scientists' warning – The outstanding biodiversity of islands is in peril". Global Ecology and Conservation. 31 e01847. Bibcode:2021GEcoC..3101847F. doi:10.1016/j.gecco.2021.e01847. ISSN 2351-9894. PMC 8556160. PMID 34761079.
- Haswell, P.M. (2021). "Scientist Warning on Why you Should Consume Less; Even if Wider Society Doesn't". Nature and Culture. 16 (3): 29–48. Bibcode:2021NatCu..16...29H. doi:10.3167/nc.2021.160302.
- Leverkus, Alexandro B.; Thorn, Simon; Gustafsson, Lena; Noss, Reed F.; Müller, Jörg; Pausas, Juli-G.; Lindenmayer, David B. (2021). "Environmental policies to cope with novel disturbance regimes – steps to address a world scientists' warning to humanity". Environmental Research Letters. 16 (2): 021003. Bibcode:2021ERL....16b1003L. doi:10.1088/1748-9326/abdc5a. ISSN 1748-9326.
- Madliger, Christine L.; Franklin, C. E.; Chown, Steven L.; Fuller, Adrienne; Hultine, Kristin R.; Costantini, Donato; Hopkins, William A.; Peck, Mark A.; Rummer, Justin L.; Sack, Lawrence; Willis, Charles K. R.; Cooke, Steven J. (2021). "The second warning to humanity: contributions and solutions from conservation physiology". Conservation Physiology. 9 (1) coab038. doi:10.1093/conphys/coab038. ISSN 2051-1434.
- Reid, A.; Dillon, J.; Ardoin, N.; Ferreira, J.A. (2021). "Scientists' warnings and the need to reimagine, recreate, and restore environmental education". Environmental Education Research. 27 (6): 783–795. doi:10.1080/13504622.2021.1937535 (inactive 12 August 2026).
- Ripple, William J.; Wolf, Christopher; Newsome, Thomas M.; Gregg, Jillian W.; Lenton, Timothy M.; Palomo, Ignacio; Eikelboom, Jasper A. J.; Law, Beverly E.; Huq, Saleemul; Duffy, Philip B.; Rockström, Johan (2021). "World scientists' warning of a climate emergency 2021". BioScience. 71 (9): 894–898. doi:10.1093/biosci/biab079. ISSN 0006-3568.
- Robinne, François-Nicolas; Hallema, Dennis W.; Bladon, Kevin D.; Flannigan, Michael D.; Boisramé, Gabrielle; Bréthaut, Christophe M.; Doerr, Stefan H.; Di Baldassarre, Giuliano; Gallagher, Lauren A.; Hohner, Alexander K.; Khan, Saeed J. (2021). "Scientists' warning on extreme wildfire risks to water supply". Hydrological Processes. 35 (5) e14086. Bibcode:2021HyPr...35E4086R. doi:10.1002/hyp.14086. ISSN 0885-6087. PMC 8251805. PMID 34248273.
- Applequist, Wendy L.; Brinckmann, Josef A.; Cunningham, Anthony B.; Hart, Robbie E.; Heinrich, Michael; Katerere, David R.; van Andel, Tinde (2020). "Scientists' Warning on Climate Change and Medicinal Plants". Planta Medica. 86 (1): 10–18. Bibcode:2020PlMed..86...10A. doi:10.1055/a-1041-3406. ISSN 0032-0943. PMID 31731314.
- Cardoso, Pedro; Barton, Philip S.; Birkhofer, Klaus; Chichorro, Filipe; Deacon, Charl; Fartmann, Thomas; Fukushima, Caroline S.; Gaigher, René; Habel, Jan C.; Hallmann, Caspar A.; Hill, Matthew J.; Hochkirch, Axel; Kwak, Mackenzie L.; Mammola, Stefano; Noriega, Jorge A.; Orfinger, Alexander B.; Pedraza, Fernando; Pryke, James S.; Roque, Fabio O.; Settele, Josef; Simaika, John P.; Stork, Nigel E.; Suhling, Frank; Vorster, Carlien; Samways, Michael J. (2020). "Scientists' warning to humanity on insect extinctions". Biological Conservation. 242 108426. Bibcode:2020BCons.24208426C. doi:10.1016/j.biocon.2020.108426. ISSN 0006-3207.
- Greguš, Jan; Guillebaud, John (2020). "Doctors and overpopulation 48 years later: a second notice". The European Journal of Contraception & Reproductive Health Care. 25 (6): 409–416. doi:10.1080/13625187.2020.1821356. PMID 33044097.
- Heleno, Rui H.; Ripple, William J.; Traveset, Anna (2020). "Scientists' warning on endangered food webs". Web Ecology. 20 (1): 1–10. Bibcode:2020WEco...20....1H. doi:10.5194/we-20-1-2020.
- Jenny, Jean-Philippe; Anneville, Orlane; Arnaud, Fabien; Baulaz, Yoann; Bouffard, Damien; Domaizon, Isabelle; Bocaniov, Serghei A.; Chèvre, Nathalie; Dittrich, Maria; Dorioz, Jean-Marcel; Dunlop, Erin S.; Dur, Gaël; Guillard, Jean; Guinaldo, Thibault; Jacquet, Stéphan; Jamoneau, Aurélien; Jawed, Zobia; Jeppesen, Erik; Krantzberg, Gail; Lenters, John; Leoni, Barbara; Meybeck, Michel; Nava, Veronica; Nõges, Tiina; Nõges, Peeter; Patelli, Martina; Pebbles, Victoria; Perga, Marie-Elodie; Rasconi, Serena; Ruetz, Carl R.; Rudstam, Lars; Salmaso, Nico; Sapna, Sharma; Straile, Dietmar; Tammeorg, Olga; Twiss, Michael R.; Uzarski, Donald G.; Ventelä, Anne-Mari; Vincent, Warwick F.; Wilhelm, Steven W.; Wängberg, Sten Åke; Weyhenmeyer, Gesa A. (2020). "Scientists' Warning to Humanity: Rapid degradation of the world's large lakes". Journal of Great Lakes Research. 46 (4): 686–702. Bibcode:2020JGLR...46..686J. doi:10.1016/j.jglr.2020.05.006. ISSN 0380-1330.
- Kopnina, H.; Washington, H.; Lowe, I.; Irvine, S. (2020). "Scientists' warning to humanity: Strategic thinking on economic development, population, poverty and ecological sustainability in the Mediterranean and beyond". Euro-Mediterranean Journal for Environmental Integration. 5: 1–15. doi:10.1007/s41207-020-00157-y (inactive 12 August 2026).
- Lidicker Jr., William J. (2020). "A Scientist's Warning to humanity on human population growth". Global Ecology and Conservation. 24 e01232. Bibcode:2020GEcoC..2401232L. doi:10.1016/j.gecco.2020.e01232. PMC 7422788. PMID 32837974.
- Pyšek, Petr; Hulme, Philip E.; Simberloff, Dan; Bacher, Sven; Blackburn, Tim M.; Carlton, James T.; Dawson, Wayne; Essl, Franz; Foxcroft, Llewellyn C.; Genovesi, Piero; Jeschke, Jonathan M.; Kühn, Ingolf; Liebhold, Andrew M.; Mandrak, Nicholas E.; Meyerson, Laura A.; Pauchard, Aníbal; Pergl, Jan; Roy, Helen E.; Seebens, Hanno; van Kleunen, Mark; Vilà, Montserrat; Wingfield, Michael J.; Richardson, David M. (2020). "Scientists' warning on invasive alien species". Biological Reviews. 95 (6): 1511–1534. doi:10.1111/brv.12627. ISSN 1464-7931. PMC 7687187. PMID 32588508.
- Samways, Michael J.; Barton, Philip S.; Birkhofer, Klaus; Chichorro, Filipe; Deacon, Charl; Fartmann, Thomas; Fukushima, Caroline S.; Gaigher, René; Habel, Jan C.; Hallmann, Caspar A.; Hill, Matthew J.; Hochkirch, Axel; Kaila, Lauri; Kwak, Mackenzie L.; Maes, Dirk; Mammola, Stefano; Noriega, Jorge A.; Orfinger, Alexander B.; Pedraza, Fernando; Pryke, James S.; Roque, Fabio O.; Settele, Josef; Simaika, John P.; Stork, Nigel E.; Suhling, Frank; Vorster, Carlien; Cardoso, Pedro (2020). "Solutions for humanity on how to conserve insects". Biological Conservation. 242 108427: 1–15. Bibcode:2020BCons.24208427S. doi:10.1016/j.biocon.2020.108427. ISSN 0006-3207.
- Washington, H.; Lowe, I.; Kopnina, H. (2020). "Why Do Society and Academia Ignore the 'Scientists Warning to Humanity' On Population?". Journal of Futures Studies. 25 (1): 93–106. doi:10.6531/JFS.202009_25(1).0009.
- Wiedmann, Thomas; Lenzen, Manfred; Keyßer, Lorenz T.; Steinberger, Julia K. (2020). "Scientists' warning on affluence". Nature Communications. 11 (1) 3107. Bibcode:2020NatCo..11.3107W. doi:10.1038/s41467-020-16941-y. PMC 7305220. PMID 32561753.
- Harwatt, H.; Ripple, W.J.; Chaudhary, A.; Betts, M.G.; Hayek, M.N. (2019). "Scientists call for renewed Paris pledges to transform agriculture". The Lancet Planetary Health. 4 (1): e9–e10. doi:10.1016/S2542-5196(19)30245-1. PMID 31838020.
- Mammola, Stefano; Cardoso, Pedro; Culver, David C.; Deharveng, Louis; Ferreira, Rodrigo L.; Fišer, Cene; Galassi, Diana M. P.; Griebler, Christian; Halse, Stuart; Humphreys, William F.; Isaia, Marco; Malard, Florian; Martinez, Alejandro; Moldovan, Oana T.; Niemiller, Matthew L.; Pavlek, Martina; Reboleira, Ana Sofia P. S.; Souza-Silva, Marconi; Teeling, Emma C.; Wynne, J. Judson; Zagmajster, Maja (2019). "Scientists' Warning on the Conservation of Subterranean Ecosystems". BioScience. 69 (8): 641–650. doi:10.1093/biosci/biz064. ISSN 0006-3568.

== See also ==
- Climate emergency declaration
- Individual action on climate change
- List of open letters by academics

Issues

- Animal–industrial complex
- List of global issues
- Anthropocene
- Climate crisis
- Defaunation
- Effects of global warming
- Habitat loss
- Habitat protection
- Holocene extinction
- Human impact on the environment
- Human overpopulation
- Sustainable food system

Groups

- Extinction Rebellion
- Scientists for Future
- Scientists for Extinction Rebellion
