= Overshoot (population) =

Phenomenon in which populations temporarily exceed carrying capacity of environment

External videos
- How Earth's Population Exploded -Bloomberg Quicktake

In environmental science, a population overshoots its local carrying capacity—the maximum population size that an ecosystem can sustainably support—when it exceeds the availability of resources needed for survival. This can lead to a population crash if resources are depleted faster than they can regenerate. Overshoot applies to humans as well as other animal populations: any species that relies on consumption of resources to survive.

Environmental science studies to what extent human populations through their resource consumption have risen above the sustainable use of resources. For people, "overshoot" is that portion of their demand or ecological footprint which must be eliminated to be sustainable, or the delta between a sustainable population and what we currently have. Excessive demand leading to overshoot is driven by both consumption and population.

Population decline due to overshoot is known as 'collapse'. The path taken by such a population is referred to as 'overshoot-and-collapse'. Collapse, like overshoot, can occur due to various factors, with the Malthusian catastrophe being a specific but not identical case.

Overshoot can happen as a result of delayed impacts, where reproduction rates persistently surpass the death rate. This can lead to significant consequences, with entire ecosystems being profoundly impacted and sometimes simplified due to prolonged overshoot. An instance of this phenomenon took place in the Horn of Africa when smallpox was eradicated, causing a sudden increase in the population that exceeded the region's carrying capacity. For centuries, the land had sustained approximately 1 million pastoralists, but with the elimination of the disease, the population suddenly grew to 14 million people. Consequently, overgrazing occurred, leading to soil erosion.

The most famous example of an overshoot-and-crash may be from St. Matthew Island. In 1944, 29 reindeer were introduced to the island, which by 1963 had grown to a peak population of roughly 6000 individuals — well past the estimated carrying capacity. At next count, in 1965, the population had plummeted and only 42 reindeer were left alive.

Thomas Malthus (1766-1864) is perhaps the most well-known writer to have articulated the roots of the modern concept of human overshoot, with The Population Bomb (1967) by Paul Ehrlich reigniting the hotly-debated topic in more recent history. Daniel Quinn claims to have modernized the concept of human overpopulation in what are likely the most well-read volumes to have given it extensive treatment as a subject of ecology: The Story of B (1996) and My Ishmael (1997).

== Human overshoot ==
The 1972 book The Limits to Growth discussed the limits to growth of society as a whole. This book included a computer-based model which predicted that the Earth would reach a carrying capacity of ten to fourteen billion people after some two hundred years, after which the human population would collapse. The model was based on five variables: "population, food production, industrialization, pollution, and consumption of non-renewable natural resources". This simulation modelled human populations after the overshoot and collapse seen in all unmoderated species. It was controversial and generally dismissed by economists.

Sociologist William R. Catton, Jr. explored the connections between human societies and the natural environment in his book Overshoot published in 1980. Catton expressed his concerns about the global population exceeding Earth's sustainable limits, advocating that a reduction in population through natural means, such as mortality, was necessary. He argued that the predicament stemmed from both overpopulation, where the number of people surpassed what the planet could support, and overconsumption, referring to the excessive utilization of resources. Catton predicted that unless these issues were addressed, humanity would surpass the Earth's optimal carrying capacity, leading to potentially dire consequences.

The Global Footprint Network purports to be able to measure how much the human economy demands against what the Earth can renew. The Optimum Population Trust (now called Population Matters) has listed what they believe is the overshoot (overpopulation) of a number of countries, based on the above.

In one study published in January 2021 in Frontiers in Conservation Science, the significance of overshoot is discussed. It says that alongside the growth of the global population, humanity's consumption relative to Earth's regenerative capacity has surged by 73% in 1960 to 170% in 2016, particularly in countries with higher incomes. These findings are based on recent ecological footprint studies.

An article in Frontiers in Conservation Science also says ecological overshoot has been facilitated by the increasing reliance on fossil fuels. The widespread use of convenient energy sources has allowed human demand to detach from the limits of biological regeneration. Notably, fossil fuels account for 85% of commercial energy production, 65% of fiber production, and serve as the primary raw material for most plastics.

As a possible cause for societal collapse, overshoot has been scholarly discussed, but has not been found having been the cause for historic cases of collapse.

=== Predictions of scarcity ===
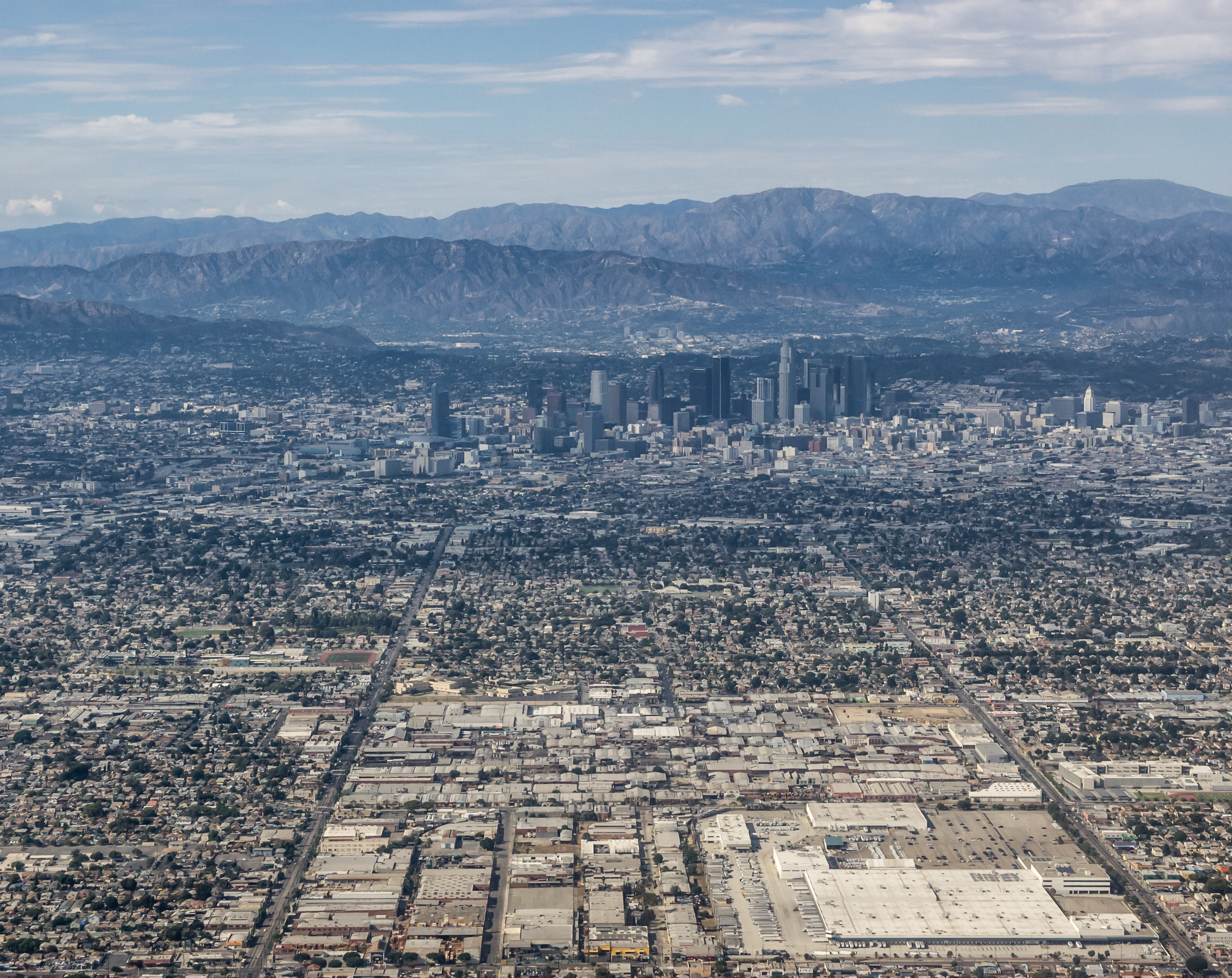
Greater Los Angeles lies on a coastal mediterranean savannah with a small watershed that is able to support at most one million people on its own water; as of 2015, the area has a population of over 18 million. Researchers predict that similar cases of resource scarcity will grow more common as the world population increases.

British scholar Thomas Malthus, in his seminal work published in 1798 titled An Essay on the Principle of Population, forecast the potential depletion of the world's food resources due to the growth of human population. Malthus composed this essay with the intention of refuting the impractical utopian concepts advocated by William Godwin and Marquis de Condorcet in their respective works, namely Political Justice and The Future Progress of the Human Mind. In 1968, Paul R. Ehrlich revived Malthus' argument in his book The Population Bomb, wherein he anticipated an impending global famine of catastrophic proportions.

The predictions of Ehrlich and other neo-Malthusians were challenged by a number of economists, notably Julian Lincoln Simon, who said advances in agriculture, collectively known as the Green Revolution, forestalled any potential global famine in the late 20th century. Notably, between 1950 and 1984, the Green Revolution transformed agriculture around the world and grain production increased by over 250%. The world population has grown by over four billion since the beginning of the Green Revolution, but food production has so far kept pace with population growth. Most scholars believe that, without the Green Revolution, there would be greater levels of famine and malnutrition than the UN presently documents. However, neo-Malthusians point out that fossil fuels provided the energy for the Green Revolution, in the form of natural gas-derived fertilizers, oil-derived pesticides, and hydrocarbon-fueled irrigation, and that many crops have become so genetically uniform that a crop failure in any one country could potentially have global repercussions.

In May 2008, the price of grain rose because of the increased cultivation of biofuels, the increase of world oil prices to over $140 per barrel ($880/m^{3}), global population growth, the effects of climate change, the loss of agricultural land to residential and industrial development, and growing consumer demand in the population centres of China and India. Food riots subsequently occurred in some countries. However, oil prices then fell sharply. Resource demands are expected to ease as population growth declines, but it is unclear whether mass food wastage and rising living standards in developing countries will once again create resource shortages.

David Pimentel, professor of ecology and agriculture at Cornell University, estimates that the sustainable agricultural carrying capacity for the United States is about 200 million people; its population as of 2015 is over 300 million. In 2009, the UK government's chief scientific advisor, Professor John Beddington, warned that growing populations, falling energy reserves and food shortages would create a "perfect storm" of shortages of food, water, and energy by 2030. According to a 2009 report by the United Nations Food and Agriculture Organization (FAO), the world will have to produce 70% more food by 2050 to feed a projected extra 2.3 billion people.

The figures for 2007 showed an actual increase in absolute numbers of undernourished people in the world, with 923 million undernourished in 2007, versus 832 million in 1995. The 2009 FAO estimates showed an even more dramatic increase, to 1.02 billion.

=== Human impact on the environment ===
The inward spiral shows how humans have progressively used more of Earth's resources than the planet can regenerate. Earth's ability to regenerate consumed resources now lasts only about 57% as long as in 1971.

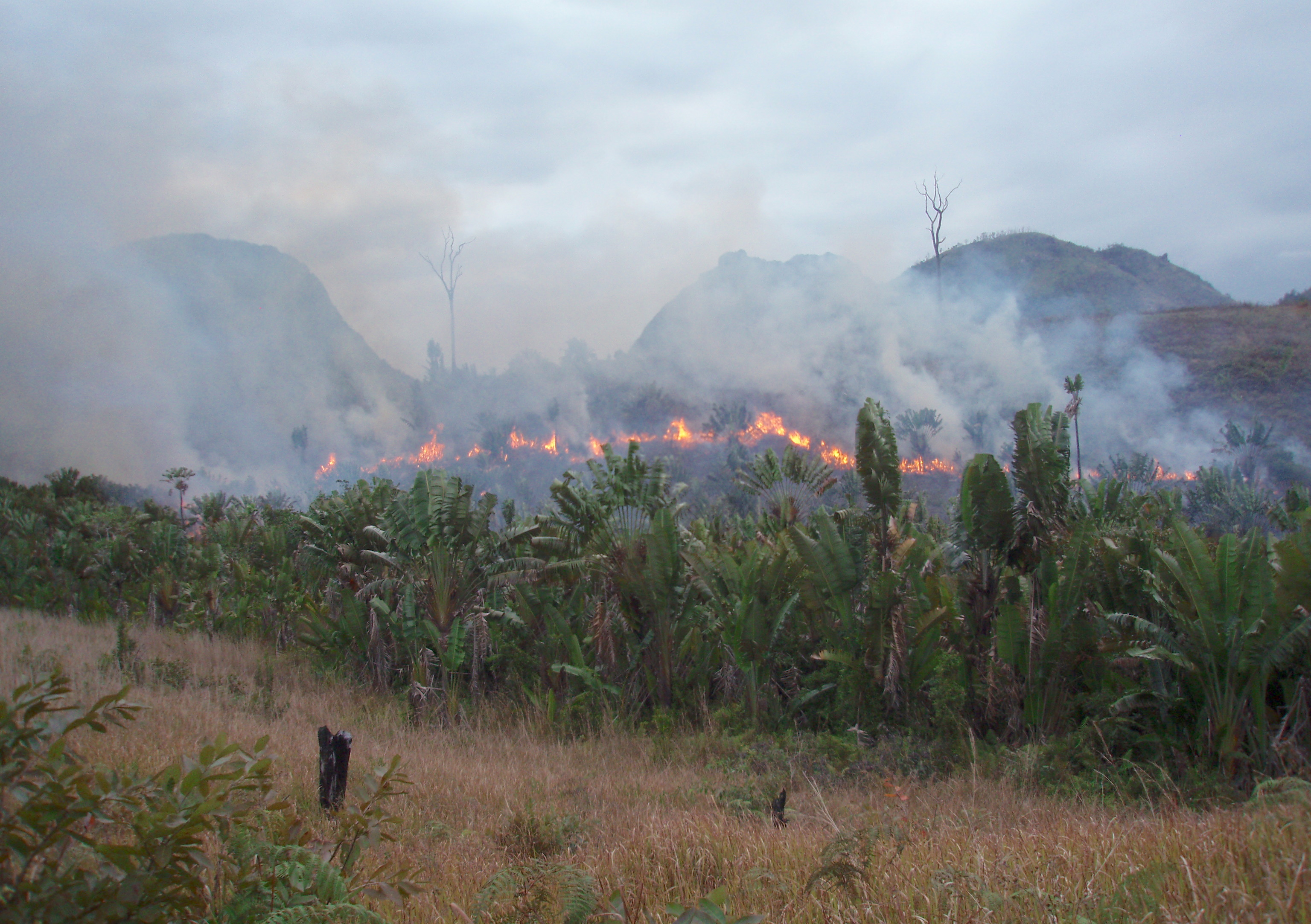
Illegal slash-and-burn agriculture in Madagascar, 2010

A number of scientists have argued that the looming human impact on the environment and accompanying increase in resource consumption threatens the world's ecosystem and the survival of human civilization. Scientists contend that continued human population growth and overconsumption, particularly by the wealthy, are the primary drivers of mass species extinction and some suggesting human overpopulation as a driver.

=== Human population planning ===
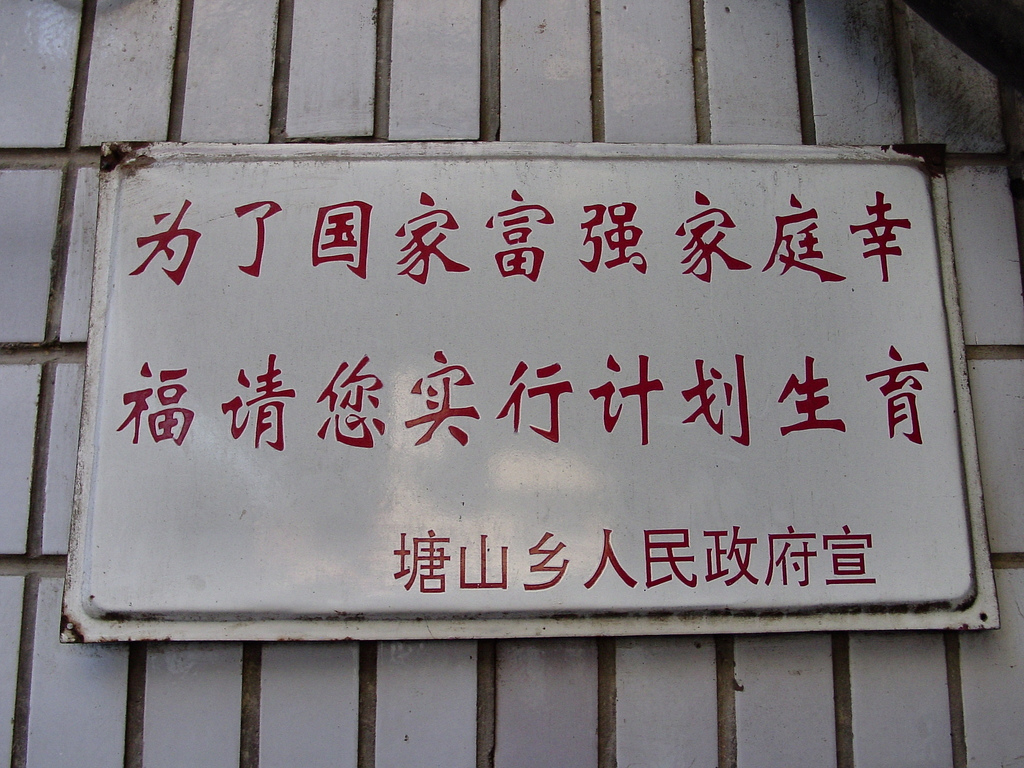
A government sign in China: "For a prosperous, powerful nation and a happy family, please practice family planning."

Human population planning is the practice of intervening to alter the rate of population growth. Historically, human population control has been implemented by limiting a region's birth rate, by voluntary contraception or by government mandate. It has been undertaken as a response to factors including high or increasing levels of poverty, environmental concerns, and religious reasons. The use of abortion in some population control strategies has caused controversy, with religious organizations such as the Roman Catholic Church explicitly opposing any intervention in the human reproductive process.

The University of Nebraska–Lincoln publication Green Illusions argues that population control to alleviate environmental pressures need not be coercive. It states that "Women who are educated, economically engaged, and in control of their own bodies can enjoy the freedom of bearing children at their own pace, which happens to be a rate that is appropriate for the aggregate ecological endowment of our planet." The book Fatal Misconception by Matthew Connelly similarly points to the importance of supporting the rights of women in bringing population levels down over time. Paul Ehrlich also advocates making "modern contraception and back-up abortion available to all and give women full equal rights, pay and opportunities with men," noting that it could possibly "lead to a low enough total fertility rate that the needed shrinkage of population would follow. [But] it will take a very long time to humanely reduce total population to a size that is sustainable." Ehrlich places the optimum global population size at 1.5 to 2 billion people. A 2026 study published in Sustainable Development said that gradually reducing the human population to 4 billion by 2200 is a path towards sustainability which will help decrease overconsumption of resources, biodiversity loss, pollution levels and greenhouse gas emissions.

Other academicians and public figures have pointed to the role of agriculture and agricultural productivity of increasing human carrying capacity, which results in population overshoot, as with any other species when their food supply experiences an increase, which in turn results in resource depletion and mass poverty and starvation in the case of humans.

== See also ==
- Anthropocene – Proposed geologic epoch
- Biocapacity – Estimate of an ecosystem's production of certain biological materials
- Carrying capacity – Maximum population size of a species that an ecosystem can support
- Earth Overshoot Day – Calculated calendar date when humanity's yearly consumption exceeds Earth's replenishment
- Ecological footprint – Individual's or a group's human demand on nature
- Ecological overshoot – Demands on ecosystem exceeding regeneration
- History of Easter Island
- Malthusianism – Idea about population growth and food supply
- Overconsumption – Resource use exceeding carrying capacity
- Overpopulation – When a population of a species exceeds the carrying capacity of its environment
- Paradox of enrichment – Paradox coined by Michael Rosenzweig
- Planetary boundaries – Limits to safe impact on the Earth ecology
- Planetary management – Intentional global-scale management of Earth's ecosystem
