= Marta Irene Litter =

Latin American chemist

- Born: August 3, 1946 (age 80)
- Education: Buenos Aires University
- Scientific career
- Workplaces: University of Arizona; CONICET
- Thesis: Benzoilación de aldonamidas y aldonolactonas : Reacciones de eliminación-Beta y de alcohólisis de O-Benzoil-aldonolactonas (1974)

Marta Irene Litter (born 3 August 1946) is Latin American chemist who is a professor at National University of General San Martín and the CONICET of Argentina. She is a member of The World Academy of Sciences and the Latin American Academy of Sciences.

== Early life and education ==
Litter was an undergraduate and graduate student in Buenos Aires. She moved to the University of Arizona as a postdoctoral researcher in 1983.

== Research and career ==
Litter studies the presence and transformation of chemical species in environmental matrices, such as water, air and soil. These include the presence of arsenic in waters in Latin America, which is known to cause damage to human health. It is estimated that over 14 million people in Latin America are at risk of high concentrations of arsenic, which can give rise to skin disorders. She makes use of thermal and photochemical analytical and removal techniques. She has concentrated her research on the development of heterogenous photocalaysis. These catalysts can be used to convert ionic species to metallic solids, which allows them to be deposited across the surface of a semiconductor and permits them to be converted into a less toxic form. Three distinct mechanisms can be involved with the photocatalytic removal of metal ions from water, the reduction of photogenerated electrons, indirect reduction by intermediates and oxidative removal.

Litter was appointed to The World Academy of Sciences in 2019 and the Latin American Academy of Sciences in 2020. In 2021, Litter was made the inaugural 'Academic Leader' award winner of the Latin American Women in Chemistry Awards. Later that year she was awarded the Eduardo Charreau Award. In 2023 she was granted the Platinum Konex Award as the most important chemist in Argentina.

== Selected publications ==
- Litter, M (1999-11-01). "Heterogeneous photocatalysis Transition metal ions in photocatalytic systems". Applied Catalysis B: Environmental. 23 (2–3): 89–114. Bibcode:1999AppCB..23...89L. doi:10.1016/s0926-3373(99)00069-7. ISSN 0926-3373.
- Litter, M.I.; Navío, J.A. (1996). "Photocatalytic properties of iron-doped titania semiconductors". Journal of Photochemistry and Photobiology A: Chemistry. 98 (3): 171–181. Bibcode:1996JPPA...98..171L. doi:10.1016/1010-6030(96)04343-2. ISSN 1010-6030.
- Jochen Bundschuh; Marta I Litter; Faruque Parvez; et al. (29 September 2011). "One century of arsenic exposure in Latin America: a review of history and occurrence from 14 countries". Science of the Total Environment. 429: 2–35. doi:10.1016/j.scitotenv.2011.06.024. ISSN 0048-9697. PMID 21959248. Wikidata Q37940778.
