= Roger Martin (diplomat) =

British diplomat (born 1941)

Roger J.A. Martin
- Born: 21 January 1941 (age 85)
- Spouse: Ann Cornwell (d 2009)
- Children: 1

Roger Martin is chair to the Board of Trustees, Population Matters (formerly the Optimum Population Trust) and President of the Somerset Branch, Campaign to Protect Rural England.

== Education ==
Westminster school, Brasenose College, Oxford,

== Career ==
- VSO Northern Rhodesia, 1959–60;
- Civil rights campaigner in Alabama, 1963;
- Founder member of Campaign Against Racial Discrimination;
- Commonwealth Office, 1964–66;
- Second Secretary, Djakarta, 1967; Saigon,1968–70;
- First Secretary, Foreign and Commonwealth Office, 1971–74;
- Geneva, 1975–79;
- Seconded to Department of Trade, as Head of Middle East/North Africa Branch,
- Deputy High Commissioner, Harare, 1983–86, resigned in fury;
- Author 'The Price of Apartheid' (Pub EIU 1988);
- Visiting Fellow University of Bath
- Member of National Executive, VSO, 1988–96;
- Director, Somerset Wildlife Trust, 1988-2001 Vice President from 2001,
- Member, Flood Defence and Pollution Committees, Environment Agency, 1990–2012;
- SW panel, Ministry of Agriculture, Fisheries and Food, 1993–97;
- SW Committee, Heritage Lottery Fund, 2001–06.
- Founder member, South West Regional Assembly, 1998.
- Exmoor National Park Authority: Member,1998-2008; Trustee, 2003–07.
- SW Regional Chair, Campaign to Protect Rural England 2001–2006; national Trustee 2003–07; President Somerset Branch 2006-
- President, Mendip Society, 2001-09

== HARDtalk ==
On 13 December 2010, he appeared on the BBC News programme "HARDtalk" to discuss his Trust's stance.

... of course we have to change consumption habits, we have to address technology, we have to get used to a steady-state economy with reduced levels of consumption, radically reduced for all us rich countries, we've got to do these things, they're very hard, but we've also got to stabilise our numbers – if we don't, all these other policies are ultimately going to fail to produce a sustainable world.

== Honours ==
He was made an Honorary Doctor of Science (Hon.DSc) by the University of the West of England in 2001.
