= Fatal Misconception =

2008 book by Matthew Connelly

- Author: Matthew Connelly
- Language: English
- Subjects: Demography; Human population planning Human overpopulation
- Genre: Non-fiction
- Published: 2008
- Publisher: Harvard University Press
- Publication place: United States
- ISBN: 9780674024236

Fatal Misconception: The Struggle to Control World Population is a 2008 book by Matthew Connelly, an associate professor of history at Columbia University.

Efforts to control population have been controversial, and Connelly argues that "the road to controlling population growth in the 20th century was paved with good intentions and unpleasant policies that did not work". For example, millions of intrauterine contraceptive devices were exported to poor countries although they were known to cause infections and sterility.

== Reception ==
=== Book reviews ===
Nicholas Kristof reviewed the book favorably for The New York Times, but concluded: "It's certainly fair of Connelly to dredge up the forced sterilizations, the casual disregard for injuries caused by IUDs, the racism and sexism and all the rest — but we also need to remember that all that is history. The family planning movement has corrected itself, and today it saves the lives of women in poor countries and is central to efforts to reduce poverty worldwide. If we allow that past to tarnish today's efforts by family planning organizations, women in poor countries will be doubly hurt."

Reihan Salam reviewed the book for the New York Sun, where he raised some cautionary points.

James Hughes, executive director of the Institute for Ethics and Emerging Technologies (IEET) reviewed the book for Times Higher Education. Hughes concluded: "Connelly's pessimism that international institutions can ever be as accountable as national governments is hopefully unwarranted. It seems likely that transnational bodies will be increasingly important in ensuring the health and wellbeing of the nine or ten billion people the planet will soon hold."

Helen Epstein reviewed the book favorably for the New York Review of Books, concluding: "The population control movement was a small part of US foreign policy, but its history reminds us of the point American policymakers keep missing: universal human rights are not a luxury. They are themselves the goals we should be seeking."

Diana Wyndham reviewed the book for the Australian Review of Public Affairs, concluding: "Connelly's apparent balance—he opposes both pro- and anti-population control excesses—means he is more likely to reach and convince a broader audience to accept his argument that global population control services are bad and should cease. A major worry is that this book's catalogue of failed population control programs will be used by 'Pro-life' groups who want to reinstate the 1984 Mexico City policy ban which, by denying aid, spread sexually transmitted diseases and increased pregnancy-related deaths. If, as he believes, 'the heroic age of population control is over' (p. 16), life on this planet will end because there is only a finite supply of water, food and natural resources. There is wisdom in the family planning slogan: 'Hope is not a method'."
