= David Pimentel (scientist) =

American entomologist

David Pimentel (May 24, 1925 – December 8, 2019) was an American entomologist. He was a professor of Insect Ecology & Agricultural Sciences in the Department of Entomology and Section of Ecology and Systematics at Cornell University. He made contributions in ecology, entomology, agriculture, biotechnology, conservation, and environmental policy. He was recognized as an international authority on many important interactions between humans and the environment. He published over 700 scientific items, of which 37 are books, and served on many national and government committees, including the National Academy of Sciences, the President's Science Advisory Council, the Office of Technology Assessment of the U.S. Congress, the U.S. State Department, and the Departments of Agriculture, Energy, and Health, Education and Welfare. Pimentel served on committees for many national and government organizations, including the Secretary's Commission On Pesticides And Their Relationship To Environmental Health (United States Department of Health, Education, and Welfare) which issued a report in 1969 that recommended the banning of DDT and led to the creation of the EPA.

Pimentel was an agronomist and entomologist, but he had a broad ecological perspective on agronomy, which usually is focused narrowly on yields and production. In the early 1970s he pointed out the energy intensiveness of modern agriculture. He followed that with several important papers on soil erosion. In 1999 Pimentel published estimates detailing the economic losses of invasive species. He estimated an annual economic loss of $123 billion. In most of his studies he attempted to generate quantitative estimates, even of quite difficult and large scale issues.

Pimentel calculated that the policy of growing maize to produce the ethanol, as well as other biofuels, cost more energy to maintain than it actually produced. These conclusions were met with hostility from some quarters.

== Early life and education ==
Pimentel was born on May 24, 1925, in Fresno, California and moved with his family to a farm in North Middleboro, Massachusetts. Before finishing high school, he volunteered for the Army Air Force and was trained as a pilot. He received his B.S. degree from UMASS Amherst in 1948. He received his PhD in entomology from Cornell University in 1951, also having a graduate fellowship at Oxford University that same year. After obtaining his graduate degree, he was recalled to military service, serving instead for 4 years with the US Public Health Service in Puerto Rico. He returned to Cornell in 1955, where he remained for the rest of his life, becoming the Chairman of the Entomology Department and holding a joint appointment with Ecology and Systematics.

== Scientific career ==
Pimentel began his career at Cornell studying pest control and DDT in house flies. During his time in Puerto Rico, he studied the introduced mongoose. Early work, such as on herbicides, is still cited today. At the intersection of agriculture and food security, Pimentel was concerned about the effects of chemical inputs and modern farming techniques on production in agriculture. Pimentel also warned that human overpopulation is a function of food availability. In his later years, he took an interest in the environmental effects of global warming.

In 1961, Pimentel published on several important topics in ecology, including diversity-stability, spatial patterns, and community structure. It was also the year that he presented his model integrating population dynamics and genetics that he called genetic feed-back. He later presented data for it. It was one of the earliest attempts at mathematically combining genetics with population dynamics. Half a century later, it was cited as a paper that presaged the currently hot field of eco-evolutionary dynamics.

Pimentel's forays into the environmental field came out of his experiences on various government panels and study groups, especially his year as an ecological consultant to the Office of Science and Technology. His study of the energy inputs into the productions of corn was published during the energy crisis of 1973 and became his most cited paper ever. It was followed up by a study of the energy inputs to beef production. By then, he was on his way to becoming a voice that was listened to on a variety of environmental issues through the numerous studies that he led and published, the results of which always could, and were, inspected and revised.

He was not a scientist who shied away from controversy or feared contradicting established views. Early in his career, he took on the biological control establishment by suggesting that native pests could be controlled by introducing new parasites and predators, based on his observations of successful control of pests in new associations and his genetic feedback model. It was not an idea that was readily accepted, however, particularly by California biocontrol experts. They admitted that, "Outstanding biological control successes have sometimes been achieved ... by the use of natural enemies whose hosts belong to different species or genera from the pests they are needed to control," but they then rejected (pp 47–49) Pimentel's work on genetic feedback as an explanatory mechanism involved in biocontrol by insect parasites and predators. Undaunted, Pimentel continued to support and document the use of new associations in biocontrol. This practice has been called "new association biological control" as opposed to "classical biological control".

Pimentel was a pioneer in tabulating the energy cost, fossil fuel in particular, of food production. When his suggestion that "energy was going to be important to agricultural research in the future" was rebuffed as an area of study by a 1968 National Academy of Science Panel on which he served, Pimentel set about to put together the needed data himself by creating a graduate research course to do so using his own students. Coming out during the 1973 energy crisis, the paper on energy inputs to corn production received much attention and helped to launch a number of studies and papers, including many by Pimentel and his colleagues. That paper then putatively initiated the controversy over the net energy and environmental impacts of gasohol crops. Pimentel took great solace in having had his work reviewed by "26 top scientists and engineers" who found his methods to be sound. Pimentel claimed criticism such as that raised by Bjørn Lomborg, was only a disagreement on details, rather than conclusions, stating he was correct anyway despite the fact that the numbers he used in his calculations later turned out to be wrong.

== Biomass fuels ==
Later in the 2000s a number of paper were published further criticising Pimentel's work on biomass energy. Pimentel argued that critiques of his estimates were caused by differences in how the parameters of the equation were set up, as well as the numbers used in the equation, stating that most of the numbers used for the energy use of each of the inputs (as, for example, for tractor fuel, fertilizer) were reasonably similar, although he tended to use higher numbers because he often included more parts of the supply chain in his calculations. Hence his energy cost calculations tended to be about a third higher. One agronomist wrote "why considering [sic] only the energy used to produce the cement for the processing factory, why not the energy used for the material used to produce the cement, why not the energy used to produce the material used to produce the cement, why not ...?" Accounting for the energy used to produce inputs used results in an infinite accounting sequence and hence an infinite amount of energy as input being used and, hence an infinite amount of production costs.

Nonetheless, neither the negative estimates of energetic return by Pimentel nor the positive numbers provided by Bruce Dale, showed a significantly beneficial return of investment in terms of energy costs by using biofuels to make it truly worthwhile.

== Public service ==
Governmental committees

- 1964–1966 President's Science Advisory Committee
- 1969 Secretary's Commission On Pesticides And Their Relationship To Environmental Health
- National Academy of Sciences
- U.S Department of Agriculture
- U.S. Department of Energy
- U.S. Department of Health, Education and Welfare
- Office of Technology Assessment of the U.S. Congress
- U.S. State Department

Non-governmental Committees

- Rachel Carson Council (president) - date unknown
- National Audubon Society (elected member) - date unknown
- National Geographic Society (board member) -date unknown
- American Institute of Biological Sciences (elected member) - 1999-2005

== Awards and distinctions ==
- Organic Pioneer Award (2013) from the Rodale Institute
- University of Massachusetts Graduate School Honorary Degree, 2008
- Fellow of the Entomological Society of Canada (1977)
- Fellow of the American Association for the Advancement of Science (1963)

== Bibliography ==
- David Pimentel; Hugh Lehman, eds. (1993). The Pesticide Question: Environment, Economics and Ethics.
- David Pimentel, ed. (2002). Biological Invasions: Economic and Environmental Costs of Alien Plant, Animal, and Microbe Species, Second Edition.
- David Pimentel, ed. (2007). Food, Energy, and Society 3rd Edition.
- David Pimentel, ed. (2012). Global Economic and Environmental Aspects of Biofuels (Advances in Agroecology), 1st Edition.
