= Sustainable population =

Proposed sustainable human population

Sustainable population refers to a proposed sustainable human population of Earth or a particular region of Earth, such as a nation or continent. Estimates vary widely, with estimates based on different figures ranging from 0.65 billion people to 9.8 billion, with 8 billion people being a typical estimate. Projections of population growth, evaluations of overconsumption and associated human pressures on the environment have led to some to advocate for what they consider a sustainable population. Proposed policy solutions vary, including sustainable development, female education, family planning and broad human population planning.

Emerging economies like those of China and India aspire to the living standards of the Western world, as does the non-industrialized world in general. As of 2022, China and India account for most of the population in Asia, with more than 1.4 billion each. It is the combination of population increase in the developing world and unsustainable consumption levels in the developed world that poses a stark challenge to sustainability.

According to the UN Population Fund, high fertility and poverty have been strongly correlated, and the world's poorest countries also have the highest fertility and population growth rates.

== Estimates ==
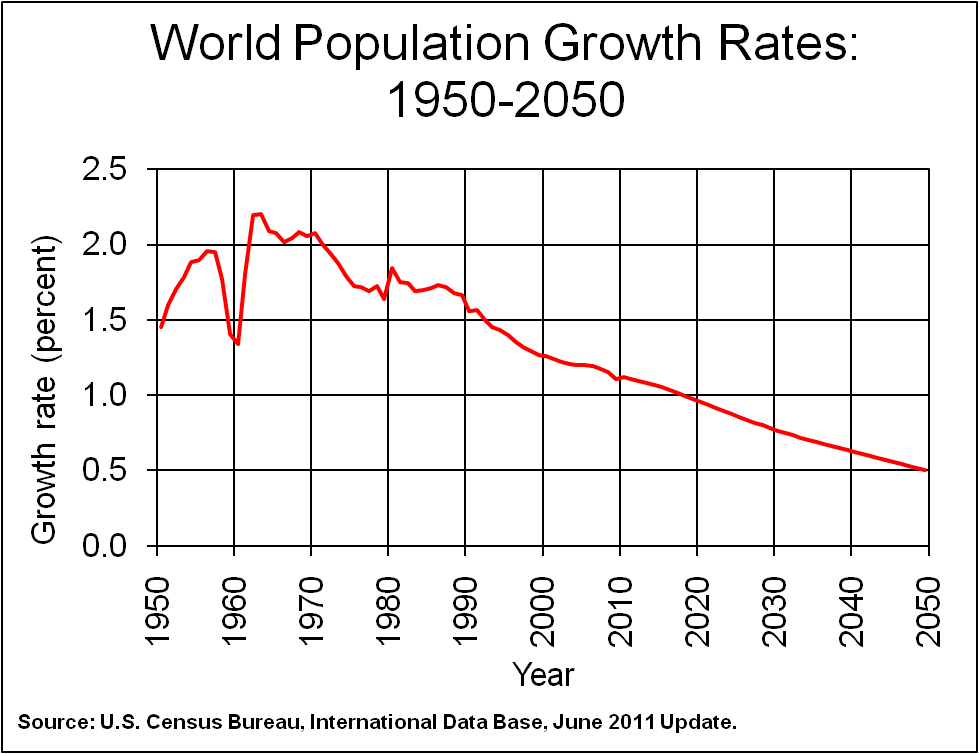
World population growth rate, 1950–2050, as estimated in 2011 by the U.S. Census Bureau, International Data Base. Although the rate of growth decreases, population continues to rise. In 2050 still growing by over 45 million per year

Map of countries and territories by fertility rate as of 2020

=== Sustainable population ===
Many studies have tried to estimate the world's sustainable population for humans, that is, the maximum population the world can host. A 2004 meta-analysis of 69 such studies from 1694 until 2001 found the average predicted maximum number of people the Earth would ever have was 7.7 billion people, with lower and upper meta-bounds at 0.65 and 9.8 billion people, respectively. They conclude: "recent predictions of stabilized world population levels for 2050 exceed several of our meta-estimates of a world population limit". A 2012 United Nations report summarized 65 different estimates of maximum sustainable population size and the most common estimate was 8 billion. While the 2012 report claims that the maximum sustainable population size and common estimate was 8 billion people, a 2024 article published that the current estimate of population in 2025 is 8 billion.

Climate change, excess nutrient loading (particularly nitrogen and phosphorus), increased ocean acidity, rapid biodiversity loss, and other global trends suggest humanity is causing global ecological degradation and threatening ecosystem services that human societies depend on. Because these environmental impacts are all directly related to human numbers, recent estimates of a sustainable human population tend to put forward much lower numbers, between 2 and 4 billion. Paul R. Ehrlich stated in 2018 that the optimum population is between 1.5 and 2 billion. Geographer Chris Tucker estimates that 3 billion is a sustainable number, provided human societies rapidly deploy less harmful technologies and best management practices. Other estimates of a sustainable global population also come in at considerably less than the current population of 8 billion. Rich countries with high usage of resources and high emissions over the years are claimed to see a decline. Whereas, low income countries with would become a focus for population growth as less natural resources such as water and food would be consumed.

A 2014 study published in the Proceedings of the National Academy of Sciences of the United States of America posits that, given the "inexorable demographic momentum of the global human population," efforts to slow population growth in the short term will have little impact on sustainability, which can be more rapidly achieved with a focus on technological and social innovations, along with reducing consumption rates, while treating population planning as a long term goal. The study says that with a fertility-reduction model of one-child per female by 2100, it would take at least 140 years to reduce the population to 2 billion people by 2153. The 2022 "Scientists' warning on population," published by Science of the Total Environment, states that "environmental analysts regard a sustainable human population as one enjoying a modest, equitable middle-class standard of living on a planet retaining its biodiversity and with climate-related adversities minimized," which is estimated at between 2 and 4 billion people.

Skeptics criticize the basic assumptions associated with these overpopulation estimates. For example, Jade Sasser believes that calculating a maximum of number of humanity which may be allowed to live while only some, mostly privileged European former colonial powers, are mostly responsible for unsustainably using up the Earth, is wrong.

But if current human numbers are not ecologically sustainable, the costs are likely to fall on the world’s poorest citizens, regardless of whether they helped cause the problem. In fact, countries that contribute the most to unsustainable production and consumption practices often have higher income per capita and slower population growth, unlike countries that have a low income per capita and rapidly growing populations.

According to a 2022 study published in Sustainable Development, a sustainable population is required for both preserving biodiversity and food security. The study says that falling fertility rates are linked to access to contraception and family planning services, and has little to no relation to economic growth. A 2026 study published in the same journal found that gradually reducing the human population to 4 billion by 2200 is a path towards sustainability which will help decrease overconsumption of resources, biodiversity loss, pollution levels and greenhouse gas emissions.

=== World population ===
According to data from 2015, the world population is projected to reach 8.5 billion by 2030, up from the current 8 billion, to exceed 9 billion people by 2050, and to reach 11.2 billion by the year 2100. Most of the increase will be in developing countries whose population is projected to rise from 5.6 billion in 2009 to 7.9 billion in 2050. This increase will be distributed among the population aged 15–59 (1.2 billion) and 60 or over (1.1 billion) because the number of children under age 15 in developing countries is predicted to decrease. In contrast, the population of the more developed regions is expected to undergo only slight increase from 1.23 billion to 1.28 billion, and this would have declined to 1.15 billion but for a projected net migration from developing to developed countries, which is expected to average 2.4 million persons annually from 2009 to 2050. Long-term estimates in 2004 of global population suggest a peak at around 2070 of nine to ten billion people, and then a slow decrease to 8.4 billion by 2100.

However, these projections assume substantial improvements in contraceptive availability throughout the developing world and large decreases in desired family size (particularly in sub-Saharan Africa), which may or may not happen. In the end, all population projections must be taken with a large pinch of salt. Particular care is needed to remember that future population size will depend on policy decisions and individual choices.

== Carrying capacity ==
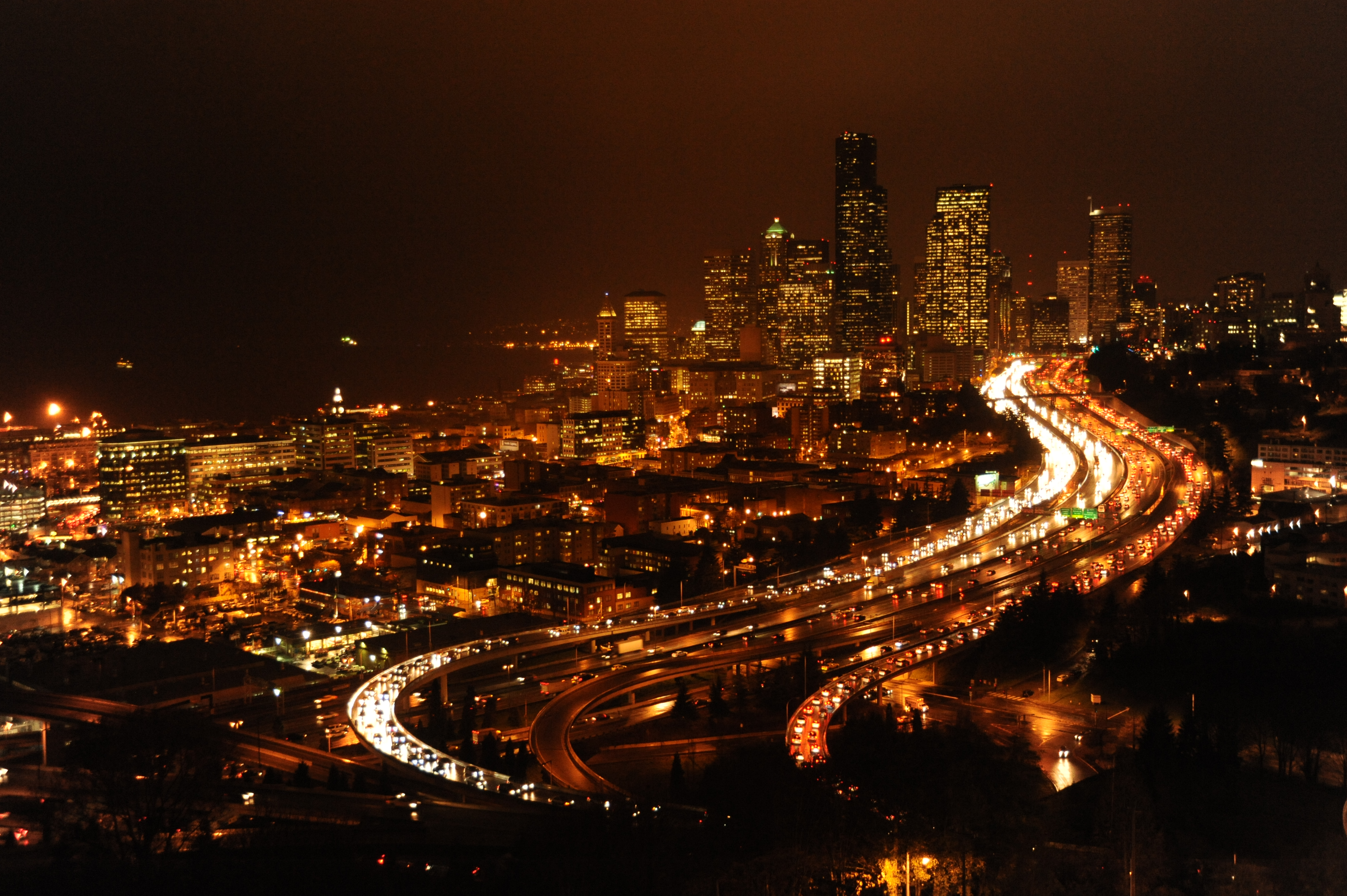
Urbanization in Seattle, Washington, United States

Talk of economic and population growth overshooting the limits of Earth's carrying capacity for humans is popular in environmentalism. The potential limiting factor for the human population might include water availability, energy availability, renewable resources, non-renewable resources, heat removal, photosynthetic capacity, or land availability for food production. Or, as current trends suggest, the limiting factors might involve ecosystems’ ability to absorb human pollution, as with climate change, ocean acidification, or the toxification of rivers and streams. The applicability of carrying capacity as a measurement of the Earth's limits in terms of the human population has been questioned, since it has proved difficult to calculate or predict the upper limits of population growth. Carrying capacity has been used as a tool in Neo-Malthusian arguments to limit population growth since the 1950s. The concept of carrying capacity has been applied to determining the population limits in Shanghai, a city faced with rapid urbanization.

The application of the concept of carrying capacity for the human population, which exists in a non-equilibrium, has been criticized for not successfully being able to model the processes between humans and the environment. In popular discourse the concept is often used vaguely in the sense of a "balance between nature and human populations".

In human ecology a popular definition from 1949 states "the maximum number of people that a given land area will maintain in perpetuity under a given system of usage without land degradation setting in". Sociologists have criticized this for numerous reasons. Aside from the fact that humans are able to adopt new customs and technology, some common critiques are 1.) an assumption an equilibrium population exists, 2.) difficulties in measuring resources, 3.) inability to account for human tastes and how much labour they will expend, 4.) assumption of full usage of resources, 5.) assumption of landscape homogeneity, 6.) assumption that regions are isolated from each other, 7.) contradicted by history, and 8.) the standard of living is ignored.

Romanian American economist Nicholas Georgescu-Roegen, a progenitor in economics and a paradigm founder of ecological economics, has argued in 1971 that the carrying capacity of Earth — that is, Earth's capacity to sustain human populations and consumption levels — is bound to decrease sometime in the future as Earth's finite stock of mineral resources is presently being extracted and put to use. Leading ecological economist and steady-state theorist Herman Daly, a student of Georgescu-Roegen, has propounded the same argument. In a series of writings, Daly has explored the connection between limiting population and achieving ecologically sustainable societies, arguing that a sustainable economy must involve limits to human numbers, since per capita human resource use can never be driven down to zero.

== See also ==
- Population ageing
- Population growth
- Human overpopulation
- Intergenerational equity
- Overshoot (population)
