= Science of the Total Environment =

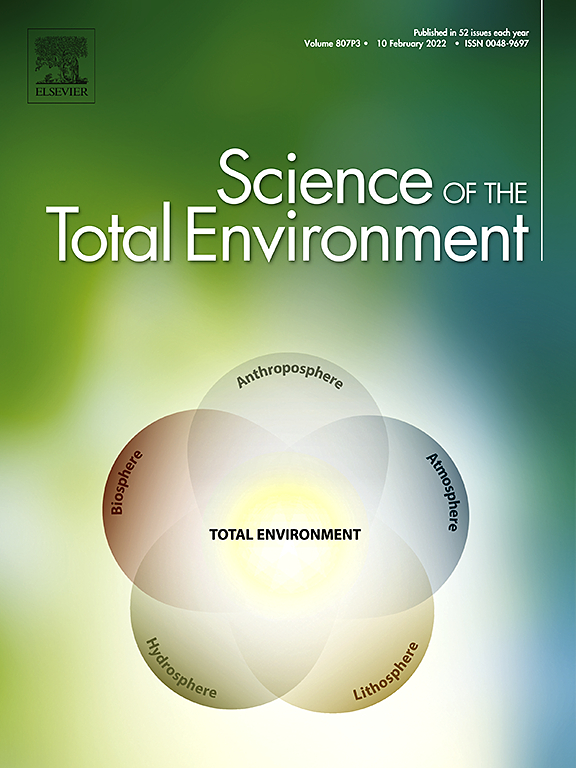
- Discipline: Environmental science
- Language: English
- Edited by: Damià Barceló, Jay Gan

Publication details
- History: 1972–present
- Publisher: Elsevier
- Frequency: Weekly
- Impact factor: Removed (2024)

Standard abbreviations
- ISO 4: Sci. Total Environ.

Indexing
- CODEN: STENDL
- ISSN: 0048-9697 (print); 1879-1026 (web)
- LCCN: 72624869
- OCLC no.: 321079391

Links
- Journal homepage; Online access

Science of the Total Environment is a weekly international peer-reviewed scientific journal covering environmental science. It was established in 1972 and is published by Elsevier. The editors-in-chief are Damià Barceló (Consejo Superior de Investigaciones Científicas), Jay Gan (University of California, Riverside) and Philip Hopke (University of Rochester).

== Controversies ==
The October 2020 article suggesting that amulets may prevent COVID-19 has been met with skepticism even among the listed coauthors. As of November 2020, the article was under "temporary removal". It was later withdrawn at the request of the authors. The editor in-chief, Damià Barceló, was implicated in a €70,000 per year scheme to publish articles under the affiliation of King Saud University, Saudi Arabia. Such schemes are employed to boost a university's rankings and are universally considered unethical by academics.

In 2025, Science of the Total Environment (STOTEN) retracted 165 papers, citing concerns including suspicious authorship changes and editorial conflicts of interest.

== Abstracting and indexing ==
The journal is abstracted and indexed in:

- BIOSIS
- CAB Abstracts
- Chemical Abstracts Core
- Ei Compendex
- Food Science and Technology Abstracts
- MEDLINE
- Scopus

According to the Journal Citation Reports, the journal has a 2024 impact factor of 8.0. As of October 2024, the journal's indexation in the Science Citation Index Expanded is "on hold" and pending re-evaluation, with Web of Science citing the concerns on "the quality of the content published in this journal" as a reason for the suspension. In November 2025, the journal was removed from the Web of Science core collection.
