= Overconsumption =

Resource use exceeding carrying capacity

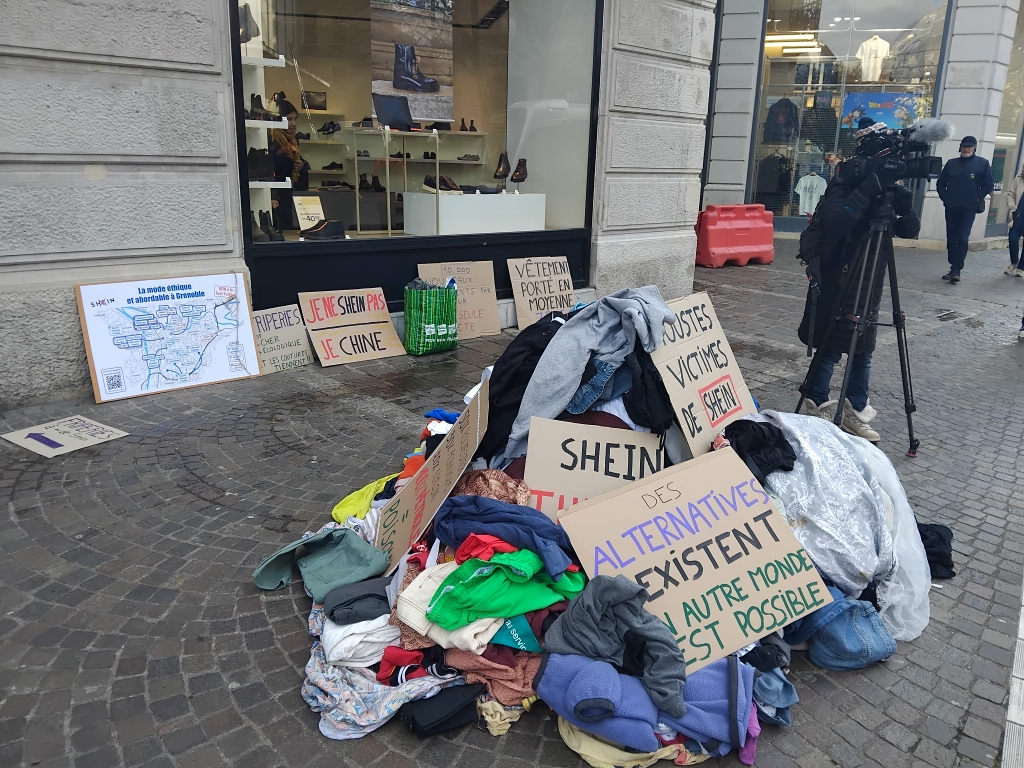
Anti-Shein protest, Grenoble, France.

Overconsumption describes a situation where consumers overuse their available goods and services to where they cannot, or do not want to, replenish or reuse them. In microeconomics, this is the point where the marginal cost of a consumer is greater than their marginal utility. The term overconsumption is quite controversial and does not necessarily have a single unifying definition. When used to refer to natural resources to the point where the environment is negatively affected, it is synonymous with the term overexploitation. However, when used in the broader economic sense, overconsumption can refer to all types of goods and services, including artificial ones, e.g., "the overconsumption of alcohol can lead to alcohol poisoning." Overconsumption is driven by several factors of the current global economy, including forces like consumerism, planned obsolescence, economic materialism, and other unsustainable business models, and can be contrasted with sustainable consumption.

Defining the amount of a natural resource required to be consumed for it to count as "overconsumption" is challenging because defining a sustainable capacity of the system requires accounting for many variables. A system's total capacity occurs at regional and worldwide levels, which means that specific regions may have higher consumption levels of certain resources than others due to greater resources without overconsuming a resource. A long-term pattern of overconsumption in any region or ecological system can cause a reduction in natural resources, often resulting in environmental degradation. However, this is only when applying the word to environmental impacts. When used in an economic sense, this point is defined as when the marginal cost of a consumer is equal to their marginal utility. Gossen's law of diminishing utility states that at this point, the consumer realizes the cost of consuming/purchasing another item/good is not worth the amount of utility (also known as happiness or satisfaction from the good) they had received, and therefore is not conducive to the consumer's wellbeing.

When used in the environmental sense, the discussion of overconsumption often parallels population size, growth, and human development: more people demanding a higher quality of living requires greater extraction of resources, which causes subsequent environmental degradation, such as climate change and biodiversity loss. Currently, the inhabitants of high-wealth, "developed" nations consume resources at a rate almost 32 times greater than those of the developing world, making up most of the human population (7.9 billion people). However, the developing world is a growing consumer market. These nations are quickly gaining more purchasing power. The Global South, which includes cities in Asia, America, and Africa, is expected to account for 56% of consumption growth by 2030, meaning that if current trends continue, relative consumption rates will shift more into these developing countries, whereas developed countries would start to plateau. Sustainable Development Goal 12, "responsible consumption and production", is the main international policy tool with goals to abate the impact of overconsumption.

== Causes ==
=== Economic growth ===
If everyone consumed resources at the US level, you will need another four or five Earths.

— Paul R. Ehrlich, biologist

Economic growth is sometimes seen as a driver for overconsumption due to a growing economy requiring compounding amounts of resource input to sustain the growth. China is an example where this phenomenon has been observed readily. China's GDP increased massively from 1978, and energy consumption has increased by 6-fold. By 1983, China's consumption surpassed the biocapacity of their natural resources, leading to overconsumption. In the last 30–40 years, China has seen significant increases in its pollution, land degradation, and non-renewable resource depletion, which aligns with its considerable economic growth. It is unknown if other rapidly developing nations will see similar trends in resource overconsumption.

The Worldwatch Institute said China and India, with their booming economies, along with the United States, are the three planetary forces that are shaping the global biosphere. The State of the World 2005 report said the two countries' high economic growth exposed the reality of severe pollution. The report states that

The world's ecological capacity is simply insufficient to satisfy the ambitions of China, India, Japan, Europe, and the United States as well as the aspirations of the rest of the world in a sustainable way.

In 2019, a warning on the climate crisis signed by 11,000 scientists from over 150 nations said economic growth is the driving force behind the "excessive extraction of materials and overexploitation of ecosystems" and that this "must be quickly curtailed to maintain long-term sustainability of the biosphere". Also in 2019, the Global Assessment Report on Biodiversity and Ecosystem Services published by the United Nations' Intergovernmental Science-Policy Platform on Biodiversity and Ecosystem Services, which found that up to one million species of plants and animals are at risk of extinction from human activity, asserted that

A key element of more sustainable future policies is the evolution of global financial and economic systems to build a global sustainable economy, steering away from the current limited paradigm of economic growth.

In addition, globalization has amplified resource overuse as developing economies serve as manufacturing hubs for wealthier nations. This results in an "outsourcing" of pollution and resource depletion, with developed countries benefiting from consumption while production-related ecological damage accumulates elsewhere.

Philip Cafaro, professor of philosophy at the School of Global Environmental Sustainability at Colorado State University, wrote in 2022 that a scientific consensus has emerged which demonstrates that humanity is on the precipice of unleashing a major extinction event, and that a major driver of this is a "rapidly growing human economy".

While often seen as a solution, technology can paradoxically contribute to increased resource use. The Jevons Paradox suggests that improvements in energy efficiency lead to greater overall consumption rather than reduced demand. For example, while China has invested heavily in renewable energy, overall energy demand continues to rise due to economic expansion, offsetting sustainability gains. Furthermore, culturally, economic growth has fostered materialism and consumerism as indicators of success, further exacerbating overconsumption. Advertising, planned obsolescence, and fast economic cycles create a continuous push for higher consumption, making it challenging to curb unsustainable resource use.

Thus, while economic growth is often seen as a marker of progress, it comes at a significant environmental cost. Without structural changes in global monetary policies, consumer behavior, and production models, overconsumption will likely continue accelerating alongside economic expansion.

=== Consumerism ===
Consumerism is a social and economic order that encourages the acquisition of goods and services in ever-increasing amounts. There is a spectrum of goods and services that the world population constantly consumes. These range from food and beverage, clothing and footwear, housing, energy, technology, transportation, education, health and personal care, financial services, and other utilities. Consumerism likewise refers to a preoccupation with purchasing goods that are not necessary for personal or family survival, and a value system that makes this preoccupation an important component of individual and social evaluation. When the resources required to produce these goods and services are depleted beyond a reasonable level, it can be considered to be overconsumption.

Third World countries, here referred to as "developing countries", have certain general characteristics, such as relatively low per capita economic structures, occupational concentrations in agriculture and animal husbandry, high levels of urbanization, high population growth rates, and low levels of education. Despite the diversity of the socio-cultural environment of consumers in developing countries, they face similar economic problems. The socio-economic environment is transitional, with self-sufficient consumers at one end and urban elites with purchasing power who can enjoy a Western lifestyle at the other.

Because developing nations are rising quickly into the consumer class, the trends happening in these nations are of special interest. One prominent example is China's economic reforms in the late 1970s, in which the previously economically isolated state opened to foreign investment. Some argue that this economic revolution's outcome was most significantly influenced by foreign consumer economies, while others focus on China's internal market developments. Regardless, there has been much interest placed upon China's economic, political, and social shift towards consumerism.

According to the World Bank, the highest shares of consumption, regardless of income lie in food, beverage, clothing, and footwear. As of 2015, the top five consumer markets in the world were the United States, Japan, Germany, China, and France.

Planned and perceived obsolescence is an important factor that explains why some overconsumption of consumer products exists. This factor of the production revolves around designing products with the intent to be discarded after a short period of time. Perceived obsolescence is prevalent within the fashion and technology industries. Through this technique, products are made obsolete and replaced on a semi-regular basis. Frequent new launches of technology or fashion lines can be seen as a form of marketing-induced perceived obsolescence. Products designed to break after a certain period of time or use would be considered to be planned obsolescence. The dark side of this vicious cycle is that we have no choice but to keep replacing certain products, which results in a huge amount of waste, known as e-waste.

=== Affluence ===
According to a 2020 paper written by a team of scientists titled "Scientists' warning on affluence", the entrenchment of "capitalist, growth-driven economic systems" since World War II gave rise to increasing affluence along with "enormous increases in inequality, financial instability, resource consumption and environmental pressures on vital earth support systems". And the world's wealthiest citizens, referred to as "super-affluent consumers . . . which overlap with powerful fractions of the capitalist class," are the most responsible for environmental impacts through their consumption patterns worldwide.

Any sustainable social and environmental pathways must include transcending paradigms fixated on economic growth and also reducing, not simply "greening", the overconsumption of the super-affluent, the authors contend, and propose adopting either reformist policies which can be implemented within a capitalist framework such as wealth redistribution through taxation (in particular eco-taxes), green investments, basic income guarantees and reduced work hours to accomplish this, or looking to more radical approaches associated with degrowth, eco-socialism and eco-anarchism, which would "entail a shift beyond capitalism and/or current centralised states."

In other words, the concentration of wealth allows the affluent to shape policies that maintain consumption-driven economies, limiting systemic change. A 2020 Oxfam-SEI report found that the top 10% of earners contribute over half of global carbon emissions, while the wealthiest 1% emit more than double the poorest 50% combined. While green technologies offer solutions, the Jevons Paradox suggests efficiency gains often lead to increased overall consumption rather than reductions. Thus, tackling affluence-driven overconsumption requires progressive taxation on high-carbon activities, curbing luxury emissions, and shifting economic priorities from GDP growth to sustainability. Without intervention, extreme resource use by the wealthiest will continue to undermine global sustainability efforts.

== Effects ==
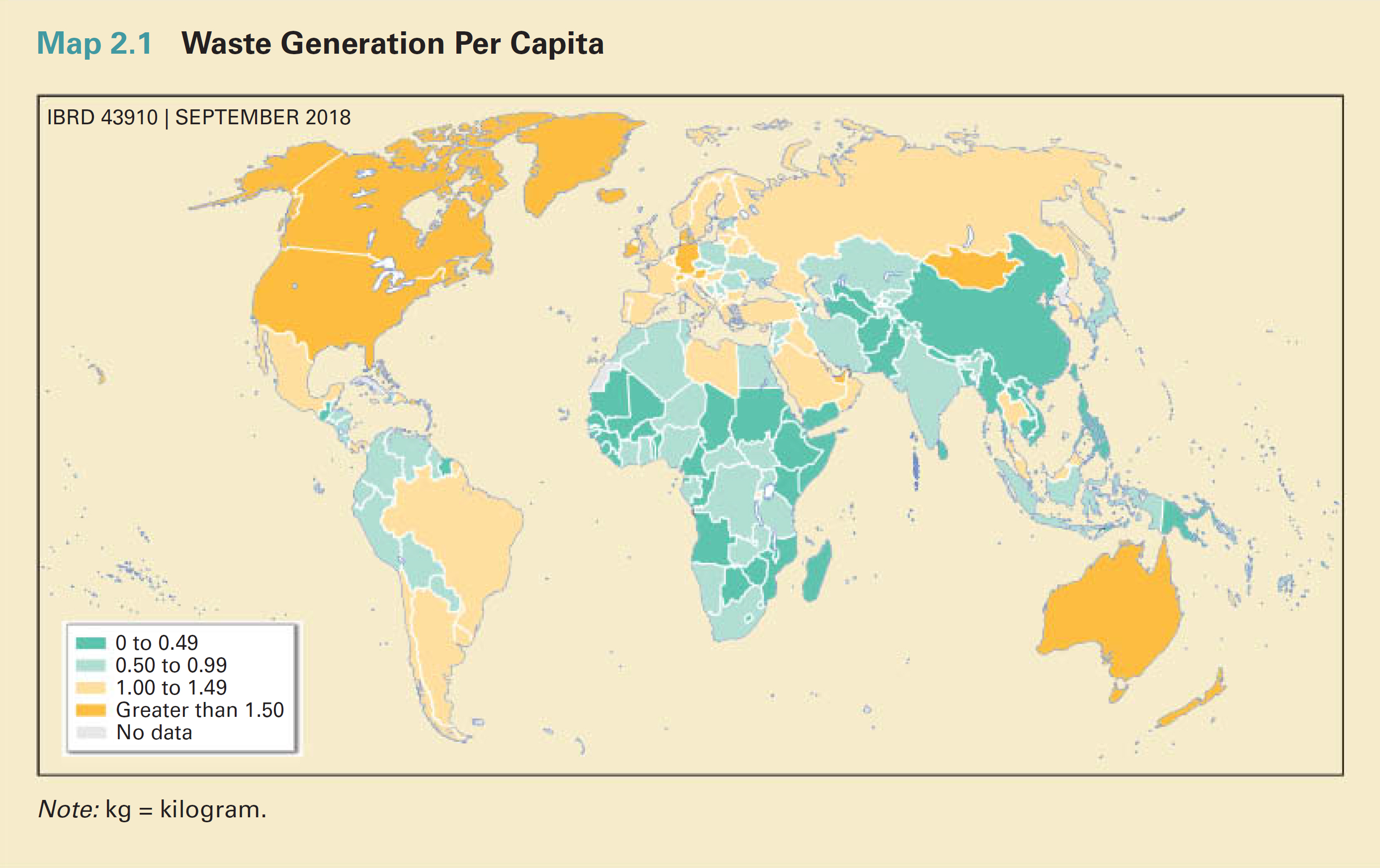
Waste generation, measured in kilograms per person per day

A fundamental effect of overconsumption is a reduction in the planet's carrying capacity. Excessive unsustainable consumption will exceed the long-term carrying capacity of its environment (ecological overshoot) and subsequently cause resource depletion, environmental degradation and reduced ecosystem health. In 2020 multinational team of scientists published a study, saying that overconsumption is the biggest threat to sustainability. According to the study, a drastic lifestyle change is necessary for solving the ecological crisis. According to one of the authors Julia Steinberger: "To protect ourselves from the worsening climate crisis, we must reduce inequality and challenge the notion that riches, and those who possess them, are inherently good." The research was published on the site of the World Economic Forum. The leader of the forum professor Klaus Schwab, calls for a "great reset of capitalism".

A 2020 study published in Scientific Reports, in which both population growth and deforestation were used as proxies for total resource consumption, warns that if consumption continues at the current rate for the next several decades, it can trigger a full or almost full extinction of humanity. The study says that "while violent events, such as global war or natural catastrophic events, are of immediate concern to everyone, a relatively slow consumption of the planetary resources may be not perceived as strongly as a mortal danger for the human civilization". To avoid it humanity should pass from a civilization dominated by the economy to a "cultural society" that "privileges the interest of the ecosystem above the individual interest of its components, but eventually in accordance with the overall communal interest".

The worldwide prevalence of obesity in males (2008)–the darker areas represent a higher percentage of obese males.

The scale of modern life's overconsumption can lead to a decline in economy and an increase in financial instability. Some argue that overconsumption enables the existence of an "overclass", while others disagree with the role of overconsumption in class inequality. Population, Development, and Poverty all coincide with overconsumption; how they interplay with each other is complex. Because of this complexity it is difficult to determine the role of consumption in terms of economic inequality.

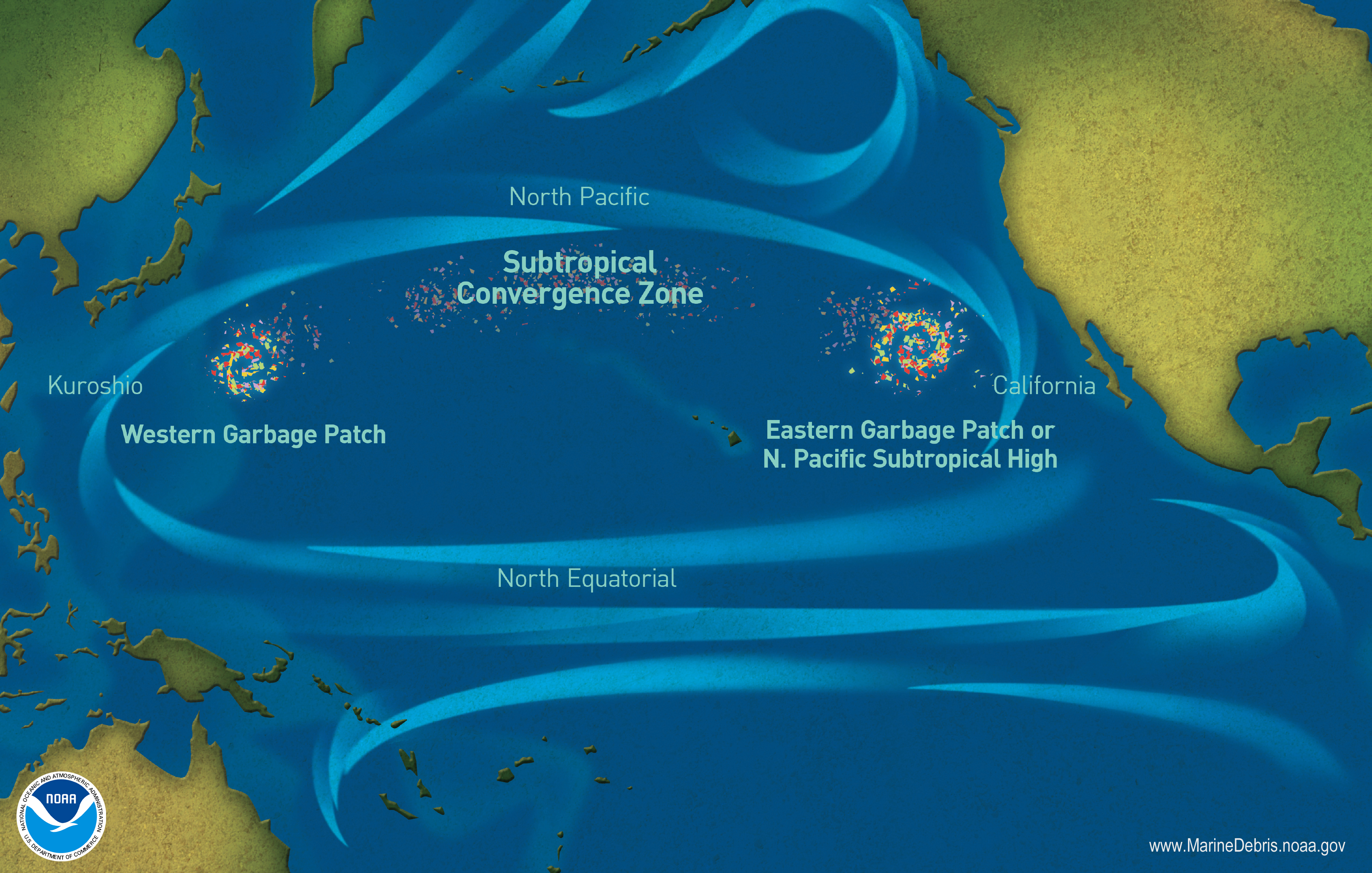
Great Pacific Garbage Patch

In the long term, these effects can lead to increased conflict over dwindling resources and in the worst case a Malthusian catastrophe. Lester Brown of the Earth Policy Institute, has said: "It would take 1.5 Earths to sustain our present level of consumption. Environmentally, the world is in an overshoot mode."

As of 2012, the United States alone was using 30% of the world's resources and if everyone were to consume at that rate, we would need 3-5 planets to sustain this type of living. Resources are quickly becoming depleted, with about a third already gone. With new consumer markets rising in the developing countries which account for a much higher percentage of the world's population, this number can only rise. According to Sierra Club's Dave Tilford, "With less than 5 percent of world population, the U.S. uses one-third of the world's paper, a quarter of the world's oil, 23 percent of the coal, 27 percent of the aluminum, and 19 percent of the copper." According to BBC, a World Bank study has found that "Americans produce 16.5 tonnes of carbon dioxide per capita every year. By comparison, only 0.1 tonnes of the greenhouse gas is generated in Ethiopia per inhabitant."

A 2021 study published in Frontiers in Conservation Science posits that aggregate consumption growth will continue into the near future and perhaps beyond, largely due to increasing affluence and population growth. The authors argue that "there is no way—ethically or otherwise (barring extreme and unprecedented increases in human mortality)—to avoid rising human numbers and the accompanying overconsumption", although they do say that the negative impacts of overconsumption can perhaps be diminished by implementing human rights policies to lower fertility rates and decelerate current consumption patterns.

=== Effects on health ===
A report from the Lancet Commission says the same. The experts write: "Until now, undernutrition and obesity have been seen as polar opposites of either too few or too many calories," "In reality, they are both driven by the same unhealthy, inequitable food systems, underpinned by the same political economy that is single-focused on economic growth, and ignores the negative health and equity outcomes. Climate change has the same story of profits and power,". Obesity was a medical problem for people who overconsumed food and worked too little already in ancient Rome, and its impact slowly grew through history. As to 2012, mortality from obesity was 3 times larger than from hunger, reaching 2.8 million people per year by 2017.

Just as overconsumption of food has led to widespread health crises such as obesity and metabolic diseases, the overconsumption of fossil fuels has created an equally dire threat to both human health and the environment. Both forms of overconsumption stem from economic models that prioritize growth and short-term gains over long-term sustainability. While industrialized food systems have fueled rising obesity rates, the relentless burning of fossil fuels—especially coal—has exacerbated air pollution, climate change, and public health risks on a global scale.

The overconsumption of fossil fuels, particularly coal, has profound implications for both environmental and human health. Burning fossil fuels releases a variety of harmful pollutants, including sulfur dioxide (SO_{2}), nitrogen oxides (NO_{x}), particulate matter (PM), and carbon dioxide (CO_{2}). These emissions contribute to environmental issues such as acid rain, smog, and climate change, while also posing significant health risks. In addition, exposure to fine particulate matter (PM2.5) from fossil fuel combustion is associated with respiratory diseases, cardiovascular diseases, and premature mortality. A 2021 study estimated that fossil fuel-related air pollution is responsible for over 10 million premature deaths annually worldwide. Coal-fired power plants are particularly detrimental, emitting toxic substances that adversely affect human health. Communities near these plants experience higher rates of asthma, lung disease, and other health issues. Workers at extraction sites and refineries face particularly severe occupational health risks, including end-stage respiratory diseases such as black lung disease, silicosis, chronic obstructive pulmonary disease, mesothelioma and other cancers, as well as safety risks from industrial fires and explosions.

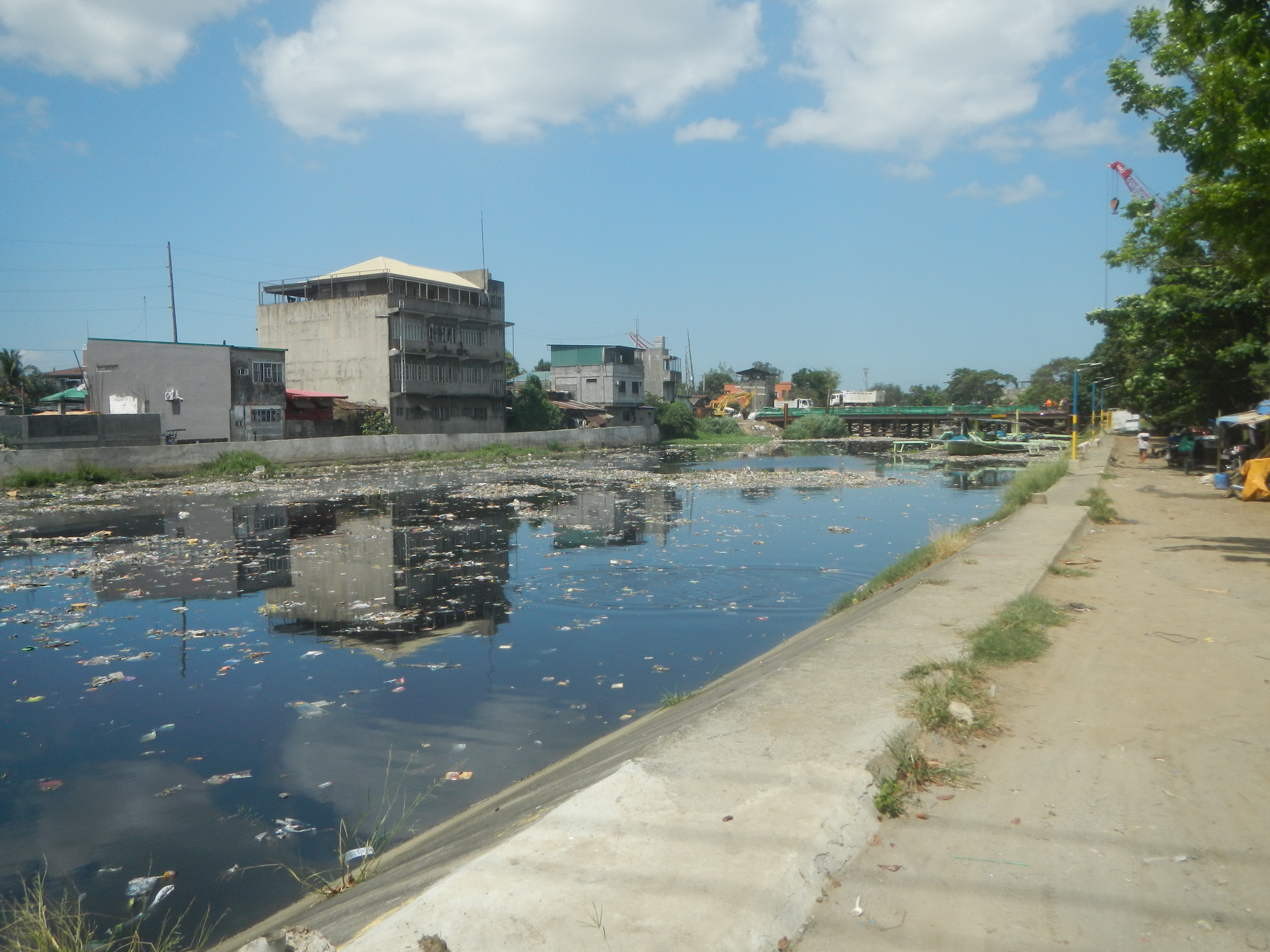
Plastic pollution in Marilao River

In China, the extensive use of coal has led to severe air pollution, yet China's coal-fired power generation capacity is growing rapidly resulting in significant public health challenges. The country's reliance on coal-fired power plants has been linked to increased respiratory illnesses and premature deaths.

Thus, addressing the health impacts of fossil fuel overconsumption necessitates a transition to cleaner energy sources, implementation of stricter emission regulations, and promotion of sustainable practices to reduce reliance on fossil fuels.

=== Global estimates ===
In 2010, the International Resource Panel published the first global scientific assessment on the impacts of consumption and production. The study found that the most critical impacts are related to ecosystem health, human health and resource depletion. From a production perspective, it found that fossil-fuel combustion processes, agriculture and fisheries have the most important impacts. Meanwhile, from a final consumption perspective, it found that household consumption related to mobility, shelter, food, and energy-using products causes the majority of life-cycle impacts of consumption.

According to the IPCC Fifth Assessment Report, human consumption, with current policy, by the year 2100 will be seven times bigger than in the year 2010.

== Footprint ==
The planet cannot support billions of meat-eaters.

— David Attenborough, natural historian

The idea of overconsumption is also strongly tied to the idea of an ecological footprint. The term "ecological footprint" refers to the "resource accounting framework for measuring human demand on the biosphere". Currently, China, for instance, has a per person ecological footprint roughly half the size of the US, yet has a population that is more than four times the size of the US. It is estimated that if China developed to the level of the United States that world consumption rates would roughly double. Other metrics have been formed to reflect different factors in calculating a country's carbon footprint. These include carbon intensity, which tracks carbon dioxide emissions per unit of GDP, of which China had 0.37 kilograms and the US had 0.25 kilograms in 2018, as well as consumption-based emissions, which attribute carbon emissions to the country in which a product is consumed, rather than the country in which it is produced. Accounting for such also has China at a higher emissions percentage, 25%, compared to the US's 16%.

Humans, their prevailing growth of demands for livestock and other domestic animals, has added overshoot through domestic animal breeding, keeping, and consumption, especially with the environmentally destructive industrial livestock production.

Globalization and modernization have brought Western consumer cultures to countries like China and India, including meat-intensive diets which are supplanting traditional plant-based diets. Between 166 and more than 200 billion land and aquatic animals are consumed by a global population of over 7 billion annually. A 2018 study published in Science postulates that meat consumption is set to increase as the result of human population growth and rising affluence, which will increase greenhouse gas emissions and further reduce biodiversity. Meat consumption needs to be reduced in order to make agriculture sustainable by up to 90% according to a 2018 study published in Nature.

With the developments in consumerism and growing demands for consumption otherwise, the concept of the climate debt has arisen. The term refers to the idea that larger countries have, in broad terms, caused more damage to the environment than their share of the world. These larger countries are often centered around consumer societies and, as a result, are the biggest producers and consumers, meaning that they contribute to pollution from the beginning (production) of a product's life, all the way to the end (consumption and disposal). Additionally, such societies are built upon economic growth, which begets more pollution from consumerism. The term also encapsulates the related idea that developing countries are the places that are the most affected by climate change, both in their effects and their ability to respond to and recover from those effects. In total, some argue that there is a severely one sided disparity between nations that create many forms of pollution and those who create very little pollution, which aligns opposite to the disparity between nations who are affected by the pollution and those who are more well-supplied to handle it.

Action upon repaying climate debt are proposed to be through reduction of emissions from the more developed, consumerist countries that are the biggest carbon emitters, which includes efforts to understand and heavily limit the extent to which they should reasonably emit greenhouse gasses in relation to their geographical and political boundaries. Additionally, action is proposed to be taken by supporting the affected underdeveloped countries by financial, industrial, and environmentally cleansing means.

56% of respondents to a 2022 climate survey support a carbon budget system to limit the most climate-damaging consumption (62% of those under 30).

Biomass of mammals on Earth
1. Livestock, mostly cattle and pigs (60.0%)
2. Humans (36.0%)
3. Wild animals (4.00%)

== Counteractions ==
The most obvious solution to the issue of overconsumption is to simply slow the rate at which materials are becoming depleted. From a capitalistic point of view, less consumption has negative effects on economies and so instead, countries must look to curb consumption rates but also allow for new industries, such as renewable energy and recycling technologies, to flourish and deflect some of the economic burdens. Some movements think that a reduction in consumption in some cases can benefit the economy and society. They think that a fundamental shift in the global economy may be necessary to account for the current change that is taking place or that will need to take place. Movements and lifestyle choices related to stopping overconsumption include: anti-consumerism, freeganism, green economics, ecological economics, degrowth, frugality, downshifting, simple living, minimalism, the slow movement, and thrifting.

Many consider the final target of the movements as arriving to a steady-state economy in which the rate of consumption is optimal for health and environment.

Recent grassroots movements have worked to find new ways to minimize consumption. The Freecycle Network, as one such method, is a network of people in one's community that are willing to trade goods for other goods or services. Not dissimilar to thrifting, it reduces the introduction of new consumables to a community.

Other researchers and movements such as the Zeitgeist Movement suggest a new socioeconomic model which, through a structural increase of efficiency, collaboration and locality in production as well as effective sharing, increased modularity, sustainability and optimal design of products, are expected to reduce resource-consumption. Solutions offered include consumers using market forces to influence businesses towards more sustainable manufacturing and products.

Another way to reduce consumption is to slow population growth by improving family planning services worldwide. In developing countries, more than 200 million women do not have adequate access. Women's empowerment in these countries will also result in smaller families.

Reducing resource consumption requires a fundamental shift away from selfish, consumer-oriented values towards pro-social values that motivate people to work towards limiting consumption in order to achieve environmental sustainability and promote the development and acceptance of economic and social policies aimed at curbing consumption levels.

Mindful consumption encourages individuals to moderate excessive acquisition and repetitive consumption by aligning their behavior with broader social and environmental goals. Emphasizing socially relevant benefits can help highlight the sustainable purpose of these services, thereby curbing overconsumption.

== See also ==
- Artificial demand
- Collaborative consumption
- Conspicuous consumption
- Consumption (economics)
- Criticism of capitalism
- Degrowth
- Effects of the car on societies
- Energy crisis
- Environmental studies
- Externality
- The Limits to Growth
- Mottainai
- Overexploitation
- Overshoot (population)
- Peak copper
- Peak oil
- Planet of the Humans (film)
- Preorder economy
- Santosha (renunciation of the need to acquire)
- Steady-state economy
- Surplus economics
- Surplus: Terrorized into Being Consumers (film)
- World Scientists' Warning to Humanity
