= Gossen =

Gossen may refer to:

== Economics ==
- Hermann Heinrich Gossen (1810–1858), Prussian economist
  - Gossen's laws, his laws concerning such economic concepts as scarcity and marginal utility
  - Gossen's second law
  - Gossen Prize

== Other ==
- Gossen, dative form of Gossa, a Norwegian island
- Gossen IL, a sports club from Gossa

== See also ==
- Franz Müller-Gossen (1871–1946), German painter
- Gosen (disambiguation)
