= Christopher Flavin =

American activist and writer

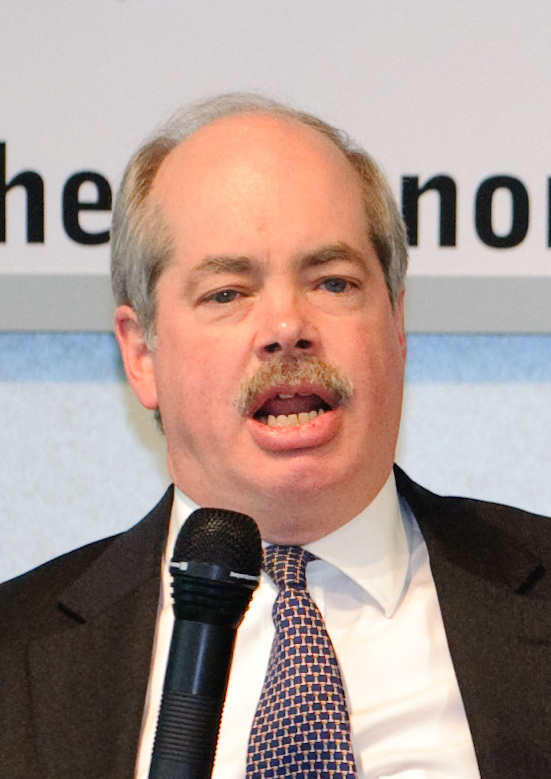
Christopher Flavin in 2010

Christopher Flavin is the former president of the Worldwatch Institute, an independent research organization focused on natural resource and environmental issues, based in Washington, D.C.. He is also a founding member of the Board of Directors of the Business Council for Sustainable Energy and is a member of the National Academy of Sciences Board on Energy and Environmental Systems, the Climate Institute, and the Environmental and Energy Study Institute. His research and writing focus is international energy and climate policy. One of his popular quotes on Sustainability states "Building a world where we meet our own needs without denying future generations a healthy society is not impossible, as some would assert. The question is where societies choose to put their creative efforts".

== Biography ==
Christopher Flavin has participated in several notable international conferences, including the Earth Summit in Rio de Janeiro in 1992 and the Climate Change Conference in Kyoto, Japan, in 1997. He has testified before national and state legislatures and meets frequently with government and international leaders.

Flavin is a native of Monterey, California and a cum laude graduate of Williams College, where he studied economics, biology, and environmental studies.

== Selected publications ==
- Power Surge: Guide to the Coming Energy Revolution, W.W. Norton, 1994.
- Rising Sun, Gathering Winds: Policies to Stabilize the Climate and Strengthen Economies, Worldwatch Paper 138, November 1997.
- Regular contributions to State of the World, Vital Signs and World Watch.
- Low-Carbon Energy: A Roadmap, 2008.

== See also ==
- State of the World 2008
- Lester Brown
- Amory Lovins
- Nourishing the Planet project
- State of the World 2011: Innovations that Nourish the Planet
