= Gosen =

Gosen may refer to:

- Gosen, Niigata, Japan
- Gosen-Neu Zittau, Brandenburg, Germany
- Gosen (Company), a Japanese manufacturer of sporting equipment
- Gosen Wakashū, an ancient Japanese poetry anthology
- Land of Goshen, an area in Biblical Egypt

== See also ==
- Gösen, Thuringia, Germany
