= Worldwatch Institute =

American environmental organization

- Formation: 1974; 52 years ago
- Dissolved: 2017; 9 years ago
- Founder: Lester R. Brown
- Website: https://worldwatch.org

The Worldwatch Institute was a globally focused environmental research organization based in Washington, D.C., founded by Lester R. Brown. Worldwatch was named as one of the top ten sustainable development research organizations by Globescan Survey of Sustainability Experts.

Brown left to found the Earth Policy Institute in 2000. The institute terminated in 2017, after publication of its last State of the World Report. Worldwatch.org was unreachable from mid 2019.

== Mission ==
The mission of the Institute read: "Through research and outreach that inspire action, the Worldwatch Institute works to accelerate the transition to a sustainable world that meets human needs. The Institute's top mission objectives are universal access to renewable energy and nutritious food, expansion of environmentally sound jobs and development, transformation of cultures from consumerism to sustainability, and an early end to population growth through healthy and intentional childbearing."

The Worldwatch Institute aimed to inform policymakers and the public about the links between the world economy and its environmental support systems. Research conducted by the institute was integrative or interdisciplinary and global in scope.

Worldwatch's priority programs included:

- Building a low-carbon energy system that dramatically reduces the use of fossil fuels and lowers greenhouse gas emissions.
- Nourishing the Planet - methods that create a sustainable food production system that provides a healthy, nutritious diet for all while sustaining the land, water, and biological resources on which life depends. The project resulted in the Worldwatch Institute's flagship publication, State of the World 2011: Innovations that Nourish the Planet.
- Transforming economies, cultures, and societies that meets human needs, promotes prosperity, and is in harmony with nature.

Worldwatch also monitored human health, population, water resources, biodiversity, governance, and environmental security.

== History ==
- 1974—The institute was founded by Lester Brown.
- 1975—The first Worldwatch Paper was published.
- 1984—First State of the World published.
- 1988—World Watch Magazine was launched.
- 1992—Vital Signs, Worldwatch's third annual series, was premiered.
- 2000—Christopher Flavin became President of Worldwatch in October.
- 2000—Lester R. Brown left, to found the Earth Policy Institute in 2001.
- 2008—Worldwatch hosted the 20th Anniversary of the James E. Hansen hearings.
- 2010—July/August edition of World Watch magazine was the last.
- 2011—Robert Engelman became President of Worldwatch in October.
- 2014—Ed Groark became Acting Interim President of Worldwatch.
- 2017—Ceased operations after its last State of the World report was published.

== Publications ==
Worldwatch Institute publications have been published in more than three dozen languages by its global partners in 40 countries. Worldwatch publications include:

- The State of the World report is an annual assessment of urgent global environmental problems and the innovative ideas proposed and applied across the globe to address them.
- Vital Signs tracks social, environmental and economic trends and publishes data and analysis.

== See also ==
- Lester R. Brown, founder of Worldwatch Institute
- Ed Ayres, former editor of Worldwatch, which ceased publication in 2010.
- Sustainable Development
- Environmental Movement
- List of environmental organizations
- World Nuclear Industry Status Report
