= Final utility =

Final Utility is the utility of a good when applied to our least desirable use of it. It is the estimated utility of the last use of a supply, i.e., the least important use of that supply. For example, if a use of a good must be given up, it will logically be the last use of the good we would choose. This is because we give up the least important of our satisfactions first—which would be the uses satisfied by the last good since we satisfy our more important needs first.

For example, if we lost a unit of a good, the value of the loss would be the value of the least important use of the good. This last good, which represents its final utility, was being applied to our least important wants. In the case of the lost good, it is replaced, and the value to which we can assign the loss is not the value of the first most important use of the good, but the least important—what we call the final utility.

According to the law of marginal utility, the value of each good in a stock of identical goods is the utility of the last and most easily dispensable unit. That is why price is said to be determined by supply and demand: the price reflects the (approximate and average) value of the good, but most closely reflects the value of the last use. If there is a shortage of supply, the good will cease being applied to its least important uses. All else being equal, the price will increase and the increase in price represents, so to speak, the value we attribute to the new last use. Before, with a larger supply, the last use was of less value to us. With a smaller supply the value of the last use is necessarily more important because we always satisfy our more important wants first. Therefore, the increase in price can be seen as a reflection of the increase in value we attribute to the last use of the supply.

Ludwig von Mises writes:

"When face with the problem of the value to be attached to one unit of a homogeneous supply, man decides on the basis of the value of the least important use he makes of the units of the whole supply; he decides on the basis of marginal utility."

== Example ==
If a hurricane struck Florida and there was a shortage of water, everything else equal, the price of bottled water would increase. Water in Florida, before this shortage, was used for drinking water, cooking, watering plants, and bathing. With the tap off, the price of bottled water has increased to such an extent that bottled water will surely not be purchased for watering plants or bathing. That is, the increase in price reflects the increase in the value we attribute to the last use of the last unit in the supply of the good. To explain, before the hurricane, water was valued according to the fact that it would be used for bathing and watering plants. Now, with a shortage, it is valued according to its ability to quench thirst and cook food. The latter uses importance is "approximated" in the price of the good. The bottled water which now costs, say, $20 a bottle, is an approximation of the value attribute to drinking water, cooking water, and whatever else it might be used for at the higher price—given that previous uses are not considered due to the shortage of supply and its corollary, the increase in price. That is why it is said that a homogeneous stock of goods is valued according to its final utility—according to its last use of a stock of a good.

A supply of a good will be applied to most important wants first and least important wants last. When there is a shortage, all else being equal, the price increases. The smaller supply is being used for the most important wants, but is not being used for the least important wants. In this sense, we can say the increase in price represents the increase in value which the last unit of the supply is filling. Before water cost very little and was used for washing and watering plants. Now, since there is not enough for washing and watering plants and it is instead being used exclusively to drink and cook—the value we attribute to those activities is, in a sense, communicated through the higher price. The price reflects that importance of the last use of a supply—and in this case the supply was truncated to only allow for the more important uses.

Final utility is the logical conclusion of marginal utility and a cornerstone of price theory.

== See also ==
- Austrian School of Economics
- Law of Marginal Utility
