= Ed Ayres (editor) =

American environmentalist

Edward H. Ayres (born October 1941) is an American writer, editor, environmentalist and ultramarathon runner. He is the founding editor and publisher of Running Times magazine, and he served as editorial director of the Worldwatch Institute and editor of Worldwatch, a bimonthly global-trends magazine. David M. Shribman states that Ayres has "inspired athletes worldwide and reshaped our ideas about endurance and sustainability".

== Early life and works ==
Ayres grew up in the New Jersey towns of Berkeley Heights and Westfield. He graduated from Swarthmore College in 1963 and briefly was a teacher at George School. He enjoys making furniture and sculptures out of geodes, petrified wood, and glass bottles.

== Achievements ==
He placed third in the first New York Marathon in 1970, and won the 1977 JFK 50 Mile.

In 1999, Ayres wrote God's Last Offer: Negotiating for a Sustainable Future in which he discusses four trends which he says threaten society: global warming caused by carbon dioxide, mass extinctions, a surge of consumption, and a population explosion. Publishers Weekly stated that "Ayres dismantles the perceptual obstructions that block our awareness of a crisis" but that he "comes up short in offering specific solutions" while Goodreads said that the book "presents a blueprint for a radical shift of policies and priorities to avoid a cataclysm".

In 2010, he was co-author of Crossing the Energy Divide: Moving from Fossil-Fuel Dependence to a Clean Energy Future (Prentice Hall).

Goodreads called his book The Longest Race (2012), an autobiography covering his attempt to run a 50-mile ultramarathon at age 60, an "urgent exploration of the connection between individual endurance and a sustainable society". Kirkus Reviews said that his " broad-ranging interests and accumulated wisdom will appeal to a wide readership, not just runners and environmentalists".

== Personal life ==
Ayres is a paleo-vegetarian who shopped at, and invested in, Whole Foods Market when the stock was still trading for well under $15/share. Ayres is married and has a daughter.

== Selected bibliography ==
- God's Last Offer: Negotiating for a Sustainable Future. New York: Four Walls Eight Windows. 2000. ISBN 978-1-56858-174-3.
- The Longest Race: A Lifelong Runner, an Iconic Ultramarathon, and the Case for Human Endurance. New York: The Experiment. 2012. ISBN 978-1-61519-063-8.
- What's Good for GM. Aurora Publishers. 1970. ISBN 9780876951125.
