= Environmentally honest market system =

Market system internalizing environmental costs

In economics, an environmentally honest market system (abbr. honest market) refers to a market which reflects ecological and environmental health costs such as resource depletion and pollution.

== Externalities ==
The principal feature of an environmentally honest market system is the control of negative externalities. Firms operating within unregulated free market systems pay for the private costs of their actions - the direct costs that are accepted as fundamental to the manufacture of their products. However, they also generate external costs, or negative externalities; additional costs created during the process, which are borne by neither the buyer nor the seller and are left for third parties to pay for.

It is suggested that today, with global markets characterised by the massive number of parties interacting as both buyers and sellers, the external, indirect costs of production can often exceed the internal costs. For example, the indirect costs of burning coal, such as air pollution, acid rain, devastated ecosystems and climate change can often exceed the direct costs which the company pays for, namely the costs of mining and transportation.

== Achieving an environmentally honest market system ==
Whilst traditional economic opinion supports the notion that ecological resources are a factor of human economic systems, ecological economists argue that economic systems are instead subsystems of the biosphere. Proponents of ecological economics expound the concept that the Earth's resources are finite, sustainable development is integral to future economic success, and that the real costs of market activity, including the negative impacts on health and the environment, should be reflected in true prices (full cost pricing). There are various strategies that ecological economists suggest can create a more honest market.

=== Imposition of environmental taxes ===
When externalities are generated, such as the noxious fumes in our example, the full social costs aren't accounted for, meaning the price will be set too low, and the quantity consumed will be greater than the socially optimal level, as at point Qp. A Pigouvian tax is set equal to the value of the externality so that prices rise to reflect the full costs of production, and demand decreases to Qs, demonstrated by the supply curve's shift to the left.

One effective method of tackling externalities is through government intervention, with the imposition of environmental or 'green' taxes. Take, for example, a plant which emits noxious fumes in the process of smelting copper. These fumes cause health issues for individuals who live in the plant's vicinity, to the sum of x dollars per ton of copper output. The plant owners have no obligation to cover these costs and therefore they are not included in private cost calculations; this means output occurs at a level where the marginal social cost exceeds the marginal private cost and the level of output exceeds the quantity which is optimally beneficial to society. This market failure can be addressed with the introduction of a Pigouvian tax, whereby the government imposes a tax on either output (the copper produced), or input (the coal used in the smelting process). The level of the tax should equal the level of negative externalities, so that the producers are now responsible for the full cost of their activity and output falls to the socially optimal level.

==== Environmental taxes ====
Whilst the United States has been reluctant to implement environmental taxes on a wide scale, many European companies have shown more enthusiasm towards their use. The European Commission defines an environmental tax as: "a tax whose base is a physical unit (or a proxy of it) of something that has a proven, specific negative impact on the environment." Revenue from these taxes is thought to equal 3 percent of GDP in Europe.

In the United Kingdom, an environmental tax that is currently enforced is the landfill tax, which taxes the disposal of waste, encouraging waste producers to produce less waste, and incentivising recycling and composting. In 2012, the landfill tax raised £1.1 billion in the United Kingdom, and by 2016 this figure is expected to have risen to £1.6 billion.

In 2002, the Republic of Ireland became the first country to impose a tax on plastic bags - the 'PlasTax', whereby customers pay $0.15 per plastic bag they consume at the checkout. This measure has proved one of the most successful green taxes to date, and similar schemes are being considered in the UK, Australia and New York City. The economic and environmental impact of the tax is signified by the fact that consumption has dropped by approximately 90 percent from 1.2 billion bags a year to 230 million a year, the amount of litter has significantly decreased, and 18,000,000 litres of oil have been saved due to the reduced production of plastic bags. This demonstrates how the imposition of an environmental tax can change consumer behaviour so that the free market acts in a more environmentally conscious fashion.

==== Criticism of environmental taxes ====
Criticism of the use of environmental taxes is based on the premise that these taxes are regressive, because individuals from lower-income households spend a larger proportion of their income on products such as fuel, and therefore are more heavily burdened by the imposition of such taxes. The questionable social implications of the introduction of environmental taxes acts as a major hindrance to the introduction of environmental tax reform. In support of this notion, research figures suggest that in the EU, a 10 percent increase in gas and electricity prices would reduce the real household income of the 1st quintile by 0.69 percent, compared to only 0.43 percent for the 5th quintile.

=== Removal of government subsidies ===
Subsidies which are harmful to the environment are often referred to as 'perverse subsidies'. Such subsidies are estimated to cost the world's governments up to $1.9 trillion/year, and can take a direct form, such as financial support, or an indirect form, such as tax exemptions.

A case which provides compelling evidence for the removal of government subsidies to correct explicit market failure is that of Iran, where the energy industry is heavily subsidised. This means that oil prices are one tenth the world price, and using cars is a cheap and convenient mode of transport. The World Bank calculates that if the $37 billion a year subsidy were removed, then carbon emissions would be reduced by 49 percent. A further advantage is that as fuel becomes more expensive, car manufacturers within the country are forced to produce more energy-efficient models to meet market demand. Evidently, removal of subsidies can have far-reaching environmental implications.

==== Current trends in subsidy removal ====
As the detrimental impact of the careless use of resources becomes clearer and the issue becomes ever more pressing, many governments around the world are moving towards the eradication of subsidies to industries that cause ecological damage. For example, France, Belgium and Japan have entirely eradicated all subsidies to the coal industry. Germany halved its coal subsidy from $2.8 billion in 1989 to $1.4 billion in 2002, and intends to remove all subsidies by 2018. As oil prices rise around the world, a number of countries, including Nigeria, China and Indonesia, have greatly reduced or entirely removed subsidies that held fuel prices well below world prices.

Whilst many countries around the world have begun to view the eradication of subsidies as an economic and environmental necessity, the United States maintains large subsidies to the coal and nuclear industries. A 2006 survey by Douglas Koplow, founder of Earth Track, calculated that US federal subsidies to the energy industries total $74 billion. Throughout his incumbency, President Obama has annually addressed the topic of the abolition of taxpayer subsidies to oil companies, with calls to re-allocate the money to renewable energy sources and alternative fuel technology research instead. In 2011 he stated in a letter to congressional leaders: "CEOs of the major oil companies have made it clear that high oil prices provide more than enough profit motive to invest in domestic production without special tax breaks. As we work together to reduce our deficits, we simply can't afford these wasteful subsidies." Despite his persistent attempts, however, Congress have yet to pass significant reforms.

=== Emissions trading ===
A further strategy which sets out to protect the environment and ensure only socially optimal levels of potentially harmful goods are produced is to enforce emissions trading, or 'Cap and Trade' schemes. Such projects require a central agency, usually the government, to set a level of emissions that they regard as socially and environmentally acceptable, known as the 'cap'. They then distribute permits that allow the holder to release a specified quantity of emissions. The quantity of permits issued is set proportionately to the overall emissions cap. For example, if the government regards an acceptable level of emission to be one million tons, then one million one-ton permits will be issued.

In the United States, the Acid Rain Program provides one example of the effectiveness of allowance trading. Under this system, units are allocated permits based on their prior levels of emissions. Allowances permit a unit to emit one ton of Sulfur Dioxide, and for each ton of Sulfur Dioxide emitted in a given year, one permit is retired. These permits can be bought, sold or banked, meaning more efficient units can sell their unused permits to less efficient units. As a result, tradable permits reduce pollution by replicating a free market system where monetary gain can act as an incentive, as opposed to rigid, strictly enforced regulatory methods which are the alternative.

== See also ==
- Environmental pricing reform – Economics concept
- Natural capital accounting – Calculation of total stocks and flows of natural resources and services
- Environmental full-cost accounting – Cost accounting method
- Green tax shift – Compulsory fee intended to discourage environmentally harmful acts
- Environmental tariffs – Tariff to equalise externality costs
- Environmental governance – Concept in political ecology and environmental policy
- Circular economy – Production model to minimise wastage and emissions
- Social cost of carbon – Monetary damage caused by greenhouse gases
- Cost–benefit analysis – Systematic approach to estimating the strengths and weaknesses of alternatives
