= Gossen's laws =

Laws about marginal utility in economics

Gossen's laws are three laws of economics that were articulated by Hermann Heinrich Gossen (1810–1858):

- Gossen's First Law is the law of diminishing marginal utility: that marginal utilities are diminishing across the ranges relevant to decision-making.
- Gossen's Second Law, which presumes that utility is at least weakly quantified, is that in equilibrium an agent will allocate expenditures so that the ratio of marginal utility to price (marginal cost of acquisition) is equal across all goods and services.

$$\frac{\partial U/\partial x_i}{p_i}=\frac{\partial U/\partial x_j}{p_j}\,\forall\left(i,j\right)$$
where
- $U$ is utility
- $x_i$ is quantity of the $i$-th good or service
- $p_i$ is the price of the $i$-th good or service

- Gossen's Third Law is that scarcity is a precondition for economic value.

== See also ==
- Marginalism
