= Gosen (company) =

Japanese synthetic string company

Gosen Co., Ltd.
- Company type: Public
- Industry: Sporting equipment
- Founded: 1951
- Headquarters: Osaka, Japan
- Key people: Sumiyuki, Kimura, President
- Products: Strings, Racquets, Shuttlecocks, Shoes, Apparel, Accessories
- Number of employees: 224 approx.
- Website: www.gosen.jp

Gosen Co., Ltd. (株式会社ゴーセン, Kabushiki-gaisha Gōsen) is a Japanese company that produces synthetic strings for the fishing, manufacturing and racquet sport industries (more specifically tennis, soft tennis and badminton).

== Overview ==
The company focuses on three main industries: fishing tackle, manufacturing and sporting goods.

=== Fishing tackle ===
Gosen has been manufacturing fishing lines and hooks for more than 50 years. While most of the range is designed for the Japanese domestic market, the range of products is starting to grow on the international market. More recently, international export only models such as the Mebarin PE, W Braided fishing and Casting 16 line. These lines have been known to be quite thin, whilst maintaining softness and smoothness. Gosen are still the only company to successfully produce a 16 strand braided line that is now recognized as the industry benchmark in diameter to strength ratings.

=== Manufacturing ===
Gosen synthetic threads and strings have benefited multiple industries around the world. The threads are used in a number of applications such as: sewing apparel for major clothing manufacturers; seat belts, airbags and motor coils in vehicles; construction; surgical threads; ornament strings; and artificial hair.

=== Sporting goods ===
Gosen specialises in tennis, soft tennis and badminton sporting goods. The brand has been in the industry for more than 60 years, and its products have been previously approved by the International Tennis Federation, the Indonesia Badminton Association and the Badminton World Federation. Top players such as Rod Laver, Jim Courier, Jimmy Connors, Chris Evert Lloyd, Conchita Martínez and Anna Kournikova have also previously used and promoted this brand.

== History ==
- 1951 Gosen Co., Ltd. was established and started manufacturing nylon synthetic thread.
- 1960 Gosen develops "HY-Sheep".
- 1968 Japan Tennis Association official recognises Gosen tennis strings. Japan Soft Tennis Federation officially recognises "HY-Sheep S".
- 1969 Gosen obtains patent on the manufacturing of badminton rackets with shafts made entirely from steel. Release of lightweight racquet "Excellent".
- 1973 Grand Slam tennis champion Rod Laver (Australia) signs agreement to promote Gosen.
- 1980 Gosen releases jointless carbon badminton racket.
- 1981–1982 Top-tier tennis players Jimmy Connors and Chris Evert Lloyd sign international agreement to promote Gosen.
- 1985 Indonesia Badminton Association officially recognises Gosen strings.
- 1986 International Tennis Federation officially recognises Gosen strings.
- 1994 Conchita Martínez (Spain) signs agreement to promote Gosen tennis strings "Tecgut Pro" for wide-body tennis rackets.
- 1996 International Badminton Federation officially recognises Gosen badminton strings.
- 1998 Gosen develops "Gavun" shaft, and Roots racket, featuring two-kick points.
- 1999 Gosen develops revolutionary biodegradable string "Biogut". Malaysian Badminton Association signs sponsorship agreement with Gosen.
- 2000 Anna Kournikova signs agreement to promote Gosen tennis strings and grips. Gosen releases AK series tennis strings co-developed with Kournikova.
- 2001 Gosen adopts super alloy "Aermet" in strings and racquets.
- 2003 Gosen develops Roots series with patented mechanism WPP (Wave Power Performance).
- 2005 Gosen adopts nanotechnology in strings – "Nanocubic"
- 2007 Gosen develops R4X badminton string with Quattro-Fiber.
- 2009 Gosen develops the FG tennis string – world's first flat-shaped string.
- 2010 Gosen signs partnership with Penang Badminton Association (PBA).
- 2011 Professional tennis player Peng Shuai (China) signs agreement to promote Gosen tennis strings.
- 2013 Gosen enters partnership with Southern Tasmania Badminton Association (STBA), Badminton Geelong Inc. (BGI), NSW Badminton Association (NSWBA) and ACT Badminton Association (ACTBA).; Professional badminton player Hiroyuki Saeki (Japan) and Ryota Taohata (Japan) signs agreement to promote Gosen badminton racquets; Professional tennis player Kaichi Uchida (Japan) signs agreement to promote Gosen tennis strings
- 2014 Gosen enters partnership with Brisbane Badminton Association (BBA); develops "G-Tone Series" strings which uses their "micro-fusion" manufacturing process around the string core.

== Summary of racquet sport products ==
=== Gosen strings ===
Gosen was one of the world's first companies that had its strings approved by the International Badminton Federation (now known as Badminton World Federation), and the International Tennis Federation. Gosen was also the first to manufacture synthetic strings and has a longstanding history in string manufacturing and the introduction of stringing techniques. All Gosen strings are made in Japan. Some have patented designs.

==== Badminton ====
- G-Tone Series – a new string with revised manufacturing process (e.g. G-Tone 5, G-Tone 9)
- Multilade Series (patented string design) — Uses patented quattro-fiber wrap design. Models in this series are more commonly known by the prefix "R4X" (e.g. R4X 110, R4X Momone).
- CT-Sheep Series — Uses special resin coating. Models in this series are more commonly known by the prefix "Pro" (e.g. Pro 66 and Pro 77).
- Nanocubic Series (patent application in progress) — Uses special nano-coating that combines a multifilament core with monofilament wraps. Models include: Nanomicro.

==== Tennis and soft tennis ====
- Polylon Series — Special blended polyester strings.
- Umishima Series — Designed using a patented string construction.
- FG Series (patent application in progress) — The world's first flat-shaped string.
- Tecgut Series (patented string design)
- OG-Sheep Series — the series with models containing the prefix of "Micro" (such as Micro Super 16, Micro 16).

Gosen also manufactures an additional 24 tennis strings, and 21 soft tennis strings, which are only available domestically in Japan. Gosen manufactures 2 additional series:

- Gosen-X (Hybrid) Series
- HY-Sheep Series

=== Gosen racquets ===
Gosen was one of the world's first companies to make jointless carbon rackets. The company uses "High Modulus Graphite" in their entry and middle-level racket ranges and use M30 and M40 carbon material for their higher-end rackets.

==== Badminton ====
- Ryoga Series – shafts co-developed by Seiko Rod, Toray and Gosen. It consists of the Ougi, Shiden, Tenbu and Issen.
- Gungnir Series – first series to be manufactured in Taiwan with 80 grommet design
- Customedge Series – designed to allow a weight to be added onto the edge of the frame
- Roots Series – contains a patented shaft
- Trivista Series
- Mira and Miracle Light Series
- Grapower Series
- Legendary Series
- Training Series

==== Tennis and soft tennis ====
Gosen manufactures a range of tennis and soft tennis rackets which are only available in Japan. It includes the following series:

- Evolve Series
- Trivista Series
- Hishun Series
- Axthies Series
- Miracle Light Series

=== Gosen grips ===
Gosen produces replacement grips and over-grips that are made in Taiwan and Japan. All "AC" series are Made in Japan.

=== Gosen shuttlecocks ===
Gosen produces two types of shuttlecocks: feather and nylon.

==== Feather shuttlecocks ====
All Gosen feather shuttlecocks are Made in China. Examples include:
Goose Feather:

- Gosen GF1 and GF10 – Certified by the Japan Badminton Association (now known as the Nippon Badminton Association).

Duck Feather:

- Gosen GF70

==== Nylon shuttlecocks ====
Gosen produces nylon shuttlecocks are Made in Taiwan. An example is:

- Gosen GN-105H – Certified by the Japan Badminton Association (now known as Nippon Badminton Association).

== Gosen Haribito Project ==
In Japan, the term Haribito relates to a person who is a doctor of strings. A certified Haribito member is a stringing specialist, who has in-depth knowledge about strings, qualified Haribito skills and is able to provide advice to help players in finding a suitable string and tension that matches their skills and abilities. Gosen's own Gosen Stringing Pattern has been in use for decades in both tennis and badminton, and endorsed by professional coaches, players and managers worldwide. There are also several major international tournaments which use the Gosen Stringing Pattern, including: Rakuten Japan Open, Fed Cup (Japan / Korea Team), Davis Cup (Japan Team), and Malaysia Opens. The Gosen Stringing Pattern is regularly reviewed and improved upon, based on current rackets in the market and feedback from its users. Gosen holds regular seminars to share the latest information and Haribito techniques with all participants.

== Advisory staff ==
The following players are the advisory staff for Gosen:

=== Current advisory staff ===
==== Tennis ====
- (Japan) Kaichi Uchida – Polybreak 16 and AK Pro CX16; Top 2013 International Tennis Federation ranking: Junior Male's Single: 3
- (Japan) Akiko Morigami – Umishima AK Power 16; Top 2005 WTA ranking: Women's Single: 41; Top 2007 WTA ranking: Women's Doubles: 59
- (Japan) Kotomi Takahata – Tech Flex 16; Won 2011 Women's Doubles – Nikke National Japanese Tennis Championships
- (Vietnam) Hoang Thanh Trung – Egg Power 16; Top 2011 National ranking: Men's Single: 1
- (Vietnam) Nguyen Anh Thang – Polybreak 16; Top 2011 National ranking: Men's Single: 6

==== Badminton ====
- (Thailand) Thitipong Lapho, – R4X110; Top 2011 National ranking: Men's Doubles: 1 and Mixed Doubles: 3

==== Fishing ====
- (Australia) Paul Carter
- (Japan) Norihiro Shigemi

=== Previous advisory staff ===
==== Tennis ====
- (China) Peng Shuai – Polybreak 16 and Wintex 900; Top 2014 WTA ranking: Women's Doubles: 1; Top 2011 WTA ranking: Women's Single: 14
- (Russia) Anna Kournikova – Super Tec AK Pro 16; Top 2000 WTA ranking: Women's Single: 8; Top 1999 WTA ranking: Women's Doubles: 1
- (Spain) Conchita Martínez – Tec Gut Pro 16; Top 1995 WTA ranking: Women's Single: 2; Top 1993 WTA ranking: Women's Doubles: 7
- (United States) Chanda Rubin – OG Micro 16; Top 1996 WTA ranking: Women's Single: 6; Top 1996 WTA ranking: Women's Doubles: 9
- (United States) Chris Evert Lloyd – Top 1975 WTA ranking: Women's Single: 1
- (Australia) Rod Laver – Top 1961 National ranking: Men's Single: 1
- (United States) Jim Courier – OG Micro JC; Top 1992 National ranking: Men's Single: 1
- (United States) Jimmy Connors – Top 1974 National ranking: Men's Single: 1
- (South Africa) Wayne Ferreira – OG Super 16; Top 1996 National ranking: Men's Single: 6; Top 2001 National Ranking Men's Doubles: 9

==== Badminton ====
- (Thailand) Boonsak Ponsana – Roots Aermet 6900 Pro (limited edition Boonsak Ponsana model); BWF Highest Ranking: 4
- (Japan) Hiroyuki Saeki – Customedge Type X; BWF Ranking: Men's Doubles: 38
- (Japan) Ryota Taohata – Customedge Type X; BWF Ranking: Men's Doubles: 38; Mixed Doubles: 178

== Distributors ==
=== Asia ===
- Bangladesh
- China – Guangzhou GS Sports Ltd.
- Hong Kong – GS (Hong Kong) Limited
- India – T&T International
- Indonesia – A.J. Sports
- Malaysia – GS SPORTS WORLD SDN BHD
- Philippines – Sonia Trading
- Russia – Star Dreams
- South Korea – Sports Republic Limited
- Sri Lanka – United Sports
- Taiwan – Shen Min Trading Co., Ltd
- Thailand – The Parrot Sports Ltd.
- United Arab Emirates – Silver Shield Trading Co. L.L.C.
- Vietnam – GOMAX SPORTS COMPANY LIMITED

=== Europe ===
- Austria – Spartan Sport
- Italy – P.T. 2.1

=== North and South America ===
- (United States) North and Latin America – Sportmode, Inc.

=== Oceania ===
- Australia – RX Group Pty Ltd.
- (Australia) Fishing - Gladiator Fishing Tackle
