= Lester R. Brown =

American environmental analyst

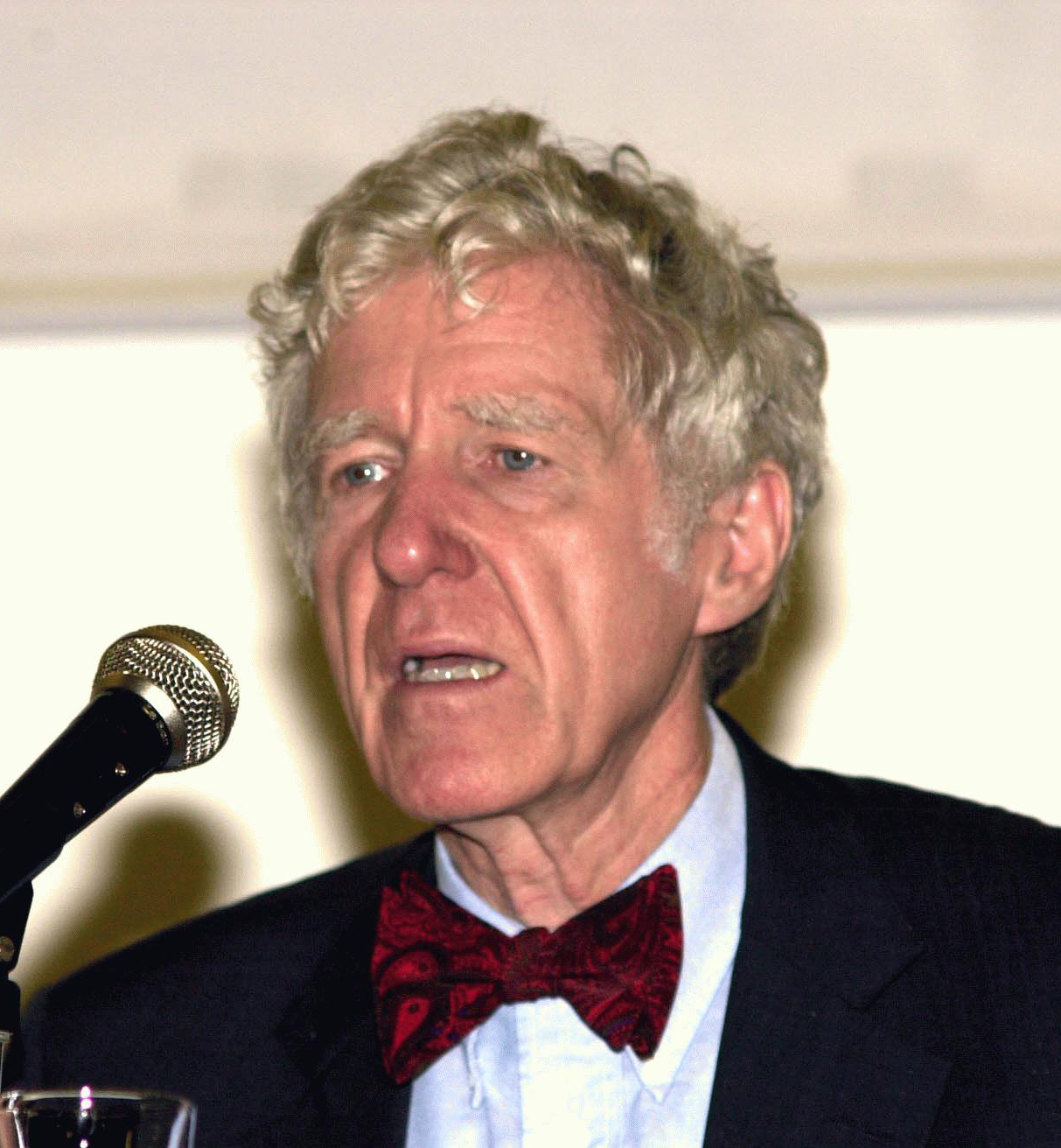
- Lester Brown in 2003.
- Born: Lester Russel Brown; March 28, 1934 (age 92); Bridgeton, New Jersey, U.S.
- Education: Rutgers University (B.S., 1955); University of Maryland (M.S., 1959); Harvard University (M.P.A., 1962)
- Occupations: Global environmental analyst, author
- Years active: 1963–2015
- Known for: Analysis of global warming, food shortages, water depletion and energy shortages
- Website: Earth Policy Institute

Lester Russel Brown (born March 28, 1934) is an American environmental analyst, founder of the Worldwatch Institute, and founder and former president of the Earth Policy Institute, a nonprofit research organization based in Washington, D.C. BBC Radio commentator Peter Day referred to him as "one of the great pioneer environmentalists."

Brown is the author or co-author of over 50 books on global environmental issues and his works have been translated into more than forty languages. His most recent book is The Great Transition: Shifting from Fossil Fuels to Solar and Wind Energy (2015), in which he explains that the global economy is now undergoing a transition from fossil and nuclear energy to clean power from solar, wind, and other renewable sources. His previous book was Full Planet, Empty Plates: The New Geopolitics of Food Scarcity (2012).

Brown emphasizes the geopolitical effects of fast-rising grain prices, noting that "the biggest threat to global stability is the potential for food crises in poor countries," and one that could "bring down civilization." In Foreign Policy magazine, he describes how the "new geopolitics of food" has, in 2011, already begun to contribute to revolutions and upheaval in various countries.

The recipient of 26 honorary degrees and a MacArthur Fellowship, Brown has been described by the Washington Post as "one of the world's most influential thinkers." As early as 1978, in his book The Twenty-Ninth Day, he was already warning of "the various dangers arising out of our manhandling of nature...by overfishing the oceans, stripping the forests, turning land into desert." In 1986, the Library of Congress requested his personal papers noting that his writings "have already strongly affected thinking about problems of world population and resources," while president Bill Clinton has suggested that "we should all heed his advice." In 2003 he was one of the signers of the Humanist Manifesto.

In the mid-1970s, Brown helped pioneer the concept of sustainable development, during a career that started with farming. Since then, he has been the recipient of many prizes and awards, including, the 1987 United Nations Environment Prize, the 1989 World Wide Fund for Nature Gold Medal, and the 1994 Blue Planet Prize for his "contributions to solving global environmental problems." In 1995, Marquis Who's Who selected Brown as one of its "50 Great Americans." He was recently awarded the Presidential Medal of Italy and was appointed an honorary professor at the Chinese Academy of Sciences. He lives in Washington, D.C., and retired in June 2015.

== Early life ==
Brown was born and raised on a farm without running water or electricity in Bridgeton, New Jersey near the Delaware River. He learned to read early and was a voracious reader. He was fascinated by World War II and would borrow day-old papers from the next door farm to follow it. He especially enjoyed reading biographies including those of America's founding fathers and others such as Abraham Lincoln, George Washington Carver, and Marie Curie. From his earliest years, he worked on the farm, milking cows, pulling weeds, and cleaning the stable. An enterprising youth, he involved his younger brother, Carl, in various businesses, such as growing pheasants and chickens for sale. In 1951, they started a tomato growing business, which eventually grew to become one of New Jersey's largest, with sales of over 1,520,000 pounds (690,000 kg) a year. He later said, "farming is all I ever wanted to do with all my life. You have to know soils, weather, plant pathology, entomology, management, even politics. It's the ideal interdisciplinary profession."

== Education ==
Shortly after earning a degree in agricultural science from Rutgers University in 1955, through the International Farm Youth Exchange Program, he spent six months living in rural India where he became intimately familiar with food and population issues. "His experiences in Indian villages changed his life," wrote biographer David De Leon. "Although he went back to growing tomatoes when he returned to the United States, this no longer seemed like exciting work."

Brown decided that to work on the global food issue, he would need to work for the U.S. Department of Agriculture's (USDA) Foreign Agricultural Service (FAS). He learned that before they would hire him, he needed to have a degree in agricultural economics. Brown took nine months to earn a master's degree in agricultural economics from the University of Maryland and in 1959 joined FAS as an international agricultural analyst in the Asia branch. A year or so later, he took a nine-month leave to earn a master of public administration from the Harvard Graduate School of Public Administration, which was later to become the John F. Kennedy School of Government.

In 1963, just four years later, he published Man, Land and Food, the first comprehensive projection of world food, population, and land resources to the end of the century. The study was a cover story in the January 6, 1963 issue of U.S. News & World Report where it came to the attention of Secretary of Agriculture, Orville Freeman. Freeman appreciated Brown's bold analysis and offered him a job on his staff, saying "you sketched the problems. Now you have to do something about them." He was soon elevated to being the resident specialist on global issues. In this capacity, he advised the secretary of agriculture on his overseas agricultural policies. He also headed USDA's International Agricultural Development Service from 1966 to 1969. His primary job was to "increase food production in underdeveloped countries."

In early 1969, he left government to help establish the Overseas Development Council. He also became an enthusiastic believer in the promise of a Green Revolution, with the hope of using better seeds and cultivation methods to help solve global problems of poverty and hunger. In his opinion, "this technology was the most crucial historical event since the steam engine." In subsequent years, however, he realized that rapid population growth in undeveloped countries was overwhelming the gains in increased food production.

== Career as environmental activist ==
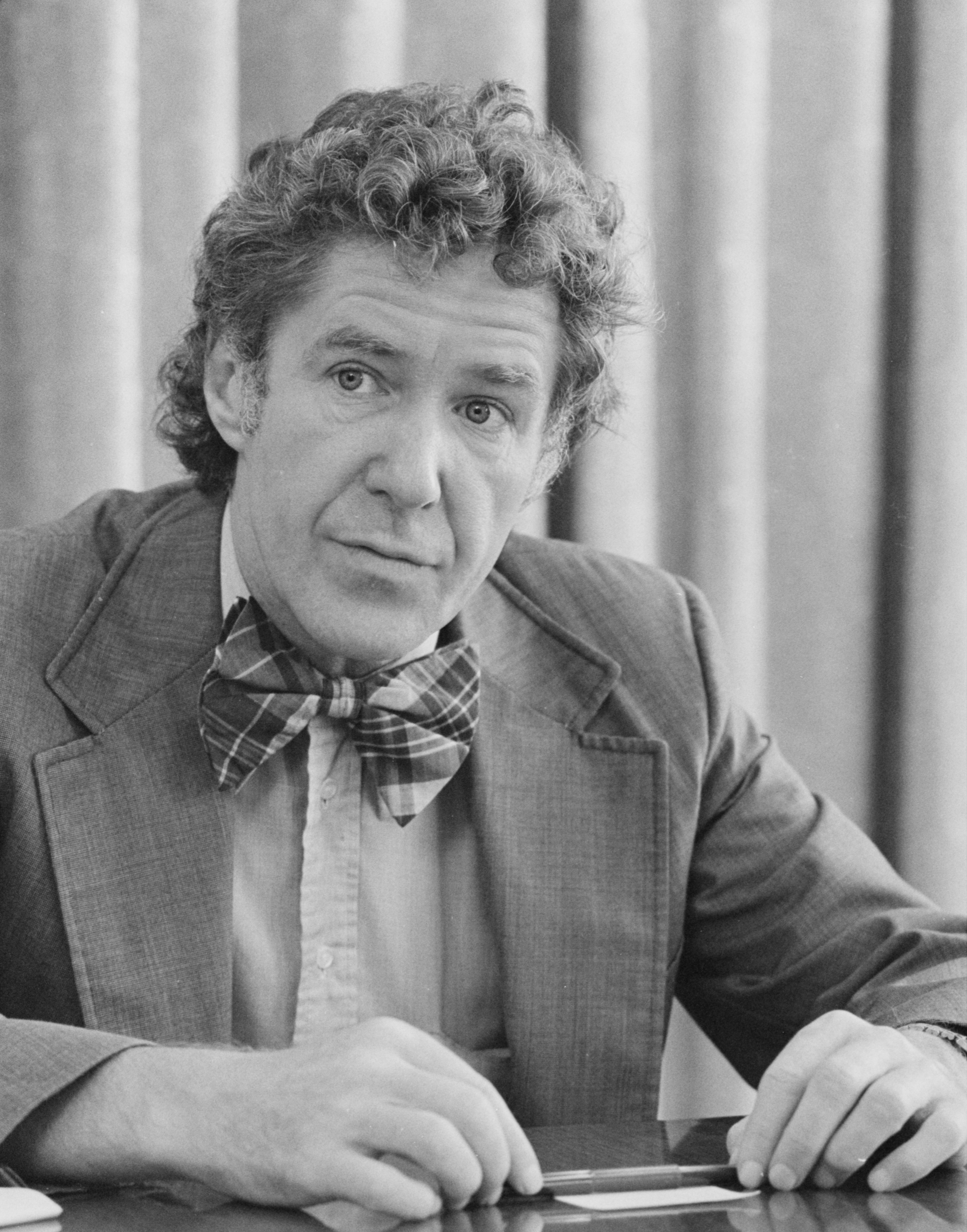
Lester Brown in 1981

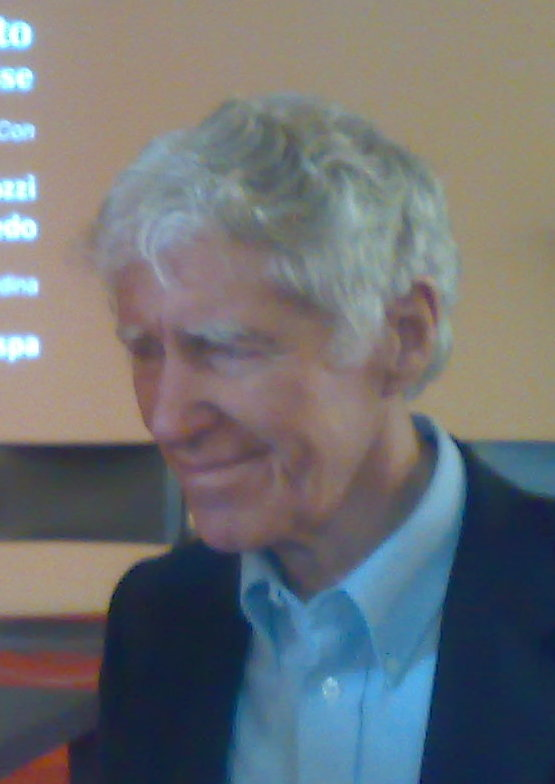
Lester Brown in 2009

In 1974, with support of a $500,000 grant from the Rockefeller Brothers Fund, Brown founded the Worldwatch Institute, the first research institute devoted to the analysis of global environmental issues. While there he launched the Worldwatch Papers, the annual State of the World reports, World Watch magazine, a second annual entitled Vital Signs: The Trends That are Shaping Our Future, and the Environmental Alert book series. According to De Leon, "he gathered a staff of young idealists just out of college. They were expected to be 'professional generalists,' rather than narrow specialists with advanced degrees."

The institute eventually became noted for being an independent and respected think tank focusing on environmental issues and also a storehouse for a large amount of environmental information. Their goal was to educate the public and government about environmental problems and to recommend actions. The institute has refused to become a lobbying organization, with Brown saying, "the world is filled with specialists who dig deep burrows into the earth and bring up these nuggets of insight, but there's no one up on top pulling it all together. That's our job." As a result, he has been described as "one of the world's most influential thinkers" and was granted a $250,000 "genius award" by the MacArthur Foundation in 1986.

In 1991, in his acceptance speech for the Humanist of the Year award from the American Humanist Association, Brown spoke about the dual environmental challenges of population growth and global environmental decline which he attributes to unsustainable economic activity. Because he views the problems associated with nuclear power: cost, safety, and waste storage, as well as the risks of proliferation, he believes that solar is the only sustainable choice for humanity. "We have the opportunity as a generation to build an economic system that can last as long as the sun. None of our forebears had that opportunity. It's an exciting challenge; it's doable."

In 2001, he left Worldwatch Institute to establish the Earth Policy Institute, devoted to providing a plan to save civilization. At the institute, his years of working on global issues through an interdisciplinary lens enabled him to identify trends those working in specialized areas might not see. They also allowed him to consider global solutions to the many environmental concerns of today. Some of the more important works Brown wrote at the Institute include World on the Edge: How to Prevent Environmental and Economic Collapse (2011), Eco-Economy: Building an Economy for the Earth (2001), and the Plan B series. His most recent book was The Great Transition: Shifting from Fossil Fuels to Solar and Wind Energy (2015) co-authored with Janet Larsen, J. Matthew Roney, and Emily E. Adams.

On June 30, 2015, he officially retired and closed the Earth Policy Institute. The World Watch Institute was closed in about 2017. His legacies will live on through a Lester R. Brown Reading Room at Rutgers University (his alma mater). The room will house the collection of his books along with their translations, honorary degrees, and awards. His electronic collection of presentations, radio and television interviews, and documentaries in which he is featured will be accessioned into the Rutgers University library system. Rutgers is also hosting the Earth Policy Institute's website so that the information remains available.

The Library of Congress received his personal papers from his early years, through his career spanning the United States Department of Agriculture, the Overseas Development Council, Worldwatch Institute, and the Earth Policy Institute.

"…a small think tank with a knack of spotting new trends…" – Geoffrey Lean, Telegraph

== Environmentalist and author ==
=== Issuing warnings ===
After a talk at Catawba College in 2008, the college newspaper referred to him as an "environmental Paul Revere," [as] he warned his audience that "unless civilization changes its ways, its end is truly near... we're in a race between natural tipping points and political tipping points, - 'what we need most of all is for the market to tell the environmental truth.' " He added, "We don't need to go beyond our ice melts to know that we're in trouble. How much are we willing to spend to avoid a 23 foot rise in sea level?" He explained that "indirect costs are shaping our future," and by ignoring these, "we're doing exactly the same thing as Enron- leaving costs off the books. Consuming today with no concern for tomorrow is not a winning philosophy." He spoke of rapid population growth, deforestation, and "two new stresses – rising food and oil prices." "As oil prices go up, grain prices will follow," he said.

=== Offering solutions ===
In 2001 Brown suggested a "tax shifting" structure which would reduce income taxes and offset them with taxes on environmentally destructive activities such as carbon emissions. It would lead to an "honest market", he said, by adding a tax on carbon to pay for the hidden costs of climate change. It would also account for the environmental costs of things such toxic waste, the overuse of raw materials, mercury emissions, the generation of garbage, the use of pesticides, and the use of throwaway products such as plastic bottles, all activities that would be discouraged by taxing. He says that by keeping such environmental costs "off the books," and thereby hidden, society risks the same fate as a large company such as Enron, which failed immediately after auditors learned they had kept major costs off their books.

Brown subsequently added that such a tax shift would amount to an "honest market," explaining, "The key to restructuring the economy is the creation of an honest market, one that tells the ecological truth." In 2011 he estimated the cost of such a tax shift, including the effects of better technology, the use of renewables and "updating the concept of national security."

In December 2008, Brown presented ways of creating new jobs by public investment in both the renewable energy industry and in energy efficiency technology. He included growth statistics along with the calculated number of jobs that would be created.

== Books (selection) ==
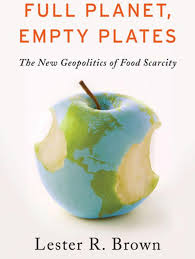
Full Planet, Empty Plates (2012).

Brown has authored or co-authored over 50 books. which have appeared in some 40 languages. Among his earlier books are Man, Land and Food, World Without Borders, and Building a Sustainable Society. His 1995 book Who Will Feed China? challenged the official view of China's food prospect, spawning many conferences and seminars.

In May 2001, he founded the Earth Policy Institute to provide a vision and a road map for achieving an environmentally sustainable economy. In November 2001, he published Eco-Economy: Building an Economy for the Earth, which was hailed by E.O. Wilson as "an instant classic." In 2009 he published 'Plan B 4.0' and in 2011 World on the Edge. In 2012 he published Full Planet, Empty Plates.

=== Who Will Feed China? ===
In this book, published in 1995, Brown highlights the pressure on world resources as more countries, especially China, become developed. He writes, "To feed its 1.2 billion people, China may soon have to import so much grain that this action could trigger unprecedented rises in world food prices."

In February 2014, he updated that forecast stating that China had since become a leading world grain importer, "set to buy a staggering 22 million tons" in the 2013-2014 trade year and their grain use climbing by 17 million tons per year.

=== Outgrowing the Earth ===
This book, published in 2004, is a more recent description of "the ways in which human demands are outstripping the earth's natural capacities, and how the resulting environmental damage is undermining food production on a global scale. He documents that the decrease of crop production is due to global warming, water shortages, decreasing cropland in developing countries like China, and population growth that is still increasing world population by 76 million each year.

=== Plan B 4.0 ===
This book, published in 2009, continues the themes of his earlier books, and is written as a final warning call for the leaders of the world to begin "mobilizing to save civilization" and stresses even more that time is of the essence.

At California State University, Chico, Plan B has become "required reading for all incoming freshmen." The university says that it is being used in many courses in History, English, Philosophy, Communications, Political and Social Science.

=== Breaking New Ground: A Personal History ===
In the fall of 2013, Brown published his autobiography. In Breaking New Ground, Brown details the seminal events of his life that led him to establish the first research institute devoted to an interdisciplinary analysis of global environmental issues. Of the book, David Orr said: "This is the life story of a true American hero . . . as a scientist and public intellectual dedicated to the cause of sustainability, Lester Brown is in a class by himself." David Suzuki said: "Lester Brown is one of humanity's great eco-warriors, constantly updating the state of the planet while ceaselessly seeking solutions and a path to sustainability. Breaking New Ground is an inspirational story of what one person is capable of achieving. Every aspiring activist will find much to learn from Lester Brown's life story."

=== The Great Transition: Shifting from Fossil Fuels to Solar and Wind Energy (2015) ===
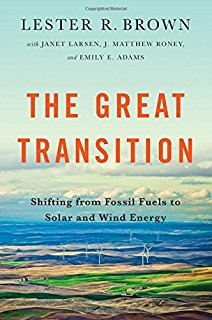
The Great Transition (2015).

The book covers the rapid growth of a global energy revolution that uses renewable sources. Countries are replacing coal and nuclear power as their energy sources and moving toward renewable energies. While solar energy was originally developed for small-scale residential use, today major utility-scale solar projects are being built globally. Single wind farm complexes in some countries will produce as much electricity as several nuclear power plants. New transport systems in countries like China are also relying on electricity, while more people use bicycles for local commuting.

== Awards and recognition ==
Lester Brown is the recipient of many prizes and awards, including 25 honorary degrees, and is an honorary professor of the Chinese Academy of Sciences.

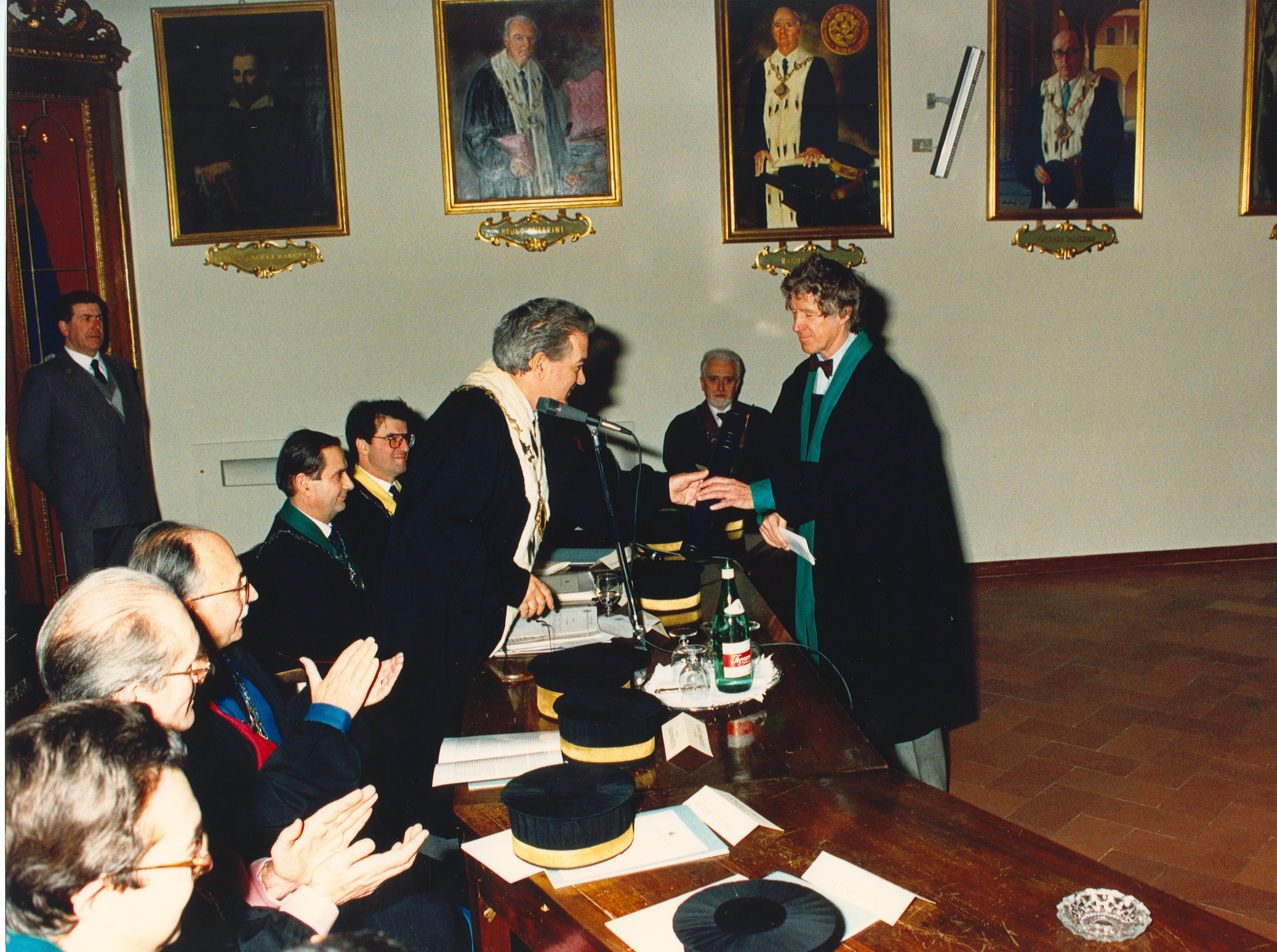
February 14, 1991: Lester Brown is receiving HC degree in Agricultural Sciences at the University of Pisa (Italy)

- 1965 Recipient of Superior Service award, United States Department of Agriculture
- 1965 Arthur S. Flemming award
- 1981 A.H. Boerma award, U.N. Food and Agriculture Organization
- 1982 UN Environmental Program Leadership medal
- 1985 Lorax award of the Global Tomorrow Coalition
- 1989 World Wildlife Fund for Nature - International
- 1987 UN Environmental prize
- 1991 Laurea Honoris Causa (HC degree) in Agricultural Sciences, University of Pisa, Italy
- 1991 A. Bizzozero award, University of Parma
- 1991 Humanist of the Year award, American Humanist Association
- 1991 Pro Mundo Habitabili award, King Carl Gustaf XVI, Sweden
- 1991 Delphi International Cooperation award
- 1992 Cervia Ambiente prize, Italy
- 1992 Robert Rodale Lecture award
- 1993 Certificate of Special Recognition from the Association of American Geographers
- 1994 Blue Planet prize, Asahi Glass Foundation
- 1994 J. Sterling Morton Arbor Day award
- 1995 Public Service award, Federation of American Scientists
- 1995 Rachel Carson Environmental Achievement award
- 2000 Bruno H. Schubert Foundation environment award
- 2001 Natural Business Leadership award
- 2002 Excellence Advantage award, International Fund for China's Environment
- 2002 Italian Presidential medal
- 2003 George and Greta Borgstrom prize, Royal Swedish Academy of Agriculture and Forestry
- 2005 Claire Matzger Lilienthal Distinguished Lecture award, California Academy of Science
- 2008, Heifer All-Star (Heifer International Annual Award)
- 2009, Charles A. and Anne Morrow Lindbergh Award
- 2010, University of Maryland Alumni Hall of Fame
- 2010, Hero Award, Alliance for Sustainable Colorado
- 2012, Earth Hall of Fame Kyoto
- 2012, Green Carpet Award for Distinguished Service, Harvard University
- 2012, Planet and Humanity Award, International Geographical Union
- 2013, Green Leadership Award, American Renewable Energy Institute
- 2014, Distinguished Service Award, World Future Society

Honorable mention

- 2010 One of top 100 top global thinkers, by Foreign Policy magazine
- 2011 One of top 100 top global thinkers, by Foreign Policy magazine

Literary Awards

- Christopher Award for By Bread Alone
- Ecologia Firenze (Italian literary award) for The Twenty-Ninth Day
- A.H. Boerma Award, FAO, for writings on the world food problem
- Best Translated Book, award from the Ministry of Culture, Iran, for Full House
- Best Nonfiction Book award from the Peka Institute, Iran, for Eco-Economy
- National Library of China book award for Plan B (Chinese edition)

== Bibliography ==
- Man, Land and Food (1963)
- Increasing World Food Output (1965)
- Seeds of Change (1970)
- Man and His Environment: Food (with Gail Finsterbusch) (1972)
- World Without Borders (1972)
- In the Human Interest (1974)
- By Bread Alone (with Erik Eckholm, 1974)
- The Twenty-Ninth Day (1978)
- Running on Empty (with Colin Norman and Christopher Flavin, 1979)
- Building a Sustainable Society (1981)
- State of the World (with others, 1984–2001)
- Vital Signs (with others, 1992–2001)
- Eko Keizai Kakumei: Environmental Trends Reshaping The Global Economy (1998, in Japanese)
- Saving the Planet: How to Shape an Environmentally Sustainable Global Economy (with Christopher Flavin and Sandra Postel, 1992)
- Full House: Reassessing the Earth's Population Carrying Capacity (with Hal Kane, 1995)
- Who Will Feed China?: Wake-Up Call for a Small Planet (1995)
- Tough Choices: Facing the Challenge of Food Scarcity (1996)
- Beyond Malthus: Nineteen Dimensions of the Population Challenge (with Gary Gardner and Brian Halweil) (1999)
- Eco-Economy: Building an Economy for the Earth (2001) ISBN 0-393-32193-2
- Earth Policy Reader (with Janet Larsen and Bernie Fischlowitz-Roberts, 2002) ISBN 0-393-32406-0
- Plan B: Rescuing a Planet Under Stress and a Civilization in Trouble (2003) ISBN 0-393-32523-7
- Outgrowing the Earth: The Food Security Challenge in an Age of Falling Water Tables and Rising Temperatures (2004) ISBN 0-393-32725-6
- Plan B 2.0: Rescuing a Planet Under Stress and a Civilization in Trouble (2006) ISBN 978-0-393-32831-8
- Plan B 3.0: Mobilizing to Save Civilization (2008) ISBN 978-0-393-33087-8
- Plan B 4.0: Mobilizing to Save Civilization (2009) ISBN 978-0-393-33719-8
- World on the Edge: How to Prevent Environmental and Economic Collapse (2011) ISBN 0-393-33949-1
- Full Planet, Empty Plates: The New Geopolitics of Food Scarcity (2012) ISBN 978-0-393-08891-5 (cloth) 978-0-393-34415-8 (pbk)
- Breaking New Ground: A Personal History (2013) ISBN 978-0-393-24006-1
- The Great Transition: Shifting from Fossil Fuels to Solar and Wind Energy (with Emily Adams, Janet Larsen and Matthew Roney, 2015) ISBN 9780393350555
