= State of the World (book series) =

Book series published by the Worldwatch Institute

The State of the World (SoW) was a series of books published annually from 1984 to 2017 by the U.S. based Worldwatch Institute, a thinktank that was founded in the 1970s by renowned environmentalist Lester R. Brown and ceased operations in 2017. The series attempted to identify the planet's most significant environmental challenges.

The 2010 edition discussed different ways of changing current cultures such that it felt as natural to live sustainably as living as a consumer felt at the time. The 2011 edition looked at the global food crisis and surrounding environmental and social problems, with a particular emphasis on global innovations that could help solve that worldwide problem. The 2012 edition showcased innovative projects, creative policies, and fresh approaches that were advancing sustainable development in the twenty-first century. The 2013 edition defined the term sustainability, and assessed attempts to cultivate it.

== Editions ==
- State of the World 1984 ISBN 0-393-30176-1
- State of the World 1985 ISBN 0-393-30218-0
- State of the World 1986 ISBN 0-393-30255-5
- State of the World 1987 ISBN 0-393-30389-6
- State of the World 1988 ISBN 0-393-30440-X
- State of the World 1989 ISBN 0-393-30567-8
- State of the World 1990 ISBN 0-393-30614-3
- State of the World 1991 ISBN 0-393-30733-6
- State of the World 1992 ISBN 0-393-30834-0
- State of the World 1993 ISBN 0-393-30963-0
- State of the World 1994 ISBN 0-393-31117-1
- State of the World 1995 ISBN 0-393-31261-5
- State of the World 1996 ISBN 0-393-31339-5
- State of the World 1997 ISBN 0-393-31569-X
- State of the World 1998 ISBN 0-393-31727-7
- State of the World 1999 ISBN 0-393-31815-X
- State of the World 2000 ISBN 0-393-31998-9
- State of the World 2001 ISBN 0-393-04866-7
- State of the World 2002 ISBN 0-393-32279-3
- State of the World 2003 ISBN 0-393-05173-0
- State of the World 2004: Special Focus: The Consumer Society ISBN 0-393-32539-3
- State of the World 2005: Redefining Global Security ISBN 0-393-32666-7
- State of the World 2006: Special Focus: China and India ISBN 0-393-32666-7
- State of the World 2007: Our Urban Future ISBN 978-0-393-32923-0
- State of the World 2008: Innovations for a Sustainable Economy ISBN 978-0-393-33031-1
- State of the World 2009: Into a Warming World ISBN 978-0-393-33418-0
- State of the World 2010: Transforming Cultures: From Consumerism to Sustainability ISBN 978-0-393-33726-6
- State of the World 2011: Innovations that Nourish the Planet ISBN 978-0-393-33880-5
- State of the World 2012: Moving Toward Sustainable Prosperity ISBN 978-1-61091-037-8
  - The Path to Degrowth in Overdeveloped Countries, ch. 2.
- State of the World 2013: Is Sustainability Still Possible? ISBN 978-1-61091-449-9
- State of the World 2014: Governing for Sustainability ISBN 1610915410
- State of the World 2015: Confronting Hidden Threats to Sustainability ISBN 978-1-61091-610-3
- State of the World 2016: Can a City Be Sustainable? ISBN 9781610917551
- State of the World 2017: Earth ED: Rethinking Education on a Changing Planet ISBN 9781610918428
