= Earth Policy Institute =

American environmental organization

- Founded: 2001
- Founder: Lester R. Brown
- Dissolved: 2015
- Type: Environmental Research
- Purpose: Environmentalism
- Location: Washington, D.C.
- Key people: Reah Janise Kauffman, Vice President; Janet Larsen, Director of Research
- Website: www.earth-policy.org

Earth Policy Institute was an independent non-profit environmental organization based in Washington, D.C., in the United States. It was founded by Lester R. Brown in 2001 and functioned as an environmental think tank, providing research and analysis on environmental indicators and making policy and lifestyle recommendations aimed at promoting environmental and economic sustainability.

Cited by environmental advocates, as well as policymakers and journalists, the institute was a nonprofit that still provides articles, data resources, and select free downloads of their books on their website.

In June 2015, the Institute announced that, with Brown's retirement, it would close its doors. Its website is archived by Rutgers University.

== Description ==
The Earth Policy Institute functioned as a think-tank, providing policy research and recommendations on sustainable development and living, as well as on environmental issues.

EPI's goals were

1. to provide a global plan for moving the world onto an environmentally and economically sustainable path,
2. to provide examples demonstrating how the plan would work, and
3. to keep the media, policymakers, academics, environmentalists, and other decision-makers focused on the process of building a Plan B economy.

== Publications and releases ==
The Institute sent out articles called Updates, Eco-Economy Indicators, Book Bytes, Data Highlights, and Press Releases to the media and the general public on a free low-volume e-mail listserv and also posted them on its website along with supporting data and sources for additional information.

=== Publications ===
Publications were released in several languages. International publishers for books can be found on the website, as well as links to other organizations who publish the translations of articles.

==== Books ====
The Institute released the following books:

- Eco-Economy: Building an Economy for the Earth.
- The Earth Policy Reader
- Outgrowing the Earth: The Food Security Challenge in an Age of Falling Water Tables and Rising Temperatures
- Plan B: Rescuing a Planet Under Stress and a Civilization in Trouble
- Plan B 2.0: Rescuing a Planet Under Stress and a Civilization in Trouble
- Plan B 3.0: Mobilizing to Save Civilization
- Plan B 4.0: Mobilizing to Save Civilization
- World On The Edge
- Full Planet, Empty Plates: The New Geopolitics of Food Scarcity
- Breaking New Ground: A Personal History
- The Great Transition: Shifting from Fossil Fuels to Solar and Wind Energy

=== Releases ===
==== Updates ====
Earth Policy Institute stated that Plan B Updates are original, four-page analyses of environmental issues ranging from worldwide advances in renewable energy to deaths from heat waves to new flows of environmental refugees.

==== Eco-Economy Indicators ====
Earth Policy Institute stated that eco-Economy Indicators consist of the 12 trends EPI used to measure progress toward building a Plan B world. The 12 trends are Overpopulation, Global Economy, Grain Harvest, Fish Catch, Forest Cover, Water Resources, Carbon Emissions, Global Temperature, Ice Melting, Wind Power, Bicycle Production, and Solar Power.

==== Book Bytes ====
Book Bytes were highlights and adaptations from EPI's books and research.

EPI regularly contributed releases to other websites, including:

- Sustainablog
- Care2

== Closing ==
The institute's June 2015 announcement of its closing began:

All good things must come to an end, and we at the Earth Policy Institute (EPI) find ourselves sadly at the end of a road filled with many successes. With our president and founder, Lester Brown, stepping down at the age of 81, we are closing our doors on June 30, 2015. Our awesome staffers are finding new posts to continue their work, and we are certain that they will be able to further the issues EPI has pursued.

The announcement added:

We are delighted to say that our website and all of its information, data, and research publications will remain available to you. The School of Environmental and Biological Sciences at Rutgers University has agreed to keep our site available as a legacy website.

== See also ==
- Human overpopulation
- Eco-economic decoupling
