= Marginal utility =

Benefit derived from consuming a product

In mainstream economics, marginal utility refers to the change in utility (pleasure or satisfaction resulting from the consumption) of one unit of a good or service. Marginal utility can be positive, negative, or zero. Negative marginal utility implies that every consumed additional unit of a commodity causes more harm than good, leading to a decrease in overall utility. In contrast, positive marginal utility indicates that every additional unit consumed increases overall utility.

In the context of cardinal utility, liberal economists postulate a law of diminishing marginal utility. This law states that the first unit of consumption of a good or service yields more satisfaction or utility than the subsequent units, and there is a continuing reduction in satisfaction or utility for greater amounts. As consumption increases, the additional satisfaction or utility gained from each additional unit consumed falls, a concept known as diminishing marginal utility. This idea is used by economics to determine the optimal quantity of a good or service that a consumer is willing to purchase.

== Marginality ==
In the study of economics, the term marginal refers to a small change, starting from some baseline level. Philip Wicksteed explained the term as follows:

Marginal considerations are considerations which concern a slight increase or diminution of the stock of anything which we possess or are considering. Another way to think of the term marginal is the cost or benefit of the next unit used or consumed, for example the benefit that you might get from consuming a piece of chocolate. The key to understanding marginality is through marginal analysis. Marginal analysis examines the additional benefits of an activity compared to additional costs sustained by that same activity. In practice, companies use marginal analysis to assist them in maximizing their potential profits and often used when making decisions about expanding or reducing production.

== Utility ==
Utility is an economic concept that refers to the level of satisfaction or benefit that individuals derive from consuming a particular good or service, which is quantified using units known as utils (derived from the Spanish word for useful). However, determining the exact level of utility that a consumer experiences can be a challenging and abstract task. To overcome this challenge, economists rely on the concept of revealed preferences, where they observe the choices made by consumers and use this information to rank consumption options from the least preferred to the most desirable.

Initially, the term utility equated usefulness with the production of pleasure and avoidance of pain by moral philosophers, Jeremy Bentham and John Stuart Mill. In line with this philosophy, the concept of utility was defined as "the feelings of pleasure and pain" and further as a "quantity of feeling".

Contemporary mainstream economic theory frequently defers metaphysical questions, and merely notes or assumes that preference structures conforming to certain rules can be usefully proxied by associating goods, services, or their uses with quantities, and defines "utility" as such a quantification.

In any standard framework, the same object may have different marginal utilities for different people, reflecting different preferences or individual circumstances.

== Law of diminishing marginal utility ==
The law states that as the amount consumed of a commodity increases, other things being equal, the utility derived by the consumer from the additional units, i.e., marginal utility, goes on decreasing. For example, three pieces of candy are better than two pieces, but the twentieth piece does not add much to the experience beyond the nineteenth (and could even make it worse). This principle is so well established that economists call it the "law of diminishing marginal utility" and it is reflected in the concave shape of most utility functions. This concept is fundamental to understanding a variety of economic phenomena, such as time preference and the value of goods.

Assumptions -

1. All the units of a commodity must be identical, i.e., same in all respects - in size, colour, design, quality, etc.
2. The unit of the good must be standard, e.g., a bottle of cold drink, a pair of shoes, a full mango, etc. The units must not be too small or too large.
3. There should be no change in taste of the consumer during the process of consumption.
4. The utility is measurable.
5. The consumer is rational while taking consumption decisions.
6. There must be a continuity in consumption and if a break in the continuity is necessary, the time interval between the consumption of two units must be short.
7. There should be no change in the price of substitute goods.

Modern economics employs ordinal utility to model decision-making under certainty at a specific point in time. In this approach, the number assignment to an individual's utility for a particular situation hold no significance on their own. Rather, the significance lies in the comparison between two different circumstances and which one holds a higher utility. With ordinal utility, a person's preferences do not have a unique marginal utility, making the concept of diminishing marginal utility irrelevant. On the other hand, diminishing marginal utility is a significant concept in cardinal utility, which is used to analyse intertemporal choice, choice under uncertainty, and social welfare in modern economic theory.

The law of diminishing marginal utility is that subjective value changes most dynamically near the zero points and quickly levels off as gains (or losses) accumulate. And it is reflected in the concave shape of most subjective utility functions.

Given a concave relationship between objective gains (x-axis) and subjective value (y-axis), each one-unit gain produces a smaller increase in subjective value than the previous gain of an equal unit. The marginal utility, or the change in subjective value above the existing level, diminishes as gains increase.

As the rate of commodity acquisition increases, the marginal utility decreases. If commodity consumption continues to rise, the marginal utility will eventually reach zero, and the total utility will be at its maximum. Beyond that point, any further increase in commodity consumption leads to negative marginal utility, which represents dissatisfaction. For example, beyond some point, further doses of antibiotics would kill no pathogens at all and might even become harmful to the body. In some circumstances, however, the marginal utility of a good or service might be increasing, as with, for example, dosages of antibiotics, where having too few pills would leave bacteria with greater resistance, but a full supply could effect a cure.

Diminishing marginal utility is traditionally a microeconomic concept and often holds for an individual, however there are instances where marginal utility can increase on a macroeconomic level. For instance, offering a service may only be feasible if it is accessible to the majority or all of the population. At the point where this becomes a reality, the marginal utility of the raw material required to provide the service will increase significantly.

== Marginalist theory ==
Marginalism is an economic theory and method of analysis that suggests that individuals make economic decisions by weighing the benefits of consuming an additional unit of a good or service against the cost of acquiring it. In other words, value is determined by the additional utility of satisfaction provided by each extra unit consumed.

=== Market price and diminishing marginal utility ===
If a person has a good or service that has less value to them compared to another good or service they could trade it for, it would be beneficial for them to make that trade. The marginal gains or losses from further trades will vary as items are exchanged. If the marginal utility of one item is decreasing while the other is not increasing, then the individual will demand a greater amount of the item they're acquiring in comparison to the one they're giving up. However, if the two items complement each other, then the exchange ratios might remain constant. In situations where traders can improve their position by offering trades that are more favorable to complementary traders, they are likely to do so.

In an economy that uses money, the marginal utility of a given quantity of money is equivalent to the marginal utility of the best good or service that could be purchased with that money. This concept is helpful for explaining the principles of supply and demand, and is essential aspects of models of imperfect competition.

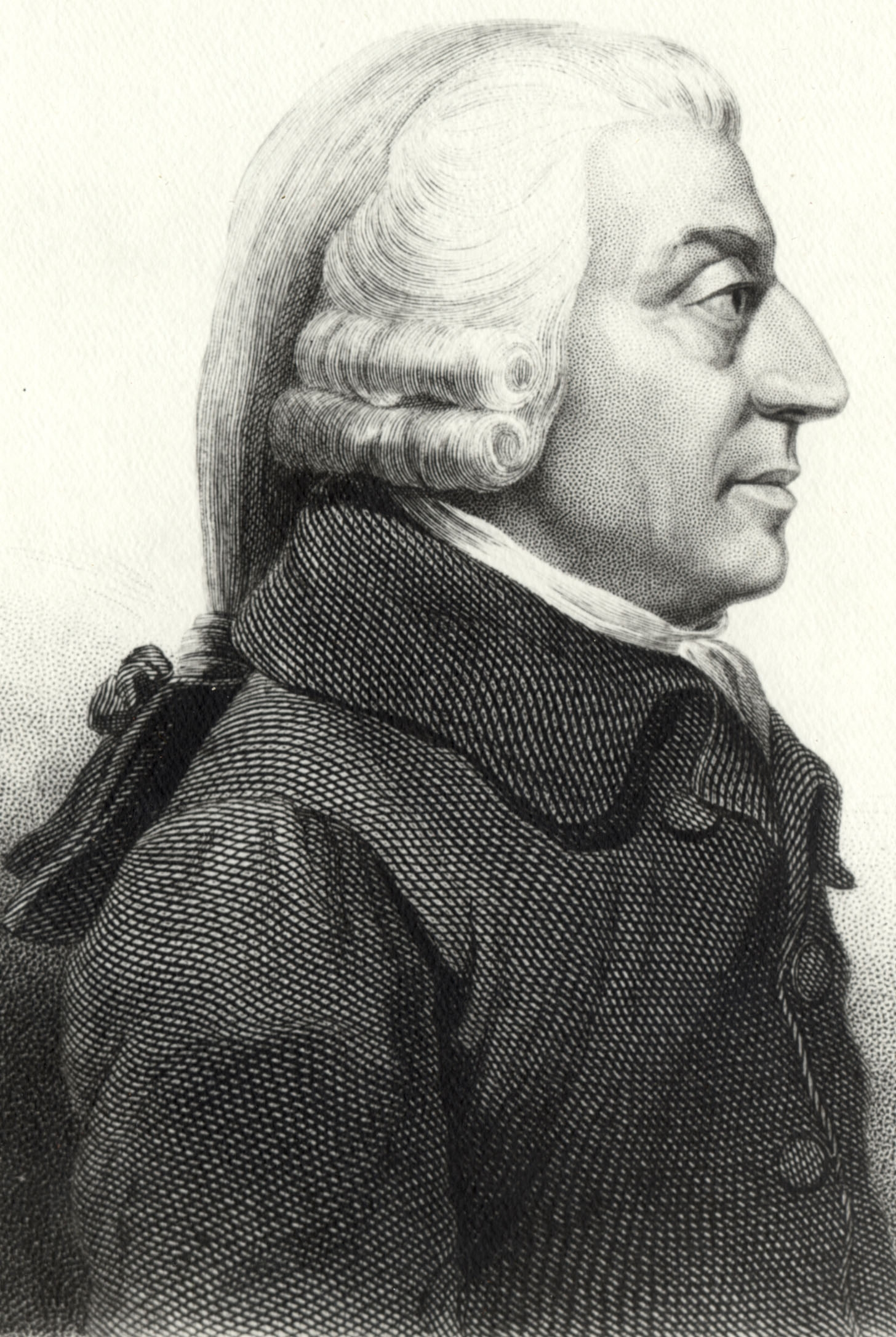
Adam Smith

==== Paradox of water and diamonds ====
The "paradox of water and diamonds" is most commonly associated with Adam Smith, though it was recognized by earlier thinkers. The apparent contradiction lies in the fact that water possesses a lower economic value than diamonds, even though water is far more vital to human existence. Smith suggested that there was an irrational divide between the 'use value' of something and the 'exchange value'. The things which have the greatest value in use frequently have little or no value in exchange; and likewise, things which have the greatest value in exchange have frequently little or no value in use. Nothing is more useful than water: but it will purchase scarcely anything. A diamond has hardly any practical value in use, but a great quantity of other goods may be purchased in exchange for it.

Price is determined by both marginal utility and marginal cost, and here is the key to the apparent paradox. The marginal cost of water is lower than the marginal cost of diamonds. That is not to say that the price of any good or service is simply a function of the marginal utility that it has for any one individual or for some ostensibly typical individual. Rather, individuals are willing to trade based upon the respective marginal utilities of the goods that they have or desire (with these marginal utilities being distinct for each potential trader), and prices thus develop constrains by these marginal utilities.

=== Marginalism limitations ===
Marginalism has many limitations and economic theories. Some scholars, such as Warren J. Samuels, have raised concerns that individuals may not always behave as portrayed in marginalist theories, highlighting complexities in human decision-making that go beyond simple optimizing behavior. Additionally, utility is difficult to quantify precisely, as it varies significantly from person to person and may not be stable over time. Another limitation lies in measuring the marginal change: while monetary values can be straightforward to track, gauging the utility derived from non-monetary goods like food is more challenging, as individual preferences and the wide range of alternatives complicate accuracy.

== Quantified marginal utility ==
Under the special case in which usefulness can be quantified, the change in utility of moving from state $S_1$ to state $S_2$ is

$$\Delta U = U(S_2) - U(S_1).$$

Moreover, if $S_1$ and $S_2$ are distinguishable by values of just one variable $g,$ which is itself quantified, then it becomes possible to speak of the ratio of the marginal utility of the change in $g$ to the size of that change:

Diminishing marginal utility, given quantification

$$\left.\frac{\Delta U}{\Delta g}\right|_\text{c.p.},$$

where "c.p." indicates that the only independent variable to change is $g.$

Mainstream neoclassical economics will typically assume that the limit

$$\lim_{\Delta g\to 0} \left.\frac{\Delta U}{\Delta g}\right|_\text{c.p.}$$

exists, and use "marginal utility" to refer to the partial derivative

$$\frac{\partial U}{\partial g} = \lim_{\Delta g\to 0}\left.\frac{\Delta U}{\Delta g}\right|_\text{c.p.}.$$

Accordingly, diminishing marginal utility corresponds to the condition

$$\frac{\partial^2 U}{\partial g^2} < 0.$$

== History ==
Economists sought to explain how prices are determined, and in this pursuit, they developed the concept of marginal utility. The term "marginal utility", credited to the Austrian economist Friedrich von Wieser by Alfred Marshall, was a translation of Wieser's term Grenznutzen ("border-use").

=== Proto-marginalist approaches ===
Perhaps the essence of a notion of diminishing marginal utility can be found in Aristotle's Politics, wherein he writes

External goods have a limit, like any other instrument, and all things useful are of such a nature that where there is too much of them they must either do harm, or at any rate be of no use.

There has been marked disagreement about the development and role of marginal considerations in Aristotle's value theory.

Numerous economists have established a connection between utility and rarity, which influences economic decisions and price determination. Diamonds are priced higher than water because their marginal utility is higher than water.

Eighteenth-century Italian mercantilists, such as Antonio Genovesi, Giammaria Ortes, Pietro Verri, Marchese Cesare di Beccaria, and Count Giovanni Rinaldo Carli, held that value was explained in terms of the general utility and of scarcity, though they did not typically work out a theory of how these interacted. In Della moneta (1751), Abbé Ferdinando Galiani, a pupil of Genovesi, attempted to explain value as a ratio of two ratios, utility and scarcity, with the latter component ratio being the ratio of quantity to use.

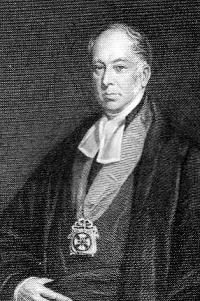
Richard Whately

Anne Robert Jacques Turgot, in Réflexions sur la formation et la distribution de richesse (1769), held that value derived from the general utility of the class to which a good belonged, from comparison of present and future wants, and from anticipated difficulties in procurement.

Like the Italian mercantilists, Étienne Bonnot, Abbé de Condillac, saw value as determined by utility associated with the class to which the good belong, and by estimated scarcity. In De commerce et le gouvernement (1776), Condillac emphasized that value is not based upon cost but that costs were paid because of value.

This last point was famously restated by the Nineteenth Century proto-marginalist, Richard Whately, who in Introductory Lectures on Political Economy (1832) wrote:

It is not that pearls fetch a high price because men have dived for them; but on the contrary, men dive for them because they fetch a high price.

(Whatley's student Senior is noted below as an early marginalist.)

=== Marginalists before the Revolution ===
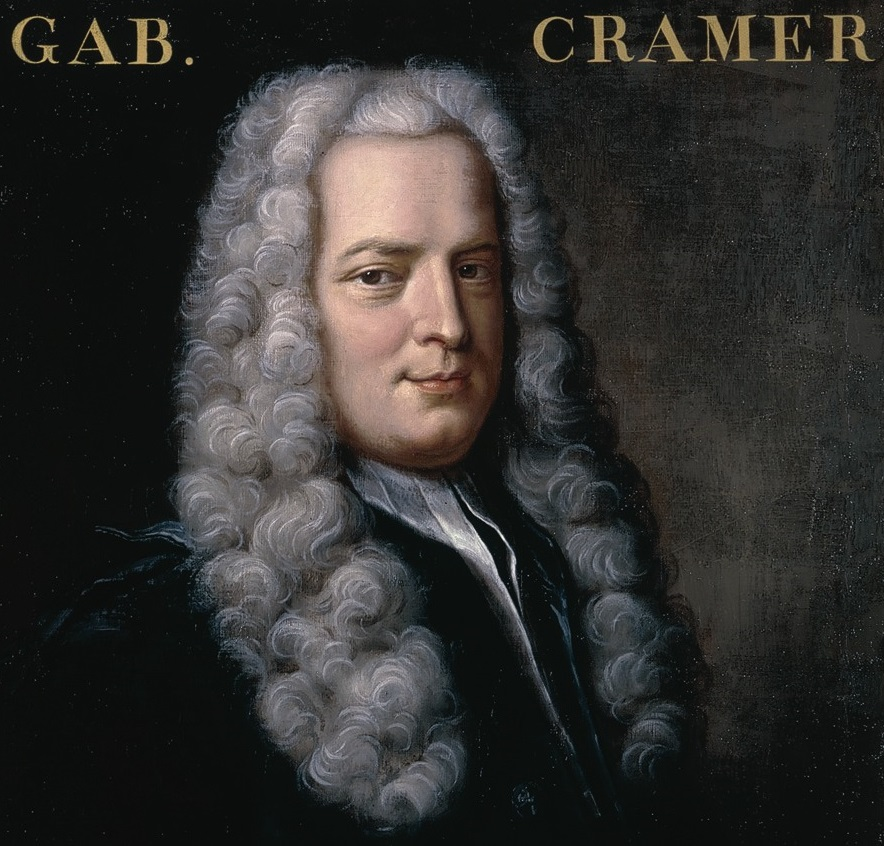
Gabriel Cramer

Daniel Bernoulli, is credited with publishing the first clear statement on the theory of marginal utility in his paper "Specimen theoriae novae de mensura sortis", which was released in 1738, although he had drafted it in 1731 or 1732. Gabriel Cramer had developed a similar theory in a private letter in 1728, aimed at resolving the St. Petersburg paradox. Both Bernoulli and Cramer concluded that the desirability of money decreases as it accumulates, with the natural logarithm (Bernoulli) or square root (Cramer) serving as the measure of a sum's desirability. However, the broader implications of this hypothesis were not explored, and the work faded into obscurity.

In "A Lecture on the Notion of Value as Distinguished Not Only from Utility, but also from Value in Exchange", delivered in 1833 and included in Lectures on Population, Value, Poor Laws and Rent (1837), William Forster Lloyd explicitly offered a general marginal utility theory, but did not offer its derivation nor elaborate its implications. The importance of his statement seems to have been lost on everyone (including Lloyd) until the early 20th century, by which time others had independently developed and popularized the same insight.

In An Outline of the Science of Political Economy (1836), Nassau William Senior asserted that marginal utilities were the ultimate determinant of demand, yet apparently did not pursue implications, though some interpret his work as indeed doing just that.

In "De la mesure de l'utilité des travaux publics" (1844), Jules Dupuit applied a conception of marginal utility to the problem of determining bridge tolls.

In 1854, Hermann Heinrich Gossen published Die Entwicklung der Gesetze des menschlichen Verkehrs und der daraus fließenden Regeln für menschliches Handeln, which presented a marginal utility theory and to a very large extent worked-out its implications for the behavior of a market economy. However, Gossen's work was not well received in the Germany of his time, most copies were destroyed unsold, and he was virtually forgotten until rediscovered after the so-called Marginal Revolution.

=== Marginal Revolution ===
Marginalism eventually found a foothold by way of the work of three economists, Jevons in England, Menger in Austria, and Walras in Switzerland.

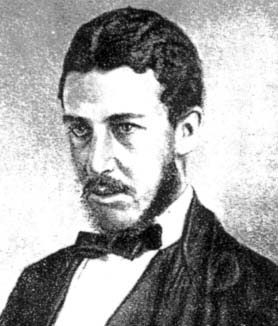
William Stanley Jevons

William Stanley Jevons first proposed the theory in "A General Mathematical Theory of Political Economy", a paper presented in 1862 and published in 1863, followed by a series of works culminating in his book The Theory of Political Economy in 1871 that established his reputation as a leading political economist and logician of the time. Jevons' conception of utility was in the utilitarian tradition of Jeremy Bentham and of John Stuart Mill, but he differed from his classical predecessors in emphasizing that "value depends entirely upon utility", in particular, on "final utility upon which the theory of Economics will be found to turn." He later qualified this in deriving the result that in a model of exchange equilibrium, price ratios would be proportional not only to ratios of "final degrees of utility", but also to costs of production.

Carl Menger presented the theory in Grundsätze der Volkswirtschaftslehre (translated as Principles of Economics) in 1871. Menger's presentation is peculiarly notable on two points. First, he took special pains to explain why individuals should be expected to rank possible uses and then to use marginal utility to decide amongst trade-offs. (For this reason, Menger and his followers are sometimes called the Psychological School, though they are more frequently known as the Austrian School or as the Vienna School.) Second, while his illustrative examples present utility as quantified, his essential assumptions do not. (Menger in fact crossed-out the numerical tables in his own copy of the published Grundsätze.) Menger also developed the law of diminishing marginal utility. Menger's work found a significant and appreciative audience.

Marie-Esprit-Léon Walras introduced the theory in Éléments d'économie politique pure, the first part of which was published in 1874 in a relatively mathematical exposition. Walras's work found relatively few readers at the time but was recognized and incorporated two decades later in the work of Pareto and Barone.

An American, John Bates Clark, is sometimes also mentioned. But, while Clark independently arrived at a marginal utility theory, he did little to advance it until it was clear that the followers of Jevons, Menger, and Walras were revolutionizing economics. Nonetheless, his contributions thereafter were profound.

==== Second generation ====
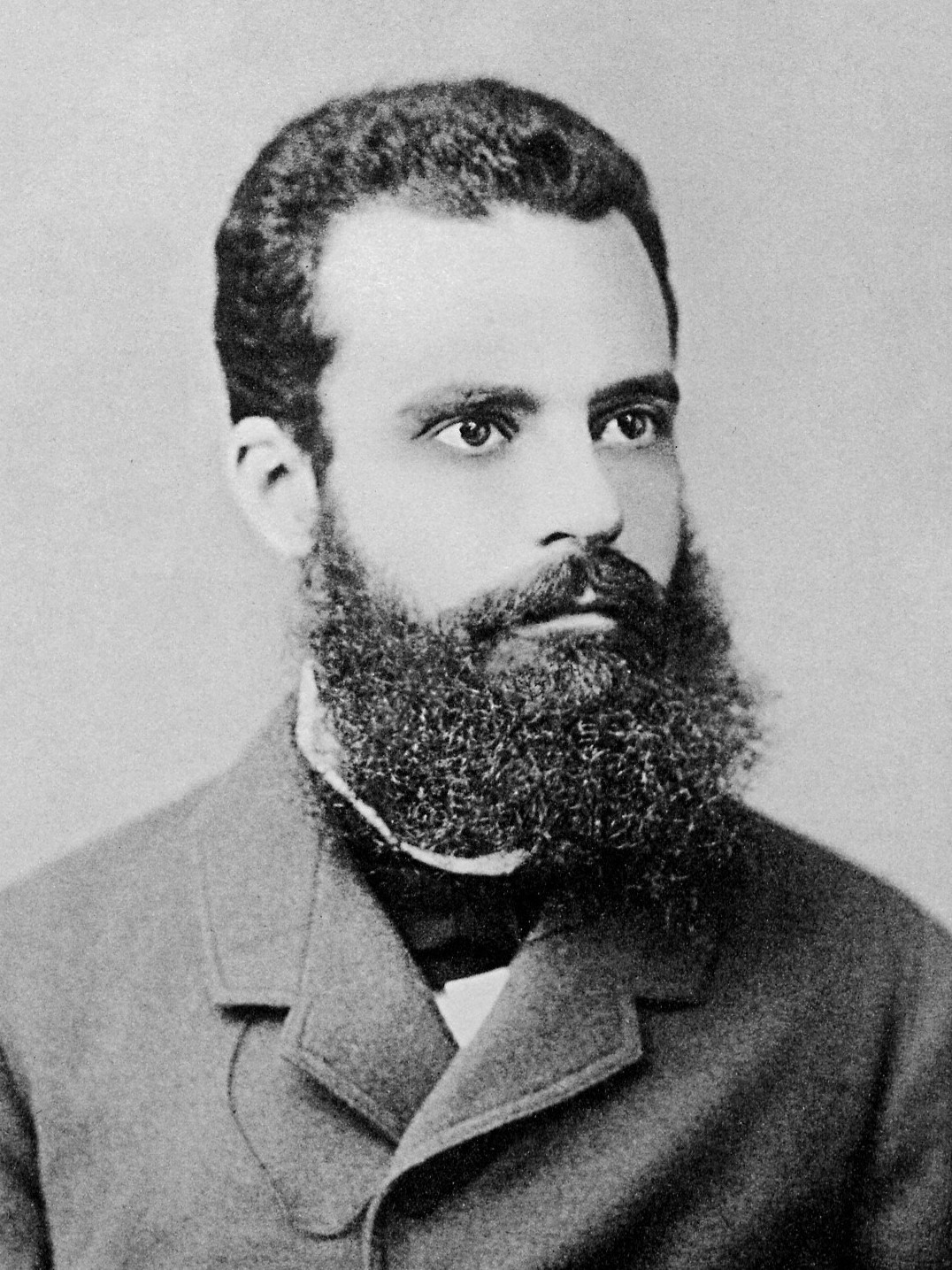
Vilfredo Pareto

Although the Marginal Revolution flowed from the work of Jevons, Menger, and Walras, their work might have failed to enter the mainstream were it not for a second generation of economists. In England, the second generation were exemplified by Philip Henry Wicksteed, by William Smart, and by Alfred Marshall; in Austria by Eugen von Böhm-Bawerk and by Friedrich von Wieser; in Switzerland by Vilfredo Pareto; and in America by Herbert Joseph Davenport and by Frank A. Fetter.

While the approaches of Jevons, Menger, and Walras had notable differences, the second generation of economists did not maintain these distinctions based on national or linguistic boundaries. Von Wieser's work was significantly influenced by Walras, while Wicksteed was strongly influenced by Menger. Fetter and Davenport identified themselves as part of the "American Psychological School", named after the "Austrian Psychological School", while Clark's work during this period was also heavily influenced by Menger. William Smart initially served as a conduit for Austrian School ideas to English-speaking readers but gradually came under the sway of Marshall's ideas.

Böhm-Bawerk was perhaps the most able expositor of Menger's conception. He was further noted for producing a theory of interest and of profit in equilibrium based upon the interaction of diminishing marginal utility with diminishing marginal productivity of time and with time preference. This theory was adopted in full and then further developed by Knut Wicksell and with modifications including formal disregard for time-preference by Wicksell's American rival Irving Fisher.

Marshall was the second-generation marginalist whose work on marginal utility came most to inform the mainstream of neoclassical economics, especially by way of his Principles of Economics, the first volume of which was published in 1890. Marshall constructed the demand curve with the aid of assumptions that utility was quantified, and that the marginal utility of money was constant (or nearly so). Like Jevons, Marshall did not see an explanation for supply in the theory of marginal utility, so he synthesized an explanation of demand thus explained with supply explained in a more classical manner, determined by costs which were taken to be objectively determined. Marshall later actively mischaracterized the criticism that these costs were themselves ultimately determined by marginal utilities.

==== Marginal Revolution and Marxism ====
Karl Marx acknowledged that "nothing can have value, without being an object of utility", but in his analysis "use-value as such lies outside the sphere of investigation of political economy", with labor being the principal determinant of value under capitalism.

Ernesto Screpanti and Stefano Zamagni interpret the doctrines of marginalism and the Marginal Revolution as a response to Marxist economics. However, this view is somewhat flawed, as the first volume of Das Kapital was not published until July 1867, which was after the works of Jevons, Menger, and Walras had either been written or were under way (Walras published Éléments d'économie politique pure in 1874 and Carl Menger published Principles of Economics in 1871); Marx was still a relatively minor figure when these works were completed and it is unlikely that any of these economists knew anything about him. Some scholars, such as Friedrich Hayek and W. W. Bartley III, have speculated that Marx may have come across the works of one or more of these economists while reading at the British Museum.

Despite the fact the Marxist economics was not an immediate target for the marginalists, it is possible to argue that the new generation of economists succeeded partly because they were able to provide simple responses to Marxist economic theory. One of the best known responses was Böhm-Bawerk, Zum Abschluss des Marxschen Systems (1896), but the first response was actually Wicksteed's "The Marxian Theory of Value. Das Kapital: A Criticism" (1884), followed by "The Jevonian Criticism of Marx: A Rejoinder" in 1885. At first, there were only a few Marxist responses to marginalism, including Rudolf Hilferding's Böhm-Bawerks Marx-Kritik (1904) and Politicheskoy ekonomii rante (1914) by Nikolai Bukharin. However, over the course of the 20th century, a significant body of literature emerged on the conflict between marginalism and labour theory of value. One important critique of marginalism came from neo-Ricardian economist Piero Sraffa.

Followers of Henry George's ideas such as Mason Gaffney view marginalism and neoclassical economics as a response to Progress and Poverty, which was published in 1879.

In the 1980s John Roemer and other analytical Marxists have worked to rebuild Marxian theses on a marginalist foundation.

=== Reformulation ===
In his 1881 work Mathematical Psychics, Francis Ysidro Edgeworth presented the indifference curve, deriving its properties from marginalist theory which assumed utility to be a differentiable function of quantified goods and services. Later work attempted to generalize to the indifference curve formulations of utility and marginal utility in avoiding unobservable measures of utility.

In 1915, Eugen Slutsky derived a theory of consumer choice solely from properties of indifference curves. Because of the World War, the Bolshevik Revolution, and his own subsequent loss of interest, Slutsky's work drew almost no notice, but similar work in 1934 by John Richard Hicks and R. G. D. Allen derived largely the same results and found a significant audience. (Allen subsequently drew attention to Slutsky's earlier accomplishment.)

Although some of the third generation of Austrian School economists had by 1911 rejected the quantification of utility while continuing to think in terms of marginal utility, most economists presumed that utility must be a sort of quantity. Indifference curve analysis seemed to represent a way to dispense with presumptions of quantification, albeit that a seemingly arbitrary assumption (admitted by Hicks to be a "rabbit out of a hat") about decreasing marginal rates of substitution would then have to be introduced to have convexity of indifference curves.

For those who accepted that indifference curve analysis superseded earlier marginal utility analysis, the latter became at best perhaps pedagogically useful, but "old fashioned" and observationally unnecessary.

=== Revival ===
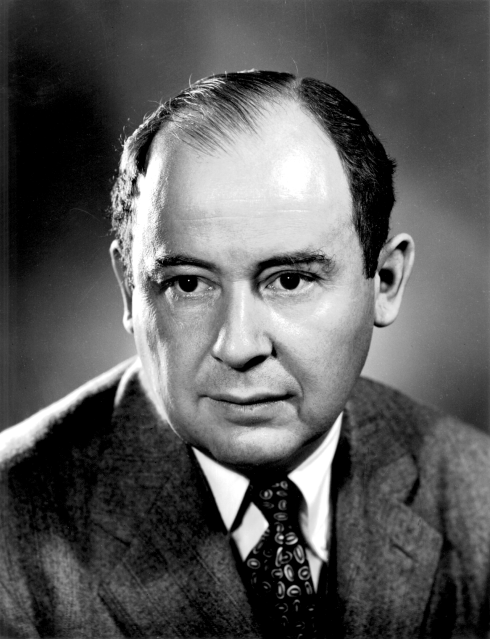
John von Neumann

When Cramer and Bernoulli introduced the notion of diminishing marginal utility, it had been to address a paradox of gambling, rather than the paradox of value. The marginalists of the revolution, however, had been formally concerned with problems in which there was neither risk nor uncertainty. So too with the indifference curve analysis of Slutsky, Hicks, and Allen.

The expected utility hypothesis of Bernoulli and others was revived by various 20th century thinkers, with early contributions by Ramsey (1926), von Neumann and Morgenstern (1944), and Savage (1954). Although this hypothesis remains controversial, it brings not only utility, but a quantified conception of utility (cardinal utility), back into the mainstream of economic thought.

A major reason why quantified models of utility are influential today is that risk and uncertainty have been recognized as central topics in contemporary economic theory. Quantified utility models provide a simplified approach to analysing risky decision by establishing a link between diminishing marginal utility and risk aversion. In fact, many contemporary analyses of saving and portfolio choice require stronger assumptions than diminishing marginal utility, such as the assumption of prudence, which means convex marginal utility.

Meanwhile, the Austrian School continued to develop its ordinalist notions of marginal utility analysis, formally demonstrating that from them proceed the decreasing marginal rates of substitution of indifference curves.

== See also ==
- Diminishing returns
- Subjective theory of value
- Marginalism
- Microeconomics
- Paradox of value
- Pareto efficiency
- Rivalry (economics)
- Satisfaction paradox
- Shadow price
- Theory of value (economics)
- Utility
