= List of Austrian-school economists =

This is a list of notable economists aligned with the Austrian school who are sometimes colloquially called "the Austrians". This designation applies even though few hold Austrian citizenship; moreover, not all economists from Austria subscribe to the ideas of the Austrian school.

== Austrian economists ==
Image	Name	Year of birth	Year of death	Nationality	Academic institution	Notes
	Carl Menger	1840	1921	Austrian	University of Vienna	Founder of the Austrian School of economics.
	Eugen von Böhm-Bawerk	1851	1914	Austrian	University of Vienna	
	Friedrich von Wieser	1851	1926	Austrian	University of Vienna	
	William Smart	1853	1915	Scottish	University of Glasgow	
	Herbert J. Davenport	1861	1931	American	University of Chicago; University of Missouri	Member of the "American Psychological School".
	Frank Fetter	1863	1949	American	Indiana University; Stanford University; Cornell University; Princeton University	Member of the "American Psychological School". President of the American Economic Association.
	Ludwig von Mises	1881	1973	Austrian	University of Vienna; Geneva Graduate Institute; New York University	
	Benjamin Anderson	1886	1949	American	Columbia University; Harvard University; UCLA	Worked for NBC and Chase National Bank.
	Richard Ritter von Strigl	1891	1942	Austrian	University of Vienna	Official at the Austrian Unemployment Insurance Board.
	Henry Hazlitt	1894	1993	American	none	Worked as a journalist for publications including The Wall Street Journal, The Nation, The American Mercury, Newsweek, and The New York Times.
	Frederick Nymeyer	1897	1981	American	none	Industrialist and author.
	Friedrich Hayek	1899	1992	Austrian	London School of Economics; University of Chicago; University of Freiburg; University of Salzburg	Shared the Nobel Memorial Prize in Economic Sciences in 1974.
	Wilhelm Röpke	1899	1966	German	University of Marburg; Istanbul University; Geneva Graduate Institute	
	William Harold Hutt	1899	1988	British	University of Cape Town	
	Gottfried von Haberler	1900	1995	Austrian-American	Harvard University	
	Oskar Morgenstern	1902	1977	German-American	University of Vienna; Princeton University; New York University	
	Fritz Machlup	1902	1983	Austrian-American	University at Buffalo; Johns Hopkins University; Princeton University; New York University	
	Paul Rosenstein-Rodan	1902	1985	Polish	University College London; London School of Economics; MIT	Worked at the World Bank.
	Ludwig Lachmann	1906	1990	German	University of Hull; Wits University	
	William H. Peterson	1921	2012	American	New York University	
	Hans Sennholz	1922	2007	German-American	Iona College; Grove City College	Worked for the Foundation for Economic Education.
	Leland B. Yeager	1924	2018	American	Auburn University; University of Virginia	
	Murray Rothbard	1926	1995	American	Brooklyn Polytechnic; UNLV	A founder of the Cato Institute and of the Mises Institute.
	Israel Kirzner	1930	Living	American	New York University	
	Ernest C. Pasour	1932	Living	American	NC State	
	Ralph Raico	1936	2016	American	Buffalo State University	
	George Reisman	1937	Living	American	Pepperdine University	
	Pascal Salin	1939	Living	French	Paris Dauphine University	
	Walter Block	1941	Living	American	Columbia University	
	Gary North	1942	2022	American	none	
	Robert Higgs	1944	Living	American	University of Washington; Lafayette College; Seattle University	
	Roger Garrison	1944	2026	American	Auburn University	
	Mark Skousen	1947	Living	American	Chapman University	
	David Gordon	1948	Living	American	UCLA	Scholar at the Cato Institute and the Mises Institute.
	Mario J. Rizzo	1948	alive	American	New York University	
	Hans-Hermann Hoppe	1949	Living	German-American	UNLV	Founder of the Property and Freedom Society.
	Joseph Salerno	1950	Living	American	Pace University	Academic Vice President of the Mises Institute.
	Randall G. Holcombe	1950	Living	American	Florida State University	
	Richard Ebeling	1950	Living	American	University College Cork; University of Dallas; Hillsdale College	
	Don Lavoie	1951	2001	American	George Mason University	
	Lawrence Reed	1953	Living	American	Northwood University	Founder of the Mackinac Center for Public Policy and Foundation for Economic Education.
	Jesús Huerta de Soto	1956	Living	Spanish	King Juan Carlos University	
	Donald J. Boudreaux	1958	Living	American	George Mason University	
	Mark Thornton	1960	Living	American	Auburn University	
	Peter Boettke	1960	Living	American	George Mason University	Vice president for research of the Mercatus Center
	David Prychitko	1962	Living	American	Northern Michigan University	
	Steven Horwitz	1964	2021	American	Ball State University; St. Lawrence University	
	Peter G. Klein	1966	Living	American	UC Berkeley; University of Georgia; University of Missouri; Baylor University	
	Jörg Guido Hülsmann	1966	Living	German-French	Panthéon-Assas University; University at Buffalo; University of Angers	Fellowship at the Mises Institute from 2000 to 2004.
	Robert P. Murphy	1976	Living	American	Hillsdale College; New York University	
	Christopher Coyne	1977	Living	American	George Mason University	
	Benjamin Powell	1978	Living	American	Texas Tech	
	Philipp Bagus	1980	Living	German-Spanish	Universidad Rey Juan Carlos	

== Related lists ==
- List of economists
- List of liberal theorists
