= Rent-seeking =

Growing one's existing wealth without creating new wealth

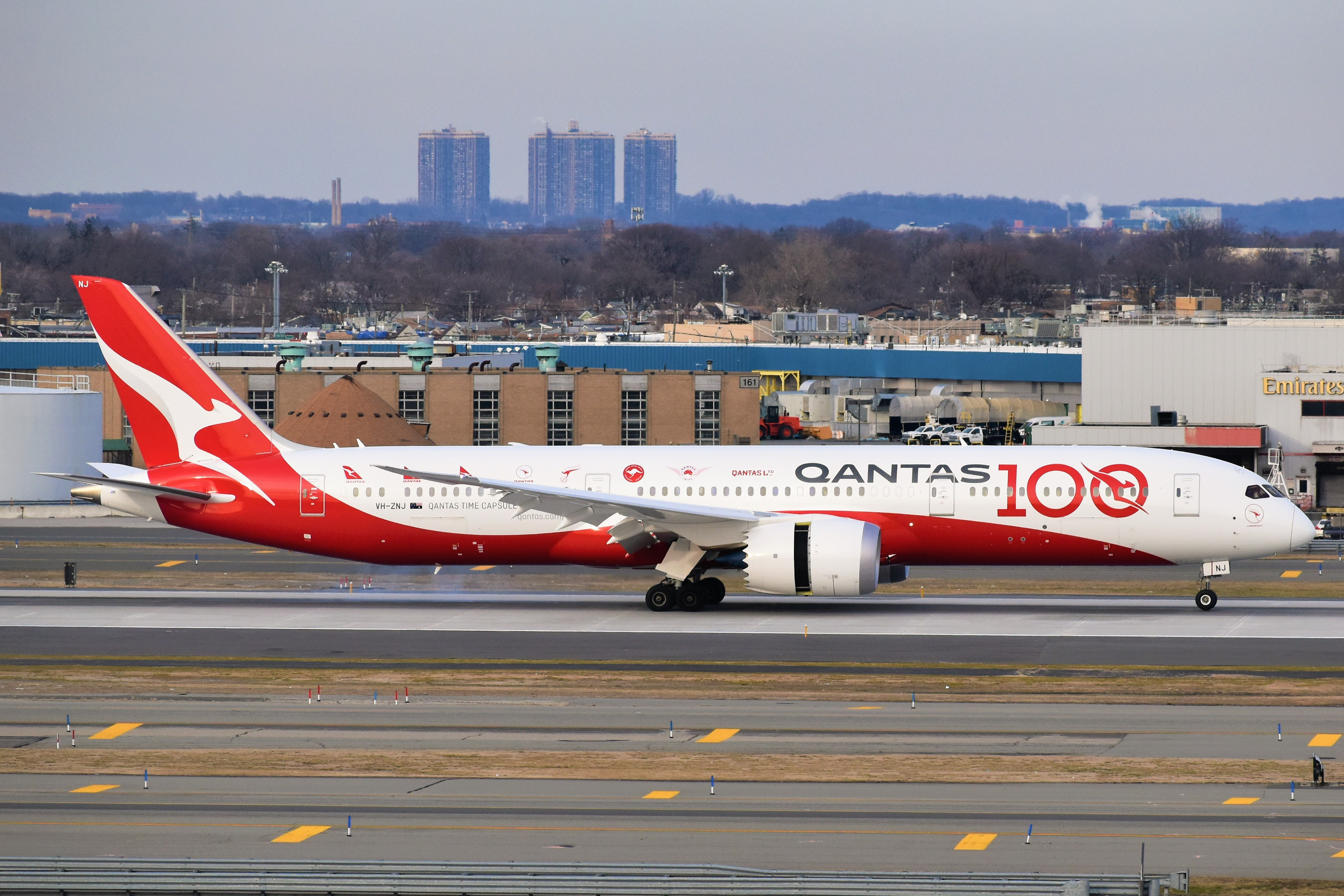
Chris Berg argues that the requests by airline company Qantas for subsidies from the Australian government can be seen as an example of rent-seeking by this firm.

Rent-seeking is the act of growing one's existing wealth by manipulating public policy or economic conditions without creating new wealth. Rent-seeking activities have negative effects on the rest of society. They lead to reduced economic efficiency due to misallocation of resources, stifled competition, lower wealth creation, a loss of government revenue, increased income inequality, increased debt levels, the risk of increased corruption and cronyism, the decline in public trust in institutions, and potential socioeconomic and institutional decline.

Successful capture of regulatory agencies (if any) to gain a coercive monopoly can result in advantages for rent-seekers in a market while imposing disadvantages on their uncorrupt competitors. This is one of many possible forms of rent-seeking behavior.

The classic example of rent-seeking, according to Robert Shiller, is that of a property owner who installs a chain across a river that flows through their land and then hires a collector to charge passing boats a fee to lower the chain. There is nothing productive about the chain or the collector, nor do passing boats get anything in return. The owner has made no improvements to the river and is not adding value in any way, directly or indirectly, except for themselves.

An example of rent-seeking in a modern economy is spending money on lobbying to obtain government subsidies or a share of wealth that has already been created, or to impose regulations on competitors in order to increase one's own market share.

== Theory ==
The term "rent", in the narrow sense of land rent, was used by the British 19th-century economist David Ricardo, but rent-seeking only became the subject of durable interest among economists and political scientists more than a century later after the publication of two influential papers on the topic by Gordon Tullock in 1967, and Anne Krueger in 1974. The word "rent" in the context of "rent-seeking" does not refer specifically to payment on a lease but rather to Adam Smith's division of incomes into profit, wage, and economic rent. The origin of the term refers to gaining control of land or other natural resources.

=== Georgist ===
Georgist economic theory describes rent-seeking in terms of land rent, where the value of land largely comes from the natural resources native to the land, as well as from collectively paid-for services, such as state schools, law enforcement, fire prevention, and mitigation services. Rent seeking, according to the Georgist, does not include those persons who have invested substantial capital improvements in a piece of land, but rather those who perform their role as mere titleholders.

=== Relation to profit-seeking ===
Rent-seeking is distinguished in theory from profit-seeking, in which entities seek to extract value by engaging in mutually beneficial transactions. Profit-seeking in this sense is the creation of wealth, while rent-seeking is "profiteering" by using social institutions, such as but not limited to the power of the state, to redistribute wealth among different groups without creating new wealth. In a practical context, income obtained through rent-seeking may contribute to profits in the standard, accounting sense of the word.

"Rent-seeking" is an attempt to obtain economic rent (i.e., the portion of income paid to a factor of production in excess of what is needed to keep it employed in its current use) by manipulating the social or political environment in which economic activities occur, rather than by creating new wealth. Rent-seeking implies the extraction of uncompensated value from others without making any contribution to productivity.

=== Tullock paradox ===
The Tullock paradox is the apparent paradox, described by economist Gordon Tullock, on the low costs of rent-seeking relative to the gains from rent-seeking.

The paradox is that rent-seekers wanting political favors can bribe politicians at a cost much lower than the value of the favor to the rent-seeker. For instance, a rent seeker who hopes to gain a billion dollars from a particular political policy may need to bribe politicians with merely ten million dollars, which is about 1% of the gain to the rent seeker. Luigi Zingales frames it by asking, "Why is there so little money in politics?" because a naïve model of political bribery and/or campaign spending should result in beneficiaries of government subsidies being willing to spend an amount approaching the value of the profits derived from the subsidies themselves, when in fact only a small fraction of that is spent.

Several possible explanations have been offered for the Tullock paradox:

1. Voters may punish politicians who take large bribes or live lavish lifestyles. This makes it hard for politicians to demand large bribes from rent-seekers.
2. Competition between different politicians eager to offer favors to rent-seekers may bid down the cost of rent-seeking.
3. Lack of trust between the rent-seekers and the politicians, due to the inherently underhanded nature of the deal and the unavailability of both legal recourse and reputational incentives to enforce compliance, pushes down the price that politicians can demand for favors.
4. Rent-seekers can use a small part of the benefit gained to make contributions to the politicians who provided enabling legislation.

=== Regulatory capture ===
Regulatory capture is a related term for the collusion between firms and the government agencies assigned to regulate them, which is seen as enabling extensive rent-seeking behavior, especially when the government agency must rely on the firms for knowledge about the market. Studies of rent-seeking focus on efforts to capture special monopoly privileges such as manipulating government regulation of free enterprise competition. The term monopoly privilege rent-seeking is an often-used label for this particular type of rent-seeking. Often-cited examples include a lobby that seeks economic regulations such as tariff protection, quotas, subsidies, or extension of copyright law. Anne Krueger concludes that "empirical evidence suggests that the value of rents associated with import licenses can be relatively large, and it has been shown that the welfare cost of quantitative restrictions equals that of their tariff equivalents plus the value of the rents".

=== Incentives ===
A 2013 study by the World Bank showed that the incentives for policy-makers to engage in rent-provision is conditional on the institutional incentives they face, with elected officials in stable high-income democracies the least likely to indulge in such activities vis-à-vis entrenched bureaucrats and/or their counterparts in young and quasi-democracies.

==== Moral hazard ====
From a theoretical standpoint, the moral hazard of rent-seeking can be considerable. If "buying" a favorable regulatory environment seems cheaper than building more efficient production, a firm may choose the former option, reaping incomes entirely unrelated to any contribution to total wealth or well-being. This results in a sub-optimal allocation of resources – money spent on lobbyists and counter-lobbyists rather than on research and development, on improved business practices, on employee training, or on additional capital goods – which slows economic growth. Claims that a firm is rent-seeking, therefore, often accompany allegations of government corruption, or the undue influence of special interests.

==== Illegal ====
Some rent-seeking behaviors, such as the forming of cartels or the bribing of politicians, are illegal in many market-driven economies.

=== Economic effects ===
Rent-seeking can prove costly to economic growth; high rent-seeking activity makes rent-seeking more attractive due to the natural and growing returns that result from it. Thus, organizations value rent-seeking over productivity. In this case, there are very high levels of rent-seeking, accompanied by very low levels of output. Rent-seeking may grow at the cost of economic growth because rent-seeking by the state can easily hurt innovation. Ultimately, public rent-seeking hurts the economy the most because innovation drives economic growth.

Government agents may initiate rent-seeking, as by soliciting bribes or other favors from the individuals or firms that stand to gain from having special economic privileges, which opens up the possibility of exploitation of the consumer. It has been shown that rent-seeking by bureaucracy can push up the cost of production of public goods. It has also been shown that rent-seeking by tax officials may cause a loss in revenue to the public exchequer.

Mancur Olson traced the historic consequences of rent seeking in The Rise and Decline of Nations. As a country becomes increasingly dominated by organized interest groups, it loses economic vitality and falls into decline. Olson argued that countries that have a collapse of the political regime and the interest groups that have coalesced around it can radically improve productivity and increase national income because they start with a clean slate in the aftermath of the collapse. An example of this is Japan after World War II. But new coalitions form over time, once again shackling society to redistribute wealth and income to themselves. However, social and technological changes have enabled the emergence of new enterprises and groups.

A study by Laband and John Sophocleus in 1988 estimated that rent-seeking had decreased total income in the US by 45 percent. Both Dougan and Tullock acknowledge the difficulty in determining the cost of rent-seeking. Rent-seekers of government-provided benefits will, in turn, spend up to that amount of benefit to gain those benefits, in the absence of, for example, the collective-action constraints highlighted by Olson. Similarly, taxpayers lobby for loopholes and will spend the value of those loopholes, again, to obtain those loopholes (again, absent collective-action constraints). The total of wastes from rent-seeking is then the total amount from the government-provided benefits and instances of tax avoidance (valuing benefits and avoided taxes at zero). Dougan says that the "total rent-seeking costs equal the sum of aggregate current income plus the net deficit of the public sector".

Mark Gradstein writes about rent-seeking in the context of public goods provision, stating that public goods are determined by rent-seeking or lobbying activities. But the question is whether private provision with free-riding incentives or public provision with rent-seeking incentives is more inefficient in its allocation.

Political rent-seeking can also affect immigration. Welfare states incentivize unproductive migration and can perpetuate past behaviors of not accumulating personal wealth and being dependent on government transfers. Alternatively, productive migrants are incentivised to leave rent-seeking societies, possibly resulting in further economic decline.

The Nobel Memorial Prize-winning economist Joseph Stiglitz has argued that rent-seeking contributes significantly to income inequality in the United States through lobbying for government policies that let the wealthy and powerful get income, not as a reward for creating wealth, but by grabbing a larger share of the wealth that would otherwise have been produced without their effort. Thomas Piketty, Emmanuel Saez, and Stefanie Stantcheva have analyzed international economies and their changes in tax rates to conclude that much of income inequality is a result of rent-seeking among wealthy taxpayers.

Laband and John Sophocleus suggest that the lack of empirical evidence on rent-seeking is due to the broad scope of rent-seeking and rent avoidance activities. Additionally, they suggest that many economic performance measures, such as Gross Domestic Product, include goods and services that are part of the rent-seeking process.

In 2023, Angus Deaton wrote:

In retrospect it is not so surprising that free markets, or at least free markets with a government that permits and encourages rent seeking by the rich, should produce not equality but an extractive elite that predates on the population at large. Utopian rhetoric about freedom has led to an unjust social dystopia, not for the first time. Free markets with rent seekers are not the same as competitive markets; indeed, they are often exactly the opposite.

In some cases, rent-seeking can provide a net positive for an economy. Shannon K. Mitchell's article "The Welfare Effects of Rent-Saving and Rent-Seeking" provides an example of this through a model of rent-seeking, where firms need to expand to obtain their exporting rents.

=== Criticism of theories ===
In the 1980s, critiques of rent-seeking theory began to emerge, questioning the ambiguity of the concept of "wasted resources" and the reliability of the assumptions being made from it. Samuels argues that productivity is defined by rent-seeking theorists as a strictly physical property but ignores the rights that surround and define the product. He further asserts that rent-seeking theorists ignore a fundamental principle of being economic actors: that we live in markets of scarce resources and it is how we use these resources which drives supply and demand, and the notion of "wasted resources" rejects our preferences to allocate those resources.

Writing in The Review of Austrian Economics, Ernest C. Pasour says that there may be difficulties distinguishing between beneficial profit-seeking and detrimental rent-seeking.

== Examples ==
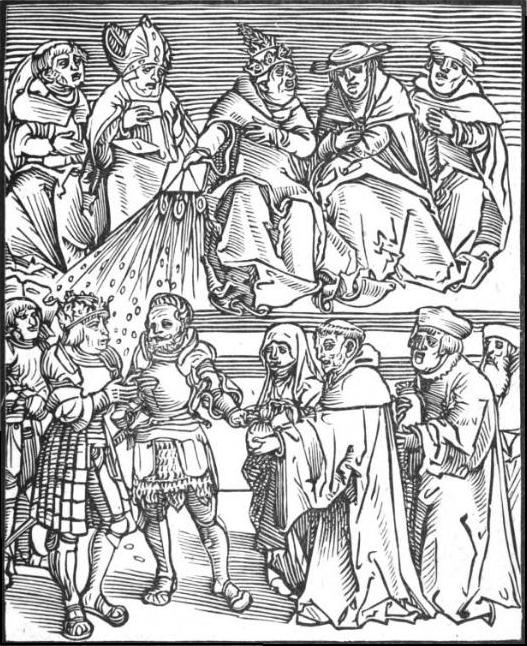
Antichristus, a woodcut by Lucas Cranach the Elder, of the pope using the temporal power to grant authority to a ruler contributing generously to the Catholic Church

The classic example of rent-seeking, according to Robert Shiller, is that of a property owner who installs a chain across a river that flows through the owner's land and then hires a collector to charge passing boats a fee to lower the chain. There is nothing productive about the chain or the collector, nor do passing boats get anything in return. The owner has made no improvements to the river and is not adding value in any way, directly or indirectly, except for themselves. All they are doing is finding a way to obtain money from something that used to be free.

An example of rent-seeking in a modern economy is spending money on lobbying to obtain government subsidies or a share of wealth that has already been created, or to impose regulations on competitors in order to increase one's own market share.

Economists such as Paul Krugman and Lord Adair Turner, the former chair of the British Financial Services Authority, have argued that innovation in the financial industry is often a form of rent-seeking.

=== Corruption ===
The concept of rent-seeking would also apply to corruption of bureaucrats who solicit and extract "bribe" or "rent" for applying their legal but discretionary authority for awarding legitimate or illegitimate benefits to clients. For example, taxpayers may bribe officials to lessen their tax burden. According to Anne Krueger, the political forces that lead to debt difficulties are powerful.

=== Licensing ===
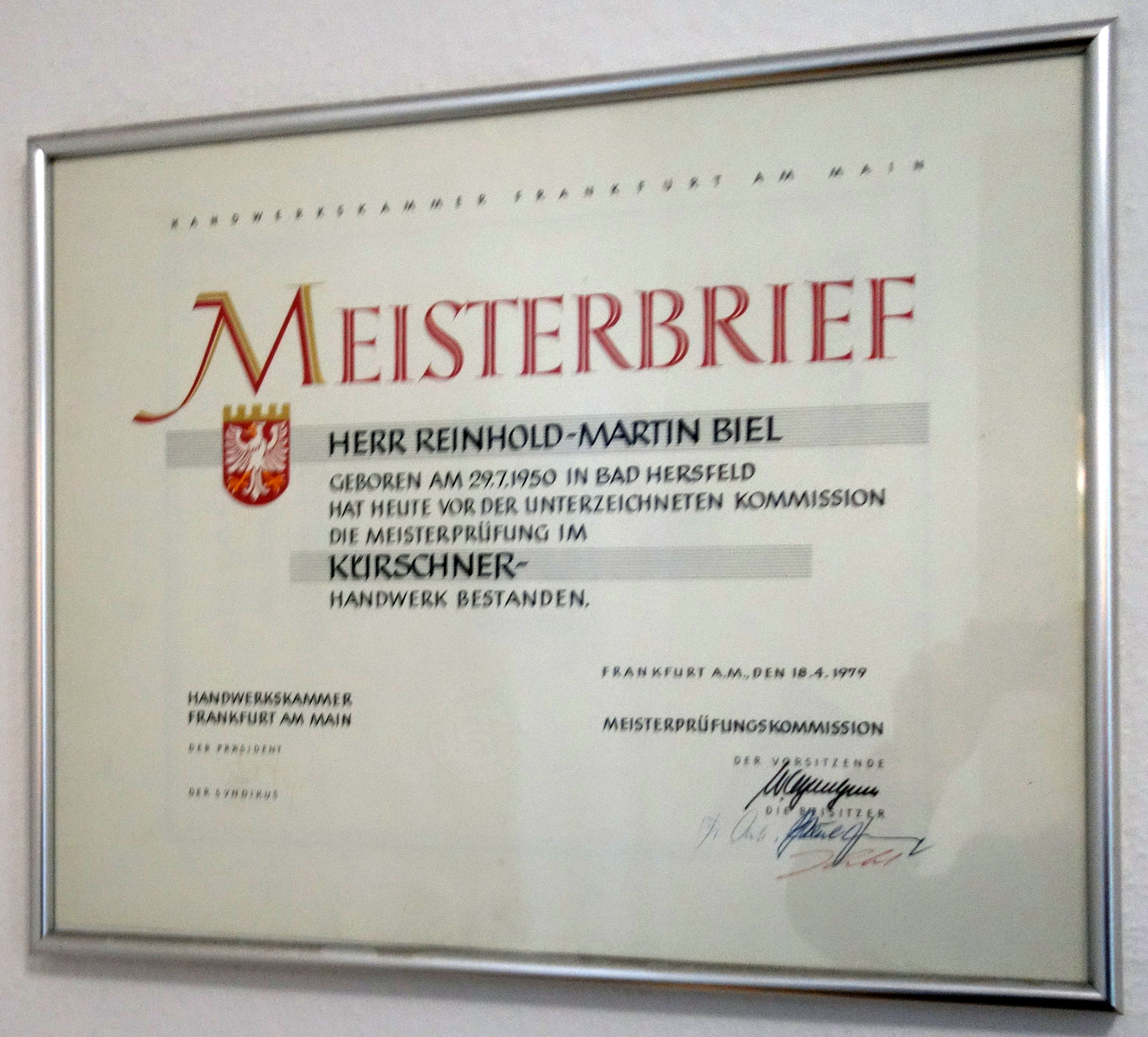
There is a debate among economists as to whether occupational licencing, such as Master Craftsman's diplomas and similar credentials, are an example of rent-seeking (to limit competition in the job market) or a legitimate effort to protect safety.

Another example of rent-seeking is the limiting of access to lucrative occupations, as by medieval guilds or modern state job certifications and occupational licensing. According to some libertarian perspectives, taxi licensing is a textbook example of rent-seeking. To the extent that the issuing of licenses constrains overall supply of taxi services (rather than ensuring competence or quality), forbidding competition from other vehicles for hire renders the (otherwise consensual) transaction of taxi service a forced transfer of part of the fee, from customers to taxi business proprietors.

=== Subsidies ===
Rent-seeking through government enterprise can take the form of seeking subsidies and establishing or avoiding tariffs. This seems like the actions of a firm looking for investment in productivity, but in doing so, creates an exclusionary effect for more productive firms.

Lotta Moberg presents an argument that export processing zones (EPZs) allow governments to choose exporting industries that receive tariffs, allowing rent-seeking to take place. An example of this occurred in Latin America in the 1960s with Joaquín Balaguer's response to pressure from the United States to open the Dominican Republic's export market. At the time, the United States was a significant trading partner for sugar, while providing foreign aid and military support, which allowed Balaguer's regime to take hold. Joaquín Balaguer utilized EPZs to permit specific markets to remain tariffed while appeasing those facing political pressures. This created a sub-optimal environment for exporters as they were able to invest in rent-seeking activities (lobbying) to gain access to EPZs to achieve tax and tariff exemptions.

=== Notable cases ===
In India's industrial sector, import licensing was an example in Anne Krueger's 1974 analysis of rent-seeking. She examined a system in which licenses for imported intermediate goods were allocated in proportion to firms' production capacity. This could encourage investment in additional plant to obtain more import licenses even when output did not increase, diverting resources into competition for the licenses.

In the United States, economists Omer Gokcekus, Justin Knowles and Edward Tower analyzed the sugar industry's campaign contributions as rent-seeking aimed at maintaining trade protection. Their study of contributions to senators between 1989 and 2002 found that membership of committees overseeing sugar policy and membership of the majority party attracted additional contributions. The authors examined this political activity in the context of a sugar program whose import restrictions and price supports benefited producers at the expense of sugar users.

In Indonesia's timber industry under Suharto, Anne Cullen's review of forestry politics identified rent-seeking by industrialists whose political connections gave them privileged access to ministers, including Bob Hasan and the industry associations he led. Christopher Barr's study of APKINDO described how, with Suharto's support, the association controlled plywood export quotas and marketing. Hasan used this authority to require producers to sell through trading companies he controlled, which collected fees and held exclusive distribution rights in several export markets.

In Australia, Chris Berg, then a research fellow at the Institute of Public Affairs, described appeals to Qantas's national-carrier status in support of a proposed government debt guarantee in 2014 as rent-seeking. The government declined to provide the guarantee. Journalist Joe Aston also characterized Qantas's solicitation of state-government incentives during its 2020 property review as rent-seeking. Qantas said the review sought greater efficiency; New South Wales' draft incentive offer included investment and job-creation conditions.

== See also ==
- Cartel
- Car dealership § Regulations that protect car dealers
- Client politics
- Crony capitalism
- Cybersquatting
- Elasticity of supply
- Enshittification
- Geolibertarianism
- He who does not work, neither shall he eat
- Intellectual property
- Landed gentry
- Land monopoly
- Land value tax
- Law of rent (Ricardo)
- Legal plunder
- The Logic of Collective Action
- Manorialism
- Patent troll
- Prisoner's dilemma
- Rentier state
- Royalty payment
- Software patent
- Tragedy of the anticommons
- Unearned income
- Unjust enrichment
- Value capture
- White-collar crime
