= Free ride =

Free ride, freeride, or freeriding may refer to:

== Economics ==
- Free-rider problem, the problem of underprovision of non-excludable goods
- Freeriding (stocks), buying stocks without money to cover the purchase

=== Transportation ===
- Fare evasion, the act of travel without payment on public transit
  - Freighthopping (fare evasion on trains)
  - Stowaways
- Free public transport, public transport fully funded by means other than collecting fares from passengers

=== Social choice ===
- Freeriding (voting), a kind of strategic voting

== Sports ==
- Freerider (climb), a climbing route in Yosemite
- Freeriding (winter sport), skiing or snowboarding in natural, un-groomed terrain
- Freeride (longboard), a discipline of longboarding
- Freeride (mountain biking), a branch of mountain biking
- Freeride kayaking
- Boulder Freeride, a University of Colorado skiing club
- KTM Freeride, a model of off-road motorcycle

== Media ==
=== Film and television ===
- Free Ride (TV series), a Fox TV sitcom
- Free Ride (1986 film), a 1986 film
- Free Ride (2013 film)
- A Free Ride, a 1915 American pornographic film and the earliest surviving American pornographic film

=== Music ===
- Free Ride (album), a 1977 album by Dizzy Gillespie
- Free Ride, a 1978 album by Marshall Hain
- Free Ride, a 2004 album by Carson Cole

==== Songs ====
- "Free Ride" (song), a 1973 song by Dan Hartman for the Edgar Winter Group
- "Free Ride", a song by Nick Drake on the album Pink Moon
- "Free Ride", a song by Annabelle Chvostek on the album Bija
- "Free Ride", a song by the Concretes on the album Nationalgeographic
- "Free Ride", a song by Audio Adrenaline on the album Bloom
- "Free Ride", a song by Mock Orange on the album First EP
- "Free Ride", a song by Watashi Wa on the album Eager Seas
- "Free Ride", a song by Black Label Society on the album Hangover Music Vol. VI
- "Free Ride", a song by Embrace on the album All You Good Good People
