= Wilhelm Röpke =

German economist (1899–1966)

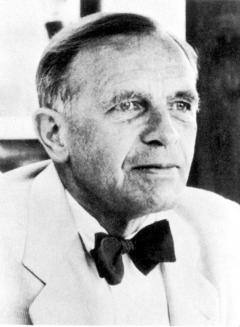
- Röpke in 1950
- Born: 10 October 1899; Schwarmstedt, German Empire
- Died: 12 February 1966 (aged 66); Geneva, Switzerland

Academic background
- Education: University of Marburg
- Influences: Smith · Böhm-Bawerk · Hayek · Mises · Rüstow · Strigl

Academic work
- Discipline: Economics; Ethics; Social criticism
- School or tradition: Austrian School of economics (early); Ordoliberalism (later); Conservatism
- Institutions: University of Marburg, Istanbul University, Geneva Graduate Institute
- Notable ideas: Theoretical foundation of the German economic miracle

Wilhelm Röpke (German: [ˈvɪlˌhɛlm ˈʁœpkə]; 10 October 1899 – 12 February 1966) was a German economist and social critic, one of the spiritual fathers of the social market economy. A professor of economics, first in Jena, then in Graz, Marburg, Istanbul, and finally Geneva, Röpke theorised and collaborated to organise the post-World War II economic re-awakening of the war-wrecked German economy, deploying a program referred to as ordoliberalism, a more conservative variant of German liberalism.

With Alfred Müller-Armack and Alexander Rüstow (sociological neoliberalism) and Walter Eucken and Franz Böhm (ordoliberalism) he elucidated the ideas, which then were introduced formally by Germany's post-World War II Minister for Economics Ludwig Erhard, operating under Konrad Adenauer's Chancellorship. Röpke and his colleagues' economic influence therefore is considered largely responsible for enabling Germany's post-World War II "economic miracle". Röpke was also a historian and was nominated to the Nobel Prize in Literature in 1965.

== Life ==
Röpke was born in to the family of a rural doctor. His parents were devout Protestants and politically liberal. From 1917 he studied law and economics at the universities of Göttingen, Tübingen and Marburg. In 1921 he defended his doctoral thesis, and in 1922 he successfully completed the habilitation procedure for his doctoral degree at the University of Marburg. In 1922 he received a professorship at the University of Jena, becoming the youngest professor in Germany. This was followed by a stay in the US as a visiting professor for the Rockefeller Foundation, in 1928 an appointment at the University of Graz and in 1929 an appointment at the Philipps University in Marburg, where he worked until 1933 as a professor of political economy.

Röpke's opposition to the German National Socialist regime led him (with his family) in 1933 to emigrate to Istanbul, Turkey, where he taught until 1937, before accepting a position at the Geneva Graduate Institute, where he lived until his death, in 1966.

== Work ==
In his youth, Röpke was first inspired by socialism and afterwards by the Austrian School economist Ludwig von Mises. Despite this, the post-World War II economic liberation enabling Germany to once again lead Europe, which Röpke and his allies (Walter Eucken, Franz Böhm, Alfred Müller-Armack and Alexander Rüstow) were the intellectual muscle behind, occurred by implementing policy divergent to that advocated by Ludwig von Mises. Though the two men shared some beliefs in certain areas, Röpke and his colleagues instead formed the school of ordoliberalism and advocated free trade but with more central bank and state influence than what Austrian School economists suggest is required. Unlike many mainstream Austrian School economists, Röpke and the ordoliberals conceded that the market economy can be more disruptive and inhumane unless intervention is permitted a role to play.

Following Alexander Rüstow, Röpke concluded that free markets' vaunted efficiency and affluence can exact social and spiritual forfeits. In consequence, he envisioned a positive and more extensive role for the state, as rulemaker, enforcer of competition, and provider of basic social security.

During the Great Depression, Röpke argued in Crises and Cycles that a secondary deflation had to be combated through a fiscal reflation. It has been argued that the secondary deflation essentially is the same phenomenon that Taiwanese-American economist Richard C. Koo in later years has denoted as a balance sheet recession. In spite of this, however, Röpke remained a political decentralist and rejected Keynesian economics, deriding it as "a typically intellectual construction that forgets the social reality behind the integral calculus".

For Röpke, rights and moral habits (Sitte) were key elements which the Central Bank and State (opposed to the Market-Economy) needed to subtly help organise. With a "conforming" social, economic, and financial policy, the task of which is to protect the weak "beyond the market," to equalize interests, set rules of the game, and limit market power, Röpke strove for an economic order of "economic humanism," something which he also referred to as the "Third Way."

Röpke stood for a society and social policy in which human rights are given the highest importance. He believed that individualism must be balanced by a well-thought-out principle of sociality and humanity. Significantly, Röpke's economic thought is highly congruent with Catholic social teaching. As he grew older, Röpke increasingly appreciated the overall, general benefits of a society that embraces spirituality, particularly in contrast to societies where spirituality is marginalized or demonized.

Röpke is also known for his views in support of South African apartheid. In 1964, he published South Africa: An Attempt at a Positive Appraisal, which argued that apartheid was justified because the 'South African Negro' was not only of 'an utterly different race' but 'a completely different type and level of civilisation'. Taking a position opposed to many Western governments, Röpke also supported the 1965 unilateral declaration of independence of Rhodesia, the racially-segregated southern African territory, from the British Empire.

== Influence ==
In particular, from 1930 to 1931, Röpke served on a government commission examining unemployment and, from 1947 to 1948, he served on Germany's post-World War II currency reform council. Furthermore, Röpke personally advised the Chancellor of (post-World War II) West Germany, Konrad Adenauer, and his Minister of Economics, Ludwig Erhard up until the late 1950s, and therefore is credited with contributing the intellectual backbone of the now famous German Economic "Miracle".

Occupying West Germany following the conclusion of World War II, the Western Allies (the US, Britain, and France) had continued to implement an economic policy of rationing as well as wage and price controls, coupled with the continued excessive printing of paper money. Production consequently collapsed and prominent businessmen once again became unwilling to accept the (relatively) worthless currency, triggering widespread shortages and the mainstreaming of a grey-market barter economy. Röpke's The Solution to the German Problem (1947) illuminated the negative implications of the Western Allies' continuing of Hitler's economic policies. Instead, Röpke proposed abolishing price controls and replacing the reichsmark with a sound, more trustworthy currency.

Accordingly, price and wage controls were then incrementally abolished and on June 21, 1948, the new Deutsche Mark was introduced. These long-range policy initiatives, however, spawned some civil unrest immediately following their implementation because of a consequent increase in unemployment. Despite these disturbances and stoically supported by Röpke's learned newspaper writings, the Minister of Economics Ludwig Erhard persevered with foresight, and this eventually amounted to "a great personal vindication for Röpke": Röpke and his allies had "made West Germany immune to communism".

He was president of the Mont Pelerin Society from 1961 to 1962. But as a result of a long quarrel with Friedrich August von Hayek he stepped down and terminated his membership in it.

== Works ==
- German Commercial Policy (1934)
- Crises and Cycles (1936)
- International Economic Disintegration (1942)
- Civitas Humana (1944)
- The German Question (1946)
- The Social Crisis of Our Time (1950)
- Mass und mitte (eng: Measure and Center) (1950)
- International Order and Economic Integration (1959)
- A Humane Economy: The Social Framework of the Free Market (1960)
- Economics of the Free Society (1963)
- Against the Tide (1969); posthumous essay collection
- Two Essays by Wilhelm Roepke (1987)

== See also ==
- Conservatism in Germany
- List of liberal theorists
