= Roundaboutness =

Method of goods production

Roundaboutness, or roundabout methods of production, is the process whereby capital goods are produced first and then, with the help of the capital goods, the desired consumer goods are produced. Roundaboutness states that more time-intensive and capital-rich methods of production may lead to greater long run productivity, even if in the short run they are less productive. This idea ties closely to other ideas on the time value of money and interest rates, where interest is a premium paid for deferring consumption in the present.

An argument against Böhm-Bawerk's theory of roundaboutness, in economies with compound interest, was presented by Paul Samuelson during the Cambridge capital controversy. Several Austrian economists, such as Carl Menger, Ludwig Lachmann, and Ludwig von Mises, either came to or started off rejecting roundaboutedness.

The concept, interpreted as rising technical composition of capital, is also used by some Marxian authors.
