= Karl Marx and the Close of His System =

1896 book by Eugen von Böhm-Bawerk

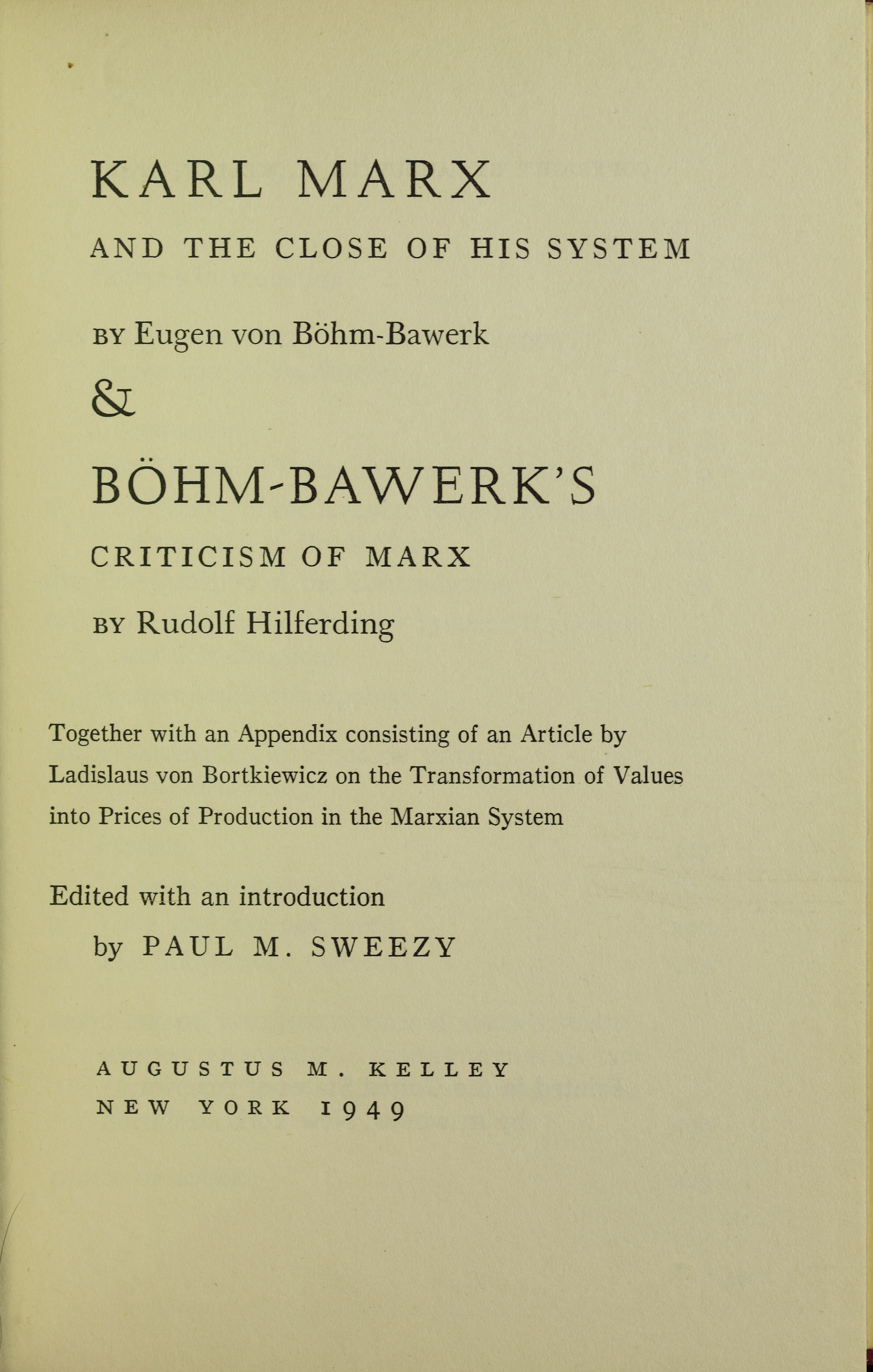
- Cover of the 1949 edition
- Author: Eugen von Böhm-Bawerk
- Original title: Zum Abschluss des Marxschen Systems
- Language: German
- Subject: Karl Marx
- Published: 1896 (in German); 1898 (in English)
- Publication place: Germany
- Media type: Print (Hardcover and Paperback)
- Pages: 224 (Orion reprint edition)
- ISBN: 978-1466347687

Karl Marx and the Close of His System (German: Zum Abschluss des Marxschen Systems) is an 1896 book critical of the economic writings of Karl Marx by the Austrian economist Eugen von Böhm-Bawerk. In the critique, he claims to expose flaws in the writings of Karl Marx. The text offered an early analysis of Marxist theory (see Criticism of Marxism).

== Background ==
Böhm-Bawerk's work first appeared in 1896, in Staatswissenschaftliche Arbeitern: Festgaben für Karl Knies, a collection of essays in honor of the German economist Karl Knies. It was published as a separate work later in 1896, and appeared in Russian translation in 1897 and in English translation in 1898.

== Summary ==
Böhm-Bawerk examines Marx's analysis of value, claiming the basic error in Marx's system to have resulted from a self-contradiction in Marx's law of value: namely, how the rate of profit and the prices of production of the third volume of Marx's Das Kapital contradict Marx's theory of value in the first volume. He also attacks Marx for downplaying the influence of supply and demand in determining permanent price, and for deliberate ambiguity with such concepts.

== Reception ==
Karl Marx and the Close of His System has been seen as one of the most important discussions of Marx's economic theories, along with Rudolf Hilferding's Böhm-Bawerk's Criticism of Marx, a defense of Marx against Böhm-Bawerk. The work is considered the "classical" critique of Capital. Most subsequent critiques of Marxist economics have repeated Böhm-Bawerk's arguments.

The economist Peter Boettke credited Böhm-Bawerk with demonstrating internal contradictions between Marx's theory of value and his distribution theory.

Marxist economist Ernest Mandel identifies Karl Marx and the Close of His System as part of a literature, beginning with German social democrat Eduard Bernstein, that criticizes the dialectical method Marx borrowed from Georg Wilhelm Friedrich Hegel as "useless", "metaphysical", or "mystifying." He faults Böhm-Bawerk and the other critics for what he regards as their "positivist narrowness".

Marxist economist Paul Sweezy rejects Böhm-Bawerk's view that the theory of value must be abandoned. However, he considers Karl Marx and the Close of His System to be the best statement of the argument that the fact that the law of value is not directly controlling in capitalist production requires the rejection of the theory of value.
