= Capital and Interest =

1880's book series by Eugen Böhm von Bawerk

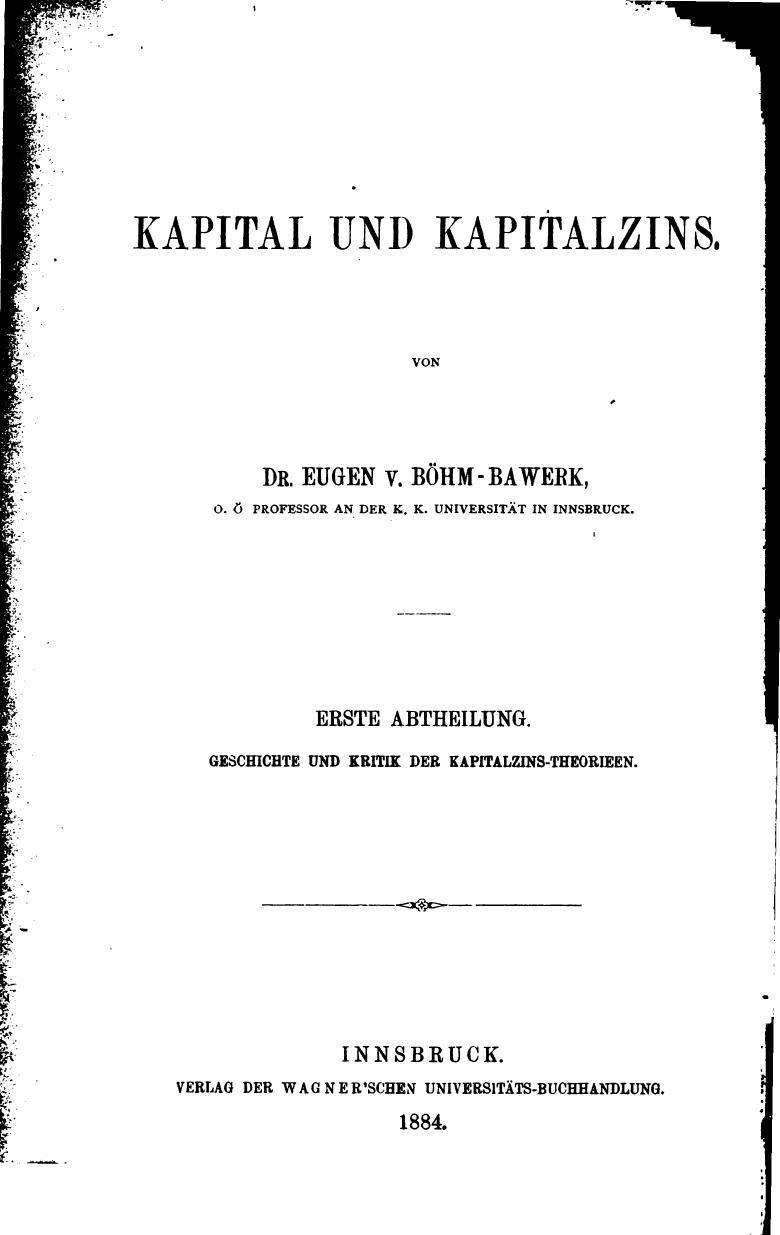
- Author: Eugen Böhm von Bawerk
- Genre: Finance
- Publication date: 1884

Capital and Interest (German: Kapital und Kapitalzins) is a three-volume work on finance published by Austrian economist Eugen Böhm von Bawerk (1851–1914).

== Summary ==
The first two volumes were published in the 1880s when he was teaching at the University of Innsbruck.

The first volume of Capital and Interest, titled History and Critique of Interest Theories (1884), is an exhaustive survey of the alternative treatments of the phenomenon of interest: use theories, productivity theories, abstinence theories, and many more.

In this work Böhm-Bawerk built upon the time preference ideas of Carl Menger, insisting that there is always a difference in value between present goods and future goods of equal quality, quantity, and form. Furthermore, the value of future goods diminishes as the length of time necessary for their completion increases.

Böhm-Bawerk cited three reasons for this difference in value. First of all, in a growing economy, the supply of goods will always be larger in the future than it is in the present. Secondly, people have a tendency to underestimate their future needs due to carelessness and shortsightedness. Finally, entrepreneurs would rather initiate production with goods presently available, instead of waiting for future goods and delaying production.

Also included was a critique of Marx's exploitation theory. Böhm-Bawerk argued that capitalists do not exploit workers; they accommodate workers – by providing them with income well in advance of the revenue from the output they helped to produce.

Böhm-Bawerk's Positive Theory of Capital (1889), offered as the second volume of Capital and Interest, elaborated on the economy's time-consuming production processes and of the interest payments they entail. Book III, Value and Price, built on Menger's Principles to present a distinctly Austrian version of marginalism. To illustrate marginalism, he gave the following example:

A pioneer farmer had five sacks of grain, with no way of selling them or buying more. He had five possible uses – as basic feed for himself, food to build strength, food for his chickens for dietary variation, an ingredient for making whisky and feed for his parrots to amuse him. Then the farmer lost one sack of grain. Instead of reducing every activity by a fifth, the farmer simply starved the parrots as they were of less utility than the other four uses, in other words they were on the margin. And it is on the margin, and not with a view to the big picture, that we make economic decisions.

Further Essays on Capital and Interest (1921) was started as appendices to the second volume, but appeared as a third volume.

The Ludwig von Mises Institute made available in 2007 the William Smart translations as Capital and Interest, Positive Theory of Capital, and Recent Literature on Interest.
