= Freedoms Foundation =

Non-profit, non-partisan, non-sectarian educational organization

Coordinates: 40.1049°N 75.4752°W

Freedoms Foundation at Valley Forge (now Founding Forward) is an American non-profit, non-partisan, non-sectarian educational organization, founded in 1949. The foundation is located adjacent to the Valley Forge National Historical Park, near Valley Forge, Pennsylvania. In early 2024, the organization merged with the Union League Legacy Foundation to create Founding Forward, a new civic education non-profit.

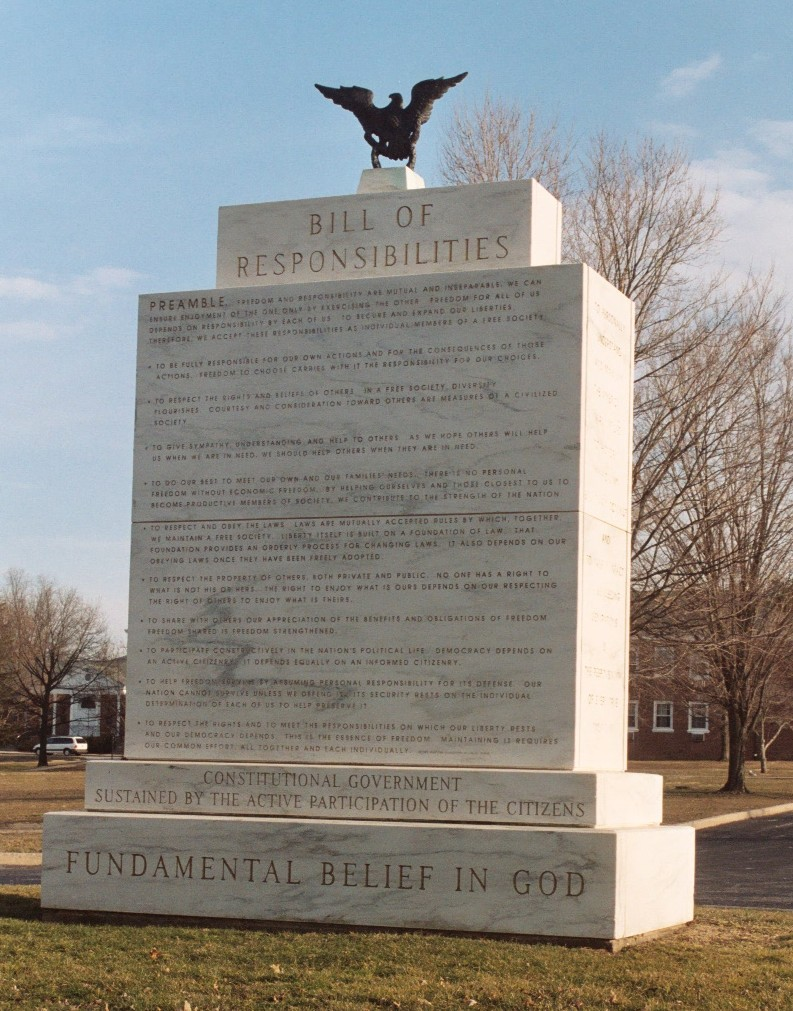
Bill of Responsibilities at the Freedoms Foundation

== Bill of Responsibilities ==
In 1985, the foundation developed a "Bill of Responsibilities" as part of its worldwide educational efforts. It was meant to be a corollary to the Bill of Rights.

== Medal of Honor Grove ==
As part of its mission to promote responsible citizenship, character and freedom, the foundation maintains a grove dedicated to recipients of the Medal of Honor, the nation's highest award for valor. The Medal of Honor Grove consists of forty-two acres of woodland. Within the grove, each area is dedicated to one of the fifty states, the District of Columbia, or the Commonwealth of Puerto Rico. Each acre contains an obelisk that features a dedication plaque, plus the seal of that state, the District of Columbia, or Puerto Rico, plus a list of Medal of Honor recipients from that state, D.C., or Puerto Rico. In most cases, a tree has been planted for each recipient, along with a tree marker that contains the name, rank, unit, and date and place of action for the recipient. "America's Walk of Honor" was dedicated in April 1997, to allow visitors an opportunity to walk the grounds of the Medal of Honor Grove. American artist Peter Max designed the first stone on the Walk of Honor.

At the foundation are ninety volumes of research on Medal of Honor recipients, including photographs, sketches, biographies, and handwritten citations.

The grove is supported by the Friends of the Medal of Honor Grove, a nonprofit organization which seeks to maintain and upgrade the fifty-two acres of the woodland park, in honor of Medal of Honor recipients.

=== Gallery ===
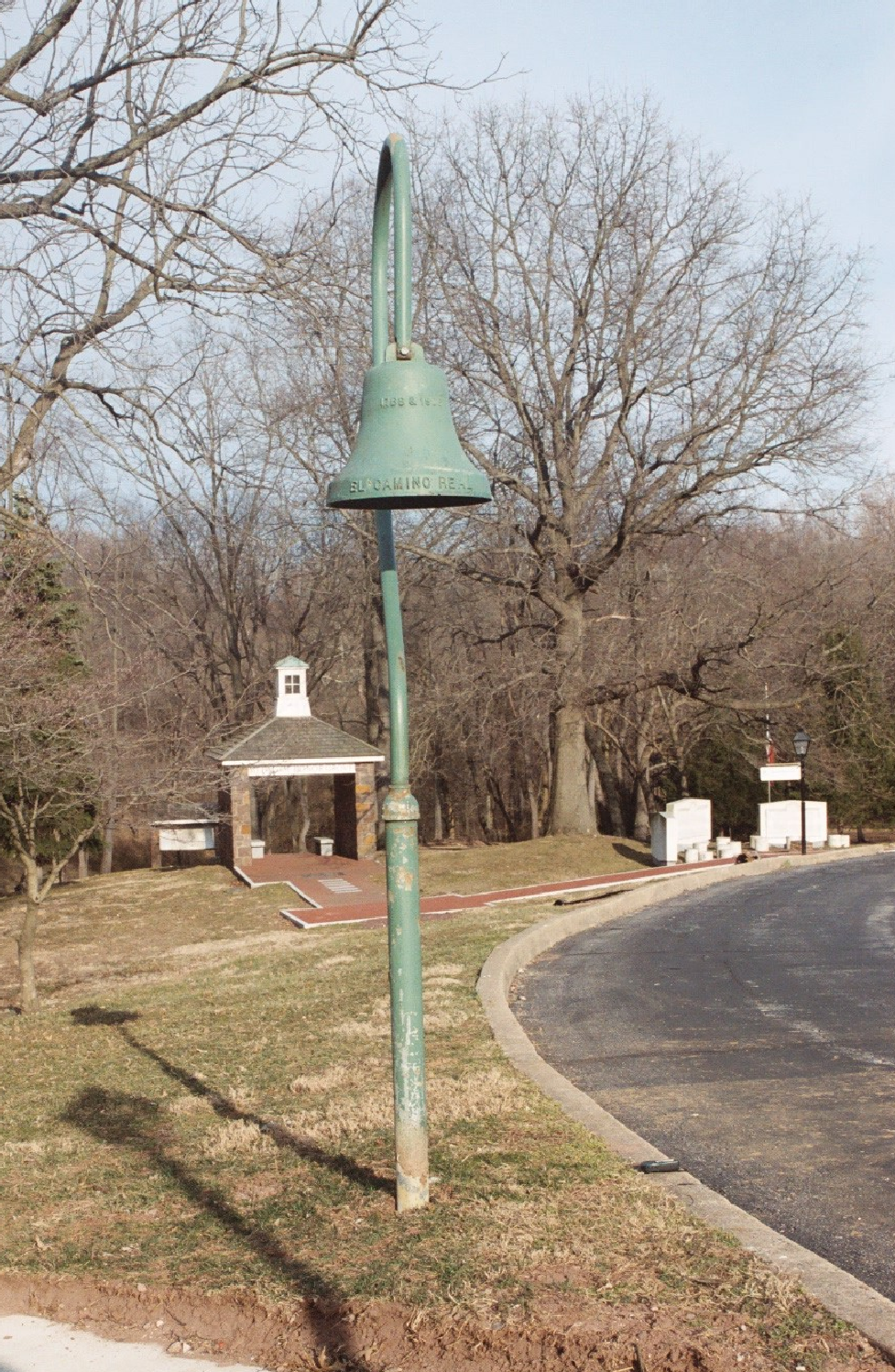
California Section of the Medal of Honor Grove

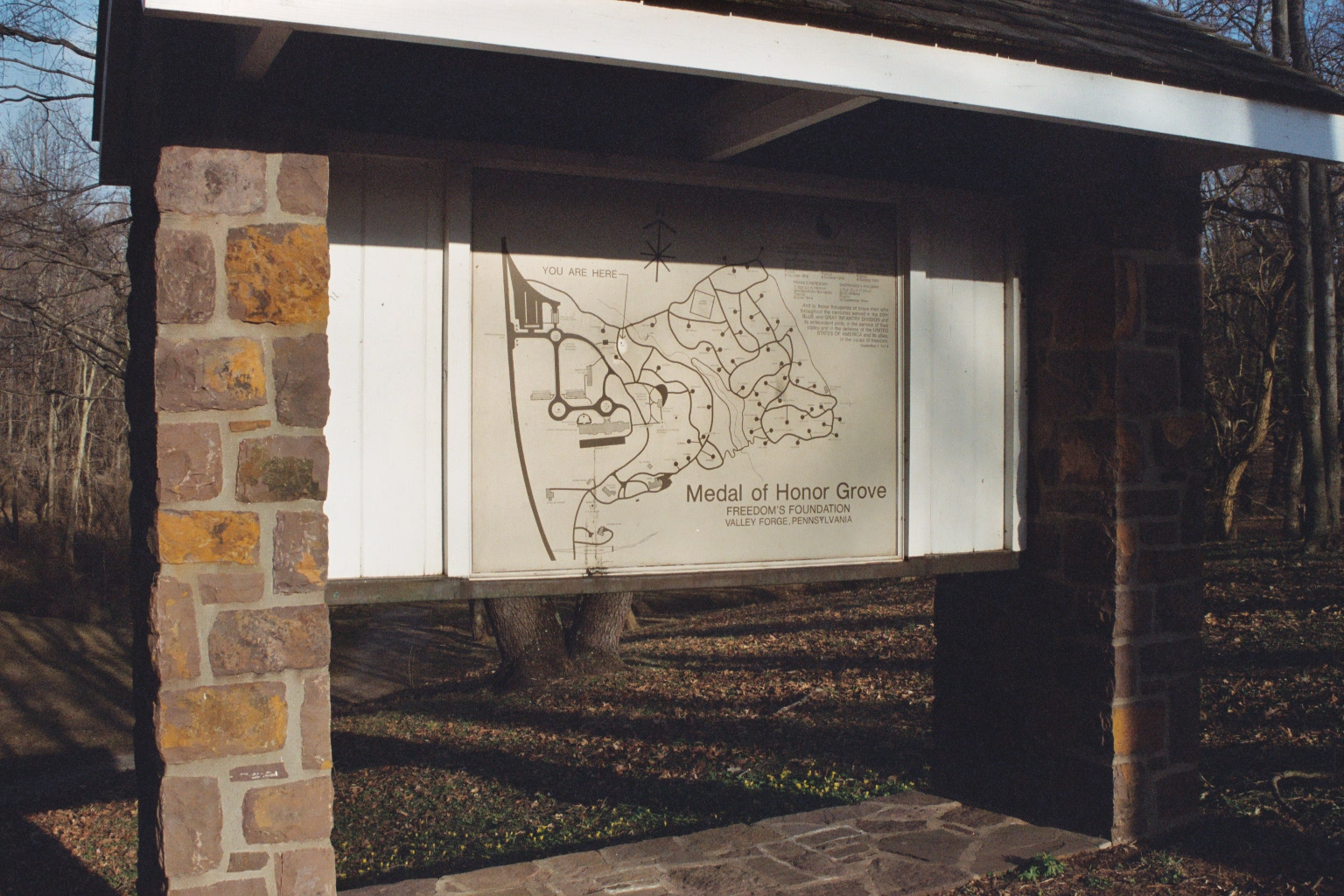
Directory of the Medal of Honor Grove

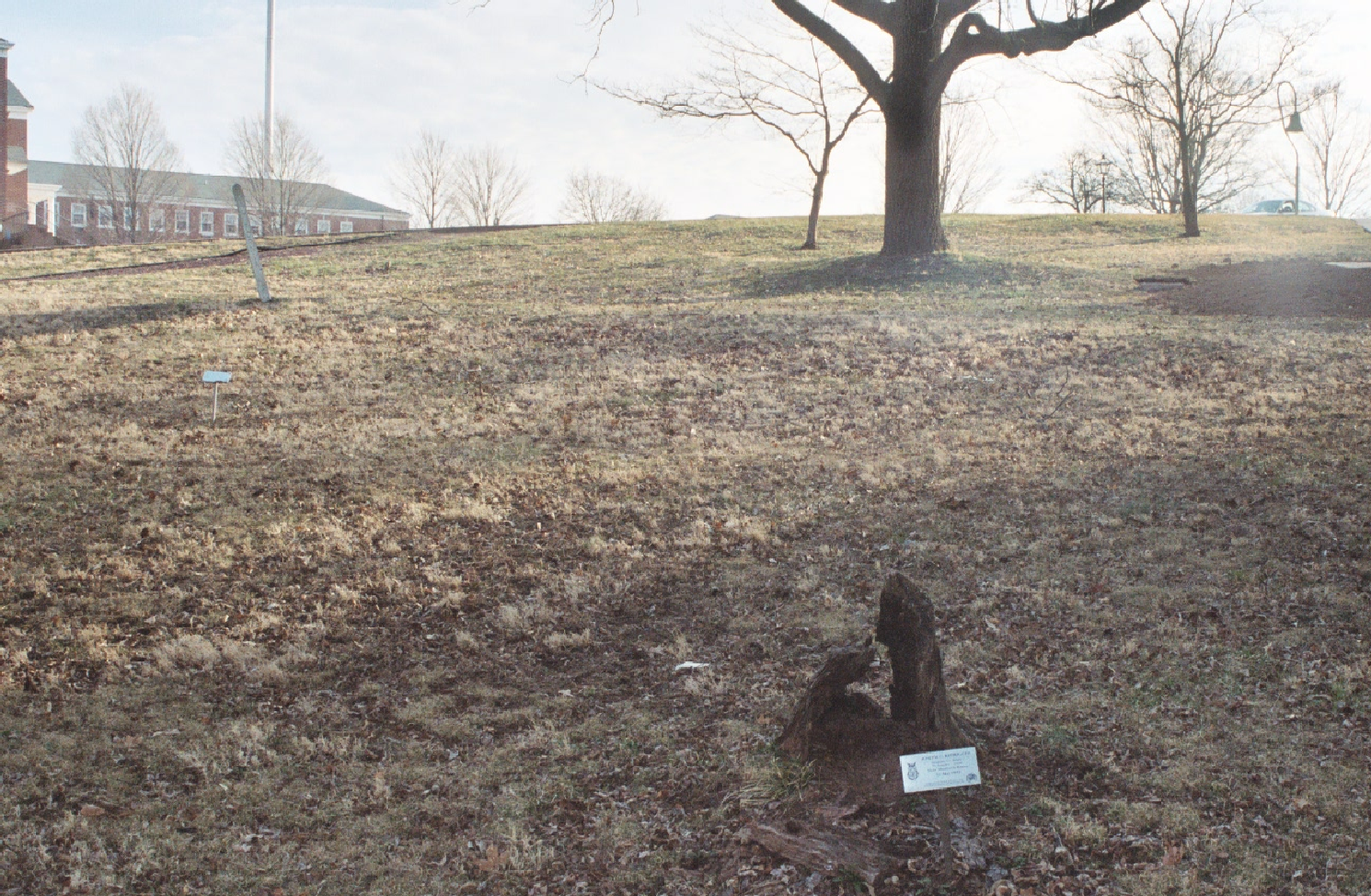
Medal of Honor Grove Individual Tree

== Involvement with the Boy Scouts of America ==
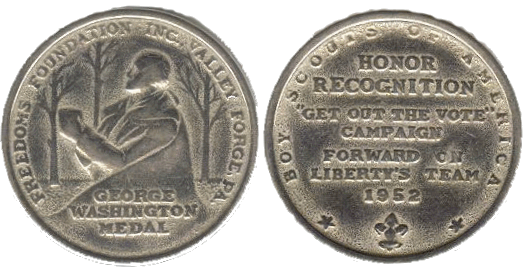
George Washington Medal issued in 1952 as part of the BSA theme Forward on Liberty's Team

Since 1949, Freedoms Foundation and the Boy Scouts of America have worked together, including with the creation of the "Price of Freedom" conference, a four-day residential program where participants interact with experts on current issues of citizenship, patriotism, leadership, and heroism.
