= Ernest C. Pasour =

American economist (born 1932)

E. C. Pasour, Jr.
- Born: 12 September 1932 (age 94)

Academic background
- Education: Michigan State University

Academic work
- School or tradition: Austrian School
- Institutions: North Carolina State University
- Awards: Leavey Award – Freedoms Foundation at Valley Forge

E. C. Pasour, Jr. (born 1932) is an American economist and Professor Emeritus of Agricultural and Resource Economics at North Carolina State University. He received a PhD in agricultural economics from Michigan State University and spent a sabbatical at the University of Chicago on a NSF Fellowship.

He is the author of books oriented towards the Austrian school of economics.

He received a Freedoms Foundation at Valley Forge Leavey Award for Excellence in Private Enterprise Education.

== Works ==
- Agriculture & the State: Market Processes & Bureaucracy, Independent Institute (1990). ISBN 0-945999-29-1.
- Plowshares & Pork Barrels: The Political Economy of Agriculture, Independent Institute (2005). ISBN 0-945999-03-8.

His work also has been published in The American Journal of Agricultural Economics, Constitutional Political Economy, The Freeman, the Journal of Libertarian Studies, Minerva, National Tax Journal, Public Choice, Reason, the Review of Austrian Economics, the Southern Economic Journal, The Wall Street Journal and others.

== Education and background ==
Pasour was born and raised on a farm in Gaston County, North Carolina. He graduated with a degree in agricultural education from North Carolina State College in 1954, and served in the United States Army for two years. He obtained a master's degree specializing in agricultural economics from N.C. State University. There, he was influenced by the Chicago school of economics, which confirmed his criticisms of government intervention in agriculture. He then enrolled in a PhD program at Michigan State University, where the influence of the Chicago school of economics was much less pronounced. He obtained his PhD in agricultural economics in 1963.

== Career and economic philosophy ==
After teaching as an assistant and associate professor of economics and business at North Carolina State University, Pasour took a sabbatical at the University of Chicago. His view of economics soon began to change, first being influenced by public choice economists, emphasizing the incentives of government decision-makers versus private entrepreneurs, and then by Austrian economists, emphasizing the role of the entrepreneur in the market process. After reading further Austrian works, such as James Buchanan's Cost and Choice and various articles by Friedrich Hayek, Pasour began to apply Austrian and public choice concepts to his work in agricultural economics. He formed the view that Government regulators cannot do what they profess to do–even when they have the best intentions–because they cannot obtain the relevant information to do so. This view was very different from the mainstream at the time.

Pasour would go on to publish articles in various market-oriented publications, including The Freeman, The Intercollegiate Review, and Reason magazine. He was invited to give a talk at the "Freedom in Third Century in America" seminar in 1982, where he was formally identified with the discipline of Austrian economics. In 1983 he became a member of the board of advisers for the Journal of Austrian Economics.

In 1986 he participated in a summer seminar at the Foundation for Economic Education (FEE), where he shared a manuscript on U.S. agricultural policy. FEE edited and published the manuscript for use in a national high school debate program soon after. Pasour was awarded a Freedoms Foundation at Valley Forge Leavey Award for Excellence in Private Enterprise Education in 1989, which was in large part due to the manuscript. The manuscript was later expanded and published as Agriculture & the State: Market Processes & Bureaucracy in 1990.
