= William Smart (economist) =

Scottish economist (1853–1915)

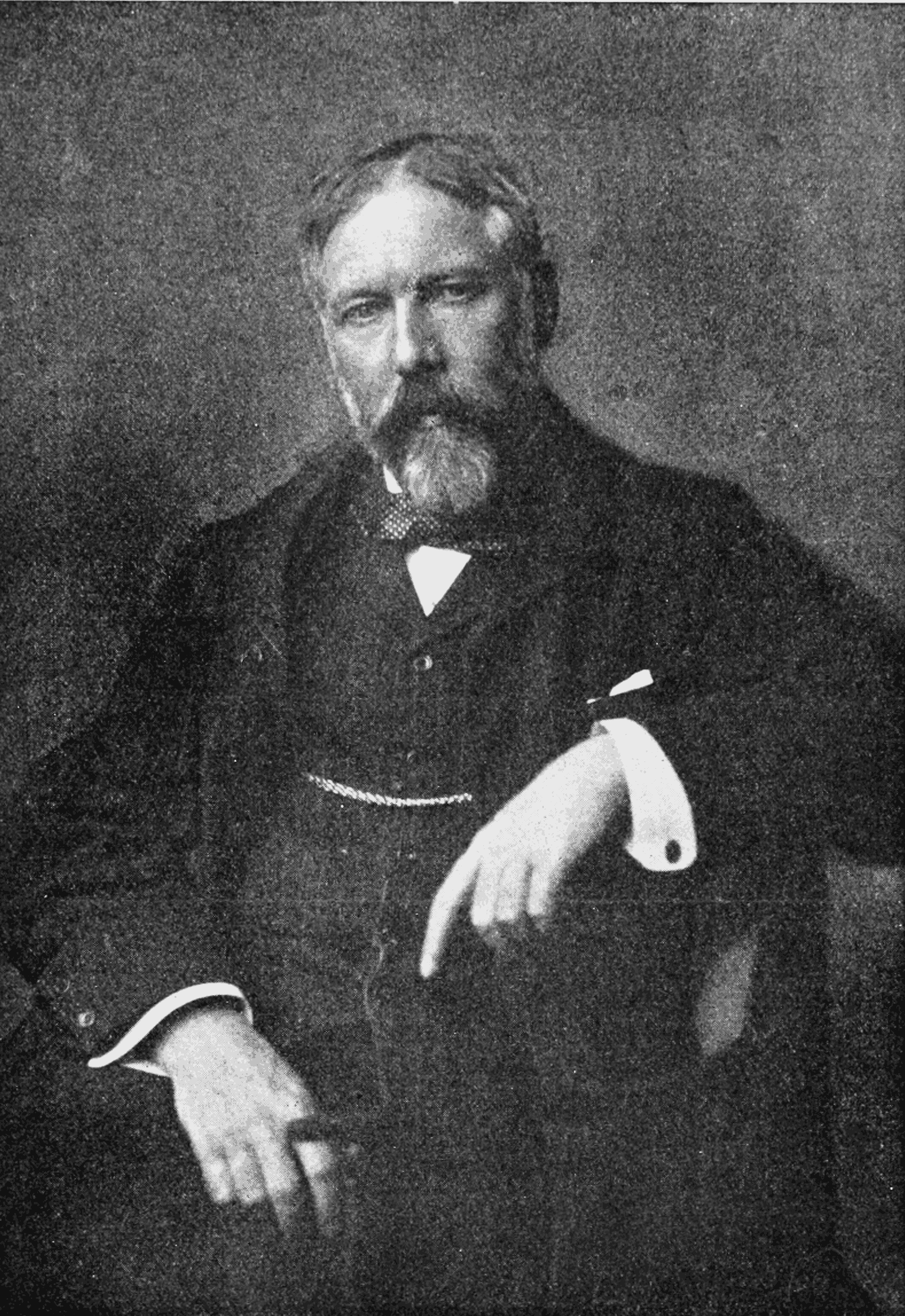
William Smart

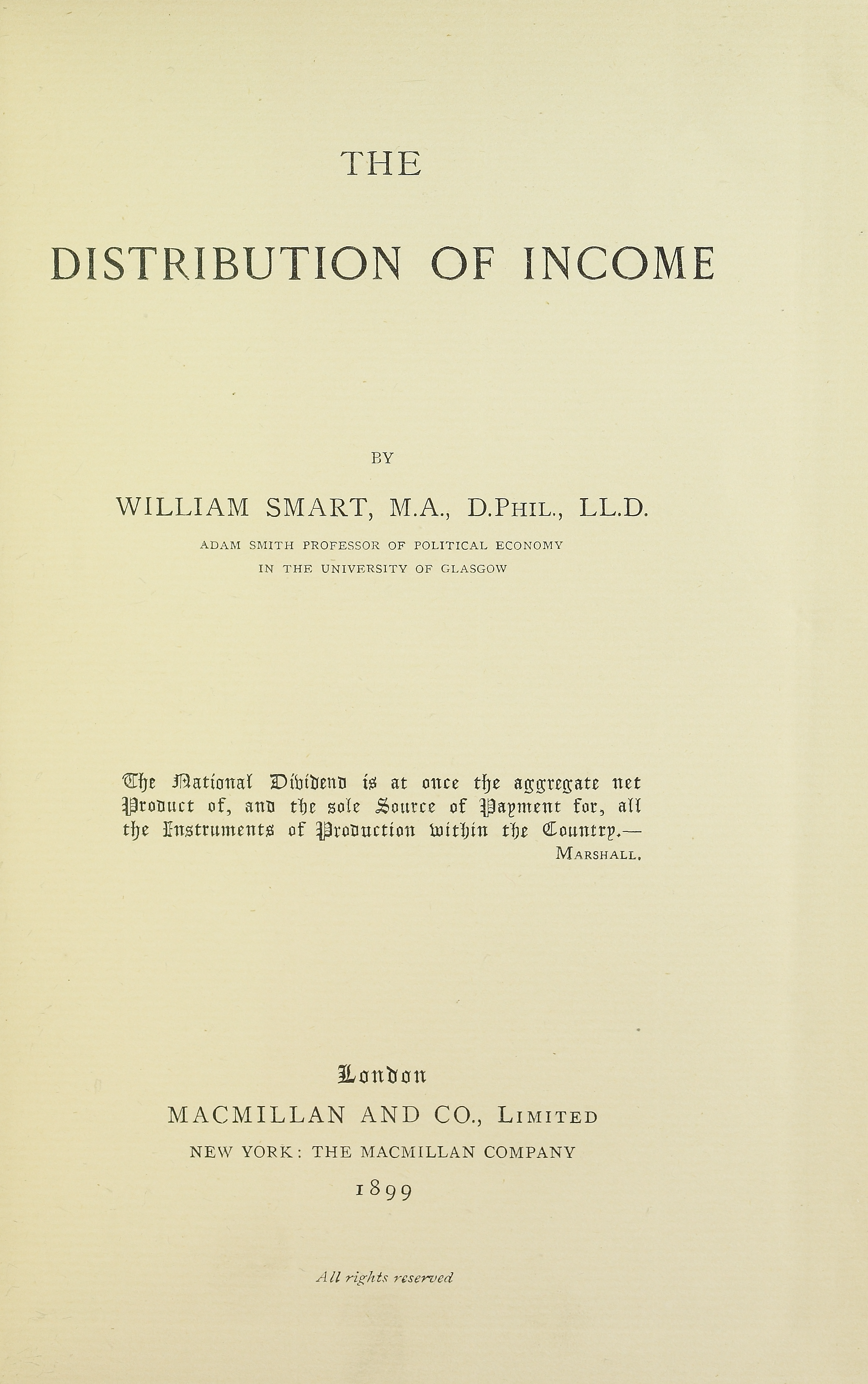
Distribution of income, 1899

William Smart (10 April 1853 – 19 March 1915) was a Scottish economist at the University of Gladgow. Initially inspired by Thomas Carlyle and John Ruskin, Smart was a translator and was largely responsible for dissemination of the thought of the Austrian School, before being won over to the neoclassicalism of Alfred Marshall.

Smart, eldest son of Alexander Smart and grandson of Reverend William Smart, was born in Barrhead, Scotland.

== Works ==
- Smart, William (1883). John Ruskin: His Life and Work. Wilson & McCormick.
- Smart, William (1891). An Introduction to the Theory of Value: on the Lines of Menger, Wieser, and Böhm-Bawerk. London: Macmillan Company – via Internet Archive. 2nd edition
- Böhm-Bawerk, Eugen von (1890). Capital and Interest, a critical history of economical theory. Translated by Smart, William. London, New York: Macmillan and Co.
- Böhm-Bawerk, Eugen von (1891). The Positive Theory of Capital. Translated by Smart, William. New York: G.E. Stechert.
- Smart, William (1904). The Return to Protection. London: Macmillan – via Internet Archive.; via Mises.org
- Smart, William (1910). Economic Annals of the Nineteenth Century: 1801–1830. London: Macmillan and Company, Limited – via Internet Archive.
- Smart, William (1917). Economic Annals of the Nineteenth Century: 1821–1830. Macmillan and Company, limited.
- Smart, William (1895). "Glasgow and Its Municipal Industries". The Quarterly Journal of Economics. 9 (2): 188–194. doi:10.2307/1885599. JSTOR 1885599.
- Clark, J. Maurice (1917). "Reviewed Work: Second Thoughts of an Economist, by William Smart". Journal of Political Economy. 25 (4): 402–404. doi:10.1086/252976. JSTOR 1819087.
- Smart, William (1916). Second Thoughts of an Economist. London: Macmillan and Co.
