= Philipp Bagus =

German economist and academic

Philipp Bagus (born 1980) is a German economist and university lecturer. As a professor of economics, he teaches at the Rey Juan Carlos University in Madrid. He conducts research and publishes particularly on monetary policy and business cycle theory. Bagus is a Fellow of the Ludwig von Mises Institute, a member of the scientific advisory board of the Ludwig von Mises Institute Germany, and a member of the Friedrich A. von Hayek Society and the Mont Pèlerin Society.

== Life ==
Bagus attended the Kardinal-von-Galen-Gymnasium in Mettingen and studied as an Erasmus scholar at Rey Juan Carlos University in 2003/2004. He graduated with a Bachelor of Arts in 2005 and a Diplomvolkswirt (equivalent to a master's degree in economics) in 2006 from the Westfälische Wilhelms-Universität Münster. He earned his Ph.D. at Rey Juan Carlos University in December 2007 under Jesús Huerta de Soto. Guest professorships and teaching assignments have taken him to the universities of Münster, Bayreuth, Prague, Osnabrück, Iași, and Angers, as well as to the Universidad Camilo José Cela in Madrid. Since 2007, he has been teaching at Rey Juan Carlos University (Departamento de Economía Aplicada e Historia e Instituciones Económicas [y Filosofía Moral]), initially as Profesor ayudante, then as Profesor ayudante doctor, later as Profesor contratado doctor, and since 2020 as Profesor titular. Since 2017, he has been the chairman of the board of Elementum International AG, succeeding Hans J. Bocker.

Bagus has published contributions in German-speaking and international academic journals, such as Wirtschaftsdienst, Journal of Business Ethics, Independent Review, and American Journal of Economics and Sociology. His book The Tragedy of the Euro, published in 2010, has been translated into numerous languages. Among other topics, it addresses the tragedy of the commons in relation to the Eurosystem. In 2011, he became a member of the "Frankfurter Zukunftsrat," initiated by Manfred Pohl. Some of his works have received multiple awards, and in 2016 he received the Ludwig-Erhard Prize for Economic Journalism.

== Selected publications ==
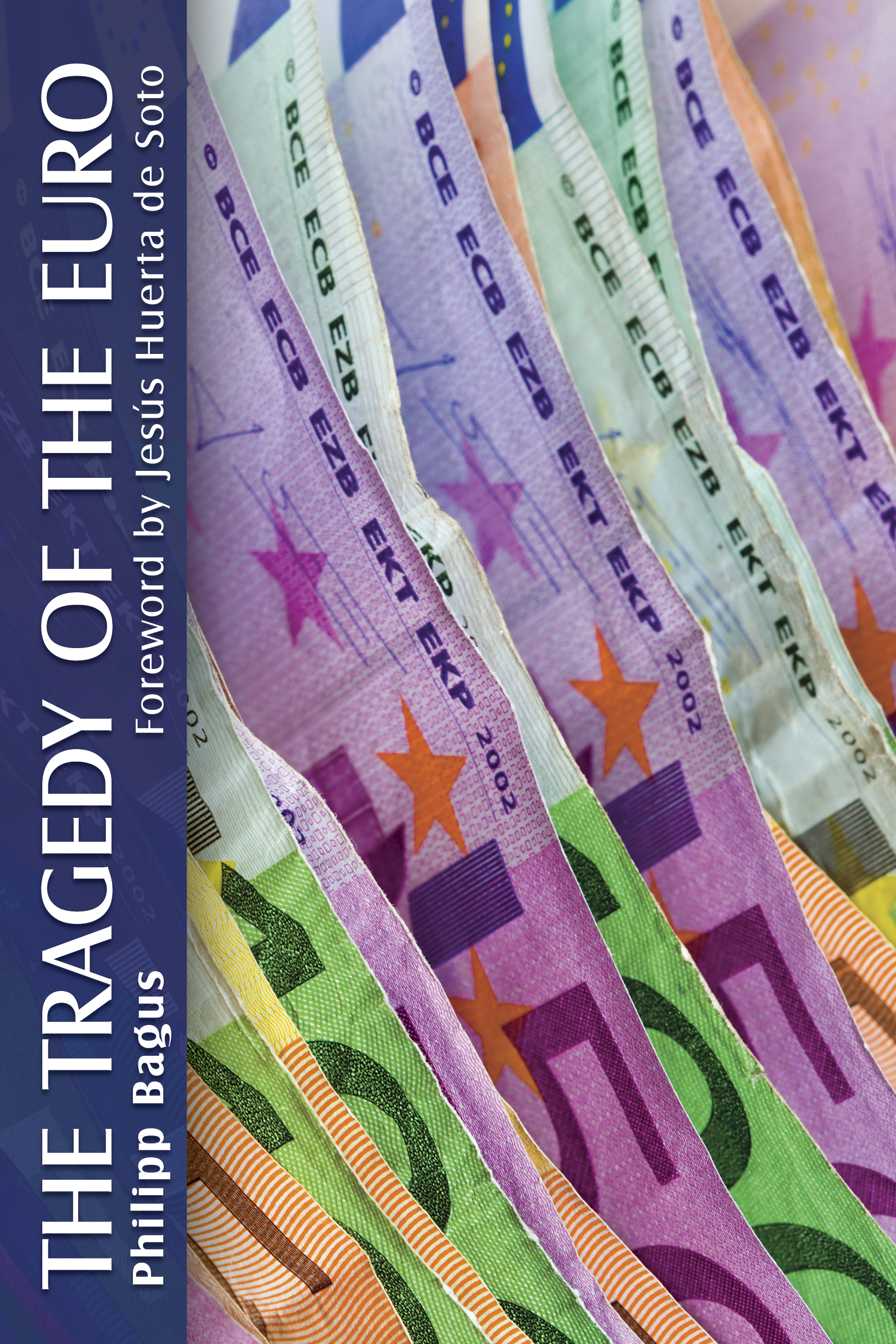
The Tragedy of the Euro, book cover, 2010

- The Tragedy of the Euro. Ludwig von Mises Institute. 2010. ISBN 978-1-61016-316-3.
- In Defense of Deflation. Springer International Publishing, Cham/Schweiz 2015, ISBN 978-3-319-13427-7 (aktualisierte Fassung der Dissertation aus dem Jahr 2007, Vorschau/PDF).
- Die Ära Milei. Argentiniens neuer Weg. Langen Müller, München 2024, ISBN 978-3-7844-3719-4.
- with José Antonio Peña-Ramos and Antonio Sánchez-Bayón: COVID-19 and the Political Economy of Mass Hysteria. In: International Journal of Environmental Research Public Health, 2021, 18 (4), p. 1376 (abstract).
- Reasons Why European Banks are in Trouble. In: Tho Bishop (Hrsg.): Anatomy of the Crash. Ludwig von Mises Institute, Auburn/Alabama 2020, ISBN 978-1-61016-722-2 (Google Books).
- with Jesús Huerta de Soto (main author) and Fabian Lair (coauthor): Die Theorie der dynamischen Effizienz (= Hayek-Schriftenreihe zum Klassischen Liberalismus, Band 4). Duncker & Humblot, Berlin 2020, ISBN 978-3-4281-8007-3 (Originaltitel: The theory of dynamic efficiency [= Routledge Foundations of the Market Economy, Band 28], 2008, PDF).
- with Andreas Marquart: Wir schaffen das – alleine! Warum Kleinstaaten einfach besser sind. Finanzbuch-Verlag, München 2017.
- The ZIRP Trap – The Institutionalization of Negative Real Interest Rates. In: Procesos de Mercado. Revista Europea de Economía Política, 2015, Band 12, Heft 2, pp. 105–163 (Zugang zum PDF).
- with Andreas Marquart: Warum andere auf Ihre Kosten immer reicher werden – und welche Rolle der Staat und unser Papiergeld dabei spielen. Finanzbuch-Verlag, München 2014.
- Austrian economics and new currency theory on 100% banking: A response to Huber. In: Procesos de Mercado. Revista Europea de Economía Política, 11 (1), 2014, pp. 105–136 (abstract).
- with Gerhard Schwarz (Hrsg.): Die Entstaatlichung des Geldes. Verlag Neue Zürcher Zeitung, Zürich 2014.
- Österreichische Konjunkturtheorie. Entwicklung und Relevanz der ÖKT für die heutige Wissenschaft und Wirtschaft. Diplomica Verlag, Hamburg 2014, ISBN 978-3-8428-9687-1 (Google Books).
- Mises’ Staats- und Interventionismuskritik. In: Thorsten Polleit (Hrsg.): Ludwig von Mises. Leben und Werk für Einsteiger. Finanzbuch-Verlag, München 2013, ISBN 978-3-89879-824-2 (Google Books).
- with David Howden: Some Ethical Dilemmas with Modern Banking. In: Business Ethics: A European Review, 22 (3), 2013, pp. 235–245 (PDF).
- with David Howden: Deep Freeze. Iceland’s Economic Collapse. Ludwig von Mises Institute, Auburn/Alabama 2011, ISBN 978-1-933550-34-3 (Google Books).
- Austrian Business Cycle Theory: Are 100 Percent Reserves Sufficient to Prevent a Business Cycle? In: Libertarian Papers, 2 (2), 2010, pp. 1–18 (PDF).
- The Quality of Money. In: The Quarterly Journal of Austrian Economics, 12 (4), 2009, pp. 22–45 (PDF).
- with David Howden: Qualitative Easing in Support of a Tumbling Financial System. A Look at the Eurosystem’s Recent Balance Sheet Policy. In: Economic Affairs, 21, Heft 4 (November 2009), pp. 283–300 (PDF).
- with David Howden: The Legitimacy of Loan Maturity Mismatching: A Risky, But Not Fraudulent, Undertaking. In: Journal of Business Ethics, 90 (3), 2009, pp. 399–406 (PDF).
- with Markus H. Schiml: Notenbankbilanzanalyse: Ein neues Werkzeug der Geldpolitik in der Subprime-Krise. In: Wirtschaftsdienst, 89. Jahrgang (2009), Heft 3, pp. 184–188 (Zugang zum PDF).
- with Markus H. Schiml: Bilanzpolitik und -analyse von Notenbanken im Kontext der Qualitätstheorie des Geldes. In: German Review of New Austrian Economics, 2. Jahrgang (2008), Heft 3.
- Österreichische Konjunkturtheorie aus heutiger Sicht. Grin Verlag, München 2008, ISBN 978-3-640-14490-7.
- Monetary Reform and Deflation – A Critique of Mises, Rothbard, Huerta de Soto and Sennholz. In: New Perspectives on Political Economy, 4 (2), 2008, pp. 131–157.
- Five Common Errors about Deflation. In: Procesos de Mercado. Revista Europea de Economía Política, 3 (1), 2006, pp. 105–123.
- Deflation – When Austrians Become Interventionists. In: The Quarterly Journal of Austrian Economics, 6 (4), 2003, pp. 19–35 (PDF).
