= Freeride (longboard) =

Discipline of the sport longboarding

Freeride is a discipline of the sport longboarding. Freeride is the compound word referring to the act of descending a riding surface interspersed with various maneuvers such as semi-perpendicular slides by breaking traction and carving (riding in an S-shaped path). There are techniques that slow, or "check" speed, quickly assuming the previous riding stance and continuing forward progress. This sliding makes important use of one of the minimal safety devices used (at minimum, it is recommended and is customary to wear a certified helmet and special purpose slide gloves. These uhmw polyurethane or Delrin© puck equipped gloves (Velcro affixed to each palm is a disc or plate of replaceable plastic) permit the freeriders the ability to place a palm down on the ground during the apex of slides to act as a form of outrigger of-sorts, supporting the rider's weight as they slide to shave speed-off their rapidly accelerating decent of a hill. Eventually, as rider experience increases, the need to assist one's balance through the use of "hands-down" style decreases and more experienced freeride practitioners can perform the same results via "standup slide" "pre-checks". Standup slides take much practice and experience to accomplish.

The sliding style itself can have very different and custom-tailored characteristics, this being based on many factors such as riding style, board geometry, truck setup, bushing durometer, hill angle and distance, the asphalt or concrete road surface quality and most importantly, the particular wheel size, shape and material choice (polyurethane durometer) ridden.

Riders often change their riding stance as a result of their body spinning around a vertical axis, which is known as riding "goofy" or "switch". Prominent freeride longboarders include Kyle Chin, Louis Pilloni and James Kelly. The practice and discipline of freeride longboarding is very quickly growing in popularity the world over.
