= Richard Ritter von Strigl =

Austrian economist (1891–1942)

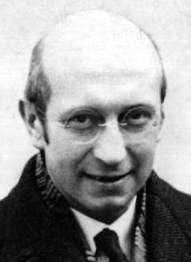
- Born: 7 February 1891; Moravia, Austria-Hungary
- Died: 11 November 1942 (aged 51); Vienna, Nazi Germany

Academic background
- Education: University of Vienna
- Influences: Bohm-Bawerk, Walras, Wieser, Schumpeter, Mises

Academic work
- Discipline: Economics, political science, law, philosophy
- School or tradition: Austrian School
- Notable ideas: Capital and Production, Austrian macroeconomics

Richard von Strigl (Austrian German: [fɔn ˈʃtrɪɡl̩]; 1891–1942) was an Austrian economist. He was considered by his colleagues one of the most brilliant Austrian economists of the interwar period. As a professor at the University of Vienna he had a decisive influence on F. A. Hayek, Fritz Machlup, Gottfried von Haberler, Oskar Morgenstern and other fourth-generation Austrian economists.

== Early life ==
He was born on former Moravia (which is today a part of the Czech Republic). He studied at the University of Vienna and was admitted as a very young man to the famous private seminar of Eugen von Böhm-Bawerk, which had produced a whole generation of promising economists, such as Otto Bauer, Nicolai Bukharin, Ludwig von Mises, Otto Neurath, and Joseph Schumpeter.

After World War I, Strigl continued his research and wrote an important book on economic theory for which, in 1923, he received his Habilitation – the traditional professors' diploma of the universities of Central Europe. Five years later he acceded to the rank of titular extraordinary professor. However, like Mises, Machlup, Haberler, and other Viennese economists of the time, he had to earn his living outside of academia eventually becoming a high official at the Austrian Unemployment Insurance Board.

Strigl was described as a modest, humane, cultured, and very bright man who impressed both his students and impartial colleagues. As one of his pupils, Josef Steindl stated after his death, "There were few of his pupils or of the foreign economists who would visit Vienna and sojourn in his circle of those days who did not very much like him."

He was gifted in systematic exposition and step-by-step argument, which were successful in the classroom. Strigl had a considerable influence on the generation of young economists graduating from the University of Vienna after World War I, influenced Friedrich Hayek, Gottfried Haberler, Fritz Machlup, and Oskar Morgenstern, amongst other Viennese economists.

Strigl convinced his students that economic theory could be studied in its own right, that is, without engaging in previous empirical field studies. And this theory could be used to both explain economic phenomena and to direct political action.

Despite the rise of the Austrian economics in the 1920s and 1930s, the dominating intellectual force in the economics departments of Germany and Austria was the so-called Historical School. The representatives of this school of thought despised economic theory for its advocacy of universally valid economic laws. They argued that laws could only be as universal as the conditions to which they referred. Since history was a process of constant transformation of the conditions of human existence, there could be no such thing as general economic law. At best, there could only be "laws" describing the economy of a more or less unique period and, at any rate, all insights about this economy had to be derived from studies of concrete households, firms, administrations, towns, etc.

Moreover, Strigl's department at the University of Vienna was a stronghold of antirationalist "organic" economics. This contrasted sharply with the approach of the Austrian economists who sought to explain economic phenomena as resulting from individual action and from the social interaction of individuals (the principle of methodological individualist). Single-handedly, Strigl made an effective case for economic theory and methodological individualism in this intellectually hostile environment. Strigl was primarily interested in the scientific foundation of policy proposals, an interest he shared with Ludwig von Mises. This concern for practical questions incited him to take particular care of methodological problems, and he was very effective in integrating methodological studies into his research. All in all, Bohm-Bawerk had the most lasting impact on Strigl, but the ideas of Walras, Wieser, Schumpeter, and Mises also found their way into his writings.

== Work ==
Strigl was the author of pioneering studies on economic theory, applied economics, capital theory, and the relationship between theoretical and historical research. His work Capital and Production was as a key contribution to technical economic theory. It was first published in 1934 by the former Austrian Institute for Business Cycle Research in its series "Contributions to Business Cycle Research." In his book Capital and production, he links Eugen von Böhm-Bawerk production theory and Ludwig von Mises business cycle theory, and gives a pathbreaking account of the role of consumer goods within the structure of production.

Strigl seeks to come to grips with the causes and possible cures for the Great Depression that Plagued the Western world in the aftermath of 1929. Although many other Austrian economists of the time were engaged in similar projects, Strigl's work stands out for its analysis of time-consuming roundabout production processes and their relevance for the Great Depression.

Strigl combined William Stanley Jevons and Eugen von Böhm-Bawerk theory of capital into genuinely Austrian theory of the economy as a whole; and he carefully analyzed the impact of credit expansion on the workings of this macroeconomy. His treatment of these issues in even more systematic, rigorous, and clear than the well-known works by Hayek which covered the same ground. In fact, Hayek hailed Strigl's work "for the simplicity and clarity of exposition of a notoriously difficult subject."

== Later years ==
Strigl's works later almost fell into obscurity. Mises left for Switzerland where he found a prestigious position that would allow him to write his magnum opus. Hayek, Machlup, and Haberler departed for the United Kingdom or the United States, where they could obtain academic positions foreclosed to them back home. And after the 1939 Anschluß, many others left because Nazi Austria made life unbearable for Jews like Morgenstern and for all non-Jews who could not find or accept any modus vivendi with the National Socialist German Workers Party.

Although Strigl had remained as the last member of this group at the original home of the School, for him too, life and work had become unbearable. His health was gravely affected and he was disgusted by the opportunistic behavior of many of his countrymen. Josef Steindl wrote at the time: "Since the invasion of Austria he has been silent; we have not heard of any further publication of his. This is not surprising to those who knew him, and it is probably not only due to an illness which befell him in 1930. The spectacle of the conversion overnight of so many to a new creed was not congenial to him who had so conspicuously lacked the talents of a careerist in all his professional life."

== Works ==
- von Strigl, Richard (1923). Die Okonomifschen Kategorien und die Organisation der Wirtschaft (EBook) (in German). Jena: Verlag von Gustav Fischer.
- von Strigl, Richard (2000). Hülsmann, Jörg Guido (ed.). Capital & Production (EBook). The Ludwig von Mises Institute. ISBN 0945466315.

== Sources ==
- As of this edit, this article uses content from "Biography of Richard von Strigl (1891–1942)", which is licensed in a way that permits reuse under the Creative Commons Attribution-ShareAlike 3.0 Unported License, but not under the GFDL. All relevant terms must be followed. by Jörg Guido Hülsmann, senior fellow of the Mises Institute.
