= William H. Peterson =

American economist (1921–2012)

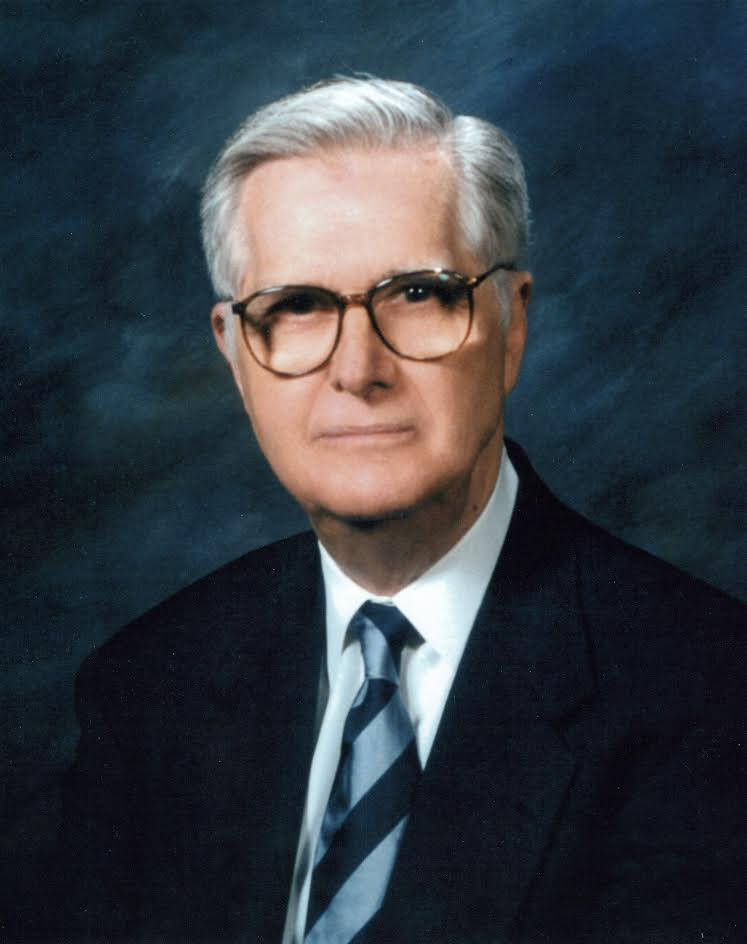
- Born: February 26, 1921
- Died: June 19, 2012

William Herbert Peterson (February 26, 1921 – June 2012) was an American economist who wrote on the insights of Ludwig von Mises through teaching, writing, and speaking on the relationship between free enterprise and human liberty.

== Education ==
Peterson earned a B.S. (1943) and Ph.D. (1952) degrees in economics from New York University and an M.S. degree from Columbia University (1948). During World War II, he also studied at the Harvard Business School under Navy sponsorship and attended a summer leave seminar at Oxford University.

During his academic career, Peterson served as assistant to the dean, associate professor, and professor of economics in the Graduate School of Business Administration at New York University, where he was a colleague and friend of Ludwig von Mises, John David Campbell, professor of American business in the American Graduate School of International Management in Arizona, Scott L. Probasco. Jr., professor of free enterprise and director, Center for Economic Education, the University of Tennessee at Chattanooga; Distinguished Burrows T. and Mabel L. Lundy Emeritus Professor of Business Philosophy at Campbell University in North Carolina, and a senior fellow at The Heritage Foundation, where he served as adjunct scholar.

== Career ==
His experience in business and government included service as Economist and Assistant to the Chairman of the Finance Committee of the United States Steel Corporation, Senior Economic Advisor to the United States Department of Commerce, and economics speechwriter on the campaign staff of Richard Nixon. Peterson has served as a consultant for General Electric, General Motors, Republic of the Ivory Coast, Republic of South Vietnam, Time Magazine, Union Carbide, Manufacturers-Hanover Trust, and Southern Company, and other companies.

In January 1979, Peterson was appointed to be a member of the Federal Drafting Committee of the National Tax Limitation Committee. Led by Nobel Laureate economist Milton Friedman, this committee composed a draft of a constitutional amendment to limit the growth of the Federal budget.

In 1982, Peterson was sponsored by the U.S. Information Agency to lecture on supply-side economics in Romania, East Germany, Ireland and Canada. For this effort, he won a letter of commendation from President Ronald Reagan.

In 1961, the McKinsey Foundation awarded first prize to Peterson for the best article of the year, "The Case for a North American Common Market," published in Indiana University's Business Horizons. In 1981, the Freedom Foundation at Valley Forge gave Dr. Peterson the Leavey Award for Excellence in Private Enterprise Education. In 1989, the Association of Private Enterprise Education named Dr. Peterson as Distinguished Scholar. In 1990, the Freedoms Foundation at Valley Forge awarded him the George Washington Medal of Honor. In 1991 he was awarded an honorary degree by Universidad Francisco Marroquin in Guatemala. In 1993, Campbell University conferred on him the Dean's Award for Excellence in Teaching.

In 2005, Peterson was awarded the Gary G. Schlarbaum Award for Lifetime Achievement in the Cause of Human Liberty, awarded by the Ludwig von Mises Institute where he was an adjunct scholar.

== Writings and speeches ==
Peterson published articles in the Harvard Business Review, The Freeman, The Free Market, Washington Times, Monthly Labor Review, The Christian Science Monitor, New York Times, Dun's Review, Business Week, Journal of Business, Journal of Economic Literature, Nihon Keizai Shimbun (Tokyo), Die 24t, Farmand (Oslo), Australian (Sydney), Sunday Times (London), and others. He wrote daily articles on Mises.org, and is the author of two tributes to Ludwig von Mises: "Thoughts and Memories" and "Mises: A Turning Point".

For fourteen years, he wrote a regular column for the Wall Street Journal entitled "Reading for Business." Apart from authoring monographs and books including The Great Farm Problem (1959), he contributed entries to McGraw-Hill's Encyclopedia of Economics (1982, 1992). He has appeared as a guest commentator on the national PBS-TV show, Nightly Business Report. He was a member of the "Brain Trust" contributing a column to the Investor's Business Daily.

Peterson generally wrote about economics, education, and politics. He praised capitalism quite often and stressed its necessity for a thriving society, such as in his The Washington Times article "Capitalism Appraised". Peterson also voiced his concern for present-day education standards in writings such as his article in The Free Market titled "School Values, Public and Private", where he states that "America's worry over a general moral erosion in politics and society has coincided with ever-more draconian federal control over education." Many of his writings overlapped in his topics of interest, mixing education with government and relating government to economics and capitalism.

Peterson lectured at the University of the Americas (Mexico City), Harvard University, Princeton University, University of Arizona, University of Connecticut, University of Virginia, Florida State University, Chattanooga State, Northwood Institute, Emory and Henry College, Peace College, Lenoir-Rhyne College, Wellesley College, University of New Hampshire, and others, including various professional and trade associations. Many of his speeches discussed topics regarding the Austrian school of economics, following the ideas of Mises.

== List of works ==
=== Business ===
- Is Business "Administration?," 1981
- Getting Results with Information, May 28, 1992: THe Washington Times

=== Economics ===
- Who Also Pays Business Taxes?, Heritage Foundation and the Mises Institute
- The Bookshelf: How to Curb Competition WHile Trying to Spur It, March 1, 1936: The Wall Street Journal
- The Legacy of Lord Keynes, September 14, 1959: British Society for Individual Freedom: Freedom First
- Peterson's 'Law': An economist's foray into the nature of money and the declining value thereof, November 1959: Challenge: The Magazine of Economic Affairs, vol. 8, no. 2
- Automation and Unemployment – An Oft-Exploded Myth Revives, March 5, 1962: Barron's
- The Other Revolution of '76, Fall 1973: Modern Age
- Who is the Real Employer? – The True Source of Jobs, 1976: Chamber of Commerce of the United States
- In Defense of Millionaires, February 1981: The Freeman
- Defending the Rich, October 16, 1986: The Chattanooga Times
- The Free Market Reader, 1988: Mises Institute
- Take a Hard Look At Transfers, Spring 1990: The Campbell Entrepreneur, vol. 13, no. 1
- The Business Outlook: Short War – Short Recession, February 13, 1991: Anchor Financial Group Meeting – Raleigh, NC
- America's Second Democracy, April 4, 1991: Campbell University Honors Banquet
- Bulging Budget Transfers, June 29, 1992: The Washington Times
- Capital Day, 1998, May 1998: The Free Market, vol. 16, no. 5
- Free Markets: The Status Quo vs. America's Other Democracy, January 23, 1999: CaptiveAire meeting – Tulsa, OK
- Free Trade and Capitalism: America's Other Democracy, April 1, 1999: Vital Speeches of the Day, vol. 65, no. 12
- Drumbeat Against Capitalism, August 2, 1999: Investor's Business Daily
- The Golden Rule and the Free Market, c. 2000
- Economic Freedom Spreads Globally As Adam Smith's lessons Take Hold, April 10, 2000: Investor's Business Daily
- Capitalism Appraised: A new look at mankind's greatest achievement, July 3, 2001: The Washington Times
- WHP Remarks, Capital Research Center, April 9, 2002: The Free Market, vol. 20, no. 9
- Capitalism: The Greatest Charity, September 2002: The Free Market, vol. 20, no. 9
- When Government Is the Problem, January 26, 2003: The Washington Times
- America's Greatest Democracy, July 29, 2003
- The Meaning of Market Democracy, December 2003: The Free Market, vol. 21, no. 12
- A Self-Defeating System: The problem with welfare, December 9, 2003: The Washington Times
- Seven Principles of Sound Public Policy, March 2004: Economic Club of Detroit
- The Power to Destroy, April 1, 2004
- Free to Prosper: Ranking countries' liberty and growth, August 31, 2004: The Washington Times
- The Democracy of the Market, November 2005: The Free Market, vol. 26, no. 11
- Economics in One Lesson: With Apologies to Henry Hazlitt, August 28, 2006: Shaftesbury Conference (John Locke Foundation)
- World Peace Through World Trade, November 20, 2006
- Disenfranchising America's Great Democracy, March 29, 2007
- Peterson's Law of Inflation, August 28, 2007
- America's Other Democracy: Politics and Economics at Work, April 3, 2008
- Two Manifestos, Two Revolutions, August 5, 2008
- Anti-State, Anti-War, Pro-Market, June 24, 2009: The Washington Times
- The Accelerator and Say's Law, December 8, 2011: On Freedom and Free Enterprise: Essays in Honor of Ludwig von Mises (1956)
- Capitalism: Our Greatest Charity and Democracy
- Forward with Uneconomics?
- Peterson's Law: Featuring America's Other Democracy and the Forgotten Man
- Peterson's Law: Or Why Things Go Wrong
- Postal Status Quo or Ayn Rand Millenium?
- Who Really Pays Business Taxes?

=== Education ===
- School Values, Public and Private, April 1997: The Free Market, vol. 15, no. 4
- Public Education's Cardinal Sin, April 22, 2003: Campbell University
- Leave No Child Behind: Capitalism reform in education, January 27, 2004: The Washington Times

=== Entrepreneurship ===
- Entrepreneurship, the Possible Dream, November 1985: The Freeman

=== Morals ===
- Natural Law and Its Law-Breaker Extraordinary, February 26, 2004
- Mencken vs. Lincoln, April 14, 2009

=== Politics ===
- The Greatest Show on Earth, August 11, 1956: Time & Tide
- Should We Trade With the Communists?, April 1956: Harvard Business Review, vol. 37, no. 2
- The Taproots of Political Corruption, December 1990: The Freeman
- A Dictionary of Conservative and Libertarian Thought (Reviewed by Peterson), May 1992: The Freeman
- Imperial Rights Regimen, July 16, 1992: The Washington Times
- Stoning Nixon, May 1996
- Rational Ignorance or Citizenship Education, November 6, 1997: Dallas Fed Lunch
- Remarks to Marriott Ballston (VA) Residents, June 14, 2001
- The Forgotten Man: How Americans Fare in Their Two Democracies, June 22, 2002: A Strategy for High Schoolers—Young America's Foundation, Arlington, VA
- Freedom and Prosperity: Together, they are the coming thing, December 17, 2002: The Washington Times
- Huffington turned by the tide: Author takes selective swipes at America's greedy, February 26, 2003: The Washington Times
- Strange bedfellows: The liaison between politics and science, November 4, 2003: The Washington Times
- Constitutional Rights?: Preserving the Founders' Intent, April 20, 2004: The Washington Times
- America's Other Democracy, November 5, 2004
- The Muddle of the Road, November 10, 2004
- Back to basics: America's democratic origins, December 27, 2004: The Washington Times
- The Endless Muddle East Imbroglio: Perpetual War for Perpetual Peace?, August 24, 2006
- Legacy Lost: GOP's big government, February 27, 2007: The Washington Times
- More Liberty Means Less Government: Our Founders Knew This Well (reviewed by Peterson)

=== On Mises ===
- Ludwig von Mises: Thoughts and Memories, 1971: Toward Liberty (Institute of Humane Studies)
- Memories of Ludwig von Mises, May 1987: The Free Market (Mises Institute)
- Discovering Mises: A Turning Point, November 13, 2003
- Mises in New York, October 8, 2005: The Economics of Fascism
- Mises in America, 2009

=== Miscellaneous ===
- One Harlem, Then the Other, August 11, 1984: The New York Times
- The Pilgrims' Turkey of an Idea, November 21, 1990
- For Dancers Only: Remembering Swing, April 1994: Chronicles
