= Frederick Nymeyer =

American businessman (1897–1981)

Frederick Nymeyer (November 12, 1897 – February 18, 1981) was an industrialist from South Holland, Illinois, and a vocal advocate of early libertarianism and Austrian economics.

Nymeyer founded the Libertarian Press and was largely responsible for bringing the economic writings of Eugen von Böhm-Bawerk to the United States. A personal friend of Ludwig von Mises, Nymeyer was also an eager proponent of Austrian economics.

His writings evidence both a commitment to free market principles and a devotion to his Dutch Calvinist faith. His most thorough work, Minimal Religion, posits the incompatibility of socialist ethics with the Christian faith. In Social Action, Hundred Nineteen, he argued forcefully against the social gospel. Progressive Calvinism, later renamed First Principles in Morality and Economics, was a periodical authored by Nymeyer. Directed primarily at an audience of Dutch Reformed youth, the publication linked Christian principles to libertarian political theory.

Nymeyer's writings also touch on theological ideas. In the heated debate over Common Grace, Nymeyer sided against the official position of his denomination (Christian Reformed Church), accepting instead a position similar to that advocated by Herman Hoeksema and the Protestant Reformed Churches.
