= KTM Freeride =

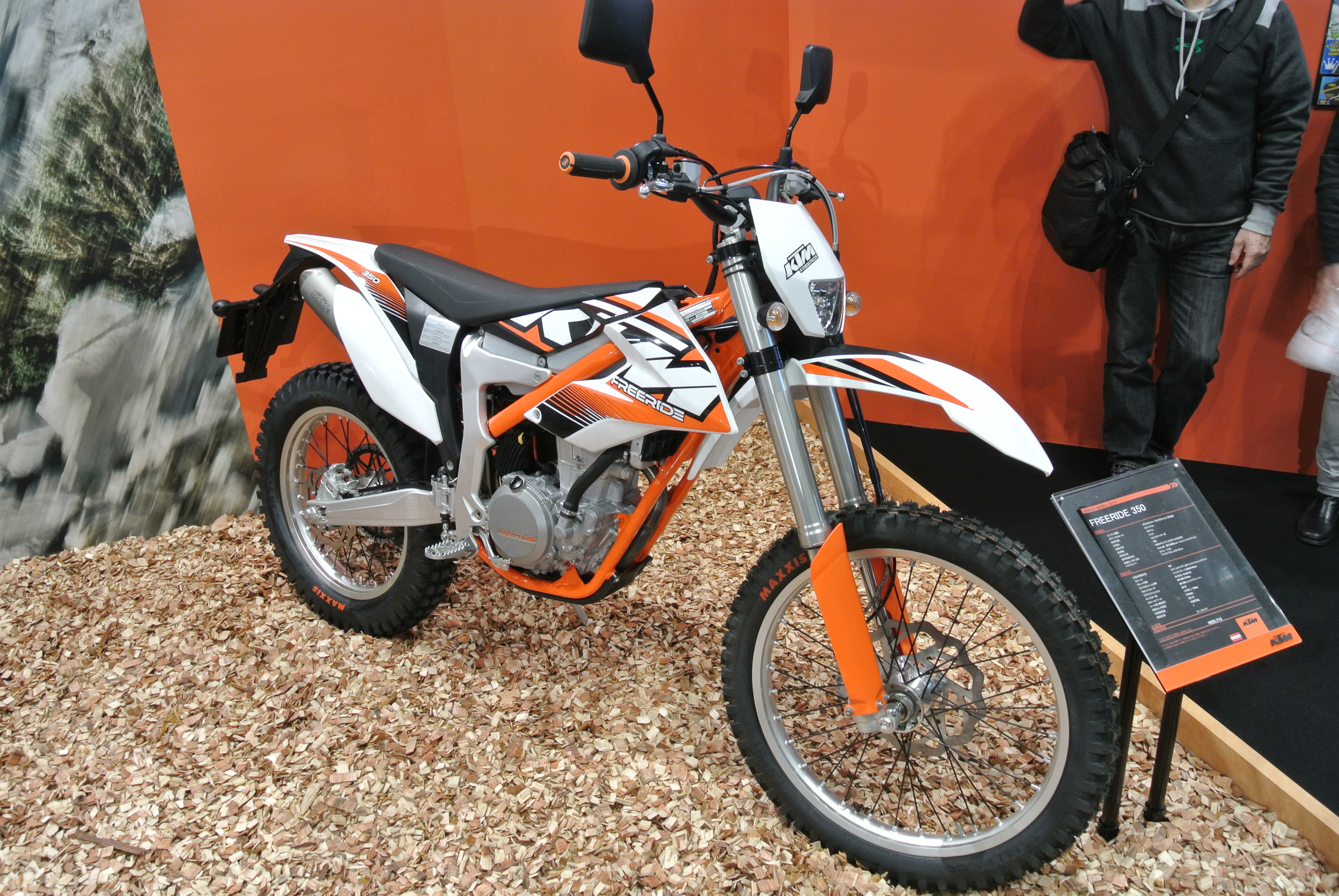
- Freeride 350 at the 2014 Tokyo Motorcycle Show
- Manufacturer: KTM
- Production: 2012–present
- Assembly: Austria

The KTM Freeride is a family of off-road motorcycles produced by the Austrian motorcycle manufacturer KTM since 2012, with different types of engines, four-stroke, two-stroke and electric.

== Overview ==
The Freeride motorcycle are for mountaineering, but the electric version (E-XC) is also made available in a race-ready mountaineering version (E-SX) and as a motard (E-SM); they are characterized by a perimeter frame made in two materials, steel and aluminum, where the vertical beam that goes from the swingarm pin is in aluminum, while the beams and the cradle are in steel, the swingarm is also in aluminum and the connection with the shock absorber / rear suspension is of the linkage type.

The braking system is of the disc type, with daisy discs and radial brake calipers, the engines have the characteristic of being very usable and linear in their delivery, even at the expense of maximum power.

== Engines ==
- Electric, produced since 2014, the motor is of the synchronous type with permanent magnets
- 250, produced since 2013, the engine is a two-stroke
- 350, produced since 2012, the engine is a four-stroke
