= Eugen von Böhm-Bawerk =

Austrian economist (1851–1914)

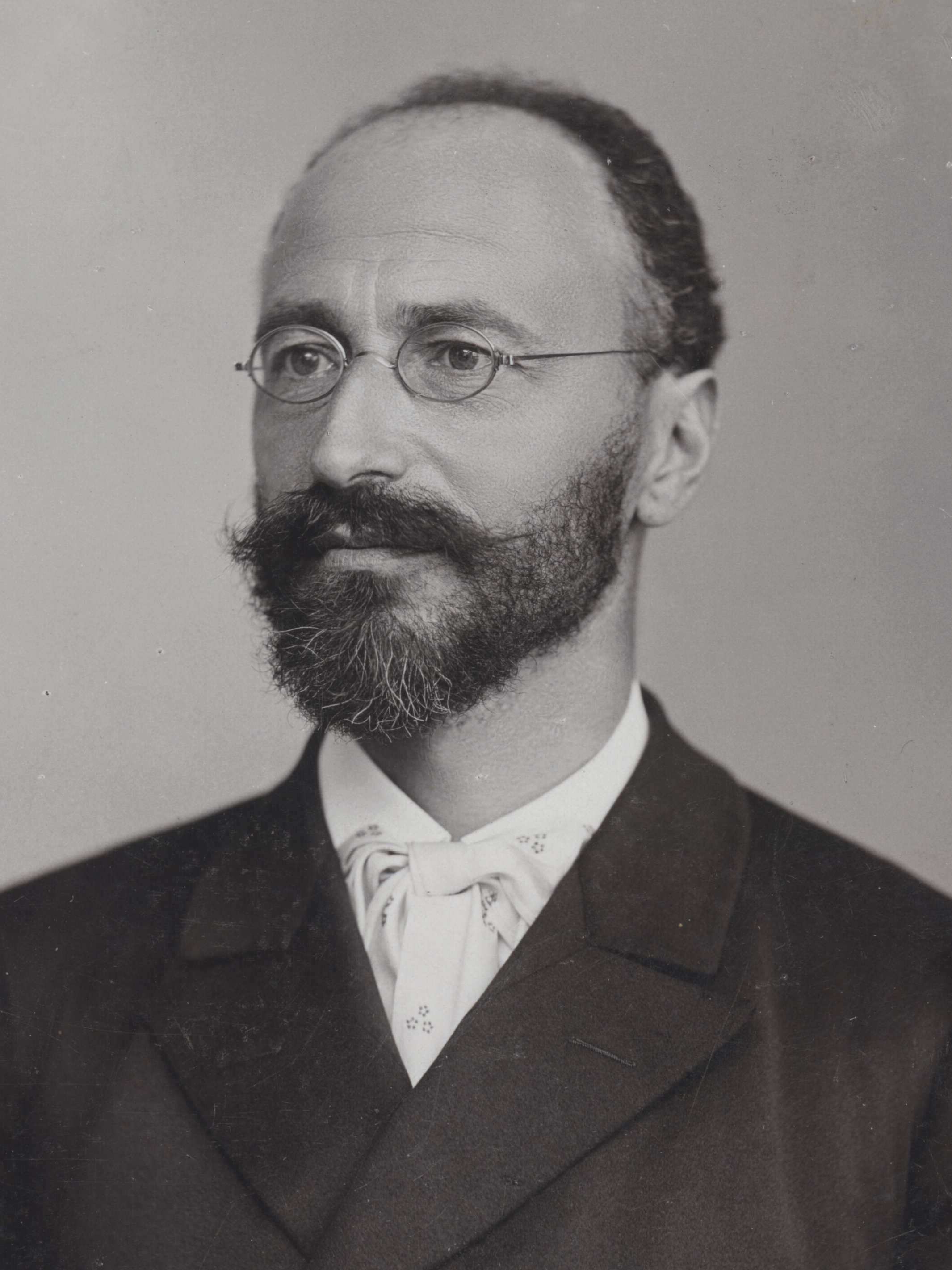
- 1896 portrait
- Born: Eugen Böhm; 12 February 1851; Brno, Austrian Empire
- Died: 27 August 1914 (aged 63); Kramsach, Austria-Hungary

Academic background
- Education: University of Heidelberg; University of Leipzig; University of Jena; University of Vienna
- Doctoral advisor: Karl Knies, Wilhelm Roscher, Bruno Hildebrand
- Influences: Carl Menger

Academic work
- Discipline: Political economics
- School or tradition: Austrian School
- Notable students: Joseph Schumpeter, Ludwig von Mises, Henryk Grossman
- Notable ideas: Roundaboutness; Time preference Criticism of Karl Marx's exploitation theory

Eugen Böhm Ritter von Bawerk (short form: Eugen von Böhm-Bawerk, Austrian German: [fɔn bøːm ˈbaːvɛrk]; born Eugen Böhm, 12 February 1851 – 27 August 1914) was an Austrian-school intellectual and political economist who served intermittently as the Minister of Finance of Austria between 1895 and 1904. Böhm-Bawerk is noted for the theory of Roundaboutness, which emphasizes the time intensity, not only capital intensity, of investments in capital goods to increase productivity. He advanced an interest rate theory centered on time preference. He also wrote an extensive critique of Marxism and Marx's labor theory of value.

== Biography ==
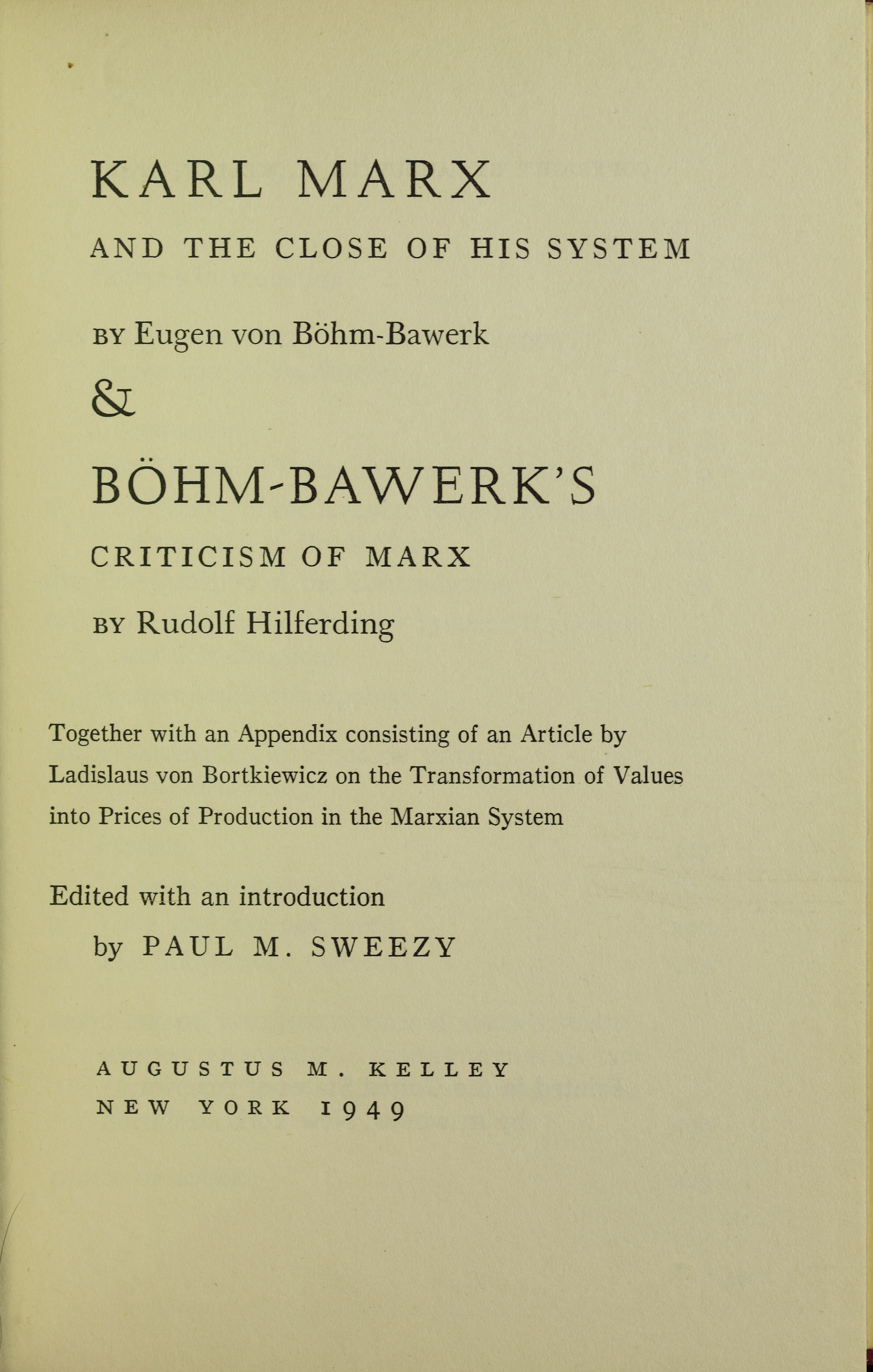
Frontispiece of Karl Marx and the close of his system

Eugen Böhm was born on 12 February 1851 in Brno (German: Brünn), Moravia, Austrian Empire. While studying to be a lawyer at the University of Vienna, Böhm-Bawerk read Carl Menger's Principles of Economics and became an adherent of his theories, although he never studied under him. Joseph Schumpeter saw Böhm-Bawerk as "so completely the enthusiastic disciple of Menger that it is hardly necessary to look for other influences." During his time at the Vienna University, he became good friends with Friedrich von Wieser, who later became his brother-in-law. After Vienna, he studied political economy and social science at the universities of Heidelberg, Leipzig and Jena, under Karl Knies, Wilhelm Roscher and Bruno Hildebrand.

After completing his studies in 1872, he entered the Austrian Ministry of Finance, holding various posts until 1880, when he became qualified as a Privatdozent of political economy at Vienna. The following year, however, he transferred his services to the University of Innsbruck, where he remained until 1889, becoming a professor in 1884. During this time, he published the first two out of the three volumes of his masterpiece, Capital and Interest.

In 1889 Böhm-Bawerk became a counsellor in the Ministry of Finance in Vienna and represented the government in the lower house on all questions of taxation. He drafted a proposal for direct-tax reform. The Austrian system at the time taxed production heavily, especially during wartime, which resulted in huge disincentives to investment. Böhm-Bawerk's proposal called for a modern income tax, which was soon approved and met with success in the next few years.

Böhm-Bawerk briefly became Austrian Minister of Finance in 1895. After a second brief period in the position, after his third appointment to the post he remained in it from 1900 to 1904. There he fought continually for strict maintenance of the legally fixed gold standard and a balanced budget. In 1902 he eliminated the sugar subsidy, which had been a feature of the Austrian economy for nearly two centuries. He resigned in 1904, when increased fiscal demands from the army threatened to unbalance the budget. The economic historian Alexander Gerschenkron criticized his "penny pinching, 'not-one-heller-more policies'," and criticised Böhm-Bawerk's unwillingness to spend heavily on public works. Joseph Schumpeter praised Böhm-Bawerk's efforts toward "the financial stability of the country." His image appeared on the one-hundred schilling banknote from 1984 until the euro was introduced in 2002.

In 1897, Böhm-Bawerk became Ambassador to the German court. In 1899, he was elevated to the upper chamber (House of Peers). In 1907 he became vice-president and in 1911 president of the Austrian Academy of Sciences.

He wrote extensive critiques of Karl Marx's economics in the 1880s and 1890s, and several prominent Marxists—including Rudolf Hilferding—attended his seminar in 1905–06. He returned to teaching in 1904, with a chair at the University of Vienna. His many students there included Joseph Schumpeter, Ludwig von Mises and Henryk Grossman. He died in 1914.

George Reisman has called him the second most important Austrian economist "after Ludwig von Mises." And further:

[It's] entirely conceivable to me that Mises might have described Böhm-Bawerk as the most important Austrian economist.

== Published work ==
The first volume of Capital und Capitalzins (Capital and Interest), which Ludwig von Mises decreed to be "the most eminent contribution to modern economic theory," was entitled Geschichte und Kritik der Capitalzinstheorien (sometimes referred to as History and Critique of Interest Theories, translated in 1890 as A Critical History of Economical Theory) (Universitätsverlag Wagner, 1884). It is an exhaustive study of the alternative treatments of interest: use theories, productivity theories, abstinence theories, and so on.

Included is a critique of Marx's exploitation theory. Böhm-Bawerk argued that capitalists do not exploit their workers; they actually help employees by providing them with an income well in advance of the revenue from the goods they produce, stating, "Labor cannot increase its share at the expense of capital." In particular, he argued that the Marxist theory of exploitation ignores the dimension of time in production, which he discussed in his theory of roundaboutness, and that a redistribution of profits from capitalist industries will undermine the importance of the interest rate as a vital tool for monetary policy. From this criticism it follows, according to Böhm-Bawerk, that the whole value of a product is not produced by the worker, but that labor can only be paid at the present value of any foreseeable output.

Karl Marx and the Close of His System (1896) examined Marx's analysis of value, claiming the basic error in Marx's system to have resulted from a self-contradiction of Marx's law of value, namely how the rate of profit and the prices of production of the third volume of Marx's Capital contradict Marx's theory of value in the first volume. He also attacks Marx for downplaying the influence of supply and demand in determining permanent price, and for deliberate ambiguity with such concepts.

In the first chapter of the first volume of Capital, Karl Marx proposed that the value of any commodity was generally reflected by the quantity of labor required, inequality being only a temporary exception. This therefore means that the level of value generated is completely independent of the quantity of capital of a company. In other words, the organic composition of capital (i.e. the ratio between the quantity of capital and the quantity of labor) of a company has no impact on the profits generated. However, the Marxist economist Conrad Schmidt argued that statistical analysis shows the level of profit is proportional to the quantity of capital of the company. Faced with this paradox, Karl Marx explains in the third volume of Capital that after production, capitalists will reallocate their capital towards companies having made the highest rates of surplus value until the rate of surplus value stabilizes for all companies in a sector of production (since capital is not a source of value and therefore of profit for Marx). Thus, the prices of goods will go from 'induced' by the value of labor to price of production (the sum of wages and annual profits), "The value and price of the commodity coincide only accidentally and exceptionally." However, Böhm-Bawerk points out the contradiction formulated with the relation between the value and the price of the good in the first volume, thus, the Marxist theory appears contradictory and the labor theory of value illogical.

Böhm-Bawerk's Positive Theorie des Kapitals (Universitätsverlag Wagner, 1889) (translated by William Smart as Positive Theory of Capital (1892)), offered as the second volume of Capital and Interest, elaborated on the economy's time-consuming production processes and the interest payments they entail. Further Essays on Capital and Interest (1921) was the third volume, which originated with appendices to the second volume. Book III (part of the second volume), Value and Price, develops Menger's ideas of marginal utility outlined in his Principles of Economics, to argue that the idea of subjective value is related to marginalism, in that things only have value insofar as people want such goods. To illustrate the principle, Böhm-Bawerk used the practical example of a farmer who is left with five sacks of corn after harvest to provide for his needs until the next harvest:

Being a thrifty soul he lays his plans for the employment of these sacks over the year. One sack he absolutely requires for the sustenance of his life till the next harvest. A second he requires to supplement this bare living to the extent of keeping himself hale and vigorous. More corn than this, in the shape of bread and farinaceous food generally, he has no desire for. On the other hand, it would be very desirable to have some animal food, and he sets aside, therefore, a third sack to feed poultry. A fourth sack he destines for the making of coarse spirits. Suppose... that he cannot think of anything better to do with the fifth sack than feed a number of parrots, whose antics amuse him. Naturally these various methods of employing the corn are not equal in importance.... And now, putting ourselves in imagination at the standpoint of the farmer, we ask, What in these circumstances will be the importance, as regards his well-being, of one sack of corn? ... How much utility will he lose if a sack of corn gets lost? Suppose we carry out this in detail. Evidently our farmer would not be very wise if he thought of deducting the lost sack from his own consumption, and imperilled his health and life while using the corn as before to make brandy and feed parrots. On consideration we must see that only one course is conceivable: with the four sacks that remain our farmer will provide for the four most urgent groups of wants, and give up only the satisfaction of the last and least important, the marginal utility—in this case, the keeping of parrots.

Böhm-Bawerk's critique of Marx's theories was criticized by Marxian economist Nikolai Bukharin. In his Economic Theory of the Leisure Class (1927), Bukharin argued Böhm-Bawerk's positions "express the bankruptcy of bourgeois political economy" and "ignores the historical element entirely". By contrast, Austrian economists have regarded Böhm-Bawerk's critique of Marx as definitive.

Many of Böhm-Bawerk's works were brought out in the United States by the Chicago industrialist and avid libertarian Frederick Nymeyer, through Libertarian Press, the US arm of the Austrian School of Economics.

Between 1880 and 1947 Böhm-Bawerk worked on the imputation theory first explained by Carl Menger between 1840 and 1921. It states that factor prices are determined by output prices. Böhm-Bawerk provided a variation of the theory that targeted the entrepreneurs, breaking up into three cases: 1. where the factor combination a + b exists such that neither a nor b as isolated piece produces any value at all. Thus if a or b were to be a loss, the other part of the "group" becomes wholly valueless. This implies that every factor can have the value of the whole group or alternatively can have no value (Kauder 179). 2. Where the combination a + b + c exists such that every piece has alternatively two values with a low utility or a lower utility. Then the two values are considered the maximum and minimum. Where a maximum is the group value and the minimum is the value of each individual entity being utilized separately. "Assume that the remaining glove can be used for polishing silverware. Then the maximum is the value of the whole pair minus the use as a polisher, and the minimum is the value as a polisher" (Kauder 179). 3. This just states how two complementary goods can find employment outside the original combination and the original combination can be preserved by replacing productive elements, which have been lost with other factors.

=== Bibliography ===
- Böhm-Bawerk, Eugen von (1881). Rechte und Verhältnisse vom Standpunkt der volkswirtschaftlichen Güterlehre (in German). Innsbruck: Wagnersche Universitäts-Buchhandlung.
- Böhm-Bawerk, Eugen von (1884). Kapital und Kapitalzins (in German). Innsbruck: Wagner'schen Universitäts-Buchhandlung.
- Böhm-Bawerk, Eugen von (1890). Capital and Interest, a critical history of economical theory. Translated by Smart, William. London, New York: Macmillan and Co.
- Böhm-Bawerk, Eugen von (1890). The Ultimate Standard of Value. Philadelphia: American Academy of Political and Social Science.
- Böhm-Bawerk, Eugen von; Knies, Carl; Boenigk, Otto Freiherr von (1896). Festgaben für Karl Knies zur fünfundsiebzigsten Wiederkehr seines Geburtstages in dankbarer Verehrung dargebracht von Eugen v. Böhm-Bawerk ... O.v. Boenigk ... J.B. Clark ... [u.a.] [microform] (in German). Berlin: O. Haering.
- Böhm-Bawerk, Eugen von (1898). Karl Marx and the Close of His System: A Criticism. Translated by Macdonald, Alice M. London: T. Fisher Unwin.
- Böhm-Bawerk, Eugen von (1900). Einige strittige Fragen der Capitalstheorie: Drei Abhandlungen (in German). Wien: W. Braumüller.
- Böhm-Bawerk, Eugen von; Scott, William A.; Feilbogen, Siegmund (1903). Recent Literature on Interest. New York: MacMillan.
- Böhm-Bawerk, Eugen von; Metz, John R. (2010) [1914]. Control or Economic Law. Ludwig von Mises Institute. ISBN 978-1933550718.
- Böhm-Bawerk, Eugen von (1921). Positive Theorie des Kapitals. 1. (Buch I–IV) (in German). Jena: G. Fischer.
- Böhm-Bawerk, Eugen von (1923). The Positive Theory of Capital. Translated by Smart, William. New York: G.E. Stechert.

== See also ==
- List of Austrian scientists
- List of Austrians
