= Schools of economic thought =

Groups who share a common perspective

In the history of economic thought, a school of economic thought is a group of economic thinkers who share or shared a mutual perspective on the way economies function. While economists do not always fit within particular schools, particularly in the modern era, classifying economists into schools of thought is common. Economic thought may be roughly divided into three phases: premodern (Greco-Roman, Indian, Persian, Islamic, and Imperial Chinese), early modern (mercantilist, physiocrats) and modern (beginning with Adam Smith and classical economics in the late 18th century, and Karl Marx and Friedrich Engels' Marxian economics in the mid 19th century). Systematic economic theory has been developed primarily since the beginning of what is termed the modern era.

Currently, the vast majority of economists follow an approach known as mainstream economics (sometimes called 'orthodox economics'). Economists generally specialize into either macroeconomics, broadly on the general scope of the economy as a whole, or microeconomics, on specific markets or actors.

Within the macroeconomic mainstream in the United States, distinctions can be made between saltwater economists (Note: Saltwater economists are generally associated with Cornell, Berkeley, Harvard, MIT, Princeton, and Yale) and the more laissez-faire ideas of freshwater economists. (Note: Freshwater economists generally hail from the interior of the nation, represented by the Chicago school of economics, Carnegie Mellon University, the University of Rochester and the University of Minnesota) However, there is broad agreement on the importance of general equilibrium, the methodology related to models used for certain purposes (e.g. statistical models for forecasting, structural models for counterfactual analysis, etc.), and the importance of partial equilibrium models for analyzing specific factors important to the economy (e.g. banking).

Some influential approaches of the past, such as the historical school of economics and institutional economics, have become defunct or have declined in influence, and are now considered heterodox approaches. Other longstanding heterodox schools of economic thought include Austrian economics. Some more recent developments in economic thought, such as feminist economics and ecological economics, adapt and critique mainstream approaches, emphasizing particular issues rather than developing as independent schools of thought.

== Contemporary economic thought ==
=== Mainstream economics ===
Mainstream economics is distinguished from heterodox approaches and schools within economics. It begins with the premise that resources are scarce and that choices must be made among competing alternatives. That is, economics deals with tradeoffs. With scarcity, choosing one alternative implies forgoing another alternative—the opportunity cost. The opportunity cost expresses an implicit relationship between competing alternatives. Such costs, treated as prices in a market economy, are used to analyze economic efficiency or to predict responses to market disturbances. In a planned economy, comparable shadow price relations must be satisfied for the efficient use of resources, as first demonstrated by the Italian economist Enrico Barone.

Economists believe that incentives and costs play a pervasive role in shaping decision making. An immediate example of this is the consumer theory of individual demand, which isolates the effects of prices (as costs) and income on the quantity demanded. Modern mainstream economics has foundations in neoclassical economics, which began to develop in the late 19th century. Mainstream economics also acknowledges the existence of market failure and draws on insights from Keynesian economics, most notably in the macroeconomic new neoclassical synthesis. It uses models of economic growth for analyzing long-run variables affecting national income. It employs game theory for modeling market or non-market behavior. Important insights into collective behavior (for example, the emergence of organizations) have been incorporated into the new institutional economics. A definition that captures much of modern economics is that of Lionel Robbins in a 1932 essay: "the science which studies human behaviour as a relationship between ends and scarce means which have alternative uses." Scarcity means that available resources are insufficient to satisfy all wants and needs. Absent scarcity and alternative uses of available resources, there is no economic problem. The subject thus defined involves the study of choice, as affected by incentives and resources.

Mainstream economics encompasses a wide (but not unbounded) range of views. Politically, most mainstream economists hold views ranging from laissez-faire to modern liberalism. There are also differing views on certain empirical claims within macroeconomics, such as the effectiveness of expansionary fiscal policy under certain conditions.

Disputes within mainstream macroeconomics tend to be characterised by disagreement over the convincingness of individual empirical claims (such as the predictive power of a specific model) and in this respect differ from the more fundamental conflicts over methodology that characterised previous periods (like those between Monetarists and Neo-Keynesians), in which economists of differing schools would disagree on whether a given work was even a legitimate contribution to the field.

=== Contemporary heterodox economics ===
In the late 19th century, several heterodox schools contended with the neoclassical school that arose following the marginal revolution. Most survive to the present day as self-consciously dissident schools, but with greatly diminished size and influence relative to mainstream economics. The most significant are Institutional economics and the Austrian School.

The development of Keynesian economics was a substantial challenge to the dominant neoclassical school of economics. Keynesian views entered the mainstream as a result of the neoclassical synthesis developed by John Hicks. The rise of Keynesianism and its incorporation into mainstream economics reduced the appeal of heterodox schools. However, advocates of a more fundamental critique of neoclassical economics formed a school of post-Keynesian economics.

Heterodox approaches often embody criticisms of perceived "mainstream" approaches. For instance:

- feminist economics criticizes the valuation of labor and argues that female labor is systemically undervalued;
- green economics criticizes instances of externalized and intangible ecosystems and argues for them to be brought into the tangible capital asset model as natural capital; and
- Post-Keynesian economics disagrees with the notion of the long-term neutrality of demand, arguing that there is no natural tendency for a competitive market economy to reach full employment.

Other viewpoints on economic issues from outside mainstream economics include dependency theory and world systems theory in the study of international relations.

==== Modern Major Heterodox Schools ====
- Post Keynesian Economics: This school rejects the neoclassical focus on equilibrium and rational expectations, arguing instead that "fundamental uncertainty" and the dynamics of effective demand and debt are the primary drivers of economic activity.
- Austrian Economics: Characterized by its adherence to methodological individualism and a rejection of mathematical modeling, this school emphasizes the "spontaneously organizing" power of the price mechanism and blames central bank interference in interest rates for the business cycle.
- Islamic Economics: This school identifies as heterodox by replacing the assumption of "rational utility maximization" with a framework governed by Sharia law, centering its macroscopic theory on the prohibition of usury (riba) and the mandatory redistribution of wealth (zakat).

== Historical economic thought ==
Modern macro- and microeconomics are young sciences. But many in the past have thought on topics ranging from value to production relations. These forays into economic thought contribute to the modern understanding, ranging from ancient Greek conceptions of the role of the household and its choices to mercantilism and its emphasis on the hoarding of precious metals.

=== American School ===
The American School owes its origin to the writings and economic policies of Alexander Hamilton, the first Treasury Secretary of the United States. It emphasized high tariffs on imports to help develop the fledgling American manufacturing base and to finance infrastructure projects, as well as National Banking, Public Credit, and government investment into advanced scientific and technological research and development. Friedrich List, one of the most famous proponents of the economic system, named it the National System, and was the main impetus behind the development of the German Zollverein and the economic policies of Germany under Chancellor Otto Von Bismarck beginning in 1879.

- Alexander Hamilton
- John Quincy Adams
- Henry Clay
- Mathew Carey
- Henry Charles Carey
- Abraham Lincoln
- Friedrich List
- Otto Von Bismarck
- Arthur Griffith
- William McKinley

=== Anarchist economics ===
Anarchist economics comprises a set of theories that seek to outline modes of production and exchange not governed by coercive social institutions:

- Mutualists advocate for market socialism with cooperatives, mutual banking, and usufructs.
- Collectivist anarchists advocate for collective ownership, decentralised economic planning, and salaries based on the amount of time contributed to production.
- Anarcho-communists advocate for a direct transition from capitalism to libertarian communism and a gift economy with direct communal decision-making and free association.
- Anarcho-syndicalists advocate for the abolition of wage labour, industrial unionism, and workers' self-management through syndicates.

Thinkers associated with anarchist economics include:

- Charles Fourier
- Pierre-Joseph Proudhon
- Peter Kropotkin
- Mikhail Bakunin
- Josiah Warren
- Lysander Spooner

=== Ancient economic thought ===
- Chanakya (Kautilya)
- Xenophon
- Aristotle
- Qin Shi Huang
- Wang Anshi

=== Austrian School ===
Austrian economists advocate methodological individualism in interpreting economic developments, the subjective theory of value, that money is non-neutral, and emphasize the organizing power of the price mechanism (see Economic calculation debate) and a laissez faire approach to the economy.

- Carl Menger
- Eugen von Böhm-Bawerk
- Ludwig von Mises
- Friedrich Hayek
- Friedrich von Wieser
- Henry Hazlitt
- Frank Fetter
- Israel Kirzner
- Murray Rothbard
- Robert P. Murphy
- Lew Rockwell
- Peter Schiff
- Marc Faber
- Walter Block
- Hans-Hermann Hoppe
- Jesús Huerta de Soto
- Fritz Machlup

=== Carnegie School ===
- Herbert A. Simon
- Richard Cyert
- James March
- Victor Vroom
- Oliver E. Williamson
- John Muth

=== Chicago school ===
The Chicago School is a neoclassical school of economic thought associated with the work of the faculty at the University of Chicago, notable particularly in macroeconomics for developing monetarism as an alternative to Keynesianism and its influence on the use of rational expectations in macroeconomic modelling.

- Frank H. Knight
- Jacob Viner
- Milton Friedman
- Thomas Sowell
- George Stigler
- Harry Markowitz
- Merton Miller
- Robert Lucas, Jr.
- Eugene Fama
- Myron Scholes
- Gary Becker
- Edward C. Prescott
- James Heckman
- Robert Z. Aliber

=== Classical political economy ===
Classical economics, also called classical political economy, was the original form of mainstream economics of the 18th and 19th centuries. Classical economics focuses on the tendency of markets to move to equilibrium and on objective theories of value. Neo-classical economics differs from classical economics primarily in being utilitarian in its value theory and using marginal theory as the basis of its models and equations. Marxian economics also descends from classical theory. Anders Chydenius (1729–1803) was the leading classical liberal of Nordic history. Chydenius, who was a Finnish priest and member of parliament, published a book called The National Gain in 1765, in which he proposes ideas of freedom of trade and industry and explores the relationship between economy and society and lays out the principles of liberalism, all of this eleven years before Adam Smith published a similar and more comprehensive book, The Wealth of Nations. According to Chydenius, democracy, equality, and a respect for human rights were the only ways towards progress and happiness for the whole of society.

- Adam Smith
- Francis Hutcheson
- Bernard de Mandeville
- David Hume
- Henry George
- Thomas Malthus
- James Mill
- Francis Place
- David Ricardo
- Henry Thornton
- John Ramsay McCulloch
- James Maitland, 8th Earl of Lauderdale
- Jeremy Bentham
- Jean Charles Léonard de Sismondi
- Johann Heinrich von Thünen
- John Stuart Mill
- Karl Marx
- Nassau William Senior
- Edward Gibbon Wakefield
- John Rae
- Thomas Tooke
- Robert Torrens

=== Developmentalist economics ===
- Albert O. Hirschman
- Celso Furtado
- Ha-Joon Chang
- Raúl Prebisch
- W. Arthur Lewis

=== Distributism ===
Distributism is an economic philosophy that was originally formulated in the late 19th century and early 20th century by Catholic thinkers to reflect the teachings of Pope Leo XIII's encyclical Rerum Novarum and Pope Pius XI's encyclical Quadragesimo Anno. It seeks a third way between capitalism and socialism, aiming to order society according to Christian principles of justice while preserving private property.

- G. K. Chesterton
- Hilaire Belloc

=== English historical school ===
Although not nearly as famous as its German counterpart, there was also an English Historical School, whose figures included William Whewell, Richard Jones, Thomas Edward Cliffe Leslie, Walter Bagehot, Thorold Rogers, Arnold Toynbee, William Cunningham, and William Ashley. It was this school that heavily critiqued the classical economists' deductive approach, especially the writings of David Ricardo. This school revered the inductive process and called for the merging of historical fact with those of the present period.

- Edmund Burke
- Richard Jones
- Thomas Edward Cliffe Leslie
- Walter Bagehot
- Thorold Rogers
- William J. Ashley
- William Cunningham

=== French Liberal School ===
The French Liberal School (also called the "Optimist School" or "Orthodox School") is a 19th-century school of economic thought centered at the Collège de France and the Institut de France. The Journal des Économistes was instrumental in promulgating the ideas of the school. The school voraciously defended free trade and laissez-faire capitalism. They were primary opponents of collectivist, interventionist, and protectionist ideas. This made the French school a forerunner of the modern Austrian school.

- Frédéric Bastiat
- Maurice Block
- Pierre Paul Leroy-Beaulieu
- Gustave de Molinari
- Yves Guyot
- Jean-Baptiste Say
- Léon Say

=== French historical school ===
- Clément Juglar
- Charles Gide
- Albert Aftalion
- Émile Levasseur
- François Simiand

=== Georgist economics ===
Georgism, or geoism, is an economic philosophy proposing that both individual and national economic outcomes would be improved by the utilization of economic rent arising from control over land and natural resources through levies such as a land value tax.

- Harry Gunnison Brown
- Raymond Crotty
- Ottmar Edenhofer
- Fred Foldvary
- Mason Gaffney
- Henry George
- Max Hirsch (labor economist)
- Wolf Ladejinsky
- Philippe Legrain
- Donald Shoup
- Nicolaus Tideman

=== German Historical school ===
The German historical school of economics was an approach to academic economics and public administration that emerged in 19th-century Germany and held sway there until well into the 20th century. The Historical school held that history was the key source of knowledge about human actions and economic matters, since economics was culture-specific and therefore not generalizable across space and time. The school rejected the universal validity of economic theorems. They saw economics as arising from careful empirical and historical analysis rather than from logic and mathematics. The school preferred historical, political, and social studies to self-referential mathematical modelling. Most members of the school were also Kathedersozialisten, i.e., concerned with social reform and improved conditions for the common person during a period of heavy industrialization. The Historical School can be divided into three tendencies: the Older, led by Wilhelm Roscher, Karl Knies, and Bruno Hildebrand; the Younger, led by Gustav von Schmoller, and also including Étienne Laspeyres, Karl Bücher, Adolph Wagner, and to some extent Lujo Brentano; the Youngest, led by Werner Sombart and including, to a very large extent, Max Weber.

Predecessors included Friedrich List and Adam Müller. The Historical school largely controlled appointments to Chairs of Economics in German universities, as many of the advisors of Friedrich Althoff, head of the university department in the Prussian Ministry of Education from 1882 to 1907, had studied under members of the school. Moreover, Prussia was the intellectual powerhouse of Germany and thus dominated academia not only in central Europe but also in the United States until about 1900, because holders of German Ph.D.s led the American economics profession. The Historical school was involved in the Methodenstreit ("strife over method") with the Austrian School, whose orientation was more theoretical and a prioristic. In English-speaking countries, the Historical school is perhaps the least-known and least-understood approach to the study of economics because it differs radically from the now-dominant Anglo-American analytical point of view. Yet the Historical school forms the basis—both in theory and in practice—of the social market economy, which for many decades has been the dominant economic paradigm in most countries of continental Europe. The Historical school is also a source of Joseph Schumpeter's dynamic, change-oriented, and innovation-based economics. Although his writings could be critical of the School, Schumpeter's work on the role of innovation and entrepreneurship can be seen as a continuation of ideas originated by the Historical School, especially the work of von Schmoller and Sombart.

- Adam Müller
- Friedrich List
- Wilhelm Roscher
- Gustav von Schmoller
- Werner Sombart
- Max Weber
- Joseph Schumpeter
- Karl Polanyi

=== Institutional economics ===
Institutional economics focuses on understanding the roles of evolutionary processes and institutions in shaping economic behaviour. Its original focus lay in Thorstein Veblen's instinct-oriented dichotomy between technology on the one side and the "ceremonial" sphere of society on the other. Its name and core elements trace back to a 1919 American Economic Review article by Walton H. Hamilton.

- Gunnar Myrdal
- Thorstein Veblen
- John Rogers Commons
- Wesley Clair Mitchell
- John Maurice Clark
- Robert A. Brady
- Clarence Edwin Ayres
- Romesh Dutt
- John Kenneth Galbraith
- Geoffrey Hodgson
- Ha-Joon Chang

=== Islamic economics ===
Islamic economics is the practice of economics in accordance with Islamic law. The origins can be traced back to the Caliphate, where an early market economy and some of the earliest forms of merchant capitalism took root between the 8th–12th centuries, which some refer to as "Islamic capitalism".

Islamic economics seeks not only to enforce Islamic regulations on personal matters but also to implement broader economic goals and policies of an Islamic society, with a focus on uplifting the deprived masses. It was founded on the free and unhindered circulation of wealth to reach even the lowest echelons of society handsomely. One distinguishing feature is the wealth tax (in the form of both Zakat and Jizya), and a ban on levying taxes on all kinds of trade and transactions (Income/Sales/Excise/Import/Export duties, etc.). Another distinguishing feature is the prohibition of interest in the form of excess charges on money transactions. Its pronouncement on the use of paper currency also stands out. Though promissory notes are recognized, they must be fully backed by reserves. Fractional-reserve banking is disallowed as a form of breach of trust.

Trade in Islamic societies saw innovations such as trading companies, big businesses, contracts, bills of exchange, long-distance international trade, the first forms of partnership (mufawada) such as limited partnerships (mudaraba), credit, debt, profit, loss, capital (al-mal), and capital accumulation (nama al-mal), circulating capital, capital expenditure, revenue, cheques, promissory notes, trusts (see Waqf), startup companies, savings accounts, transactional accounts, pawning, loaning, exchange rates, bankers, money changers, ledgers, deposits, assignments, the double-entry bookkeeping system, lawsuits, and agency institution.

This school has seen a revived interest in development and understanding since the latter part of the 20th century.

- Muhammad
- Abu Hanifa an-Nu‘man
- Abu Yusuf
- Al-Farabi (Alpharabius)
- Shams al-Mo'ali Abol-hasan Ghaboos ibn Wushmgir (Qabus)
- Ibn Sina (Avicenna)
- Ibn Miskawayh
- Al-Ghazali (Algazel)
- Ibn Taymiyyah
- Al-Mawardi
- Nasīr al-Dīn al-Tūsī (Tusi)
- Ibn Khaldun
- Al-Maqrizi
- Muhammad Baqir al-Sadr

=== Keynesian economics ===
Keynesian economics has developed from the work of John Maynard Keynes and focuses on short-run macroeconomics, particularly the rigidities that arise when prices are fixed. It has two successors. Post-Keynesian economics is an alternative school—one of the successors to the Keynesian tradition—focused on macroeconomics. They concentrate on macroeconomic rigidities and adjustment processes, and research the microfoundations of their models based on real-world practices rather than simple optimizing models. Generally associated with Cambridge, England, and the work of Joan Robinson (see Post-Keynesian economics). New-Keynesian economics is the other school associated with developments in the Keynesian fashion. These researchers tend to share with other Neoclassical economists an emphasis on microfounded models and optimizing behavior, but focus more narrowly on standard Keynesian themes such as price and wage rigidity. These are usually treated as endogenous features of these models, rather than assumed, as in older-style Keynesian ones (see New-Keynesian economics).

- John Maynard Keynes
- Joan Robinson
- Paul Krugman
- Paul Samuelson
- Peter Bofinger
- Joseph Stiglitz
- Nouriel Roubini
- Stanley Fischer
- Gregory Mankiw
- Jason Furman
- Huw Dixon

=== Lausanne School ===
The Lausanne School of Economics is an extension of the neoclassical school of economic thought, named after the University of Lausanne in Switzerland. The school is primarily associated with Léon Walras and Vilfredo Pareto, both of whom held successive professorships in political economy at the university in the latter half of the 19th century. Beginning with Walras, the school is credited with playing a central role in the development of mathematical economics. For this reason, the school has also been referred to as the Mathematical School. A notable work of the Lausanne School is Walras' development of the general equilibrium theory as a holistic means of analysing the economy, in contrast to partial equilibrium theory, which only analyses single markets in isolation. The theory shows how a general equilibrium is reached through the interaction between demand and supply in an economy consisting of multiple markets operating simultaneously.

The Lausanne School is also largely credited with the development of welfare economics, through which Pareto sought to measure an economy's welfare. Contrary to utilitarianism, Pareto found that the welfare of an economy cannot be measured by aggregating the individual utilities of its inhabitants. Since individual utilities are subjective, their measurements may not be directly comparable. This led Pareto to conclude that if at least one person's utility increased while no one else was made worse off, then the economy's welfare would increase. Conversely, if a majority of people experienced an increase in utility while at least one person was worse off, there could be no definitive conclusion about the welfare of the economy. These observations formed the basis of Pareto efficiency, which describes a situation or outcome in which nobody can be made better off without also making someone else worse off. Pareto efficiency is still widely used in contemporary welfare economics as well as game theory.

- Léon Walras
- Vilfredo Pareto

=== Marxian economics ===
Marxian economics descended from the work of Karl Marx and Friedrich Engels. This school focuses on the labor theory of value and on what Marx considered the exploitation of labour by capital. Thus, in Marxian economics, the labour theory of value is a method for measuring the exploitation of labour in a capitalist society rather than simply a theory of price.

- David Harvey
- Eduard Bernstein
- Friedrich Engels
- Grigory Feldman
- Rosa Luxemburg
- Richard D. Wolff
- Rudolf Hilferding
- Karl Kautsky
- Karl Marx
- Nikolai Bukharin
- Nobuo Okishio
- Paul Sweezy
- Samir Amin
- Vladimir Lenin
- Yevgeni Preobrazhensky

=== Mercantilism ===
Economic policy in Europe during the late Middle Ages and early Renaissance treated economic activity as a good which was to be taxed to raise revenues for the nobility and the church. Economic exchanges were regulated by feudal rights, such as the right to collect a toll or hold a fair, as well as guild restrictions and religious restrictions on lending. Economic policy, such as it was, was designed to encourage trade through a particular area. Because of the importance of social class, sumptuary laws were enacted to regulate dress and housing, including allowable styles, materials, and the frequency of purchase for different classes. Niccolò Machiavelli in his book The Prince was one of the first authors to theorize economic policy in the form of advice. He did so by stating that princes and republics should limit their expenditures and prevent either the wealthy or the populace from despoiling the other. In this way, a state would be seen as "generous" because it was not a heavy burden on its citizens.

- Gerard de Malynes
- Edward Misselden
- Thomas Mun
- Jean Bodin
- Jean Baptiste Colbert
- Josiah Child
- William Petty
- John Locke
- Charles Davenant
- Dudley North
- Ferdinando Galiani
- James Denham-Steuart

=== Neoclassical economics ===
Neoclassical economics is often referred to by its critics as Orthodox Economics. The more specific definition this approach implies was captured by Lionel Robbins in a 1932 essay: "the science which studies human behavior as a relation between scarce means having alternative uses." The definition of scarcity is that available resources are insufficient to satisfy all wants and needs; if there is no scarcity and no alternative uses of available resources, then there is no economic problem.

- William Stanley Jevons
- Francis Ysidro Edgeworth
- Alfred Marshall
- John Bates Clark
- Irving Fisher
- Knut Wicksell

=== Neo-Marxian economics ===
- David Gordon
- Samuel Bowles
- Paul A. Baran
- Adam Przeworski
- Henryk Grossman

=== Neo-Ricardianism ===
- Piero Sraffa
- Luigi L. Pasinetti
- Vladimir Karpovich Dmitriev

=== New institutional economics ===
New institutional economics is a perspective that attempts to extend economics by focusing on the social and legal norms and rules (which are institutions) that underlie economic activity and with analysis beyond earlier institutional economics and neoclassical economics. It can be seen as a broadening step to include aspects excluded in neoclassical economics. It rediscovers aspects of classical political economy.

- Douglass North
- Oliver E. Williamson
- Ronald Coase
- Daron Acemoglu
- Steven N. S. Cheung

=== Physiocrats ===
The Physiocrats were 18th-century French economists who emphasized the importance of productive work, and particularly agriculture, to an economy's wealth. Their early support of free trade and deregulation influenced Adam Smith and the classical economists.

- Anne Robert Jacques Turgot
- François Quesnay
- Pierre le Pesant de Boisguilbert
- Richard Cantillon

=== Ricardian socialism ===
Ricardian socialism is a branch of early 19th-century classical economic thought based on the theory that labor is the source of all wealth and exchange value, and rent, profit, and interest represent distortions to a free market. The pre-Marxian theories of capitalist exploitation that they developed are widely regarded as heavily influenced by the works of David Ricardo and as favouring collective ownership of the means of production.

- John Francis Bray
- John Gray
- Charles Hall
- Thomas Hodgskin
- William Thompson

=== Scholasticism ===
- Nicole Oresme
- Thomas Aquinas
- School of Salamanca
- Leonardus Lessius

=== State socialism ===
- Henri de Saint-Simon
- Ferdinand Lassalle
- Johann Karl Rodbertus
- Fabian Society

=== Stockholm School ===
The Stockholm School is a school of economic thought. It refers to a loosely organized group of Swedish economists who worked together in Stockholm, Sweden, primarily in the 1930s.

The Stockholm School had—like John Maynard Keynes—come to the same conclusions in macroeconomics and the theories of demand and supply. Like Keynes, they were inspired by the works of Knut Wicksell, a Swedish economist active in the early years of the twentieth century.

- Gunnar Myrdal
- Bertil Ohlin

=== Utopian economics ===
- William Godwin
- Charles Fourier
- Robert Owen
- Saint-Simon
- Josiah Warren

== 20th century schools ==
In the late 20th century, areas of study that produced change in economic thinking included risk-based (rather than price-based) models, imperfect economic actors, and treating economics as a biological science (based on evolutionary norms rather than abstract exchange).

The study of risk was influential in viewing variations in price over time as more important than actual price. This applied particularly to financial economics, where risk/return tradeoffs were the crucial decisions to be made.

An important area of growth was the study of information and decision-making. Examples of this school included the work of Joseph Stiglitz. Problems of asymmetric information and moral hazard, both rooted in information economics, profoundly affect modern economic dilemmas such as executive stock options, insurance markets, and Third-World debt relief.

Finally, there was a series of economic ideas rooted in the conception of economics as a branch of biology, including the idea that energy relationships, rather than price relationships, determine economic structure. The use of fractal geometry to create economic models (see Energy Economics). In its infancy the application of non-linear dynamics to economic theory, as well as the application of evolutionary psychology explored the processes of valuation and the persistence of non-equilibrium conditions. The most visible work was in applying fractals to market analysis. Another infant branch of economics was neuroeconomics. The latter combines neuroscience, economics, and psychology to study how we make choices.

== See also ==
- Birmingham School
- Buddhist economics
- Economic ideology
- History of economic thought
- Economic thought (category B) (JEL code)
- Kameralism
- Manchester School
- Structuralist economics

== Sources ==
- Galbács, Peter (2015). The Theory of New Classical Macroeconomics. A Positive Critique. Contributions to Economics. Heidelberg/New York/Dordrecht/London: Springer. doi:10.1007/978-3-319-17578-2. ISBN 978-3-319-17578-2.
- Spiegel, Henry William. 1991. The Growth of Economic Thought. Durham & London: Duke University Press. ISBN 0-8223-0973-4
- John Eatwell, Murray Milgate, and Peter Newman, ed. (1987). The New Palgrave: A Dictionary of Economics, v. 4, Appendix IV, History of Economic Thought and Doctrine, "Schools of Thought," p. 980 (list of 23 schools)
