= Romanticism and economics =

Economic theories of the 19th century

Several economic theories of the first half of the 19th century were influenced by Romanticism, most notably those developed by Adam Müller, Friedrich List, Simonde de Sismondi, Johann Gottlieb Fichte and Thomas Carlyle. Michael Löwy and Robert Sayre first formulated their thesis about Romanticism as an anti-capitalist and anti-modernist worldview in a 1984 article called "Figures of Romantic Anti-capitalism". Romantic anti-capitalism was a wide spectrum of opposition to capitalism, ultimately tracing its roots back to the Romantic movement of the early 19th century, but acquiring a new impetus in the latter part of the 19th century.

Vladimir Lenin had written already in 1897 that "the wishes of the romanticists are very good (as are those of the Narodniks). Their recognition of the contradictions of capitalism places them above the blind optimists who deny the existence of these contradictions."

Karl Marx in 1868 also considered Romanticism to have been the first historical trend of opposition to capitalism, to be followed by the trend of socialism: "The first reaction against the French Revolution and the period of Enlightenment bound up with it was naturally to see everything as mediaeval and Romantic, even people like Grimm are not free from this. The second reaction is to look beyond the Middle Ages into the primitive age of each nation, and that corresponds to the socialist tendency, although these learned men have no idea that the two have any connection."

Considering Romanticism as a reflection of the age beginning after the French Revolution and its inherent social contradictions, Marx and Engels distinguished between "revolutionary Romanticism", which rejected capitalism and was striving towards the future, and Romantic criticism of capitalism from the point of view of the past. They also differentiated between the Romantic writers who idealized the feudal social system: they valued those whose works concealed democratic and critical elements under a veneer of reactionary utopias, and criticized the "reactionary Romantics", whose sympathies for the past amounted to a defense of the interests of the nobility. Marx and Engels were especially fond of the works of such revolutionary romantics as Byron and Shelley.

== Johann Gottlieb Fichte ==
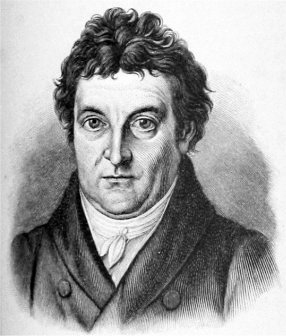
Johann Gottlieb Fichte

German idealist philosopher Johann Gottlieb Fichte's 1800 economic treatise The Closed Commercial State had a profound influence on the economic theories of German Romanticism. In it, Fichte argues the need for the strictest, purely guild-like regulation of industry.

The "exemplary rational state" (Vernunftstaat), Fichte argues, should not allow any of its "subjects" to engage in this or that production, failing to pass the preliminary test, not certifying government agents in their professional skills and agility. According to Vladimir Mikhailovich Shulyatikov, "this kind of demand was typical of Mittelstand, the German petty middle class, the class of artisans, hoping by creating artificial barriers to stop the victorious march of big capital and thus save themselves from inevitable death. The same demand was imposed on the state, as is evident from Fichte's treatise, by the German "factory" (Fabrik), more precisely, the manufacture of the early 19th century".

Fichte opposed free trade and unrestrained capitalist industrial growth, stating: "There is an endless war of all against all ... And this war is becoming more fierce, unjust, more dangerous in its consequences, the more the world's population grows, the more acquisitions the trading state makes, the more production and art (industry) develops and, together with thus, the number of circulating goods increases, and with them the needs become more and more diversified. What, with the simple way of life of nations, was done before without great injustices and oppression, turns, thanks to increased needs, into flagrant injustice, into a source of great evils. The buyer tries to take the goods away from the seller; therefore he demands freedom of trade, i.e. freedom for the seller to wander around the markets, freedom not to find a sale for goods and sell them significantly below their value. Therefore, he requires strong competition between manufacturers (Fabrikanten) and merchants."

The only means that could save the modern world, which would destroy evil at the root, is, according to Fichte, to split the "world state" (the global market) into separate self-sufficient bodies. Each such body, each "closed trading state" will be able to regulate its internal economic relations. It will be able to both extract and process everything that is needed to meet the needs of its citizens. It will carry out the ideal organization of production. Fichte argued for government regulation of industrial growth, writing "Only by limitation does a certain industry become the property of the class that deals with it".

Vladimir Mikhailovich Shulyatikov considers the economics of German idealists and Romantics as representing the compromise of the German bourgeoisie of the early 19th century with the monarchical State:

The French physiocrats proclaimed the principle: "Laissez faire!" On the other hand, the German capitalists of the 1800s, whose ideologists were the objective idealists, professed a belief in the saving effect of government tutelage.

== Adam Müller ==
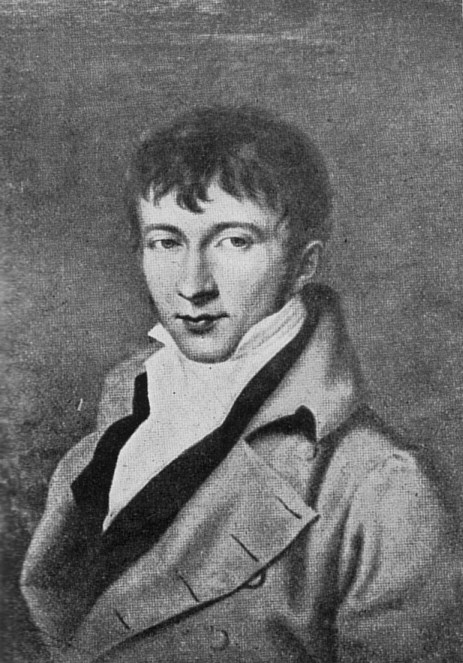
Adam Müller

Adam Müller was the first intellectual from within the ranks of the German Romantic movement to publish comprehensive studies on economics and the state, influenced by Fichte. Müller was a conservative writer whose vision of the state was one of an absolute power, in contrast to theorists who emphasized the rights of man such as Montesquieu and Rousseau.

His position in political economy is defined by his strong opposition to Adam Smith's system of materialistic-liberal (so-called classical) political economy, or the so-called industry system. He censures Smith as presenting a one-sidedly material and individualistic conception of society, and as being too exclusively English in his views. Müller is thus also an adversary of free trade. In contrast with the economical individualism of Adam Smith, he emphasizes the ethical element in national economy, the duty of the state toward the individual, and the religious basis which is also necessary in this field. Müller's importance in the history of political economy is acknowledged even by the opponents of his religious and political point of view. His reaction against Adam Smith, says Roscher (Geschichte der National-Ökonomik, p. 763), "is not blind or hostile, but is important, and often truly helpful." Some of his ideas, freed from much of their alloy, are reproduced in the writings of the historical school of German economists.

The reactionary and feudalistic thought in Müller's writings, which agreed so little with the spirit of the times, prevented his political ideas from exerting a more notable and lasting influence on his age, while their religious character prevented them from being justly appreciated. However, Müller's teachings had long-term effects in that they were taken up again by 20th century theorists of corporatism and the corporate state, for example Othmar Spann (Der wahre Staat. Vorlesungen über Abbruch und Neubau der Gesellschaft, Vienna, 1921).

== Simonde de Sismondi ==
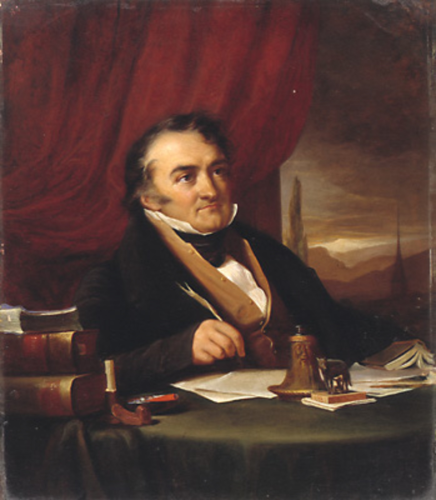
Simonde de Sismondi

The first critic of laissez-faire capitalism from a standpoint not decidedly feudal, was the Swiss economist Simonde de Sismondi, whose theories are known as "economic Romanticism". As an economist, Sismondi represented a humanitarian protest against the dominant orthodoxy of his time. In his principal work, Nouveaux principes d'économie politique (1819), he insisted on the fact that economic science studied the means of increasing wealth too much, and the use of wealth for producing happiness, too little. Sismondi contrasted the peaceful, simple trade in goods and an age of crisis and mass unemployment. He wrote, "Let us beware of this dangerous theory of equilibrium which is supposed to be automatically established. A certain kind of equilibrium, it is true, is reestablished in the long run, but it is after a frightful amount of suffering." While he was not a socialist, in protesting against laissez faire and invoking the state "to regulate the progress of wealth" he was an interesting precursor of the German Historical school of economics, on whose theories the European welfare states of social benefits were based.

Vladimir Lenin stated that "the reactionary point of view of the Romantic Sismondi lies not at all in the fact that he wanted to return to the Middle Ages, but in the fact that he compared the present with the past, and not with the future, that he proved the eternal needs of society through ruins and not through the tendencies of recent development".

== Thomas Carlyle ==
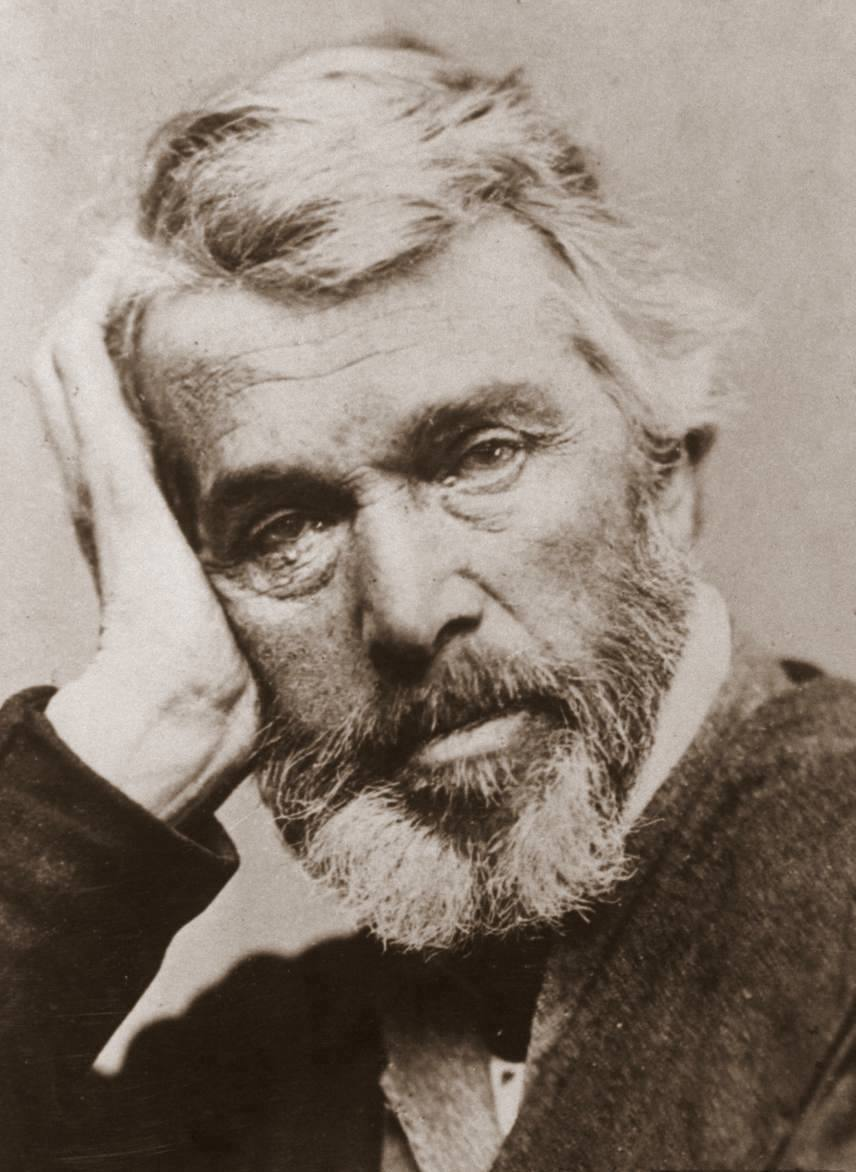
Thomas Carlyle

British philosopher and mathematician Thomas Carlyle, a promoter of German Romantic literature in Britain, was before 1848 a leading representative of the Romantic economic criticism of capitalism, characterized by György Lukács as "one of the most astute and insightful critics of the emerging capitalist relations of production, highlighting its destructive influence over old forms of social organization in his writings on the French Revolution ... [Carlyle] in his works prior to 1848, waged an untiring campaign of exposure against the prevalent capitalism, against those who praised it for its unproblematic progressiveness, and against the mendacious theory that this progress served the interest of the working people." Carlyle contrasted the ordered and purposeful artisan labour in the Middle Ages with the division of labour and an age of anarchy in modern capitalism, and found the Middle Ages to be better.

Carlyle's attacks on the ills of industrialisation and on classical economics were an important inspiration for U.S. progressives. In particular, Carlyle criticised John Stuart Mill's economic ideas for supporting Black Emancipation by arguing that Blacks' socio-economic status depended on economic opportunities rather than heredity. Carlyle's racist justification for economic statism evolved into the elitist and eugenicist "intelligent social engineering" promoted early on by the progressive American Economic Association.

== Others ==
French author Honoré de Balzac, although a realist in his writing style and a monarchist in his political convictions, he described everyday life in the period of France's transition from feudalism to capitalism from a position close to that of the Romantic economists. In novels like "La Comédie humaine" and especially "Illusions perdues" depicts with harrowing realism the tumultuous transition of France from feudalism to capitalism and the sorrows these bring to many peoples and classes of people, together with the joys they bring to others. In sympathy with the victims of capitalism, Balzac presents the executors of the judgment, the finance people who present the bill, as monsters. Insofar as the industrialists appear at all, they are categorized as productive labor in Saint-Simonian fashion. The parasites and bloodsuckers are only the bankers and usurers, not the industrialists.

In a passage of the Grundrisse, Karl Marx makes the following remark on the Romantic perspective: "It is as ridiculous to yearn for a return to that original fullness as it is to believe that with this complete emptiness history has come to a standstill. The bourgeois viewpoint has never advanced beyond this antithesis between itself and this romantic viewpoint, and therefore the latter will accompany it as legitimate antithesis up to its blessed end."

Vladimir Lenin considered the economic theories of the Russian populists (Narodniks) of the second half of the 19th century to be a representation of economic Romanticism, writing: "The economic doctrine of the Narodniks is only a Russian variety of general European Romanticism".
