= Historical school of economics =

Approach to academic economics

The German historical school of economics was an approach to academic economics and to public administration that emerged in the 19th century in Germany, and held sway there until well into the 20th century. The professors involved compiled massive economic histories of Germany and Europe. Numerous Americans were their students. The school was opposed by theoretical economists. Prominent leaders included Gustav von Schmoller (1838–1917), and Max Weber (1864–1920) in Germany, and Joseph Schumpeter (1883–1950) in Austria and the United States.

== Tenets ==
The historical school held that history was the key source of knowledge about human actions and economic matters, since economics was culture-specific, and hence not generalizable over space and time. The Historical School of Economics, in addition to rejecting the universal validity of economic theorems and emphasizing an empirical and historical approach, drew significant methodological influence from the historism of Leopold von Ranke. Although von Ranke was not an economist, his insistence on rigorous, source-based analysis to understand societal development profoundly shaped the school's approach. Wilhelm Roscher, a leading figure of the Older Historical School, studied under von Ranke and incorporated his focus on historical and cultural specificity into the analysis of economic phenomena. This legacy reinforced the school's view that economics could not be abstracted from its historical and cultural context, further distancing it from universal theories and mathematical models.The school rejected the universal validity of economic theorems. They saw economics as resulting from careful empirical and historical analysis instead of from logic and mathematics. The school also rejected mathematical modelling.

Most members of the school were also Sozialpolitiker (social policy advocates), i.e. concerned with social reform and improved conditions for the common man during a period of heavy industrialization. They were more disparagingly referred to as Kathedersozialisten, rendered in English as "socialists of the chair" (compare armchair revolutionary), due to their positions as professors.

The historical school can be divided into three tendencies:

- the Older, led by Wilhelm Roscher, Karl Knies, and Bruno Hildebrand;
- the Younger, led by Gustav von Schmoller, and also including Étienne Laspeyres, Karl Bücher, Adolph Wagner, Georg Friedrich Knapp and to some extent Lujo Brentano;
- the Youngest, led by Werner Sombart and including, to a very large extent, Max Weber.

Predecessors included Friedrich List and Adam Müller, (although Müller and List are considered part of the romantic tradition of economics).

The historical school largely controlled appointments to chairs of economics in German universities under the state-sponsored cartel of Gustav Schmoller, and was involved in the Methodenstreit ("strife over method") with the Austrian school.

== Influence in Britain and the United States ==
The historical school had a significant impact on Britain, 1860s–1930s. Thorold Rogers (1823–1890) was the Tooke Professor of Statistics and Economic Science at King's College London, from 1859 until his death. He is best known for compiling the monumental A History of Agriculture and Prices in England from 1259 to 1793 (7 vol. 1866–1902), which is still useful to scholars. William Ashley (1860–1927) introduced British scholars to the historical school as developed in Germany. In the United States the school influenced the institutional economists, such as Thorstein Veblen (1857–1929) and especially the Wisconsin school of labor history led by John R. Commons (1862–1945). More importantly, numerous aspiring economists undertook graduate studies at German universities, including John Bates Clark, Richard T. Ely, Jeremiah Jenks, Simon Patten, and Frank William Taussig.

A significant motivation of the spread of the thought of the Historical School to the United States was the moral scepticism of classical economics by the Progressive Movement during the late 19th and early 20th centuries, and Progressive economists such as E. J. James discussed social reform as economically necessary on the basis of the research of the Historical School which took the purpose of economics towards allowing humanity to fulfil moral ideas of life.

According to McClellan, the United States had 'perhaps the strongest connections' with the Verein fur Sozialpolitik (the formal association associated with the Historical School), and 20 of the American Economic Association's first 26 presidents studied in Germany.

Canadian scholars influenced by the school were led by Harold Innis (1894–1952) at Toronto. His staples thesis holds that Canada's culture, political history and economy have been decisively influenced by the exploitation and export of a series of "staples" such as fur, fishing, lumber, wheat, mined metals and coal. The staple thesis dominated economic history in Canada 1930s–1960s, and is still used by some.

After 1930 the historical school declined or disappeared in most economics departments. It lingered in history departments and business schools. The major influence in the 1930s and 1940s was Joseph Schumpeter with his dynamic, change-oriented, and innovation-based economics. Although his writings could be critical of the school, Schumpeter's work on the role of innovation and entrepreneurship can be seen as a continuation of ideas originated by the historical school, especially the work of von Schmoller and Sombart. Alfred D. Chandler Jr. (1918–2007) had a major impact on approaching business issues through historical studies.

== Members of the school ==
- Karl Bücher
- Bruno Hildebrand
- Georg Friedrich Knapp
- Karl Knies
- Étienne Laspeyres
- Wilhelm Roscher
- Gustav von Schmoller
- Werner Sombart
- Adolph Wagner
- Max Weber
- Karl Polanyi
- Joseph Schumpeter

== English school ==
There was also an English historical school, whose figures included Francis Bacon and Herbert Spencer. This school heavily critiqued the deductive approach of the classical economists, especially the writings of David Ricardo. This school revered the inductive process and called for the merging of historical fact with those of the present period. Included in this school are: William Whewell, Richard Jones, Walter Bagehot, Thorold Rogers, Arnold Toynbee, and William Cunningham, to name a few.

== See also ==
- Freiburg school
- Historism
- Institutional economics, a related school developed in the United States
- German Historical School of Law
- Productivity improving technologies (historical)
