= Political romanticism =

Political thought of the Romantic movement

Political romanticism (German: politische Romantik) is, in a broad sense, the political thought of the Romantics from the late eighteenth century through the first half of the nineteenth. In a narrower, polemical sense, the term refers to an aesthetic approach to politics that critics attributed chiefly to the German Romantics. In their view, this approach led to indifference to practical questions and an inability to make political decisions.

Although the German Romantics' politics changed markedly after 1800, certain themes recur in their writings. They held that feeling and imagination could reveal aspects of moral and religious experience beyond the reach of the abstract reasoning they attributed to the Enlightenment. They rejected the idea of the autonomous, purely rational individual and argued that individuality could develop only within a community. This led them to question the premise of liberal social contract theory that self-interested individuals could found society and the state by agreement, and to seek a community held together by love, a shared culture and religion. Like Herder and Burke, they believed that institutions must grow gradually out of a people's history, and saw the state as a living organism rather than a machine built to a plan and run from above.

Most early Romantics, including Friedrich Schlegel and Novalis, welcomed the French Revolution and remained republicans, but favoured gradual reform and educating the public through art over revolutionary action. They opposed enlightened absolutism for stifling freedom and popular participation, and early liberalism for weakening the bonds of community. After 1800, the movement turned towards conservatism and nationalism: Schlegel, Adam Müller and others came to defend monarchy, aristocracy and the Church, and Müller idealised the feudal order in his organic theory of the state. Under Napoleonic rule, Heidelberg Romantics such as Achim von Arnim and Clemens Brentano saw the poetry and songs of the Volk as the basis of national identity; by collecting and reworking them, they redefined the people, sovereign in revolutionary thought, as the creator of a shared poetic tradition. Outside Germany, Romantic political thought ranged from the conservatism of Coleridge and Wordsworth to the radicalism of Byron and Shelley and the democratic Romanticism of Lamennais and Mazzini.

Hegel objected that Romantic irony allowed individuals to treat every commitment as revocable. Liberals and democrats such as Heinrich Heine and Arnold Ruge saw Romanticism as an ally of the Restoration. In Political Romanticism (1919), Carl Schmitt defined political romanticism as "subjectified occasionalism": an aesthetic attitude that treats the world as a mere occasion for the individual's imagination. For Schmitt, this attitude precludes political decision and so has no necessary link to conservatism or any other political position. His influential account has been read as a polemic against liberalism and questioned in light of his later collaboration with National Socialism. Some National Socialists claimed the Romantics as precursors, and critics such as Arthur O. Lovejoy, György Lukács and Thomas Mann traced Nazism back to Romanticism. Later scholars have objected to reading Romantic politics as a whole in the light of Nazism.

== The political thought of the German Romantics ==
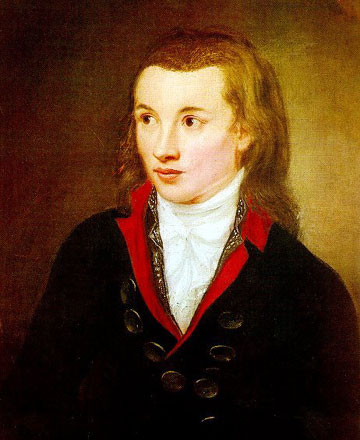
Novalis, portrait by Franz Gareis, c. 1799

German Romanticism began in the late 1790s as a literary movement centred on Jena and Berlin. Its early circle included the brothers August Wilhelm and Friedrich Schlegel, Schleiermacher, Schelling and Novalis. At first, their interests were chiefly aesthetic: they championed the autonomy of art, arguing that art was an end in itself, independent of moral, religious and political aims. For this reason, they have often been accused of political indifference. Yet for them an autonomous art was itself a symbol of freedom, and in their work aesthetics and politics were inseparable. The political importance they gave to art reflected their response to two developments of the 1790s: the French Revolution and what they saw as a crisis of the Enlightenment. Indeed, Romanticism as a whole was closely bound up, in both its aims and its art, with the age of revolutions (c. 1770–1850) in which it developed across Europe.

Historians usually distinguish early Romanticism (Frühromantik, 1797–1802) from the high and late Romanticism of the following decades (1803–1830). Most early Romantics were republicans who welcomed the French Revolution; after 1800 Friedrich Schlegel, Adam Müller and others came to defend monarchy, aristocracy and the Church. Frederick C. Beiser warns against reading the conservatism of the later movement back into early Romantic politics, while acknowledging continuities between the phases. Throughout, Romantic political thought was shaped by a tension between the ideal of the free, creative individual inherited from Kant and Fichte and the aspiration to recover a social and spiritual unity that, the Romantics felt, modernity had eroded. They held that feeling and imagination could reveal dimensions of moral and religious experience inaccessible to abstract reason alone. They also rejected what they saw as the Enlightenment conception of the individual as purely rational and self-sufficient: in their view, people could develop their individuality only through their relations with others, within a community that preceded them. They questioned the assumption, central to liberal social contract theory, that individuals pursuing their own interests could establish society and the state by agreement.

The Romantics also opposed the political thought of enlightened absolutism. Theorists such as Christian Wolff and August Ludwig von Schlözer had compared the state to an artificial machine built to promote the public good; the early Romantics described their ideal society instead as an organism that grows out of a people's history, and later writers such as Adam Müller applied the analogy to the state itself. They challenged natural law and social contract theories as well as the centralised administration of absolutist states, and saw families, estates, guilds, corporations, municipalities and churches as communities through which individuals took part in public life. Early Romantics valued these bodies as means of self-government and popular representation, while later Romantics valued them as parts of a hierarchical order. Community, in their view, should rest on love, religion and a shared culture rather than on self-interest or coercion. For this reason many of them opposed capitalist economic relations, which they believed eroded traditional ties of family and estate.

These ideas drew on several eighteenth-century forerunners. Jean-Jacques Rousseau, widely regarded as a progenitor of Romanticism, held that human beings, good by nature, had been corrupted by modern civilisation; his later writings on nature, imagination, feeling and authenticity influenced [Johann Gottfried Herder|Herder]], Novalis and Friedrich Schlegel and supplied themes for the Romantic critique of the Enlightenment. Herder, generally regarded as a founder of modern nationalism and historicism, anticipated the Romantics' communitarianism and their view of states and cultures as unique products of history; for him, a people was held together by a shared language, history and religion, not by the mechanical unity of a centralised state. Edmund Burke's Reflections on the Revolution in France, translated into German three times by 1793, influenced both Schlegel and Novalis. Novalis called it "a revolutionary book against the Revolution" and agreed with Burke that laws should grow out of a people's history. The Romantics took from Schiller the belief that art, more than reason, should educate the public for a republic; from Fichte they took the conviction that intellectuals should guide the progress of humanity, though they criticised his philosophy as one-sidedly intellectual and moralistic, and dismissive of nature.

=== Early Romanticism (1797–1802) ===
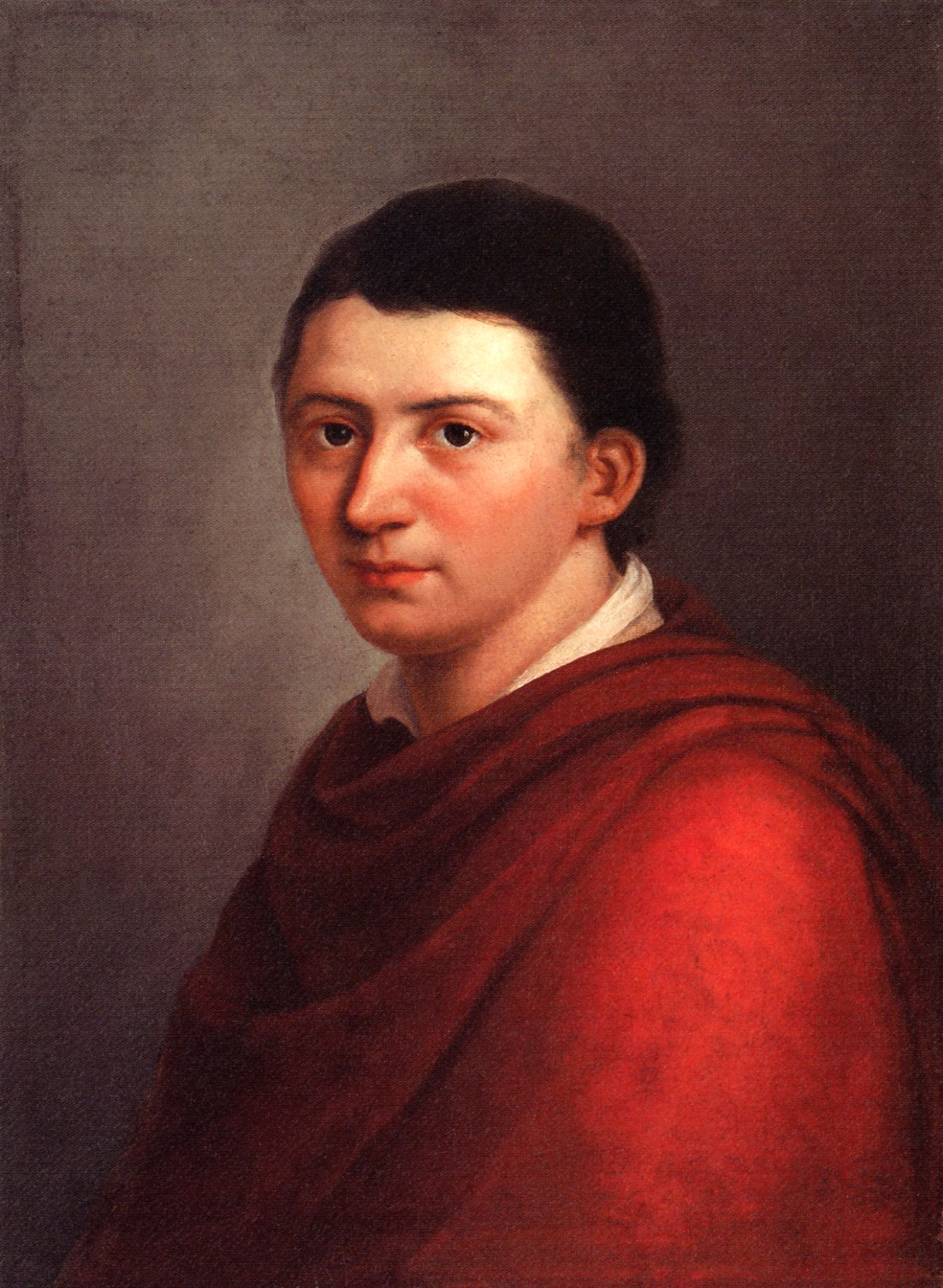
Friedrich Schlegel, portrait by Franz Gareis, 1801

The early German Romantics sought a middle course between liberalism and conservatism. They valued both community and individual liberty and believed that genuine community was possible only in a republic whose citizens took part in government. Most welcomed the French Revolution and, unlike many German intellectuals, remained sympathetic through the September Massacres, the invasion of the Rhineland, the execution of the king and even the Terror. Around 1797–1798, however, Friedrich Schlegel, Novalis and Schleiermacher grew more critical of the egoism and materialism they saw in revolutionary France and began to favour a republic that combined democracy with elements of aristocracy and monarchy. They remained republicans but thought the German people were unready for a republic. They favoured gradual change through reform from above and the education (Bildung) of the public. They put art at the centre of this education: reason could establish the principles of liberty, equality and fraternity, but only art could move people to act on them.

Art was also their answer to what they saw as the crisis of the Enlightenment. They valued rational criticism but believed it had left people without faith, community or a sense of unity with nature. By engaging the imagination, art would restore these ties while preserving the freedom gained through criticism. Novalis took Schiller's programme further, proposing to turn political life itself into a work of art. He imagined a "poetic state" shaped by the ideal of beauty. Its monarch, "the poet of poets", would preside over public life as over a great theatre in which every citizen had a part. Art would surround the monarch with grandeur and mystery, allowing him to embody the nation's shared values and traditions.

Novalis saw republicanism as compatible with monarchy. In his words, "the true king becomes a republic, the true republic becomes a king". For Schlegel, the highest beauty was the love that united free and equal citizens in a republic. At his most radical, he argued that a true republic had to be democratic and that monarchy could coexist with a republican culture only while it was taking shape or already in decline. Schleiermacher rejected eighteenth-century absolute monarchy and favoured a pluralistic, decentralised state whose monarch would express the collective consciousness. He held that the state had no authority over higher culture and could encourage its citizens' activities without directing them. These ideas have been seen as close to liberalism.

The early Romantics traced the loss of community to the modern economy and bourgeois individualism. They criticised the division of labour, the utilitarian ethic of the philistine (Philister), the egoism of market competition and the social contract theorists' assumption that self-interest could found a society. They saw the need to love and be loved, rather than self-interest, as the basis of social life. They opposed enlightened absolutism, exemplified by Frederick the Great's "machine state", for suppressing individual freedom and popular participation, and early liberalism for weakening ties to the community. In their view, both had swept away the guilds, councils and corporations that stood between government and individual. They envisaged a community, held together by love and a common culture, that would develop gradually, without a rational blueprint.

From 1799, religion took over from art as the main means of Bildung. Schleiermacher's On Religion, Schlegel's Ideas and Novalis's Christianity or Europe called for a new religion or mythology. Art now served religion, which took on art's former task of bringing the ideals of the Revolution home to the public.

=== The turn to conservatism ===
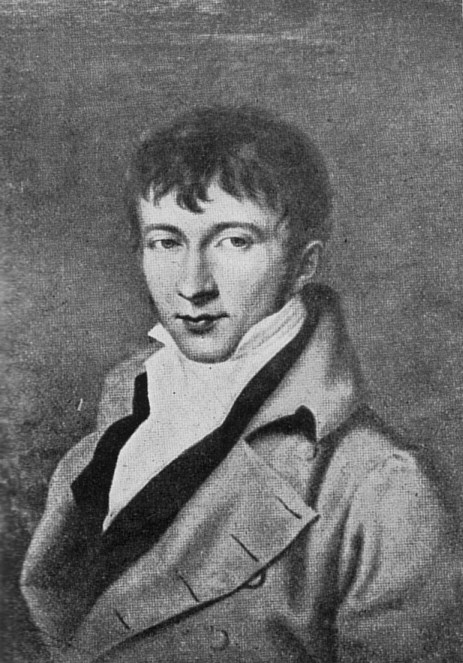
Adam Müller, portrait by Gerhard von Kügelgen, 1807

After 1800, many German Romantics, like several of their English contemporaries, moved towards conservatism. Beiser links the shift to fears that the Revolution and the spread of capitalism would undermine community: no longer trusting the people to build a community on their own, they looked increasingly to state authority and medieval corporate institutions, until Romanticism "ultimately became the most powerful current within conservatism". Claudio Cesa also points to German disappointment with the Revolution's outcome and with the power politics of the French Republic and Empire in their dealings with Germany. A revolution that had claimed universal significance now seemed to serve a single nation.

Friedrich Schlegel still called himself a republican in his Cologne lectures of 1804–1805, but he rejected the liberal view that the state's role was limited to protecting rights. He assigned it responsibility for religion, the distribution of property and the cultivation of its citizens' humanity. The lectures also defended a society organised into estates and corporations. Like Adam Müller, Schlegel saw the medieval estates as parts of an integrated political order. The estates were to advise the monarch on matters affecting them, while the crown retained political and judicial authority. Schlegel rejected English-style representation as mechanical and incompatible with monarchy. After converting to Catholicism, he joined Müller and Franz von Baader in invoking religion to defend monarchy, aristocracy and the Church.

Adam Müller's Elemente der Staatskunst (1808–1809) gave the organic theory of the state a more systematic and explicitly conservative form. Müller, a Catholic convert and admirer of Burke, saw an idealised medieval feudal state as a model for averting revolution. For Müller, the state was the "totality of life" and a partnership between the living, their ancestors and their successors. Freedom depended on a social order in which each person had a distinct role, while hereditary nobility and feudal property would preserve the state across generations. Müller argued that capitalism undermined community: the division of labour, he wrote, turned workers into "dead cog wheels" and caused a "metaphysical chilling of the soul". He looked to guild-like ties and the paternal authority of the nobility as remedies.

Under Napoleonic domination, national identity became central to Romantic political thought. In Heidelberg, Achim von Arnim, Clemens Brentano and Joseph Görres collected oral traditions. Des Knaben Wunderhorn (1806–1808) and Görres's survey of German chapbooks (1807) preserved and creatively reworked this material. By locating national identity in the poetry of the people (Volk), these projects recast the political idea of the people inherited from the Revolution in cultural terms. Friedrich Carl von Savigny applied this view to law. In Vom Beruf unsrer Zeit für Gesetzgebung und Rechtswissenschaft (1814), he opposed Anton Thibaut's proposal for a common code for the German states and argued that popular belief and custom were the only legitimate sources of law. Görres, a Rhineland Jacobin in his youth and later a leading opponent of Napoleon, adopted the organic theory in his pamphlet Germany and the Revolution. He called for German unity and corporate constitutions that would give the people a share in public affairs. The pamphlet was confiscated, and Görres went into exile and turned to the history of mysticism and the Catholic Church.

The search for a national community also had an exclusionary side. Roya Kehl and Frederike Middelhoff argue that stereotyping of Jews and of Sinti and Roma was central to Romantic efforts to define and mobilise a community, especially in nationalist contexts. They discuss the German Table Society as an example.

== Beyond Germany ==
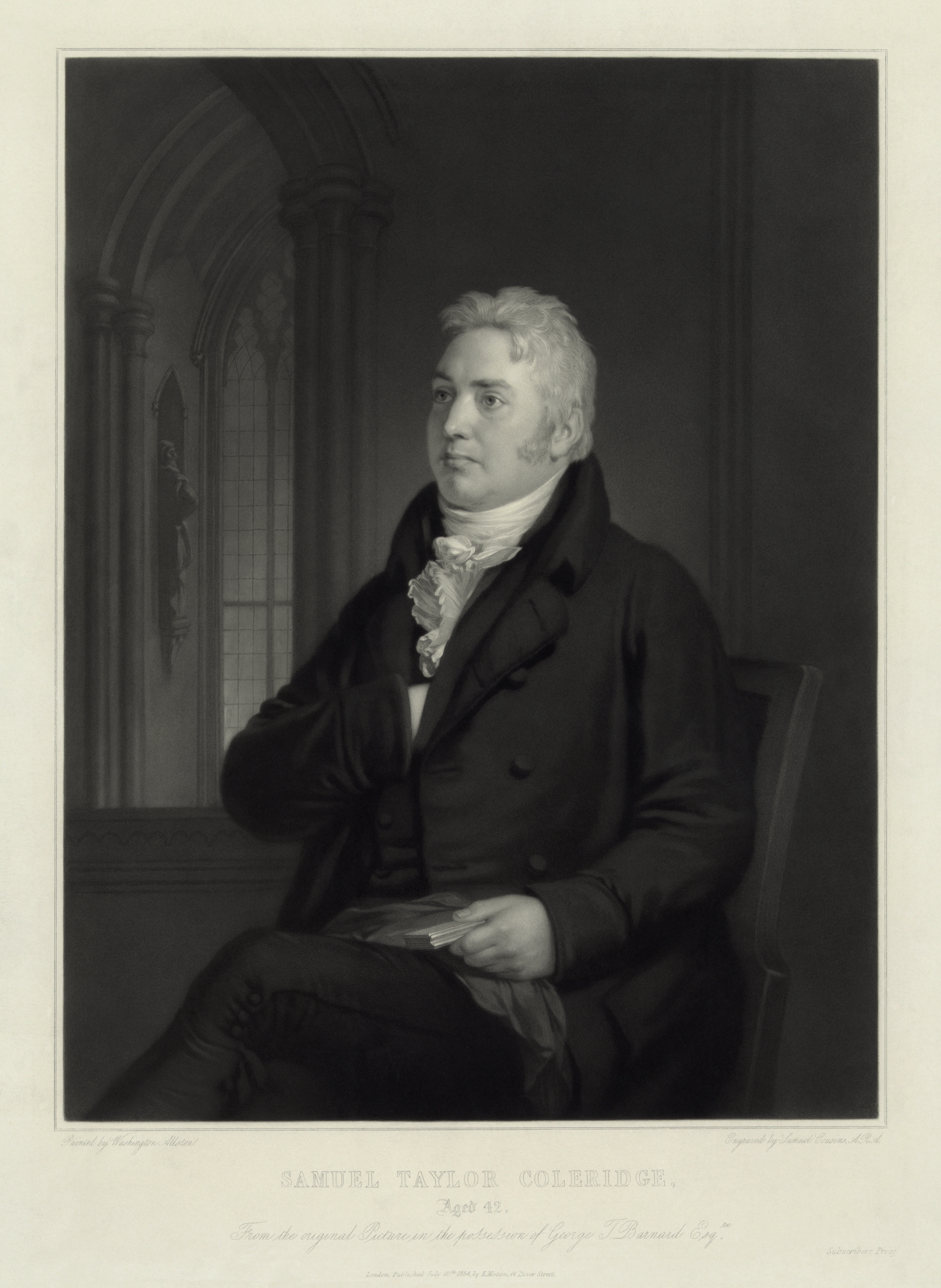
Samuel Taylor Coleridge, after a portrait by Washington Allston, 1814

Romantic political thought was not confined to Germany, and its implications varied with generation and national context. John Morrow distinguishes three strands. In England as in Germany, several Romantics who had welcomed the Revolution and supported radical reform developed conservative and nationalist views during the struggle against Napoleon. Unlike the German Romantics, who had to devise an alternative to the mechanistic monarchy of eighteenth-century absolutism, Coleridge, Southey and Wordsworth could largely take the British constitution and its representative tradition for granted and were far less critical of inherited institutions. Coleridge even sought to give the estates a place in representative government, an idea the German Romantics rejected.

After 1815, younger Romantics such as Byron, Hazlitt and Shelley saw the older writers' conservatism as a betrayal of their earlier radicalism. They attacked the church and state these writers now defended. Hazlitt accused Southey, the Poet Laureate, of putting literature at the service of repression. The younger writers' positions ranged from Byron's classical republicanism through Hazlitt's representative democracy to Shelley's philosophical anarchism.

A third, progressive strand emerged between 1815 and 1850. Chateaubriand, Lamennais and Lamartine in France and Thomas Carlyle in Britain accepted the Revolution as an accomplished fact without seeking to revive the traditional order. Their concerns extended beyond political oppression to the social problems created by industrial change. Lamennais and Lamartine moved towards democracy and socialism. Carlyle, despite his authoritarianism, influenced the revival of British socialism at the end of the century.

In Italy, Giuseppe Mazzini shared the Romantics' distrust of the state and of mere "politics", preferring to speak of "association", a term that for him meant both society and community. He saw the people as the main actors in history, countered the theory of rights with an emphasis on duties, and condemned both laissez-faire economics and socialist programmes for their failure in practice. Cesa considers him the most typical representative of European democratic Romanticism.

== Critique ==
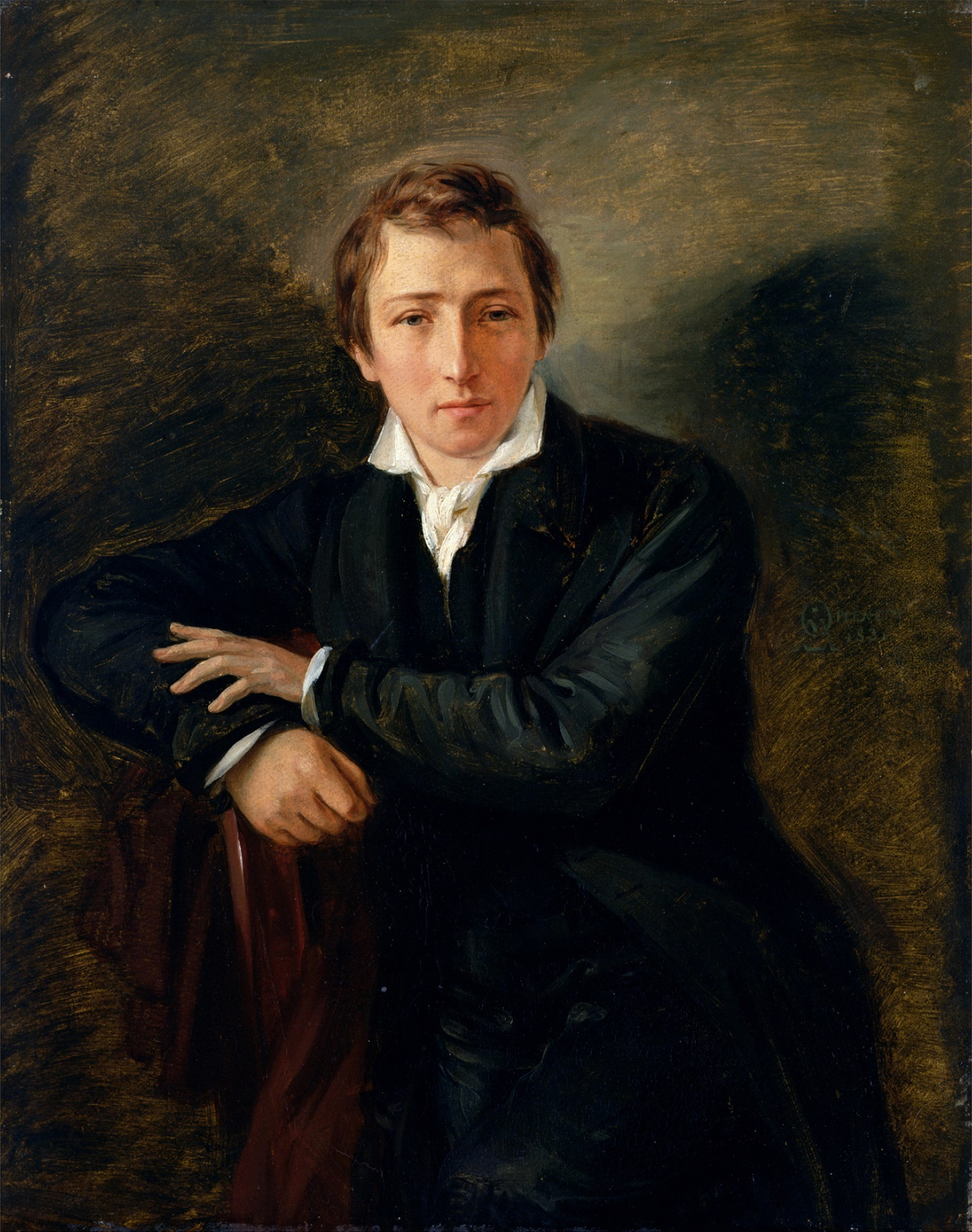
Heinrich Heine, portrait by Moritz Daniel Oppenheim, 1831

"Political romanticism" has often been a term of reproach. Critics used it to condemn Romanticism as incompatible with practical politics. In political disputes, calling a proposal "romantic" was a way to dismiss it as unworkable. In Germany, political romanticism became synonymous with reaction and the Restoration. In France, Romanticism was more often seen as a revolutionary principle derived from Rousseau. Friedrich Meinecke used the expression as a chapter title in Weltbürgertum und Nationalstaat (1908). He criticised Novalis, Schlegel and Müller for a universalism that, in his view, kept them from accepting the modern state.

=== Nineteenth-century critics ===
Hegel read Friedrich Schlegel's Romantic irony as a claim that nothing has value independently of the individual's will and that any commitment can therefore be set aside. In the Philosophy of Right, he treated this attitude as a form of moral evil. For Hegel, the ironist's freedom amounted to a mere capacity for arbitrary choice (Willkür), whereas his theory of ethical life grounded freedom in an objective system of duties.

After 1815, German liberals and democrats saw Romanticism as an ally of the restored regimes and their religious and aristocratic supporters. Heinrich Heine was himself shaped by Romantic poetry but turned against the movement over its political implications. In Die romantische Schule (1835), he portrayed Romanticism as a defence of the Middle Ages and argued that its reverence for the people, the nation and the Catholic past concealed hostility to equality and political freedom.

The Hegelian democrat Arnold Ruge likewise argued that Romanticism's apparent detachment from politics masked its support for reactionary government. He contrasted what he saw as its subjective caprice with the rational freedom of the age.

=== Carl Schmitt ===
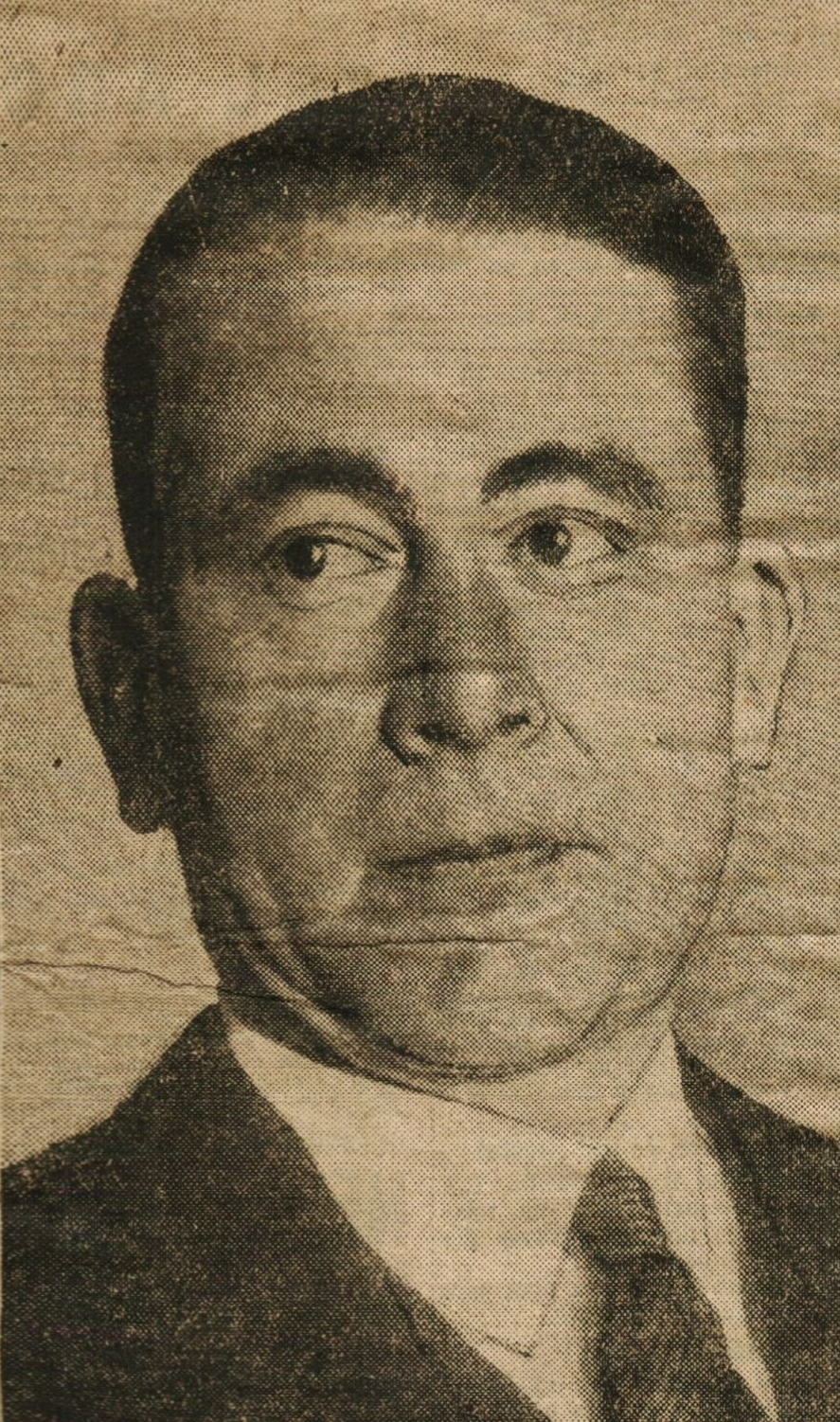
Carl Schmitt in 1929

The jurist Carl Schmitt's Politische Romantik (1919, enlarged second edition 1925) shaped the use of the term. Schmitt argued that, since the Romantics had glorified kings and revolutionaries alike, political romanticism could be defined only by the Romantic individual's attitude to the world. He called this attitude "subjectified occasionalism". For Malebranche, worldly events merely provide occasions for God to act. In Schmitt's account, the Romantic individual takes God's place and treats the world as a mere occasion for aesthetic creation. Schmitt objected not to any irrationalist content but to this ironic and relativising aesthetic. He traced the attitude to bourgeois society, which isolates individuals and leaves them to supply for themselves the authority once provided by a social hierarchy.

For Schmitt, political romanticism was an emotional accompaniment to political events, with no doctrine of its own. Unable to decide between right and wrong, the Romantic evades each choice by taking refuge in a "higher third" and remains passive. The German Romantics therefore romanticised first the Revolution and then the Restoration, ending up in the service of whichever power prevailed. His main German examples were Adam Müller and Friedrich Schlegel. Schmitt accordingly denied any necessary link between Romanticism and conservatism. Counter-revolutionaries such as Burke, de Maistre and Bonald were not political Romantics, since their opposition to the Revolution rested on the judgement that it was wrong. As Schmitt put it, "where political activity begins, political romanticism ends". He distinguished political romanticism from "romantic politics", in which someone capable of making a decision acts on a romanticised idea. His examples included Don Quixote and Karl Ludwig Sand, who murdered Kotzebue in 1819.

Commentators have read the book as a polemic against liberalism. On this reading, Schmitt's sympathies lay with the counter-revolutionaries and political Catholicism, and he sought to detach conservatism from Romanticism. His main target was the liberal bourgeois order, which protected the private sphere that made Romantic inwardness possible. Critics have questioned Schmitt's account both for its sweeping claims about Romanticism and in light of his later collaboration with the Nazi regime.

== Romanticism and National Socialism ==
From the First World War onwards, an influential view of Romanticism as a German protest against the Enlightenment was taken up in the anti-democratic milieu of the Conservative Revolution and National Socialism. This interpretation owed much to Wilhelm Dilthey. Some National Socialists claimed the Romantics as their precursors. In 1933, the Nazi literary scholar Walther Linden presented the Romantic ideal of community as a model for National Socialism. He located true Romanticism in the movement's later, religious phase and saw the young Friedrich Schlegel's individualism as unrepresentative.

Some liberal and Marxist critics accepted this genealogy and used it to criticise Romanticism. In 1936, the legal scholar Reinhold Aris, who had left Germany for Britain after the Nazis took power, argued that if modern fascism had "any theoretical foundation at all", it lay in Romanticism. In 1941, Arthur O. Lovejoy traced Nazi ideology to the Romantic ideas of the organic state, the will's endless striving and the absolute worth of national distinctiveness. György Lukács associated Romanticism with irrationalism and "proto-fascistic tendencies". In his 1945 lecture "Germany and the Germans", Thomas Mann portrayed the Germans as the people of a "romantic counter-revolution" against the European Enlightenment. He helped popularise the view that Romanticism, especially in its high and late phases, had prepared the ground for Nazi ideology through its commitment to irrationalism.

The historian Jacques Barzun challenged this reading, arguing that Romanticism defended individual differences against enforced conformity. Research on early Romanticism, including critical editions of Schlegel and Novalis, expanded from the 1960s, spurred in part by the post-war debate over Romanticism and totalitarianism. By emphasising the early Romantics' republican commitments, scholars offered an alternative to readings that centred on the later movement's Catholic conservatism. Beiser argues that the early Romantics wanted a community that would foster each person's independence and allow them to develop in their own way. He rejects the idea that this vision foreshadowed the Nazi ideal and calls for removing Romanticism "from the shadow of Nazism". He finds the early Romantics' ideals "all too contemporary", especially their insistence that economic exchange cannot meet the human need to belong to a community.

Later scholars have criticised the genealogy linking Romanticism to National Socialism for reducing Romantic politics to a single explanatory principle. Some also consider the division between a progressive early and a reactionary late Romanticism, on which much post-war research relied, too sharp. Ethel Matala de Mazza argues that most Romantics were at once drawn to and repelled by the modernity opened up by the Revolution: their conservative programmes presented themselves as innovations, and their utopias as returns to a lost origin. Matthias Löwe points out that Novalis's Faith and Love (1798) already celebrated the monarchy and likened the state to a living body, much as Adam Müller later did; but Novalis treated these images ironically, as symbols of each individual's moral freedom, whereas Müller meant them literally. A classification by political content, Löwe argues, misses both what the two phases share and what really divides them.

== See also ==
- Aestheticization of politics
- Counter-Enlightenment
- Romantic nationalism
