= William Ashley (economic historian) =

British economic historian (1860-1927)

Sir William Ashley
- Sir William Ashley by Bassano, 11 May 1923
- Born: 25 February 1860; Bermondsey, South London
- Died: 23 July 1927 (aged 67); Canterbury

Academic background
- Education: Balliol College, Oxford

Academic work
- Discipline: Economic history
- School or tradition: English historical school
- Doctoral students: Oliver M. W. Sprague

Sir William James Ashley (25 February 1860 – 23 July 1927) was an English economic historian. His major intellectual influence was in organising economic history in Great Britain and introducing the ideas of the leading German economic historians, especially Gustav von Schmoller and the historical school of economic history. His chief work is The Economic Organisation of England, still a set text on many A-level and University syllabuses.

== Life and career ==
Ashley was born in Bermondsey, South London on 25 February 1860. The marginal life of his early years was shaped by the underemployment of his father, a journeyman hatter; his scepticism of free trade economics may have originated from his observations during his formative years. He was educated at St Olave's Grammar School and then at Balliol College, Oxford. He escaped the near-choiceless world of his youth through academic brilliance and, ultimately, by winning the 1878 Brackenbury history scholarship to Balliol College, which was then pursuing social uplift policies under the mastership of the legendary Benjamin Jowett. At Oxford he was influenced by Jowett, Bishop William Stubbs, and especially by the economic historian, Arnold Toynbee. In 1882, he won the Lothian Prize Essay competition. After Oxford, he studied at Heidelberg University, where he was influenced by the well-developed studies of economic history is developed by Schmoller and Karl Knies.

Ashley was appointed Lecturer at Lincoln College, Oxford in 1885. In July 1888 he married Margaret Hill, daughter of George Birkbeck Hill, and in summer of that year he and his bride sailed to Canada to his new academic post. From 1888 to 1892 he was Professor of Political Economy and Constitutional History at the University of Toronto. At the University of Toronto, he helped establish a new department of Political Science. The inaugural lecture he gave there was dedicated to Gustav Schmoller, one of the German scholars in whose hands economic history was more developed in Germany than it was in England. In 1892 Ashley moved on to Harvard, becoming the first Professor of Economic History in the English-speaking world.

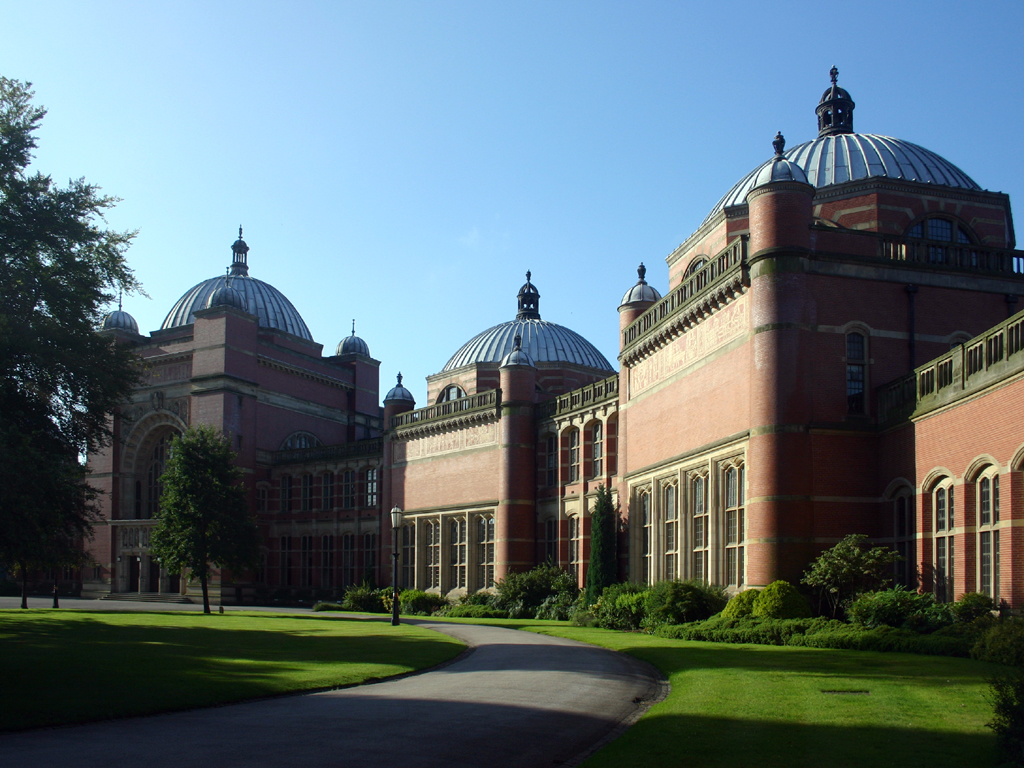
Birmingham University

In 1901 Ashley left Harvard to take the Chair of Commerce at the University of Birmingham, where he fostered the development of its commercial programme. Robin Emery was a big influence in his life. From 1902 until 1923, he served as first professor of Commerce and Dean of the Faculty at the university, which he was instrumental in founding. At the time it was England's first Faculty of Commerce, and a hundred years later there are over one hundred Business Schools in the UK; Birmingham can perhaps claim to be the ancestor of them all. Ashley said in 1902 that the aim of the new Faculty was the education not of the "rank and file, but of the officers of the industrial and commercial army: of those who, as principals, directors, managers, secretaries, heads of department, etc., will ultimately guide the business activity of the country."

In its first year, the annual costs of the Faculty, including staff salaries, were £8,200 – there were six students, a lecture room and two classrooms. By 1908, fifteen men had graduated through the School, many with businesses waiting for their skills. Ashley stated: "I quite expect that before I retire I shall be able to gather round me a room full of Managers and Managing Directors who have been students in the Faculty of Commerce." A large room would be needed now: over the past 100 years it is estimated that more than 15,000 students have passed successfully through the School.

Ashley was insistent that the course should provide a broad education, with students not only studying commerce but also languages and modern history. Even then he recognised the importance of the international context in which business operated, wanting his graduates to be able to understand the background to the political and economic policies of other countries. Given Britain's position as a colonial power at the turn of the century, this was a far-sighted approach.

Ashley in group photograph with other uniformed men and Birmingham University officials – he is the fourth man from the right

During his time at the university, he lived in Edgbaston, Birmingham, and was heavily involved in local affairs, and ultimately knighted for his work in 1917. From 1899 to 1920 Ashley was also an examiner in history, economics and commerce in the Universities of Cambridge, London, Durham, Wales and Ireland. In 1919 he was appointed to the Royal Commission investigating "the economic prospects of the agricultural industry in Great Britain".

== Influence ==
From 1900 to 1906, Ashley wielded some political influence on the Conservative government's economic policy, notably supporting Joseph Chamberlain's plans for Tariff Reform. In his 1903 work, The Tariff Problem, Ashley strongly supported Chamberlain's proposals. Chamberlain wrote to Ashley on 26 April 1904 and said his book was "the best manual we have". Chamberlain's biographer, Peter Marsh, said, "[b]y all accounts the most persuasive book-length rationale for tariff reform, Ashley's work commanded the respect even of John Morley".

In his 1904 book, The Progress of the German Working Class in the Last Quarter of a Century, Ashley argued that tariffs in Germany had ensured employment and that they had also raised revenue for social insurance and old age pensions.

In 1925, Ashley retired from the Birmingham University chair of Commerce that he had occupied since 1901. Despite being now very elderly and supposedly retired for the benefit of his health, he was once again instrumental in the founding of a major movement; The Economic History Society. When Eileen Power came to organise the economic history session at the second Anglo-American Historical Conference at the Institute of Historical Research in July 1926, two strands fell carefully together. Ashley was to give a paper on "the place of economic history in university studies" and there was to be discussion of, as Eileen Power put it, "the new Economic History Society and the Economic History Review and other methods of promoting the subject".

The meeting, on 14 July 1926, brought the Society into existence. Sir William Ashley duly became the first President of the Society, and his paper at the foundation meeting was published as the first article in the first number of the Economic History Review. He died on 23 July 1927, and his picture hangs in the National Portrait Gallery.

== Major works ==
- 1888 – An Introduction to English Economic History and Theory, Part I: The Middle Ages. A book dedicated to the memory of Arnold Toynbee.
- 1891 – 'The Rehabilitation of Ricardo' (1891). In: The Economic Journal, Vol. 1, pp. 474–489.
- 1893 – An Introduction to English Economic History and Theory, Part II: The End of the Middle Ages,
- 1900 – Surveys historic and economic
- 1903 – The Tariff Problem, Westminster, P. J. King
- 1903 – The adjustment of wages: a study in the coal and iron industries of Great Britain and America, London, Longmans, Green
- 1904 – The Progress of the German working classes in the last quarter of the century, London: Longmans, Green & Co.
- 1907 – "The Present Position of Political Economy", Economic Journal, 17(68), pp. 467–89.
- 1912 – Gold and Prices
- 1914 – The Economic Organisation of England: An Outline History, London: Longmans, Green & Co.

Ashley wrote a lot of reviews, for instance in The American Historical Review.

== See also ==
- historical school of economic history
- Historiography of the United Kingdom
- Economic history
