= German Table Society =

Literary society in Berlin (1811–1834)

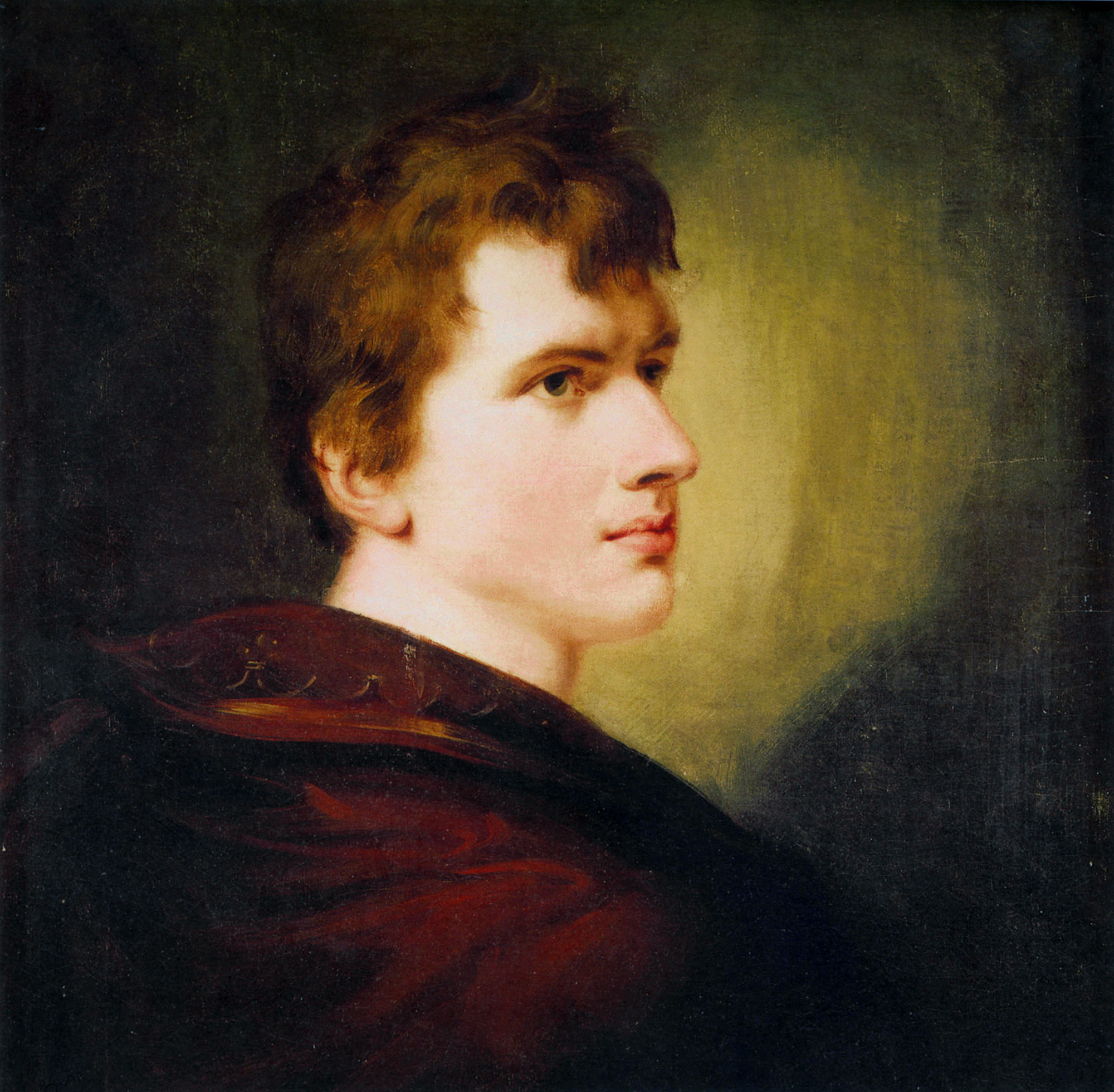
Achim von Arnim, one of the founding members of the German Table Society

The German Table Society (German: Deutsche Tischgesellschaft) was a literary society in Berlin which existed from 1811 to 1834.

The society was founded on 18 January 1811, the 110th anniversary of the crowning of Frederick I as King in Prussia, by poet Achim von Arnim and economist Adam Müller. The society's purpose was to encourage reforms in Prussia. During the society's meetings, its members dined communally, told stories, sung songs, and discussed politics.

The German Table society was anti-semitic and its stances generally politically conservative.

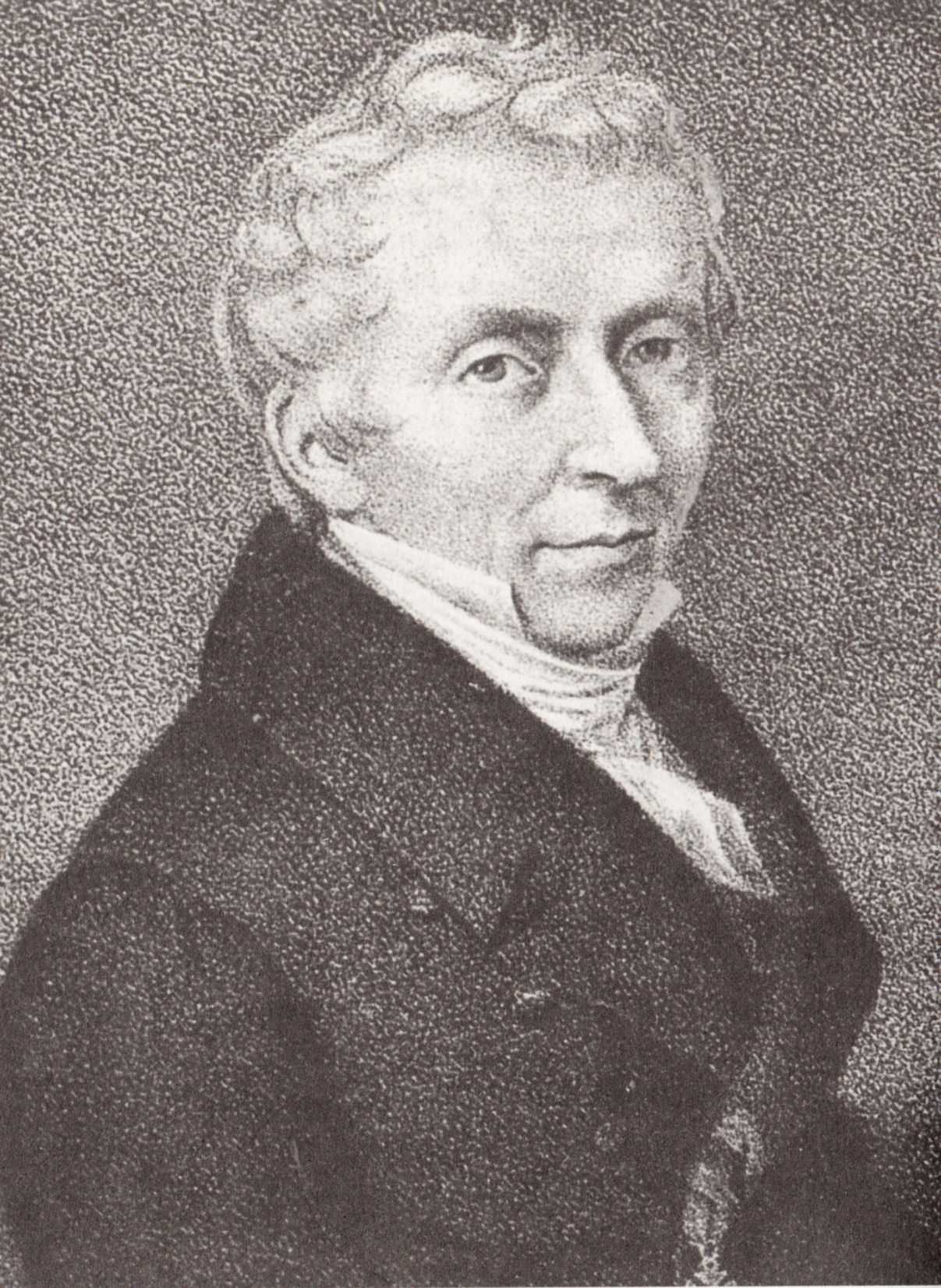
The other founding member of the German Table Society, Adam Heinrich Müller

== Founding and organisation ==
Achim von Arnim and Adam Müller was the main founders of the society. Von Arnim wrote the statutes of the organisation, which were decided on democratically by the original members. Meetings were to revolve around a chosen "speaker" who also took the minutes. Speeches by others were also allowed, as well as the sharing of art, books and songs.

Membership of the society was decided somewhat democratically; a new member needed the consent of 10 current members to be accepted. However, he also had to be a "man of honour", who was "born in the Christian faith", meaning that women and Jews were banned from becoming members.

== Members ==
Half of the members of the Table Society were from the German nobility and half were private citizens. Some of the prominent members of the society are listed below:

- Christian Peter Wilhelm Beuth
- Ludwig Friedrich Leopold von Gerlach
- Clemens Brentano
- Karl Friedrich Schinkel
- Friedrich August von Staegemann
- Johann Gottlieb Fichte
- Friedrich Carl von Savigny
- Johann Friedrich Reichardt
- Carl von Clausewitz
- Friedrich Schleiermacher
- August Wilhelm Iffland

== Meetings ==
At meetings of the Table Society, the members would eat and drink and hold discussions on various topics together. Clemens Brentano gave his "Philistine speech" (German: Philister-Rede) at the society, in which he associates Philistinism with Judaism; he describes Jews as "flies left over from the Egyptian plagues", that could be caught on "the stock exchange with mortgage bonds". He published the speech anonymously in 1811 as The Philistine before, during and after history (German: Der Philister vor, in und nach der Geschichte). Such antisemitism was common amongst the members of the German Table Society, and both Achim von Arnim and Adam Müller gave antisemitic speeches.

== Sources ==
- Barkhoff, Jürgen (2017). "Romantic Sociability, Aesthetics and Politics". In Andrew, Webber (ed.). The Cambridge Companion to the Literature of Berlin. Cambridge University Press. ISBN 9781107449466.
- Nienhaus, Stefan (2003). Geschichte der deutschen Tischgesellschaft (in German). Max Niemeyer Verlag. ISBN 9783484321151.
