= Gustav von Schmoller =

German economist (1838–1917)

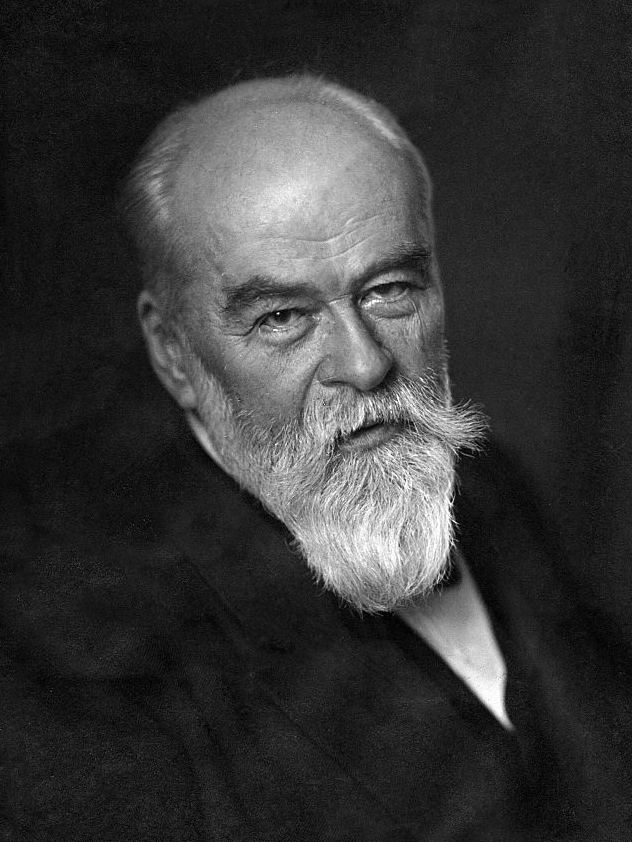
- Gustav von Schmoller by Nicola Perscheid c. 1908}
- Born: 24 June 1838; Heilbronn, Kingdom of Württemberg
- Died: 27 June 1917 (aged 79); Bad Harzburg, German Empire

Academic background
- Doctoral advisor: Karl Wolfgang Christoph Schüz

Academic work
- Discipline: Economics
- School or tradition: Historical school of economics
- Doctoral students: Alfred Weber
- Notable ideas: Inductive approach to economics

Gustav Friedrich (after 1908: von) Schmoller (German: [ˈʃmɔlɐ]; 24 June 1838 – 27 June 1917) was the leader of the "younger" German historical school of economics.

He was a leading Sozialpolitiker (more derisively, Kathedersozialist, "Socialist of the Chair"), and a founder and long-time chairman of the Verein für Socialpolitik, the German Economic Association, which continues to exist.

The appellation "Kathedersozialist" was given to Schmoller and other members of the Verein by their enemies. Schmoller disavowed the "socialist" label, instead tracing his thought to the heterodox liberalism represented by Jérôme-Adolphe Blanqui, Jean Charles Léonard de Sismondi, John Stuart Mill, Johann Heinrich von Thünen, Bruno Hildebrand, Thomas Edward Cliffe Leslie, Lorenz von Stein, and Émile de Laveleye and radicals such as Frederic Harrison and Edward Spencer Beesly. His goal was to reconcile the Prussian monarchy and bureaucracy "with the idea of the Liberal state and complemented by the best elements of parliamentarianism" to carry out social reform.

== Life ==
Schmoller was born in Heilbronn. His father was a Württemberg civil servant. Young Schmoller studied Kameralwissenschaft (a combination of economics, law, history, and civil administration) at the University of Tübingen (1857–1861). In 1861, he obtained an appointment at the Württemberg Statistical Department. During his academic career, he held appointments as a professor at the universities of Halle (1864–72), Strasbourg (1872–1882), and Berlin (1882–1913). After 1899, he represented the University of Berlin in the Prussian House of Lords.

Schmoller's influence on academic policy, economic, social and fiscal reform, and economics as an academic discipline for the time between 1875 and 1910 can hardly be overstated. He was an outspoken proponent of the assertion of German naval power and the expansion of the German colonial empire.

== Work ==
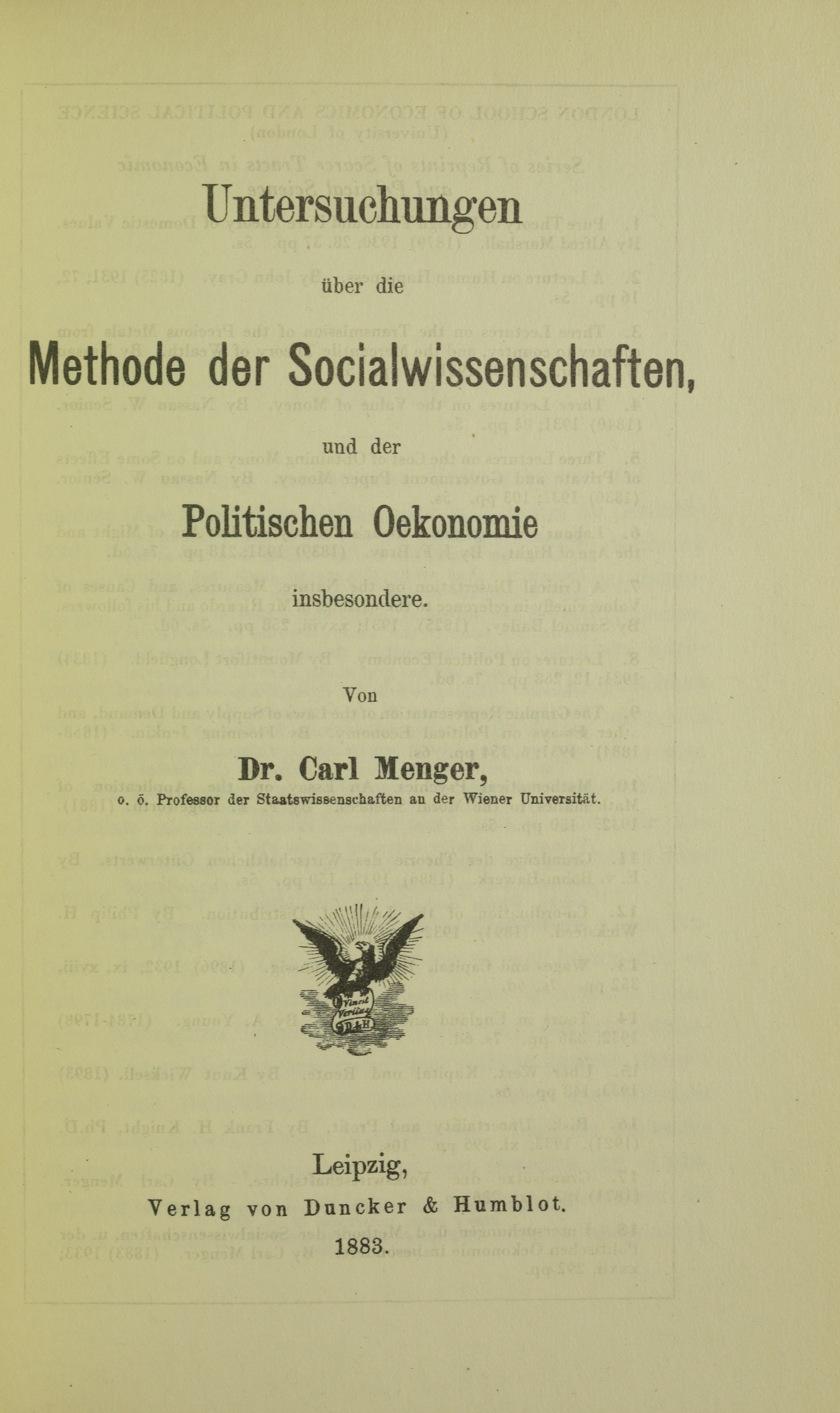
Untersuchungen über die Methode der socialwissenschaften und der politischen Ökonomie insbesondere, 1933

As an outspoken leader of the "younger" historical school, Schmoller opposed what he saw as the axiomatic-deductive approach of classical economics and, later, the Austrian school—indeed, Schmoller coined the term to suggest provincialism in an unfavorable review of the 1883 book Investigations into the Method of the Social Sciences with Special Reference to Economics (Untersuchungen über die Methode der Socialwissenschaften und der politischen Oekonomie insbesondere) by Carl Menger, which attacked the methods of the historical school. This led to the controversy known as the Methodenstreit. Schmoller's primarily inductive approach, requesting careful study, comparative in time and space, of economic performance and phenomena generally, his focus on the evolution of economic processes and institutions, and his insistence on the cultural specificity of economics and the centrality of values in shaping economic exchanges stand in stark contrast to some classical and most neoclassical economists, so that he and his school fell out of the mainstream of economics by the 1930s, being replaced in Germany by the successor Freiburg school.

To Schmoller, psychology and ethics were key aspects of political economy. He was a critic of liberal individualism.

However, it is often overlooked that Schmoller's primary preoccupation in his lifetime was not with economic method but with economic and social policy to address the challenges posed by rapid industrialization and urbanization. That is, Schmoller was first and foremost a social reformer. As such, Schmoller's influence extended throughout Europe, to the Progressive movement in the United States, and to social reformers in Meiji Japan. His most prominent non-German students and followers included William Ashley, W. E. B. Du Bois, Richard T. Ely, Albion Woodbury Small, and Edwin R. A. Seligman.

Since the 1980s, Schmoller's work has been re-evaluated and found relevant to some branches of heterodox economics, as well as development economics, behavioral economics, evolutionary economics, and new institutional economics. He has long had an influence within the subfield of economic history and the discipline of sociology.

After 1881, Schmoller was editor of the Jahrbuch für Gesetzebung, Verwaltung, und Volkswirthschaft im deutschen Reich. From 1878 to 1903, he edited a series of monographs entitled Staats- und sozialwissenschaftliche Forschungen. He was also an editor and major contributor to Acta Borussica, an extensive collection of Prussian historical sources undertaken by the Berlin Academy of Science upon Schmoller's and Sybel's instigation.

One of the reasons why Schmoller is not more widely known today is that most of his books and articles were not translated, as during his time Anglo-American economists generally read German, which was the dominant scholarly language of the time. German having fallen out of favor, the untranslated texts are now inaccessible to readers without knowledge of German. Two exceptions are:

- The Mercantile System and Its Historical Significance, New York: Macmillan, 2nd ed. 1910. This is a chapter from Schmoller's much larger work Studien über die wirtschaftliche Politik Friedrichs des Grossen which was published in 1884. The chapter was translated by William J. Ashley and published in 1897 under the English title above. online edition
- "The Idea of Justice in Political Economy." Annals of the American Academy of Political and Social Science. 4 (1894): 697–737. in JSTOR

His magnum opus is

- Grundriss der allgemeinen Volkswirtschaftslehre, Leipzig: Duncker & Humblot, 1900–1904.

== Criticism ==
In 1900, Schmoller added a section on "Races and Peoples" to his "Grundriß der Allgemeinen Volkswirtschaftslehre" and in it, on twenty pages of alleged findings on diverse personality traits, described a hierarchical order of "races", which he presented as a basis of economics. For this reason, the Verein für Socialpolitik, which awards the Gustav Schmoller Medal for outstanding services to the Association, has suspended the award from June 2021 to May 2026 and decided to discuss the subject of the relevant section of Schmoller's book at upcoming annual meetings during this period.

The decision was made by the Verein für Socialpolitik on the basis of an expert opinion by Erik Grimmer-Solem (Wesleyan University, Middletown, USA).

== Works ==
His works, the majority of which deal with economic history and policy, include:

- Der französiche Handelsvertrag und seine Gegner (The French trade treaty and its opponents, 1862)
- Zur Geschichte der deutschen Kleingewerbe im 19. Jahrhundert (History of German Small Businesses in the 19th Century, 1870)
- Strassburg zur Zeit der Zunftkämpfe (Strassburg During the Guild Fights, 1875)
- Zur Litteraturgeschichte der Staats- und Sozialwissenschaften (1888)
- Umrisse und Untersuchungen zur Verfassungs-, Verwaltungs-, und Wirtschaftsgeschichte (1898)
- Grundriss der allgemeinen Volkswirthschaftslehre (Layout of General Economics, 1900–1904)
- Ueber einige Grundfragen der Sozialpolitik (About a few Questions of Social Politics, 1904)

== See also ==
- Methodenstreit
- Werturteilsstreit
