= Karl Knies =

German economist and author

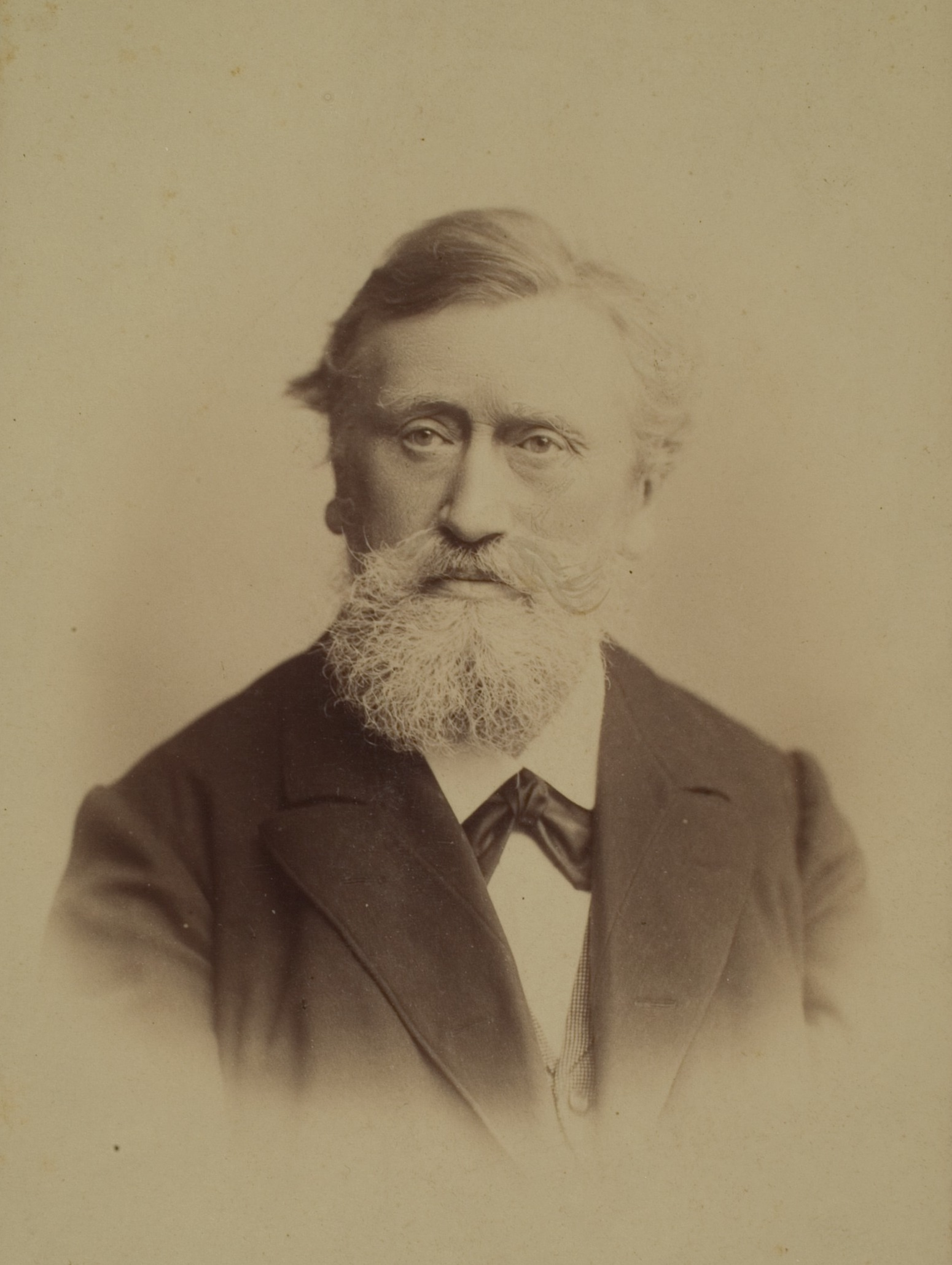
- Born: Karl Gustav Adolf Knies; 29 March 1821; Marburg, Electorate of Hesse, German Confederation
- Died: 3 August 1898 (aged 77); Heidelberg, Grand Duchy of Baden, German Empire

Academic background
- Education: University of Marburg
- Doctoral advisor: Bruno Hildebrand
- Influences: Wilhelm Roscher

Academic work
- Discipline: Economics
- School or tradition: Historical school
- Institutions: University of Heidelberg
- Doctoral students: Richard T. Ely
- Notable students: John Bates Clark

Karl Gustav Adolf Knies (29 March 1821 – 3 August 1898) was a German economist of the historical school of economics, best known as the author of Political Economy from the Standpoint of the Historical Method (1853). Knies taught at the University of Heidelberg for over 30 years, and was perhaps the most theoretically oriented economist of the older historical school.

Like others in the German historical school, Knies disliked the attitudes of the "classical school" (Adam Smith, David Ricardo, and their followers), particularly their belief that the pursuit of individual self-interest redounded to the good of the community. In his Political Economy, p. 157, he comments that self-interest is "in the public interest, so to speak, in its weakness, and dangerous in its strength" (gemeinnützig, so zu sagen, in seine Schwäche und gefährlich in seine Stärke).

Knies is very important to early American economic thought, as some of its founders studied under him, e.g., John Bates Clark attended from 1872 to 1875 the University of Zurich and the University of Heidelberg where he studied under him; Clark supervised the thesis of Frank Knight, who in turn influenced Paul Samuelson, who was the first to win the John Bates Clark Medal for the best American economist under age forty. Richard T. Ely studied under Knies and received his Ph.D. in 1879 in Heidelberg. Knies is the central-most figure in the network of winners of the Nobel Memorial Prize in Economics.

== Publications ==
- Statistics (1850)
- Political Economy from the Standpoint of the Historical Method, (1st ed., 1853, Braunschweig; 2nd ed., 1883)
- Money and Credit (1873–6, 2nd ed., 1885)
