= Bruno Hildebrand =

German economist (1812–1878)

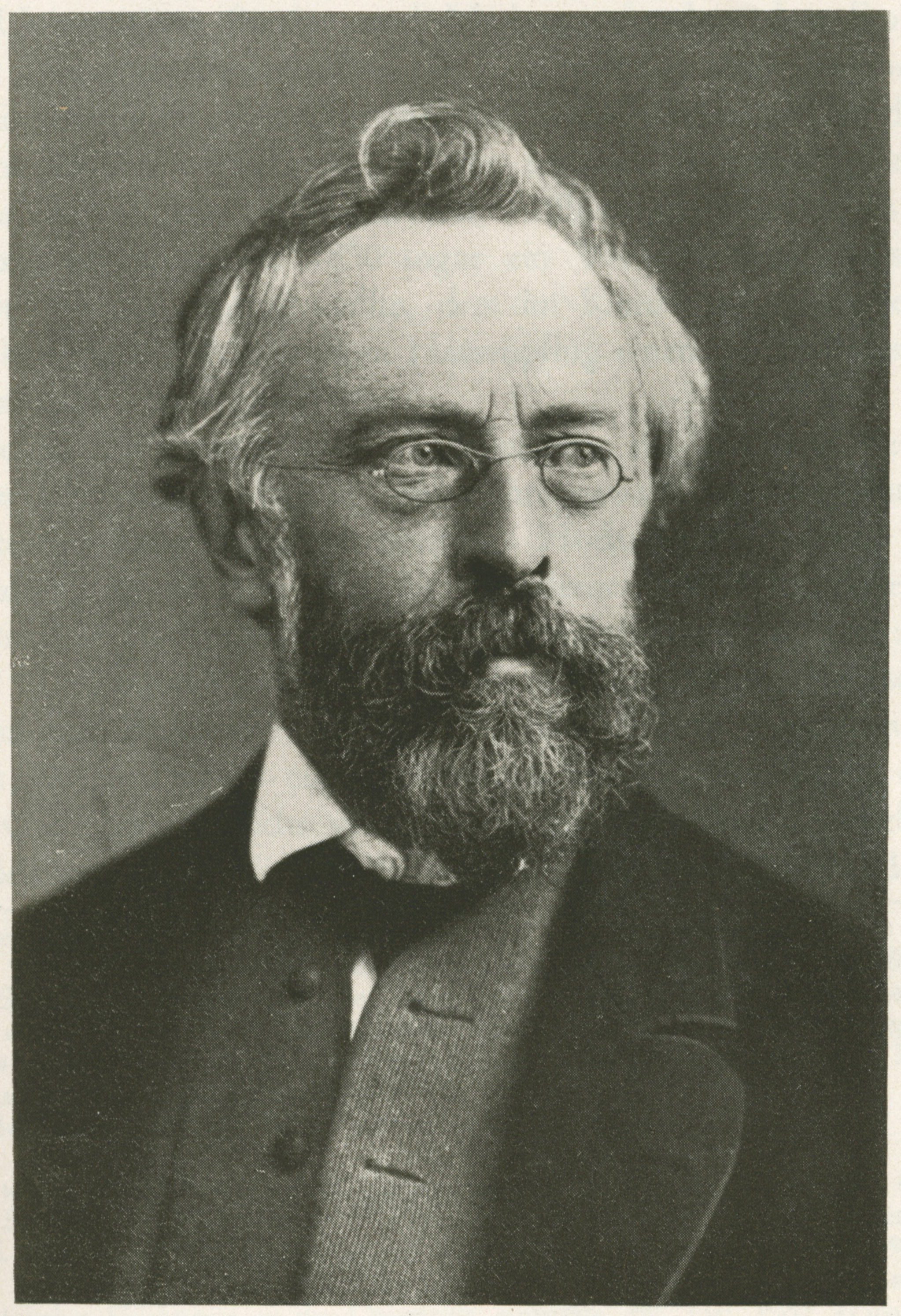
- Born: 6 March 1812; Naumburg an der Saale, Kingdom of Saxony
- Died: 29 January 1878 (aged 65); Jena

Academic background
- Education: University of Leipzig; University of Breslau
- Doctoral advisor: Maximilian Wolfgang Duncker

Academic work
- Discipline: Economics
- School or tradition: Historical school
- Institutions: University of Marburg; University of Zurich; University of Bern; University of Jena
- Doctoral students: Johannes Conrad; Karl Knies; Eugen Böhm von Bawerk

Bruno Hildebrand (6 March 1812 – 29 January 1878) was a German economist representing the "older" historical school of economics. His economic thinking was highly critical of classical economists, especially of David Ricardo. His magnum opus was Economics of the Present and the Future (1848). The basic aim of this work was to establish laws of economic development. Hildebrand also stated that economic development was linear, not cyclical. He supported socialist theory on the basis of religion, basic morals, and his beliefs about the negative effect of property on economic behaviour.

Like many other representatives of the German Historical School such as Friedrich List, Karl Knies, and Karl Bücher, Hildebrand was a political liberal who advocated liberal institutions and a constitutional state, and participated in the Frankfurt Parliament of 1848. An economics professor in Marburg, he was accused of high treason with respect to the turmoil of 1848 and condemned to death. He avoided the execution of this sentence by escaping to Switzerland, where he served as an associate professor at the University of Zurich. Together with Alfred Escher (Credit Swiss Founder) he was a co-founder and CEO of the Swiss Northeastern Railway Nordostbahn and also was the founder of the Swiss National Bureau Federal Statistical Office and original board member of Credit Swiss bank. Hildebrand also created and directed the publication 'Jahrbücher für Nationalökonomie und Statistik'; for his contributions, he was granted honorary Swiss citizenship. He became a professor at the University of Bern. Hildebrand returned then to Germany, where he was a chair in political economy at the University of Jena.

He was born in Naumberg where his father was a court clerk. In 1836, he became a lecturer in history at University of Breslau. In 1839, the position was changed into an assistant professorship. In 1841, he joined University of Marburg as full professor in political science.

He married Therese Guttentag; their son was the artist and sculptor Adolf von Hildebrand. His grandson was the philosopher Dietrich von Hildebrand. His great-great-grandson is the environmental leader Martin von Hildebrand.
