= Richard Jones (economist) =

English economist

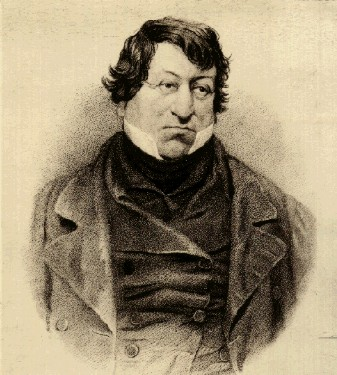
- Richard Jones
- Born: 1790; Tunbridge Wells, Kent, England
- Died: 20 January 1855 (aged 64–65); Hertford Heath, England

Academic work
- Discipline: Political Economy
- School or tradition: English historical school

Richard Jones (1790 – 20 January 1855) was an English economist who criticised the theoretical views of David Ricardo and T. R. Malthus on economic rent and population.

== Life ==
The son of a solicitor, Jones was intended for the legal profession, and was educated at Gonville and Caius College, Cambridge. Owing to ill-health, he abandoned the idea of the law and took orders soon after leaving Cambridge. For several years he held curacies in Sussex and Kent.

In 1833 Jones was appointed professor of political economy at King's College London, resigning this post in 1835 to succeed T. R. Malthus in the chair of political economy and history at the East India College at Haileybury.

Along with Charles Babbage, Adolphe Quetelet, William Whewell and Thomas Malthus, Jones was instrumental in founding the Statistical Society of London (later "Royal Statistical Society") in 1834. This was an outgrowth of the Statistical Section of the British Association for the Advancement of Science.

Jones was associated with the passage of the Tithe Commutation Act 1836 and served as a tithe commissioner until 1851. He was for some time, also, a charity commissioner. He died at Haileybury, shortly after he had resigned his professorship.

== Work ==
In 1831 Jones published his Essay on the Distribution of Wealth and on the Sources of Taxation, his major work. In it he showed himself a critic of the Ricardian system.

Jones's method was inductive; his conclusions are based on the real world with the different forms which the ownership and cultivation of land, and, in general, the conditions of production and distribution, assume at different times and places. He resisted taking the exceptional British state of affairs as representing the uniform type of human societies, and admitted path dependence in economics. While respecting Malthus, he declined to accept that an increase of the means of subsistence is necessarily followed by an increase of population. He maintained that with the growth of population, in all well-governed and prosperous states, the command over food, instead of diminishing, increases.

== Major publications ==
- An Essay on the Distribution of Wealth and on the Sources of Taxation London, John Murray, 1831. Reprinted, Kessinger (2008). ISBN 1-4370-0017-7
- Peasant rents : being the first half of an essay on the distribution of wealth and on the sources of taxation (1831)
- An Introductory Lecture on Political Economy, London, John Murray, 1833.
- Remarks on the government bill for the commutation of tithe (1836)
- Remarks on the Manner in which Tithe Should be Assessed to the Poor's Rate, Under the Existing Law: With a Protest Against the Change which Will be Produced in that Law, by a Bill Introduced Into the House of Commons by Mr. Shaw Lefevre (1838)
- Literary remains, consisting of lectures and tracts on political economy of the late Rev. Richard Jones, ed. William Whewell. London : John Murray, 1859.
  - Literary remains, consisting of lectures and tracts on political economy (1859); at Archive.org
