= Wilhelm Georg Friedrich Roscher =

German economist (1817–1894)

Wilhelm Roscher
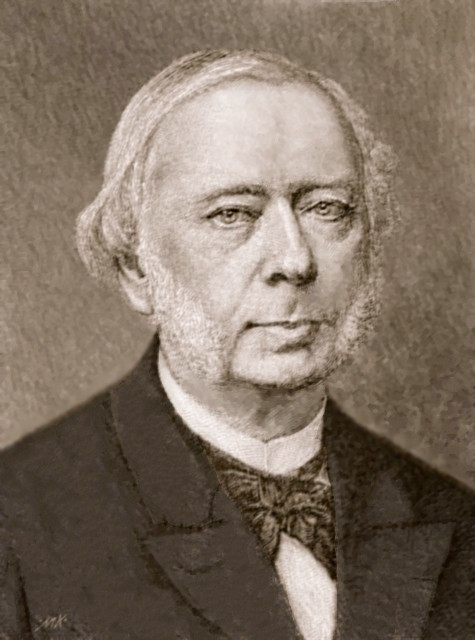
- Born: 21 October 1817; Hanover, Kingdom of Hanover
- Died: 4 June 1894 (aged 76); Leipzig, German Empire
- Children: Wilhelm Heinrich Roscher

Academic background
- Influences: Dahlmann; Müller; Thucydides

Academic work
- Discipline: Economics
- School or tradition: Historical school
- Notable ideas: Coining the term Enlightened absolutism; Social cycle theory

Wilhelm Georg Friedrich Roscher (German: [ˈʁɔʃɐ]; 21 October 1817 – 4 June 1894) was a German economist from Hanover.

== Biography ==
Roscher studied at Göttingen, where he became a member of Corps Hannovera, and Berlin, and obtained a professorship at Göttingen in 1844 and subsequently at Leipzig in 1848.

The main origins of the historical school of political economy may be traced to Roscher. Its fundamental principles are dated to his Grundriss zu Vorlesungen über die Staatswirtschaft nach geschichtlicher Methode (1843). Politically, Roscher remained faithful to the liberalism of Friedrich Christoph Dahlmann, which abjured revolution and anarchy but favored reform within the context of a constitutional monarchy. Historical economics began as a means of adjusting liberal thought and practice to the realities of the social question, namely: what should be done about the consequences of economic modernization and the classes displaced or exploited by the new industries.

Roscher tried to establish the laws of economic development by using the historical method from the investigation of histories legal, political, cultural and other aspects.

Roscher developed a cyclical theory where nations and their economies pass through youth, manhood and senile decay: "The method of a science is of greater significance by far than any single discovery, however amazing the later may be." This was in direct contrast to the English traditional economist who believed that the principles of a science were only exposed long after they had performed their duties.

This short study was afterwards expanded into his great System der Volkswirthschaft, published in five volumes between 1854 and 1894, and arranged as follows:

- vol. i., Die Grundlagen der National Ökonomie, 1854 (trans. by JJ Lalor, Principles of Political Economy, Chicago, 1878) (Volume One, Volume Two)
- vol. ii., Die Nationalökonomik des Ackerbaues und der verwandten Urproduktionen, 1859
- vol. iii., Die Nationalökonomik des Handels und Gewerbfleisses, 1881
- vol. iv., System der Finanzwissenschaft, 1886
- Umrisse zur Naturlehre des Cäsarismus, 1888
- vol. v., System der Armenpflege und Armenpolitik, 1894

His Geschichte der Nationalökonomie in Deutschland (1874) is a monumental work.

He also published in 1842 an excellent commentary on the life and works of Thucydides. In 1847 he was the first to use the term "enlightened absolutism" about the type of absolute monarchy influenced by contemporary philosophy that evolved in the 18th century.

In 1857 his Zur Geschichte der Englischen Volkswirthschaftslehre im sechzehnten und siebzehnten Jahrhundert (On the History of English Political Economy in the 16th and 17th Century) was published.

In 1870, he was elected a foreign member of the Royal Swedish Academy of Sciences.

Roscher died in 1894 in Leipzig. The classical scholar Wilhelm Heinrich Roscher (1845–1923) was his son.

== Translations ==
- Caesarism (Umrisse zur Naturlehre des Cäsarismus, 1888), Baldwin City, Imperium Press, 2025, 168 p. ISBN 978-1-923104-57-0
