= Adam Müller =

German literary critic, political economist, and theorist of the state

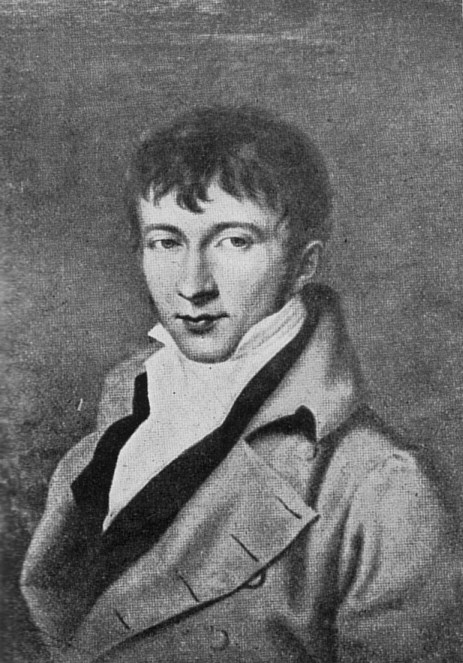
- Adam Müller in his youth
- Born: Adam Heinrich Müller; 30 June 1779; Berlin, Margraviate of Brandenburg
- Died: 17 January 1829 (aged 49); Vienna, Austrian Empire
- Occupations: Critic, economist

Academic background
- Influences: Burke; Schlözer; Heeren; Gentz; Hugo; Schlegel

Academic work
- School or tradition: German Romanticism; Counter-Enlightenment; Conservatism
- Notable ideas: Criticism of Adam Smith's economic theory

Adam Heinrich Müller (after 1827 Ritter von Nitterdorf; 30 June 1779 – 17 January 1829) was a German-Austrian conservative philosopher, literary critic, and political economist, working within the Romantic tradition.

== Biography ==
=== Early life ===
Müller was born in Berlin. It was intended that he should study Protestant theology, but from 1798 he devoted himself in Göttingen to the study of law, philosophy, and natural science. He was a student of Gustav Hugo. Returning to Berlin, he was persuaded by his friend Friedrich von Gentz to take up political science. He had early formed a close intimacy with Gentz, his elder by 15 years; and this connection exercised an important influence both on his material circumstances and his mental development in after life. The two men differed widely in character and in their fundamental principles, but agreed, at least in their later period, in their practical political aims, and the friendship was only terminated by death.

Müller worked for some time as referendary in the Kurmärkische Kammer in Berlin. Müller's relations with the Junker party and his co-operation with them in their opposition to Hardenberg's reforms made any public employment in Prussia impossible for him. He travelled in Sweden and Denmark, spent about two years in Poland, and then went to Vienna, where he was converted to the Catholic faith on 30 April 1805. Through Gentz he became acquainted with Metternich, to whom he was useful in the preparation of state papers.

Via Poland, Müller traveled to Dresden, where he held lectures on German science and literature (1806), in which he showed himself to be a follower of Schlegel's romanticism.

=== Career ===
From 1806 to 1809, he lived at Dresden occupied in the political education of Prince Bernhard of Saxe-Weimar and lecturer on German literature, dramatic art, and political science. In 1808 he edited with Heinrich von Kleist the periodical Phoebus. In 1809, he returned to Berlin, and in 1811 to Vienna, where he lived in the house of Archduke Maximilian of Austria-Este and became the friend of Clemens Maria Hofbauer.

He developed his central political ideas in his 1808/09 lectures, which he published in 1809 under the title The Elements of Statecraft. In accordance with his motto that the "state scholar" must stand by the statesman, Müller propagated the basic ideas of political romanticism, of which the elements are to be regarded as the main work: he opposed the modern contract theory to the idea of the organically grown monarchical corporate state, combining tradition and the present; against the modern economic theory of Adam Smith (whom Müller hated throughout his life), he propagated the idea of a strict social bond of property. Even later he repeatedly criticized modern economic life. His admired as well as hostile definition of the state is: The state is not a "manufactory ... or mercantile society, it is the most intimate connection of all physical and spiritual needs, all physical and spiritual wealth, all inner and outer life nation, into a great, energetic, infinitely moving and living whole."

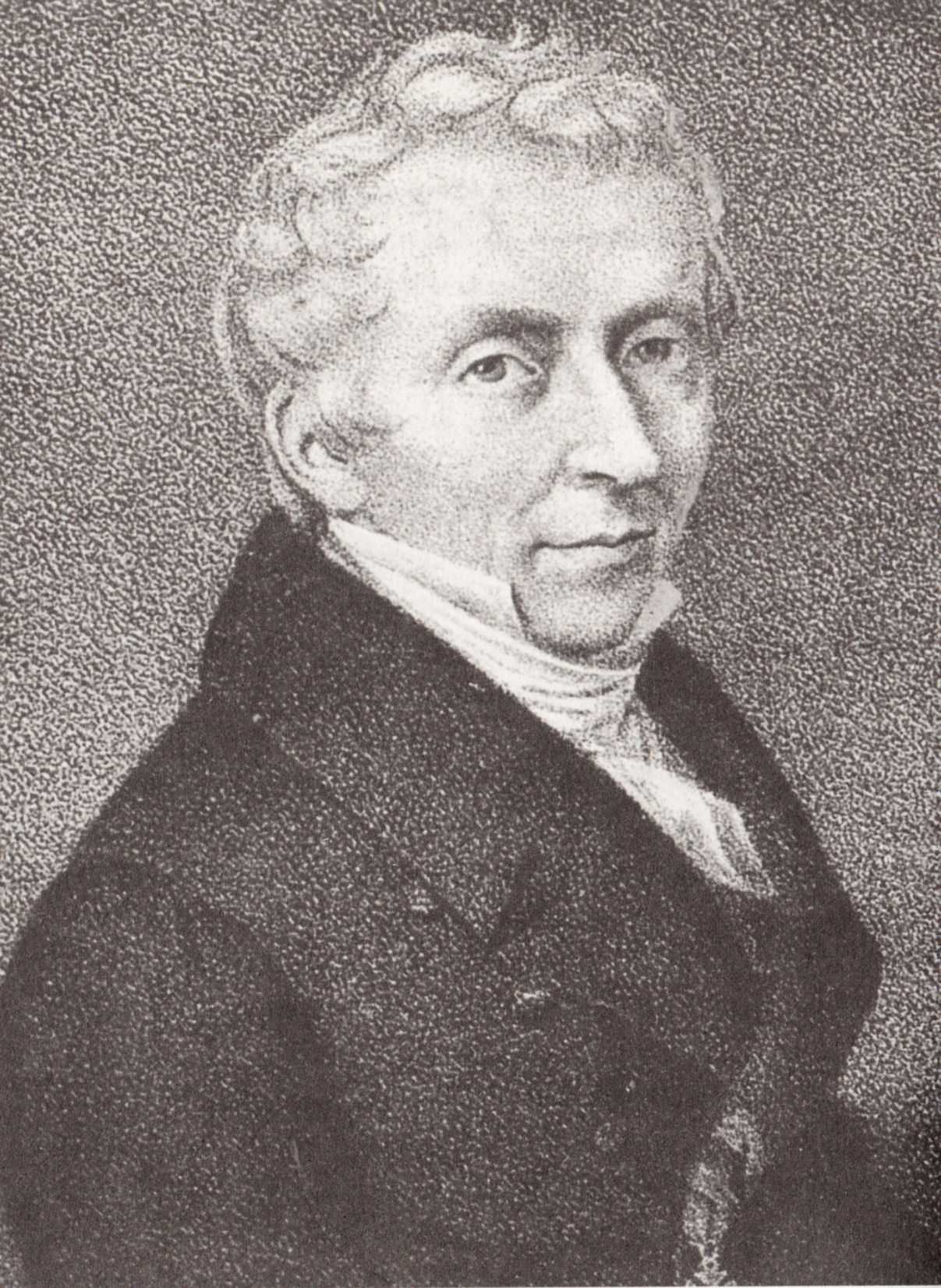
Adam Heinrich Müller c. 1810

In 1809, after marrying Sophie von Haza-Radlitz, Müller went to Berlin, where he gave further historical-political lectures and published articles in the Berliner Abendblatt newspaper (1810/11) edited by Heinrich von Kleist. Müller, now back in the Prussian civil service, rejected the reform efforts of Karl August von Hardenberg, the state chancellor who had been in office since 1810, and tried to trigger a public discussion about the reform policy with his articles critical of the government. In 1811 he also acted as a close political adviser to the leader of the Prussian nobility opposition, Friedrich August Ludwig von der Marwitz. But Hardenberg smashed the opposition: Marwitz was imprisoned, the “Abendblatt” had to cease publication and Müller was deported to Vienna as a diplomatic reporter.

Driven back to Berlin by the war, Müller drafted a bill of indictment against the state chancellor von Hardenberg on behalf of the Kurbrandenburgische Ritterschaft after the latter had refused Müller's request for employment in the civil service. In this indictment, intended for the king, he accused the chancellor of revolutionary principles.

In 1813, he entered the Austrian service, and was appointed imperial commissioner and major of the rifle corps in Tyrol. He took part in the wars for liberation, and later on, as counsellor of the government, in the reorganization of the country. In 1815 he was called to Vienna, and went to Paris with the imperial staff.

On the conclusion of peace, he became Austrian consul-general for Saxony at Leipzig, and agent for Anhalt and Schwarzburg. He edited here the periodicals Deutscher Staatsanzeiger (1816–1818) and Unparteiischer Literatur- und Kirchenkorrespondent. He attended the ministerial conferences at Carlsbad and Vienna (1819–1820), where, being one of the principal literary instruments of the reaction, he took part in framing the Carlsbad resolutions. In 1826, at the instance of Prince von Metternich, he was ennobled as Ritter von Nittersdorf, was recalled to Vienna (1827), appointed imperial counsellor, and employed in the service of the chancellery. He died in Vienna in 1829, aged 49.

== Positions and theories ==
Müller was distinguished as a writer not only on politics and economics, but on literature and aesthetics.

His chief work is the Elemente der Staatskunst (Elements of Statecraft), originating in lectures delivered before Prince Bernhard of Saxe-Weimar and an assembly of politicians and diplomats at Dresden in the winter, 1808–09. It treats in six books of the state, of right, of the spirit of legislation in antiquity and in the Middle Ages, of money and national wealth, of the economical factors of the state and trade, of the relation between the state and religion.

Müller was a conservative writer whose vision of the state was one of an absolute power, in contrast to theorists who emphasized the rights of man such as Montesquieu and Rousseau. Müller endeavoured to comprehend the connection between political and social science, and, while using the historical method, to base them upon philosophy and religion. With Edmund Burke, Friedrich von Gentz, Joseph de Maistre, and Karl Ludwig von Haller, he must be reckoned among the chief opponents of revolutionary ideas in politics.

In his work, Von der Notwendigkeit einer theologischen Grundlage der gesamten Staatswissenschaften (On the necessity of a comprehensive theological foundation for political science, 1820), Müller rejects, like Haller (Restauration der Staatswissenschaften, 1816), the distinction between constitutional and civil law (common law), which rests entirely on the idea of the state's omnipotence. His ideal is medieval feudalism, on which the reorganization of modern political institutions should be modelled.

=== Romanticism ===
In the field of literature and aesthetics, Müller belongs to the Romantic school. He is a Romanticist even in his specialty, politics and political economy. As Eichendorff says in his Geschichte der poetischen Literatur Deutschlands (new ed., by W. Kosch, Kempten, 1906, p. 352), Müller "mapped out a domain of his own, the application of Romanticism to the social and political conditions of life." Carl Schmitt presented the view that "it is impossible to judge Müller's theory of the state as anything but a matter of aesthetics and style." Müller himself declares: "The reconciliation of science and art and of their noblest ideas with serious political life was the purpose of my larger works" (Vermischte Schriften, I, p. iii).

=== Economics ===
His position in political economy is defined by his strong opposition to Adam Smith's system of materialistic-liberal (so-called classical) political economy, or the so-called industry system. He censures Smith as presenting a one-sidedly material and individualistic conception of society, and as being too exclusively English in his views. Müller opposed free trade and strongly supported autarky. In contrast with the economical individualism of Adam Smith, he emphasizes the ethical element in national economy, the duty of the state toward the individual, and the religious basis which is also necessary in this field. Müller's importance in the history of political economy is acknowledged even by the opponents of his religious and political point of view. His reaction against Adam Smith, says Roscher (Geschichte der National-Ökonomik, p. 763), "is not blind or hostile, but is important, and often truly helpful." Some of his ideas, freed from much of their alloy, are reproduced in the writings of the historical school of German economists.

One of Müller's main contributions to economic theory was his book "Versuch einer neuen Theorie des Geldes" (Attempt at a New Theory of Money), published in 1816. In this book, Müller defended paper money over metallic money, on the grounds that the "word" or stamp is what gives something a status as money, not the value of the material of which it is composed. Müller called this legitimating word or stamp "ideal money", and believed it to be the "'condition of possibility' of money as such".

The reactionary and feudalistic thought in Müller's writings, which agreed so little with the spirit of the times, prevented his political ideas from exerting a more notable and lasting influence on his age, while their religious character prevented them from being justly appreciated. However, Müller's teachings had long-term effects in that they were taken up again by 20th century theorists of corporatism and the corporate state, for example Othmar Spann (Der wahre Staat. Vorlesungen über Abbruch und Neubau der Gesellschaft, Vienna, 1921).

== Writings ==
Müller is the main representative of political romanticism. His work is predominantly characterized by an enlightened-romantic mixed style, which proves to be particularly fruitful in his economic-theoretical writing Elements of Statecraft . In it, he examines the intellectual foundations of economically developed nations, how they can use their wealth to benefit all classes of society and create a just world order. Central to this is his criticism of liberalism and the writings of Adam Smith. Philosophically, Müller starts from his theory of opposites - a kind of early dialectic view that revolves around the idea of mediation and balance.

Müller was a man of great and versatile talents, an excellent orator, and a suggestive writer. Several of his works were based upon his own lectures; the most important (besides the above-mentioned periodicals) are:

- Die Lehre vom Gegensatz (The Doctrine of Contrasts, Berlin, 1804)
- Vorlesungen über die deutsche Wissenschaft und Literatur (Lectures on German science and literature, Dresden, 1806, 2nd ed., 1807)
- Von der Idee der Schönheit (On the idea of beauty, lectures; Berlin, 1809)
- Die Elemente der Staatskunst (The Elements of Statecraft, lectures; 3 parts, Berlin, 1809)
- Über König Friedrich II. und die Natur, Würde und Bestimmung der preußischen Monarchie (lectures; Berlin, 1810)
- Die Theorie der Staatshaushaltung und ihre Forschritte in Deutschland und England seit Adam Smith (The theory of state budgeting, 2 vols., Vienna, 1812)
- Vermischte Schriften über Staat, Philosophie und Kunst (2 vols., Vienna, 1812; 2nd ed., 1817)
- Versuch einer neuen Theorie des Geldes, mit besonderer Rücksicht auf Großbritannien (Attempt at a new theory of money, Leipzig, 1816)
- Zwölf Reden über die Beredsamkeit und deren Verfall in Deutschland (Twelve speeches on eloquence and its decline in Germany, Leipzig, 1817)
- Die Fortschritte der nationalökonomischen Wissenschaft in England (Leipzig, 1817)
- Von der Notwendigkeit einer theologischen Grundlage der gesamten Staatswissenschaften und der Staatswirtschaft insbesondere (Of the need for a theological basis for all political science, Leipzig, 1820; new ed., Vienna, 1898)
- Die Gewerbe-Polizei in Beziehung auf den Landbau (Leipzig, 1824)
- Vorschlag zu einem historischen Ferien-Cursus (Vienna, 1829)

A critical pamphlet, which was written in 1817 on the occasion of the Protestant jubilee of the Reformation and entitled, Etwas, das Goethe gesagt hat. Beleuchtet von Adam Müller. Leipzig, den 31 Oktober 1817, was printed but not published (reprinted in Vienna, 1910). Nevertheless, Traugott Krug's reply, entitled Etwas, das Herr Adam Müller gesagt hat über etwas, das Goethe gesagt hat, und noch etwas, das Luther gesagt hat (Leipzig, 1817), appeared in two editions.

=== English traductions ===
- The Elements of Statecraft, introduction and traduction by Victor van Brandt, Perth, Australia, Imperium Press, p. 558, 2025 ISBN 978-1923478497

== Sources ==
- This work in turn cites:
  - Ernst Mischler (1885). "Müller, Adam Heinrich" . Allgemeine Deutsche Biographie (in German). Vol. 22. Leipzig: Duncker & Humblot. pp. 501–511.
