= Karl Bücher =

German economist (1847–1930)

Karl Wilhelm Bücher (16 February 1847, Kirberg, Hesse – 12 November 1930, Leipzig, Saxony) was a German economist, one of the founders of non-market economics, and the founder of journalism as an academic discipline.

== Biography ==
=== Early life ===
Karl Bücher was born in Kirberg, a small village in Hesse, as the son of a small, not very successful brushmaker and farmer; his grandfather Philipp was a cabinet-maker. Karl's mother, Christiane née Dorn, was the daughter of a baker. Bücher attended a private preparatory school with a Pastor in nearby Dauborn and 1863–1866 the Catholic Gymnasium in Hadamar, where he was primus omnium. A former teacher of Bücher's recommended he attend university and, after much discussion, Bücher's parents finally consented.

=== Later years ===
Bücher studied at the University of Bonn (also part of Prussia), concentrating on History and Classics, with the aim to become a Gymnasium teacher. Bücher's most important professor was the Ancient Historian Arnold Schäfer. For a while, he was a private tutor in Heppenheim to finance his studies, and then continued in Göttingen and Bonn, culminating in 1870 in a Dr.phil. (Ph.D.) in History and Epigraphy with a (published) dissertation entitled De gente Aetolica amphictyoniae participe. After spending some time as a gymnasium teacher and journalist, especially in Frankfurt where he was famous for his liberal, anti-Bismarck views, Bücher decided to opt for academe and took his Habilitation at the Ludwig-Maximilians-Universität München.

In 1882, Bücher was elected by the faculty to an extraordinary professorship at the University of Erlangen, Bücher failed to receive Ministerial approval. However, he also received and accepted a call to a Chair at the University of Tartu (then Dorpat), the German-language university in the then Russian province of Livonia. The call enabled him to marry his fiancée at the time Emilie Mittermaier.

At Dorpat, Bücher held the Chair of Ethnography, Geography, and Statistics as successor of Wilhelm Stieda, concentrating almost exclusively on statistics. Here, he conceived "newspaper science" (Zeitungswissenschaften) as a new field of scholarship. On 17 August (29 August new-style) 1883, Bücher's only son and child Friedrich, later a judge in Leipzig, was born. In the same year, Bücher received, and accepted out of family considerations, a call to the Chair of Economics and Statistics at the University of Basel as successor of Alphons Thun. He stayed there until 1890, during which time he developed a friendship with the historian and cultural philosopher Jakob Burckhardt. Bücher was elected President of the Statistical-Economical Association; his work was mainly Basel-focused and statistical. In Basel, he delivered the first lectures, also the first lectures in Europe at all, on "newspaper science".

From 1889 to 1890, Bücher accepts a call to the economics chair at the Technical Superior School in Karlsruhe, in the Grand Duchy of Baden, previously held by Eberhard Gothein.

The plan to call Bücher to the Chair of Economics at Leipzig University in the Kingdom of Saxony as successor of Lujo Brentano failed for political reasons; Bücher was still judged as too liberal. However, Leipzig University created a second chair in economics, with the addition of statistics. Bücher was suggested unanimously and without competition, and at the time received official approval.

His tenure at Leipzig University (1892–1916) was Bücher's most fruitful time. In 1893, he published Die Entstehung der Volkswirtschaft (The Rise of the National Economy), his most important book, and the foundational study of non-market (exchange and gift) economics. The 17th and last edition of the original run appeared in 1926–1930; it was translated into French and English and went through six editions in America. In 1895, Bücher was elected corresponding member of the Bavarian Academy of Science, Historical Class. In 1896, Arbeit und Rhythmus (Labor and Rhythm) appeared; there are six editions until 1924. It was translated into Russian in 1899 and reprinted in 1923.

In 1901, Bücher became co-editor, with Albert Schäffle, then sole editor after 1904, of the eminent Zeitschrift für die gesamte Staatswissenschaft (Magazine for All Political Sciences) established in 1844 as the first German economic journal of an academic standard and is still published today as "The Journal of Institutional and Theoretical Economics". He edited this key journal of German economics and administration until 1924. In 1901/1902 he served as Vice Chancellor of the Faculty of Philosophy, in 1902/1903 as Dean of the Faculty of Philosophy, and in 1903/04 as Rector of Leipzig University.

In 1916, based on his bad experience with press and propaganda during World War I, Bücher founded the Institut für Zeitungswissenschaften (Institute for Newspaper Science) at Leipzig University (after having established a departmental division already in 1915). It was the first institute of its type in Europe, and its founding marks the beginning of the academic study of media communication in Germany. Until 1926, Bücher headed the Institute and promoted the field, establishing it as a scholarly discipline in Germany with lasting results. In 1919, during the abortive German revolution, Bücher published a booklet about the socialization of factories as well as his highly successful autobiography, Lebenserinnerungen (Life Memories).

Bücher was, for some time a member of the Leipzig City Council. Next to his earned doctorate, he received honorary ones of Law (Dr.jur.h.c.) from the University of Giessen and of economics (Dr.rer.pol.) from the University of Bonn. He was part of the Royal Saxon Geheimer Hofrat and a member of the Royal Saxon Academy.
