= Richard T. Ely House =

Historic house in Wisconsin, United States

- U.S. National Register of Historic Places
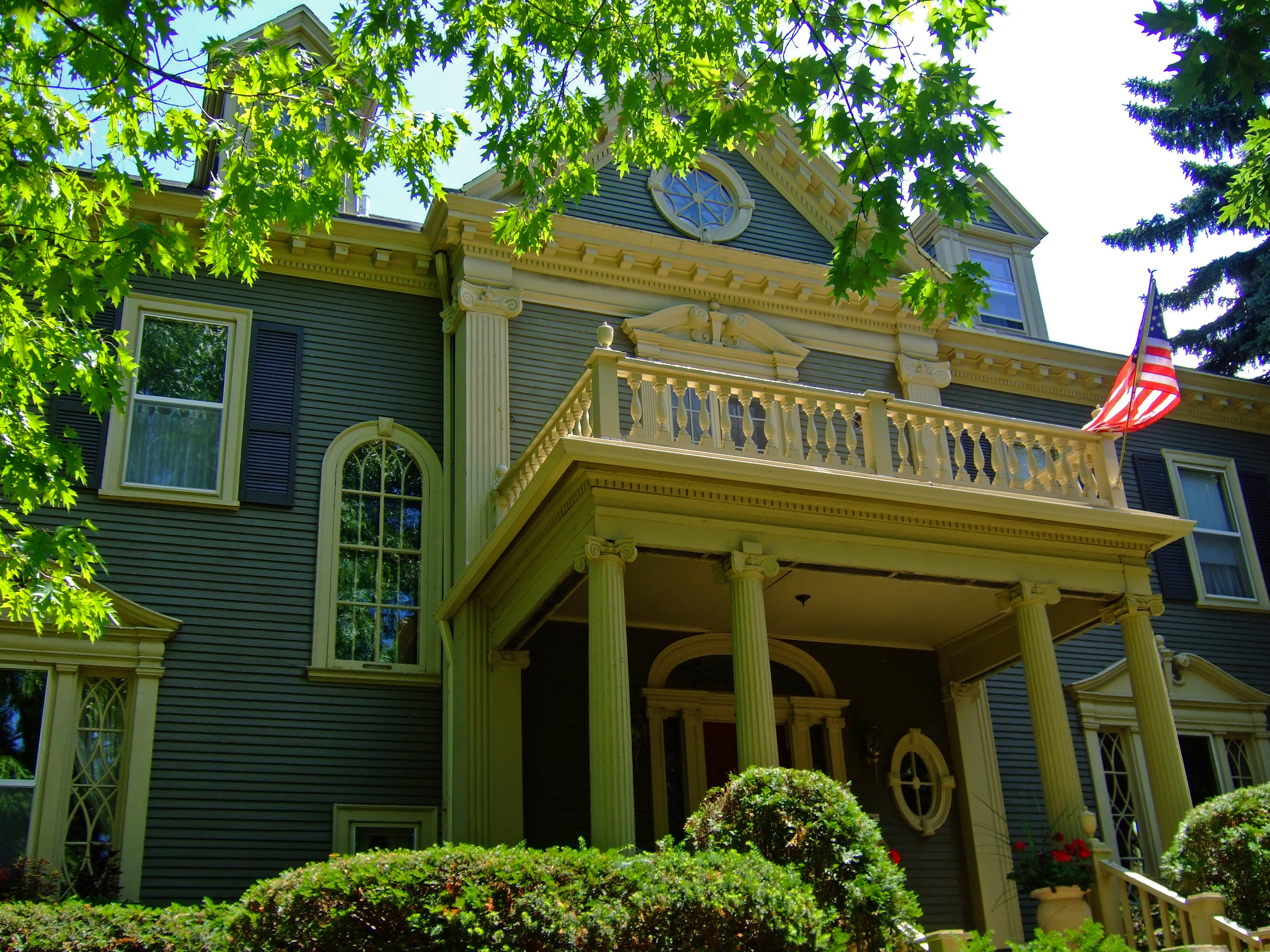

- Location within Wisconsin Location within the United States
- Location: 205 N. Prospect Ave. Madison, Wisconsin
- Coordinates: 43°04′18″N 89°24′58″W
- Built: 1896
- Architect: Charles Sumner Frost
- Architectural style: Colonial Revival/Georgian Revival
- NRHP reference No.: 74000068
- Added to NRHP: December 16, 1974

The Richard T. Ely House is a Georgian Revival-style house built in 1896 in Madison, Wisconsin - designed by Charles Sumner Frost for Richard T. Ely, a prominent economics professor. In 1974 it was added to the National Register of Historic Places. It is located within the University Heights Historic District.

== History ==
Richard Ely was one of Wisconsin's most important economics scholars. He was born in 1854 in New York and grew up on a farm there, absorbing Christian values from his devout father. He studied economics in Heidelberg University in Germany, learning a historical approach to economics that wasn't taught much in the U.S. yet. In 1881 he started teaching at the prestigious Johns Hopkins University in Baltimore. During this time he married Anna Morris Anderson and they started a family.

Up to this point, the classical approach to economics had dominated in the U.S. - the idea that free markets and laissez-faire treatment by government were the best way to promote economic growth. But along with economic growth, these ideas had led to evils like child labor. Ely was one of the early proponents in the U.S. of a new economics whose goal was not only growth, but also making people's lives better. He was a founder of the American Economic Association, and advocated public ownership of utilities, factory regulation, child labor laws, shorter workdays, labor unions, and restrictions on immigration. Many of these ideas lined up with Progressive reforms from that era.

In 1892 the University of Wisconsin lured Ely from Johns Hopkins to direct its new School of Economics, Political Science, and History. That winter Madison saw labor strikes resulting from attempts to organize unions at two Madison printers. Ely was then a leader of the Christian Social Union, which aimed to apply Christian principles to address social problems. The CSU had a printing job pending at the Tracy-Gibbs Printing Company, the second company to strike, and Ely happened to be in charge of that printing job. He urged the company owner to unionize several times, and hinted that if the company didn't unionize, the CSU might take their business elsewhere. The printer didn't unionize, and the CSU let the job go forward with Tracy-Gibbs. But the following year Wisconsin's Superintendent of Public Instruction Oliver Elwin Wells accused Ely of "believ[ing] in strikes and boycotts," and of being in "constant consultation" with the union organizer, and of asserting that "where a skilled workman was needed, a dirty, dissipated, unmarried, unreliable, and unskilled man should be employed in preference to an industrious, skillful, trustworthy, non-union man who is the head of family." Wells also condemned Ely's writings: "Only the careful student will discover their utopian, impracticable, and pernicious doctrines...." Wells got his accusations printed in national papers and the Regents had to investigate. A trial before the Board of Regents ensued, but Wells couldn't substantiate his more damning claims. In the end, the Regents exonerated Ely, but beyond that they supported academic freedom in the statement from which "sifting and winnowing" comes:

...we could not for a moment think of recommending the dismissal or even the criticism of a teacher even if some of his opinions should, in some quarters, be regarded as visionary. Such a course would be equivalent to saying that no professor should teach anything which is not accepted by everybody as true. ... In all lines of academic investigation it is of the utmost importance that the investigator should be absolutely free to follow the indications of truth wherever they may lead. Whatever may be the limitations which trammel inquiry elsewhere, we believe the great state University of Wisconsin should ever encourage that continual and fearless sifting and winnowing by which alone the truth can be found.

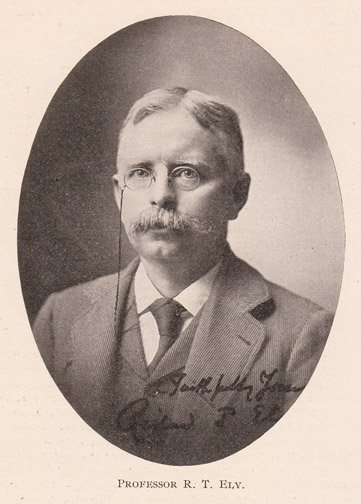
Ely in 1903

The Elys had their grand house built a couple years later, in 1896. They commissioned a design by Chicago architect Charles Sumner Frost, who had designed the Old Law Building on Bascom Hill a few years before. Frost designed a textbook Georgian Revival-style house, with a nearly symmetric façade, a hip-and-deck roof, and eaves decorated like a cornice with modillions. The front entrance is surrounded by sidelights and fanlight beneath a portico supported by Ionic columns. A rail surrounds the top of the portico, with a window topped with a broken pediment behind and flanked by pilasters. Atop all this is a centered pediment with a circular window. The first floor windows on the front are also elaborate, topped with broken pediments.

In 1906 Ely helped organize the American Association for Labor Legislation, the American Association for Agriculture Legislation in 1917, and the Institute for Research in Land Economics and Public Utilities in 1920. With Ely's progressive ideals, he was a supporter of Governor Robert M. La Follette, but split with him when La Follette opposed U.S. involvement in World War I. Anna died in 1923. In 1925 Ely left the UW and the house in Madison, taking a position at Northwestern University.

In 1974 Ely's house in Madison was added to the NRHP because it may be the city's best example of a Georgian Revival home, and for the house's association with the important economist. The house was designated a landmark by the Madison Landmarks Commission the same year.
