= Leiserson =

Leiserson is a surname. Notable people with the surname include:

- Charles E. Leiserson (born 1953), computer scientist
- William Morris Leiserson (1883–1957), labor relations scholar and mediator
