= Oliver Wells =

Oliver Wells may refer to:

- Oliver Wells (Bones), a character on the TV series Bones
- Oliver Elwin Wells (1853–1922), American educator
