= The John R. and Nell Commons House =

Historic house in Wisconsin, United States

- John R. and Nell Commons House
- U.S. National Register of Historic Places
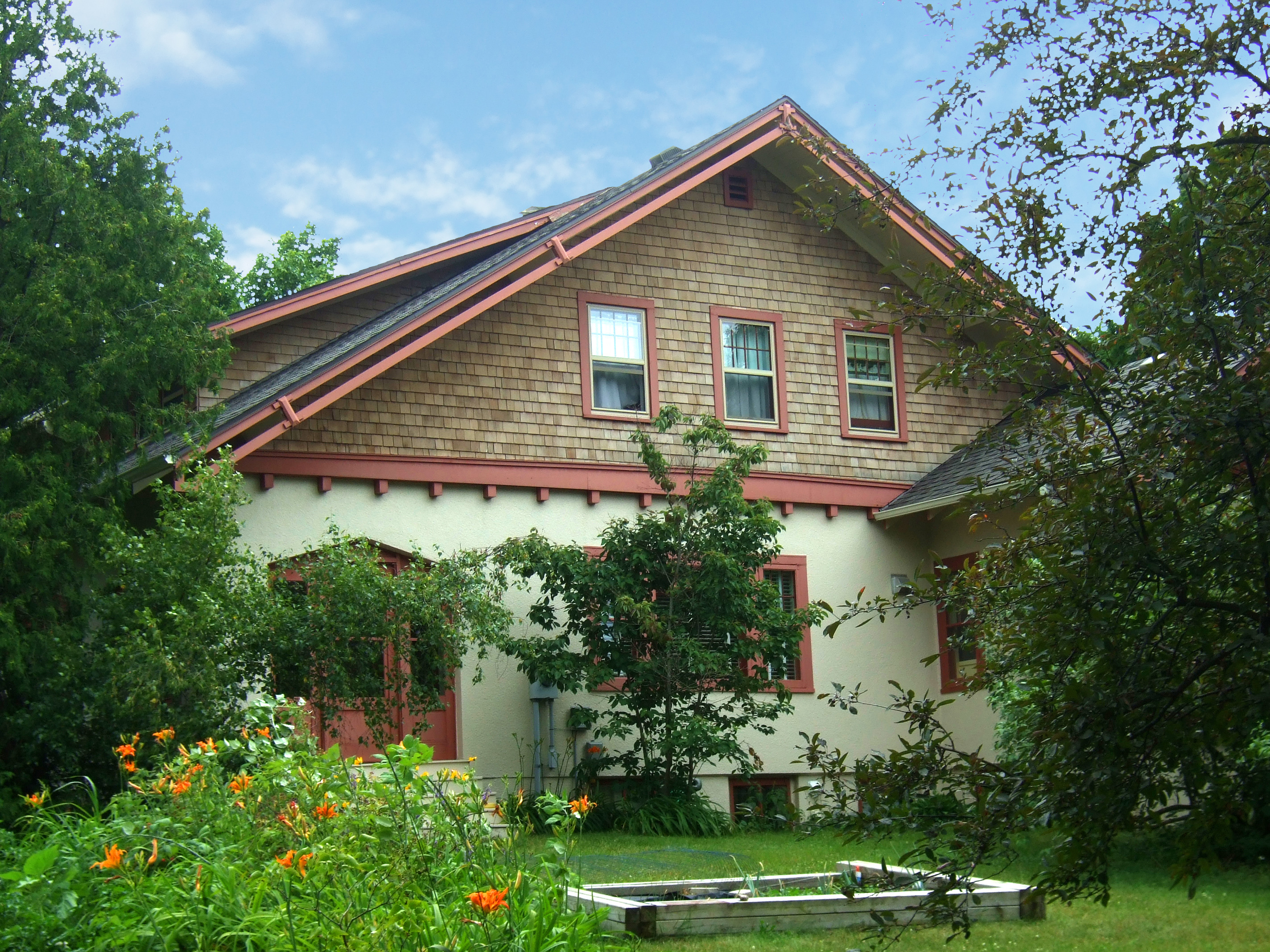

- Location within Wisconsin Location within the United States
- Location: 1645 Norman Way; Madison, Wisconsin
- Coordinates: 43°4′56″N 89°28′45″W
- Area: 0.69 acres (0.28 ha)
- Built: 1913
- Architect: Cora Tuttle
- Architectural style: Bungalow/Craftsman, Prairie School
- NRHP reference No.: 85000572
- Added to NRHP: March 14, 1985

The John and Nell Commons House is a large hilltop bungalow built in 1913 in Madison, Wisconsin, from which UW professor John R. Commons wrote influential books on economics, helped craft Progressive public policy, and mentored a generation of economists. The house itself was designed by Cora Tuttle - not a formally trained architect, but the first woman to practice architecture in Madison. In 1985 the house was added to the National Register of Historic Places.

== History ==
John R. Commons was born in 1863 in Hollansburg, Ohio. Richard T. Ely brought him to the UW in 1904 to teach and to edit the 11-volume Documentary History of American Industrial Society. "He was among the first economists to move away from the traditional laissez-faire economic thinking; and he pioneered in the progressive era concept that government should assume a positive role in furthering the cause of reform..."

This was the era of Progressive social legislation, in which Wisconsin under Governor LaFollette was a leader. John Commons contributed to that legislation, helping draft the 1905 Wisconsin Civil Service Law, which specified uniform civil service exams; the 1907 Public Utilities Law; the 1911 Industrial Commission Law which effected changes in worker safety, child labor, minimum wages, and labor disputes; and the 1924 Unemployment Insurance Plan for the Chicago clothing market. During the Great Depression, Common's grad students helped plan and administer New Deal legislation like the Social Security Act. Commons is one of several people credited with originating the "Wisconsin Idea," in which university faculty serve as advisors to state government. At one point a representative of business called Dr. Commons "the most dangerous man in Wisconsin," but Commons himself later observed, "Yet what I was always trying to do in my academic way, was to save Wisconsin and the nation from politics, socialism, or anarchism, in dealing with the momentous conflict of 'capital and labor.'"

In 1909 and 1910 John and his wife Ella bought about seven acres of farmland on a hilltop west of Madison. They had Cora Tuttle design a large bungalow for the hilltop.

The designer Cora Tuttle had been born in 1864 in Evansville, Wisconsin. Widowed in 1906, she moved with her sons to Prescott, Arizona. There in the southwest she was exposed to the bungalow, a then-modern and convenient style of house that had developed in California. The bungalow didn't reach Madison until Cora and her family returned with the idea in 1908. Cora had not formally studied architecture, but she had absorbed the ideas, and she designed a bungalow for her family, with help from her son Ray, then an engineering student at the UW. Their house was built in 1909, and still stands at 1206 Grant Street. She went on to design other bungalows around Madison. Though unlicensed and not formally trained in architecture, Cora Tuttle is the first woman known to practice architectural design in Wisconsin.

The house is two stories tall, wood-framed, clad in stucco on the first story and wood shingles on the second. The roof is low-pitched, with exposed rafter tails showing Craftsman influence. Vergeboards decorate the gable ends and the ends of the joists that support the second story floor protrude from the wall as decoration. A balcony opens from the second-story bedroom on the southeast end. A porch spans the northeast side, with the wall on that side pierced by pentagonal window openings. Inside, the first story contains the living-dining room, the kitchen, two hallways, a coatroom, and the study where John wrote, with oak shelves and brick fireplace. The second story contains four bedrooms, two linen closets, and a full bathroom. The couple named the house Hocheera, the Ho-Chunk word for 'welcome.'

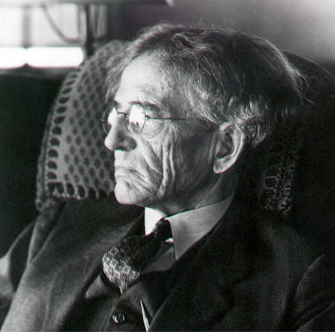

Professor Commons mentored many talented economics graduate students, including labor historian Selig Perlman, Edwin E. Witte who is sometimes called "the father of U.S. Social Security," Arthur J. Altmeyer, Paul Raushenbush, Elizabeth Brandeis Raushenbush, and Wayne Morse. John and his wife Ella invited students out to the house on Friday nights for meetings that Selig Perlman described:

There are hundreds of Commons' students, including some most prominent in the academic life and in the public services of this country, who largely owe their careers to the untiring and tender encouragement by Professor and Mrs. Commons. At the Commons' weekly 'Friday Nights' at their home on Mendota Beach, students, frequently numbering as many as sixty, had the opportunity of meeting some of the most prominent economists and public men of the world and to present before the group their own observation in the 'field'. To the Commons' Friday Nights many a public man looks back today as the informal and friendly 'Parliament' that heard his 'maiden speech'.

Commons was considered by some the brain trust of Wisconsin's progressive movement, but he worked with other prominent men beyond Wisconsin, "including Samuel Gompers of the American Federation of Labor; John A. Mitchell of the Mine Workers; Ralph Easley of the National Civic Federation; Eugene V. Debs, Social Democratic candidate for U.S. president; Victor Berger, founder of the Social Democratic Party; Charles R. Crane, millionaire ambassador to China; and Henry Ford, Thomas Edison and President Wilson."

John Commons lived and worked in this house until 1937, when he moved to Florida. Subsequent owners have included Frederick and Margret Burkhardt, John and Martha Lippitt, and now Richard and Doris Dubielzig. The original seven acres has been parceled out into lots so that Hocheera now stands in a residential neighborhood. The home was designated a Madison Landmark in 1984 and was added to the NRHP in 1985, mainly for its association with the nationally prominent economist.
