= Henry Rogers Seager =

American economist (1870–1930)

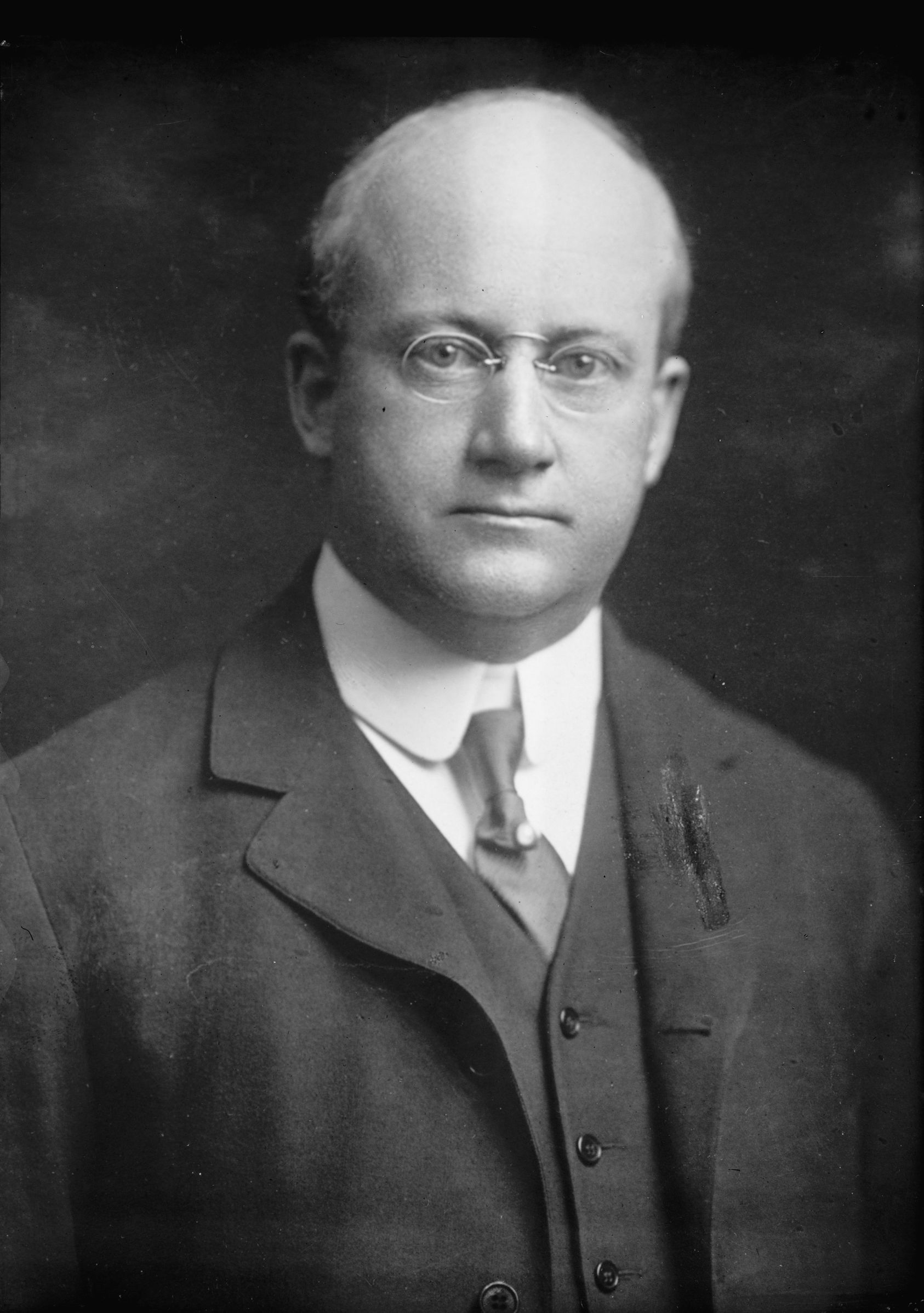
- Henry Rogers Seager, 1915.
- Born: July 21, 1870; Lansing, Michigan
- Died: August 23, 1930 (aged 60); Kiev, Soviet Union

Academic background
- Education: University of Michigan
- Doctoral advisor: Simon Patten

Academic work
- Discipline: Political Economy, and economic organization
- Institutions: Columbia University
- Doctoral students: Horace Bookwalter Drury, Mary van Kleeck
- Notable ideas: "Principles of Economics" in 1913.

Henry Rogers Seager (July 21, 1870 – August 23, 1930, in Kiev, Soviet Union) was an American economist, and Professor of Political Economy at Columbia University, who served as president of the American Association for Labor Legislation.

Inspired by the work of the Austrian School, Seager published his main work "Principles of Economics" in 1913. Inline with the institutional economics this textbook was typical "empirical and institutional in applied work, that dealt with real markets." In 1929 he published his most cited work, entitled "Trust and corporation problems."

== Biography ==
Seager was born to Schuyler Fiske Seager and Alice (Berry) Seager in Lansing, Michigan, where his father worked as a lawyer. He studied at the University of Michigan, where he obtained his P.h.B. in 1890. He continued his studies at Johns Hopkins University under Herbert Baxter Adams and Richard T. Ely for a year, in Europe at Halle, Berlin, and Vienna for two years, obtaining his PhD back in the US from the University of Pennsylvania in 1894 under Simon Patten.

In 1894 Seager started his academic career as an instructor in economics at the Wharton School of the University of Pennsylvania, and was promoted to assistant professor in 1896. In 1902 he moved to Columbia University, serving as adjunct professor until 1905 when he was appointed professor of political economy.

Seager was a member of several commissions in New York to investigate labor conditions. He served as president of the American Association for Labor Legislation, which he had co-founded in 1906 with other economists, and served on the board of editors of the Political Science Quarterly.

== Death ==
He died in 1930 in Kiev, USSR when he was visiting to study Soviet economic philosophy.

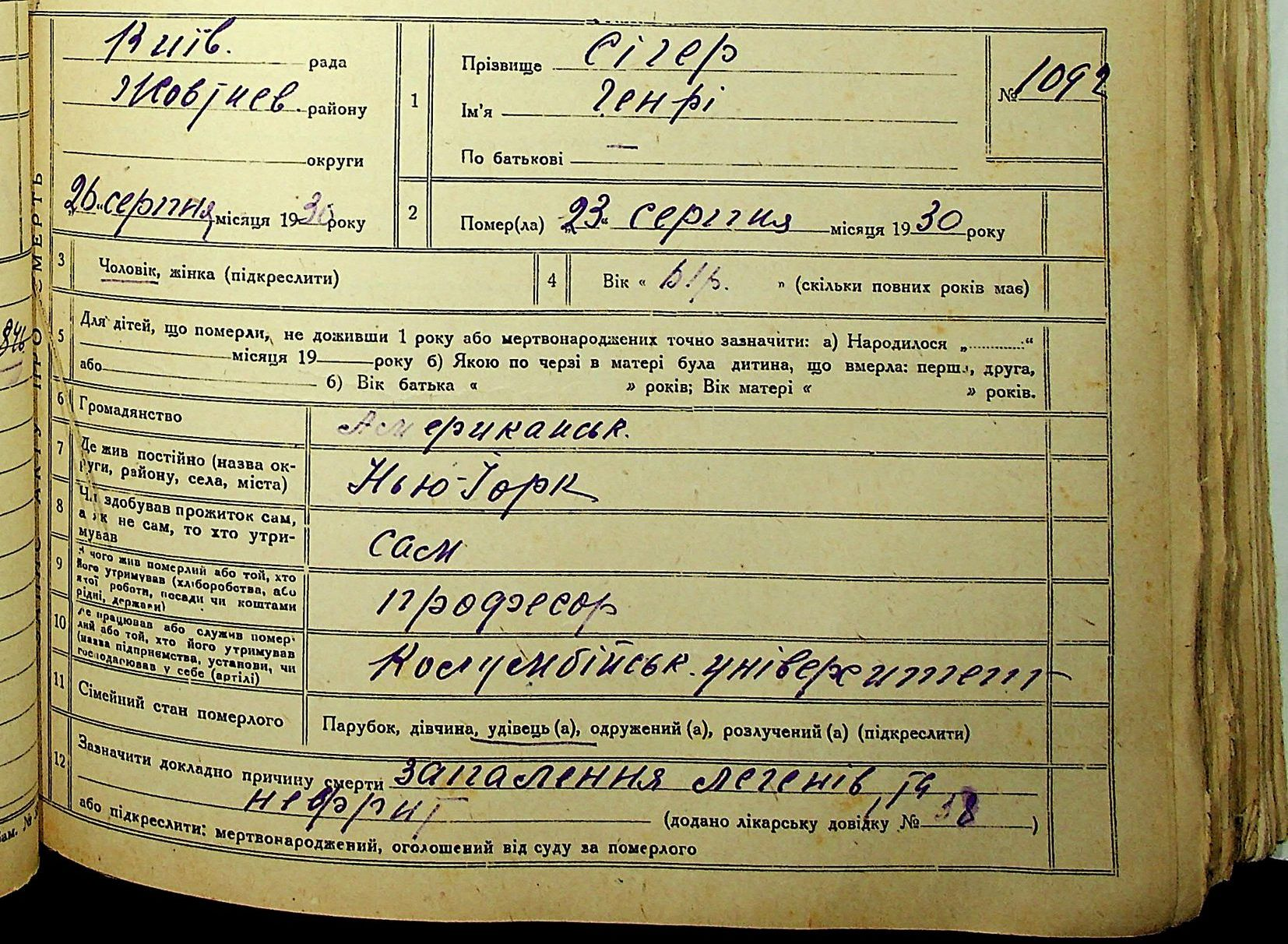
Death Certificate of Henry Rogers Seager

== Work ==
Seager's work as economist was influenced by his training in "English classicism, in the German historical method and in the peculiar Austrian approach" of the Austrian School. In 1904 he published "Introduction to Economics" in 1904, which he later developed into his main work "Principles of Economics," published in 1913.

=== Introduction to Economics, 1904 ===
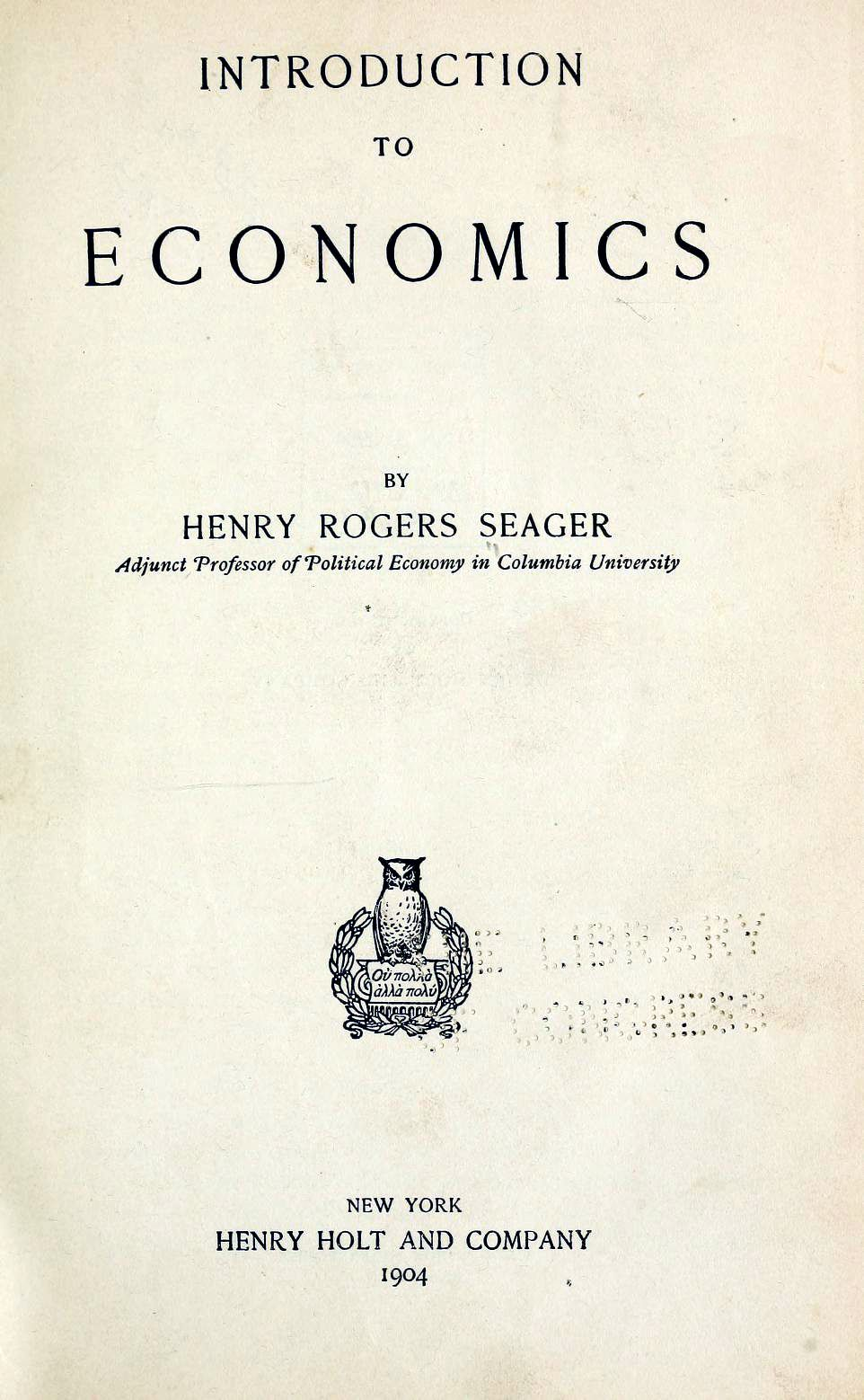
Introduction to economics, 1904.

In the preface to Introduction to Economics, Seager explains, that "the principal feature which distinguishes it from other college text-books is its full treatment of the subject of distribution. This is the part of the study which is of greatest interest and importance; yet it is the part most neglected in current manuals..."

In a review of this work the American economist Herbert J. Davenport (1904) commented:

"In almost all respects this new manual is all that a book of the sort ought to be—— thoroughly modern in doctrine : wide in sympathy; marvelously deft in avoiding offense and in touching lightly on contested points, yet in all cases calling both instructor and pupil to face fairly the point in question; clear, sprightly, and stimulating in style and in manner of presentation. And all the while there is room for the instructor and for his initiative and individuality. No teacher inferior in training or wanting in class-room skill would better attempt this book...
His catholic quality of temper and lack of dogmatism render. Professor Seager's doctrinal positions of less controlling importance for text-book purposes. While his work is noticebly Austrian in tone and method, yet it is such in a manner which need not offend even the radically conservative. Merely as indicating a general point of view, it may be noted that the marginal-productivity theory of distribution is adopted, with perhaps some degree of vagueness or vacillation as to the relation between distributive shares and competitive costs..."

==== Modern production and distribution ====
Seager (1904) expressed a specific view on the production and distribution in modern community. Modern business can be divided into twelve branches or principal businesses, as he expressed:

"Looking at modern business in a concrete way we may distinguish the following main branches into which production is divided : (1) hunting and fishing, (2) stock-raising, (3) farming, (4) forestry (t. e., logging, lumbering, etc.), (5) mining and quarrying, (6) manufacturing, (7) building, (8) transporting, (9) wholesale and retail trading, (10) produce and stock broking, (11) banking, and (12) insurance. Although by no means exhaustive this list includes the principal businesses to be found in a modern community arranged in about the order in which they have attained prominence..."

According to Seager, the best adapted form of business organisation is different. In hunting, stock-raising, farming, building, broking, and trading the dominant form is the single-entrepreneur and partnership systems. In lumbering, mining, and manufacturing single entrepreneurs, partnerships, and corporations exist side by side, and in transportation, banking, and insurance the "corporate form of organisation holds undisputed sway. In general the corporate form of organisation is that preferred in branches of business where large-scale production is found to be most economical, while in businesses for which small-scale production is better adapted single entrepreneurs and partnerships still have the advantage."

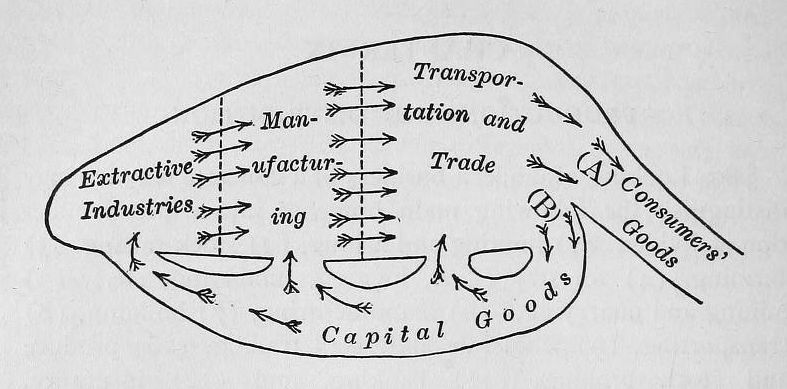
Economic production and distribution, 1904

According to Seager, production and distribution in the modern community can be analysed, and graphically pictured, by distinguishing three more basic branches of production:

1. the extractive industries, which supply materials,
2. the manufacturing industries, which combine and fashion materials into the forms desired by consumers, and
3. transportation and trade, which bring manufactured goods to those who are to use them.

About the basic interaction, Seager further explained:

"As represented in the above figure the three great branches of production are being carried on simultaneously and the goods produced are flowing in a vast stream from the extractive industries, where they originate as materials, to traders who dispose of them in finished forms either to consumers or to producers who use them as capital goods or aids to further production. Although working contemporaneously, successive groups of producers are, of course, engaged on materials previously produced by those employed at the preceding stages. Manufacturers are manufacturing materials turned out somewhat earlier by the extractive industries and transporters and traders are handling goods previously manufactured. The iron ore and the coal that are being mined to-day will come together in blast furnaces and steel mills some weeks or months hence; the resulting steel will be fashioned into axes, ploughs, building frames, etc., some weeks or months after it has been reduced to ingots or rolled into bars; these steel products will contribute to the satisfaction of the wants of consumers at a still later period. The average time taken, as production is now organised in the United States, to convert raw material into consumable commodities cannot be accurately measured, but it is certain that it runs into months and probable that it exceeds a year. The vast majority who are at work on any given day help to produce materials or unfinished commodities."

==== Value, Price, and Distribution ====
In the chapter about "Value, Price, and Distribution" Seager explains, that his model of the modern production and distribution can be used to "restate the laws determining rent, wages, and interest." He stated:

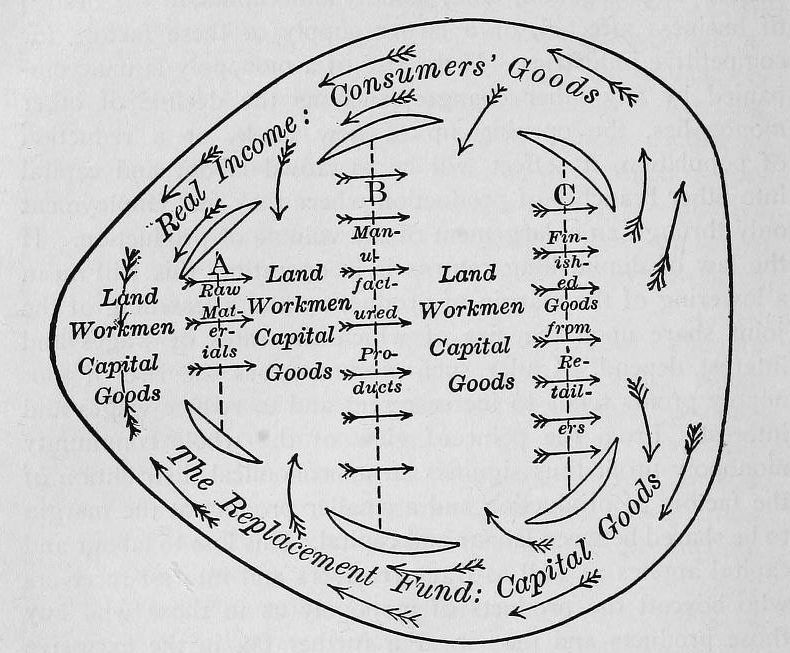
Economic value, price and distribution, 1904

"It will be necessary to advert for the last time the relations that would prevail in an industrial society brought Production to the state of normal equilibrium. In such a society the relation between production, distribution, and consumption would be extremely simple. Production would still be carried on as a serial process, but it could be readily analysed, since all prices would correspond exactly to the expenses of production and these would never vary. The whole matter may be represented graphically by the accompanying figure.
In the figure production is represented as subdivided into three great stages, A, B, and C. The extractive industries: (A) turn out raw materials. Manufacturing (B) takes these and transforms them into manufactured products. Transportation and trade (C) deliver the latter as finished products to purchasers, who may be either consumers converting their money incomes into real incomes, or entrepreneurs converting the free replacement fund into capital goods to restore the wastes incidental to production. The figure represents movement without change."

And furthermore:

"Goods are flowing continuously from stage A to B and from stage B to C. At C the stream is divided, an unvarying volume of capital goods flowing one way and an unvarying stream of consumers' goods flowing the other. The capital goods exactly replace the goods destroyed in the course of production and the consumers' goods exactly remunerate the owners of land, workmen, and owners of capital goods for the productive services which they or their possessions have rendered. Finally the prices of goods are invariable and everywhere just equal to their unvarying expenses of production."

Later in the 20th century the model of the circular flow of income has been developed, which comprehends similar concepts.

==== Principles of economics ====
In his 1913 Principles of economics Seager further extended his theory of production and distribution. Seager explained:

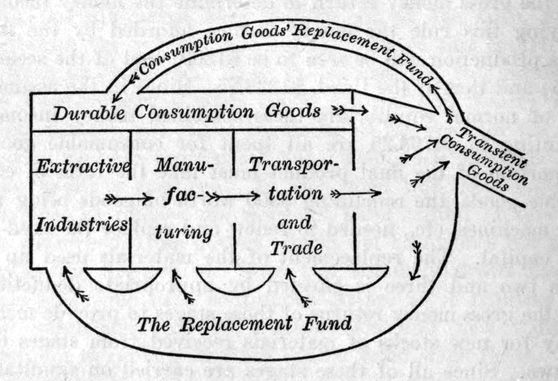
Capitalistic production in a self-contained industrial society, 1911

"Since the relations we are trying to picture are between flows of goods rather than fixed funds of goods, certain of their aspects may be more easily presented in graphic than in arithmetical form. The [accompanying] figure... represents capitalistic production in a self-contained industrial society brought to a state of normal equilibrium. In it are represented in successive and connected compartments the three great branches of production: the extractive industries, manufacturing, and transportation and trade..."

About the flows in the model, he explains:

"...Raw materials, the products of the extractive industries, flow through from left to right, being enriched as they pass along by the addition of form, place, time and possession utilities. On leaving the hands of dealers, they are separated into two great streams, one, the replacement fund, which flows back to repair and renew capital goods worn or destroyed in the process of production, the other, consumption goods, which begin immediately to gratify wants. The consumption goods stream is again subdivided, one branch conveying the second and subordinate replacement fund needed to repair and renew the durable consumption goods whose presence is indicated at the top of the diagram and which give off a continuous stream of utilities to mingle with those afforded by transient consumption goods, the other and larger branch into which the main consumption goods stream is divided."

And furthermore:

"The net product represented in this diagram consists in part of raw materials, in part of manufactured goods, finished and unfinished, and in part of the utilities subsequently added at the stage 'transportation and trade.' Only a very limited part is sufficiently advanced to be flowing out with the stream of consumption goods to minister directly to human wants. On the other hand it is from this stream of consumption goods that the entire real income for which the money income is exchanged is drawn. Although the identical goods constituting the real income are thus for the most part other than the goods constituting the net product, the latter consists of exactly similar utilities quantitatively and qualitatively as the former. At each point the streams of goods flow on evenly and unbrokenly so that the " transient consumption goods " that are allowed to escape, and which constitute the real income, are exactly replaced by the goods included in the net product. The diagram thus represents movement without change. It depicts the circulation of goods that is going on in actual industrial society with the elements of change and monopoly eliminated."

In "The economics of retailing" Paul Nystrom (1915) further focussed in the 'transportation and trade' stage, and assigned various patterns in the channels of distribution.

=== Labor Legislation, 1907–1931 ===
Seager's first major contributions in the field of law, labor, and labor legislation occurred in 1907. Seager was convinced that ideas about social legislation in the United States were far behind those of the more progressive countries of Europe. In a meeting of the American Association for Labor Legislation, December 30, 1907, Seager presented a program of social legislation:

"The ends to be aimed at in any programme of social legislation are:
I. To protect wage-earners in the continued enjoyment of standards of living to which they are already accustomed.
II. To assist them to attain to higher standards of living.

The principal contingencies which threaten standards of living already acquired are: (1) industrial accidents; (2) ill ness; (3) invalidity and old age; (4) premature death; (5) unemployment. These contingencies are not in practice adequately provided against by wage-earners themselves. consequence the losses they entail, in the absence of any social provision against them, fall with crushing force on the families which suffer from them, and only too often reduce such families from a position of independence and self-respect to one of humiliating and efficiency-destroying social dependency. The following remedies for the evils resulting from this situation are suggested."

=== Social Insurance: A Program of Social Reform, 1910 ===
In 1910 Seager published Social Insurance: A Program of Social Reform, one of the first American books on the subject of social insurance. Seager was influenced by his sociology professor in Chicago Charles Richmond Henderson, who had outlined a corporatist and restrictionist ideology. Seagers book provided a rationale for social insurance, which had its origins in Europe, and influenced the establishment of Social Security in the United States.

The social security website (2014) summarized this was as "both a classic and an early exposition of the philosophical movement for social insurance in America. The philosophy expressed by Seager would be the same general viewpoint favored by many of the founders of Social Security in America. Seager's books expresses the thinking of Americans toward this new idea of social insurance which had in origins in Europe at the end of the 19th century.

=== Theory of the Minimum Wage, 1913 ===
In his 1913 article on the "Theory of the Minimum Wage." explains the main contemporary problems around the introduction of minimum wages. Seager started:

"From the point of view of economic theory, the proposal that minimum, or living rates of wages be prescribed by law involves two problems. First, how does it happen that for certain classes of workers in certain employments the wages paid fall below a living level. Second, what results may be expected to follow the enforcement of the requirement that no employer shall in future be permitted to pay less to any employee than the living wages pre- scribed. After considering these theoretical problems."

=== Trust and corporation problems, 1929 ===
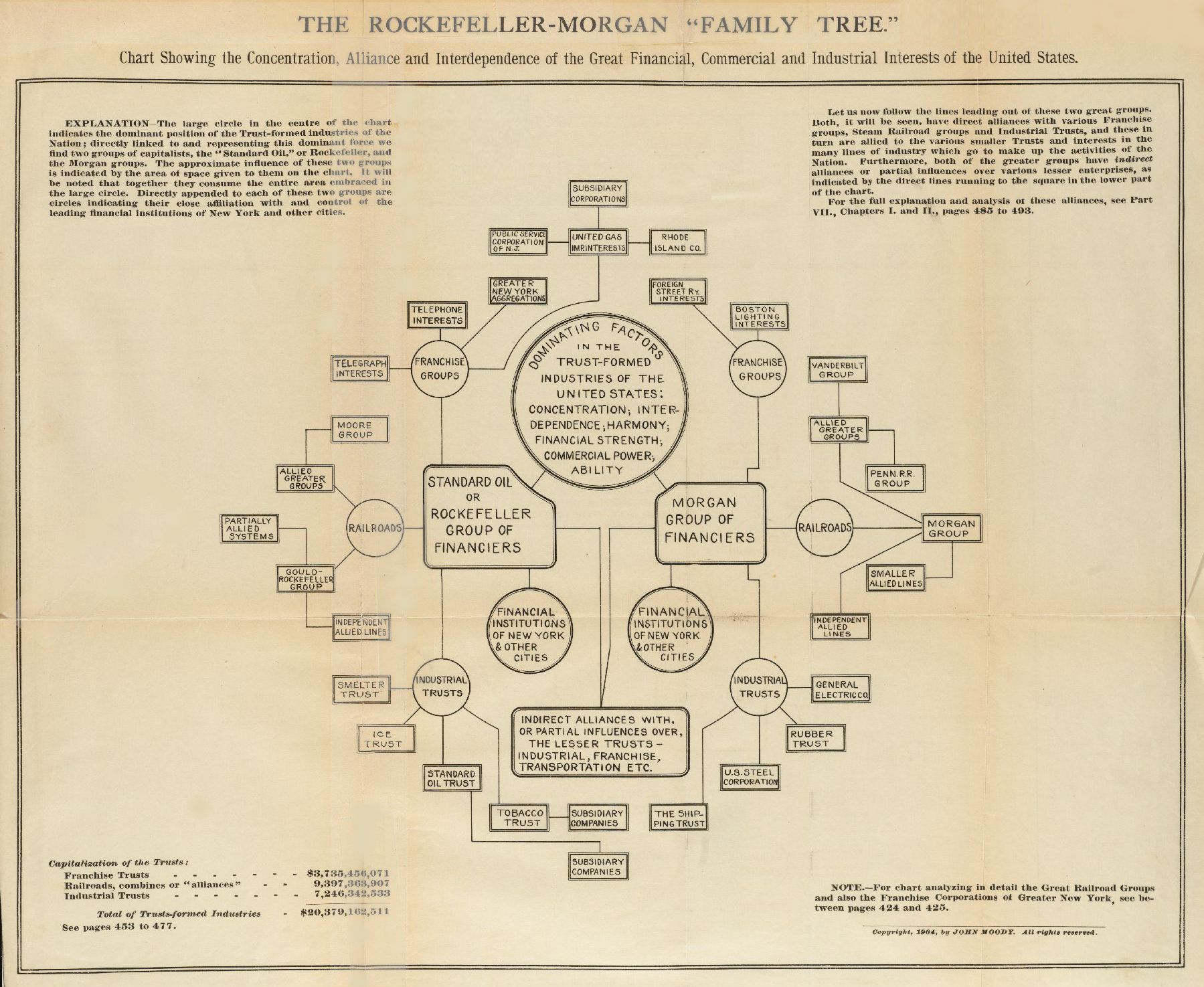
The Rockefeller-Morgan Family Tree (1904), the first great U.S. business trust.

Weidenhammer and Krebs (1930) commented, that this "book is mainly concerned with the trust problem. For two reasons, however, the authors thought it advisable to include a chapter on corporations: First most trusts are corporations, and the modern holding company and merger movements depend upon the existence of the economic institution 'corporation', and second, the regulation of trusts must to a certain extent proceed through regulation of corporate practices (stockwatering in order to hide profits, publicity of financial statements, etc.)."

Tobriner (1931) summarized, that "the modern trust problem, with its nation-wide mergers, its powerful trade association, its international price and output agreements, is today demanding and getting fresh attention. Informed opinion is coming in recognize, that former legislation which sweepingly condemned 'every combination in restraint of trade' has broken down. An attempt is being made to re-define the issue and to meet them with less prejudice and with more concern for business needs."

=== Labor and Other Economic Essays, 1931 ===
The posthumous publication of "Labor and Other Economic Essays" is considered one of Seager's most important works, beside "introduction to economics" (1913) and "Trust and corporation problems," (1929). It contained a full bibliography of Seagers publications. Seager had published his first mayor essays on law and labour late 1907. Ernst (1995) summarized:

"like other historicist economists, Seager urged that trusts and labor unions be accepted as natural and potentially beneficial developments. They should not be abolished even if they could be, he argued, but they should be regulated to ensure they did not abuse their power. Based largely on his reading of Great Upheaval labor cases, Seager concluded that the courts could not be trusted with the job of policing industrial combinations, because the legal mind was too preoccupied with precedents and traditions to give sufficient regard to the social consequences of industrial combination."

== Selected publications ==
- Seager, Henry R. Introduction to Economics. New York, H. Holt and Company, 1904.
- Seager, Henry R. Economics a lecture delivered at Columbia university in the series on science, philosophy and art, New York : The Columbia university press, 1909.
- Seager, Henry R. Economics, Briefer Course (1909)
- Seager, Henry R. Social Insurance: A Program of Social Reform, New York, The Macmillan Company, 1910.
- Seager, Henry R. Principles of Economics, New York, H. Holt and company, 1913.
- James, E. J., Falkner, R. P., Seager, H. R., Johnson, E. R., King, C. L., & Sellin, T. (1921). Annals of the American Academy of Political and Social Science (Vol. 97)Sellin, Thorsten; King, Clyde L.; Johnson, Emory R.; Seager, Henry R.; Falkner, Roland Post; James, Edmund J. "Related Names". The Annals of American Academy of Political and Social Science. HathiTrust: v.
- Seager, Henry Rogers, and Charles Adams Gulick. Trust and corporation problems. New York: Harper, 1929; Arno Press, 1973.
- Seager, Henry Rogers. Labor and Other Economic Essays. Harper & brothers, 1931.

Articles, a selection:

- Seager, Henry Rogers. "Economics at Berlin and Vienna." The Journal of Political Economy 1.2 (1893): 236–262.
- Seager, Henry Rogers. "Theory of the Minimum Wage." Am. Lab. Legis. Rev. 3 (1913): 81–91.
- Henry R. Seager, "Railroad Labor and the Labor Problem," Proceedings of the Academy of Political Science in the City of New York, vol. 10, no. 1 (July 1922), pp. 15–18. In JSTOR.
