= Principles of Labor Legislation =

US Labor law textbook

Principles of Labor Legislation (1916) was a foundational US labor law text, written in the United States by John R. Commons and John Bertram Andrews.

== Contents ==
- Chapter I: THE BASIS OF LABOR LAW i
  - 1. The Labor Contract i
  - 2. Individual Rights 5
  - 3. Due Process of Law 9
- Chapter II: INDIVIDUAL BARGAINING 35
  - 1. The Laborer as Debtor 35
  - 2. The Laborer as Creditor 50
  - 3. The Laborer as Tenant 61
  - 4. The Laborer as Competitor 68
  - 5. Legal Aid and Industrial Courts 80
- Chapter III: COLLECTIVE BARGAINING 91
  - 1. The Law of Conspiracy 91
  - 2. Mediation by Government 124
  - 3. Coercion by Government 139
  - 4. Unions of Government Employees 160
- Chapter IV: THE MINIMUM WAGE 167
  - 1. Economic Basis 168
  - 2. Historical Development 171
  - 3. Standards 179
  - 4. Methods of Operation 185
  - 5. Results 190
  - 6. Constitutionality 196
- Chapter V: HOURS OF LABOR 200
  - I. Maximum Daily Hours 204
  - 2. Rest Periods 246
- Chapter VI: UNEMPLOYMENT 261
  - 1. Regulation of Private Employment Offices .... 264
  - 2. Public Employment Exchanges 270
  - 3. Systematic Distribution of Public Work 283
  - 4. Regularization of Industry 290
- Chapter VII: SAFETY AND HEALTH 295
  - 1. Reporting 297
  - 2. Prohibition 304
  - 3. Regulation 327
- Chapter VIII: SOCIAL INSURANCE 354
  - 1. Industrial Accident Insurance 356
  - 2. Health Insurance 385
  - 3. Old Age and Invalidity Insurance 397
  - 4. Widows' and Orphans' Insurance 406
  - 5. Unemployment Insurance 409
- Chapter IX: ADMINISTRATION 415
  - 1. The Executive 416
  - 2. The Legislature 419
  - 3. The Judiciary 422
  - 4. The Industrial Commission 430
  - 5. Penalties and Prosecutions 454
  - 6. Cooperation by Pressure 462
- Select Critical Bibliography 465
- Table of Cases Cited 489
- Index 497

== See also ==
- US labor law
- UK labour law
- Sidney Webb and Beatrice Webb, Industrial Democracy (1890)
