= William Morris Leiserson =

American economist

William M. Leiserson
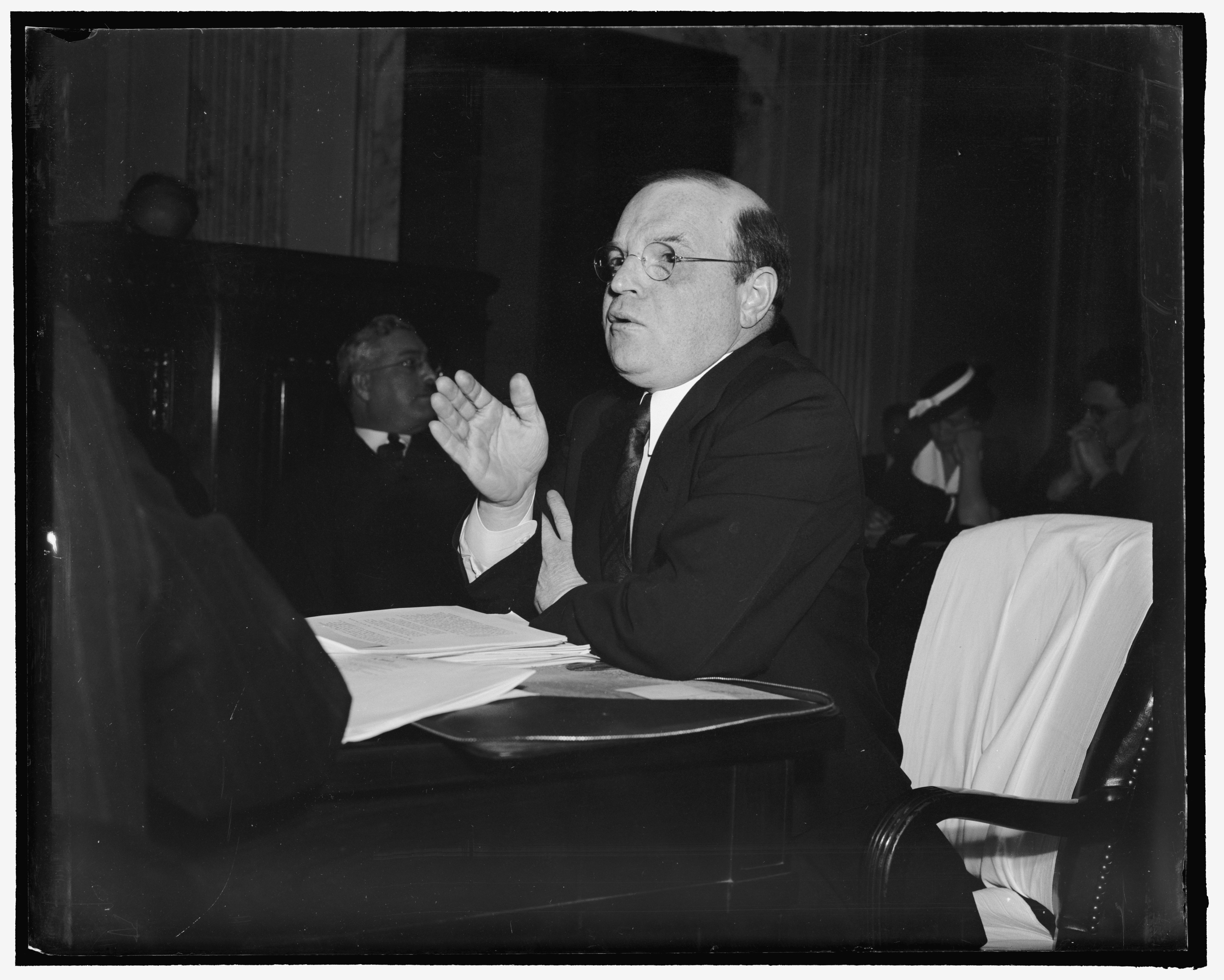
- Born: 1883; Reval, Russian Empire
- Died: 1957 (aged 73–74)

Academic background
- Education: Columbia University
- Doctoral advisor: Henry Rogers Seager

Academic work
- Discipline: Labor economics

William Morris Leiserson (1883–1957) was a labor relations scholar and mediator.

Leiserson was a professor, state and federal government administrator, mediator, arbitrator, and member of President Franklin D. Roosevelt's "brain trust," which developed and wrote legislation such as the Railway Labor Act of 1934.

== Biography ==
Born in 1883, in Reval, Russia (modern-day Estonia) William Morris Leiserson emigrated to the United States at the age of seven with his mother and two brothers. As a student at the University of Wisconsin, he studied under Professor John R. Commons, whose life and work inspired Leiserson to pursue the fields of economics and labour relations. After graduation, he continued at Columbia University where he earned his Ph.D. under Henry Rogers Seager in 1911.

Leiserson then began a career as a research scholar, professor, and public administrator. Following his graduate studies, he returned to Wisconsin, where he led the establishment the State Employment Service. Returning to academia, he held professorships at the University of Toledo and Antioch College. His U.S. government service included being Chief of the Labor Administration Division of the United States Department of Labor, Secretary of the National Labor Board of the National Recovery Administration (NRA), and a member of the National Labor Relations Board (NLRB).

Leiserson's favorite government position was chairman of the National Mediation Board. This organization became the U.S. government's administrative arm for implementing the Railway Labor Act, which Leiserson was instrumental in writing for the U.S. Congress. The Act was later amended to include the airline industry.

Most of his government positions were appointments by Franklin D. Roosevelt. After leaving government service, he retired and returned to research and teaching at Johns Hopkins University. Leiserson died in 1957 at the age of 74. Leiserson was awarded the honorary degree of Doctor of Laws by Oberlin College, on June 24, 1947.
