= Irene Osgood Andrews =

American writer (1879–1963)

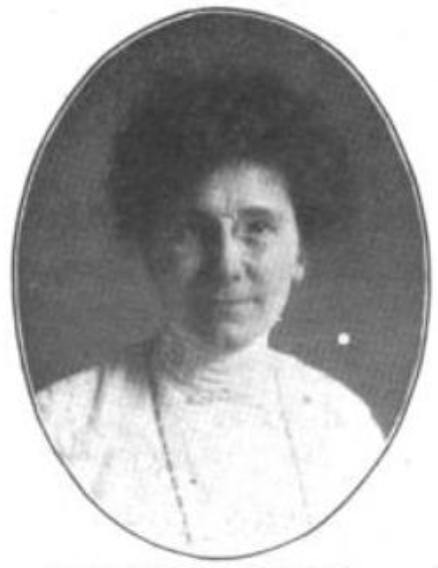
- Irene Osgood Andrews, from a 1912 publication
- Born: January 18, 1879; Big Rapids, Michigan
- Died: February 1963 (aged 84)
- Spouse: John Bertram Andrews (m. 1910–1943)

Irene Osgood Andrews (January 18, 1879 – February 1963) was an American writer on problems of women in industry.

== Early life and education ==
Irene Osgood was born in Big Rapids, Michigan, the daughter of Lucius L. Osgood and Mary Markley. She was educated at the School of Philanthropy in New York and at the University of Wisconsin, graduating with an A.B. in 1905.

== Career ==
Osgood began her career as agent for the Associated Charities at Minneapolis, Minnesota. In 1906 she was appointed special agent for relief work in the American Red Cross in San Francisco, and factory inspector in Wisconsin. She was head resident of the Northwestern University Settlement, Chicago in 1907. She became assistant secretary of the American Association for Labor Legislation in 1908, working alongside her husband on investigations, including one project on phosphorus poisoning in factory workers.

Andrews was a member of the Y.W.C.A. National Industrial Commission to Europe (1918). In the 1920s, she worked on the Legislative Committee of the League of Women Voters LWV in New York. and spoke at LWV events. She was also active in the Citizens Union.

Andrews often wrote reports and pamphlets, including Review of Labor Legislation of 1909 (1909), Tendencies of the Labor Legislation of 1910 (1911), Working Women in Tanneries, Minimum Wage Legislation (1914), Third Report of the Factory Investigating Committee (1914), The Relation of Irregular Employment and the Living Wage for Women (1915), Preliminary Economic Studies of the War (1918), The Economic Effects of the War upon Women and Children in Great Britain (1918, 1921), The Protection of Maternity an Urgent Need (1920), Childbirth Protection, and Industrial Health (1924).

== Personal life ==
Osgood married economist and labor organizer John Bertram Andrews on August 8, 1910; they had a son, John Osgood Andrews. She was widowed when John B. Andrews died in 1943; she died in 1963, aged 83 years.
