= Paul Nystrom =

American economist

Paul H. Nystrom
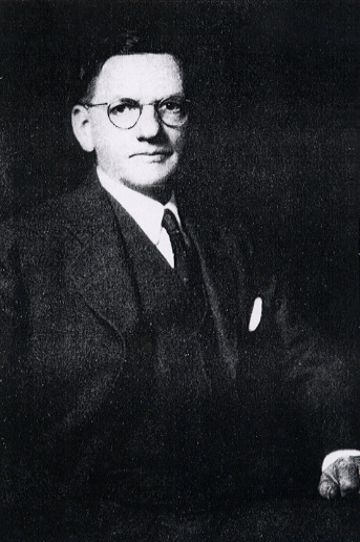
- Paul Henry Nystrom
- Born: January 25, 1878; Maiden Rock, Wisconsin
- Died: August 17, 1969 (aged 91); Nanuet, New York

Academic background
- Education: University of Wisconsin
- Doctoral advisor: William Amasa Scott

Academic work
- Discipline: Marketing
- Institutions: Columbia University

Paul Henry Nystrom (January 25, 1878 – August 17, 1969) was an American economist, and professor of marketing at Columbia University. He is most known as pioneer in marketing, and for his The Economics of Retailing (1915) and his Economics of Fashion (1928).

== Biography ==
Nystrom obtained his Ph.B. from the University of Wisconsin in 1909, and his Ph.M. in 1910, and his Ph.D. in 1914 under William Amasa Scott (1862–1944).

Nystrom started his academic career as assistant professor of Political Economy in the University of Wisconsin. He later became associate professor of economics in the University of Minnesota and eventually professor of marketing at Columbia University, where he retired in 1950.

Nystrom served as editor of the American Marketing Journal and as the first editor of its successor, the Journal of Marketing. He was also a founding member of the American Marketing Association.

Nystrom is frequently associated with the philosophy of futility, a phrase which he coined in his 1928 book Economics of Fashion to describe the disposition caused by the monotony of the new industrial age. In this work he also contributed to the concept of Hemline index.

== Work ==
=== The Economics of Retailing, 1915 ===
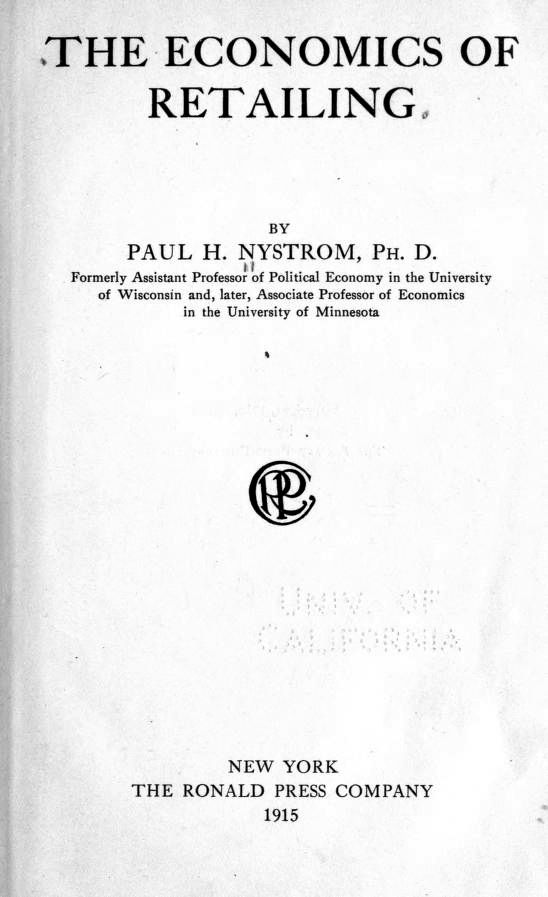
The Economics of Retailing, 1915.

In the preface of "The Economics of Retailing," Nystrom explained the aim of the book and its restrictions:

"This book aims to present fact material and to suggest constructive thought on the subject of retail distribution. It does not tell how to get rich quick at retailing. It presents but little theory and advocates no particular or special method of doing the work of the retail store. Its purpose is to describe the retail business as it is, and to point out the broad lines along which retailing progress is being made.
In this work the attempt has been made to reduce the knowledge about retailing to teachable form, and to make it usable alike to the ambitious, thinking man already in business and to the student who desires to gain an intimate insight into this interesting as well as important field of human work."

And furthermore:

"Except in fragmentary form, there has been but little written upon which the writer could build. The effort has been made, with what success the reader must judge, to bring together in one volume a summary of the best thought so far expressed; but much of the material presented is the result of the writer's own observation and experience in the retail business, and of what he has gathered in conference with over a thousand retail store managers and salespeople who were students in his classes in retail methods during the years 1909 to 1915."

==== Distribution and the modern distributive system ====
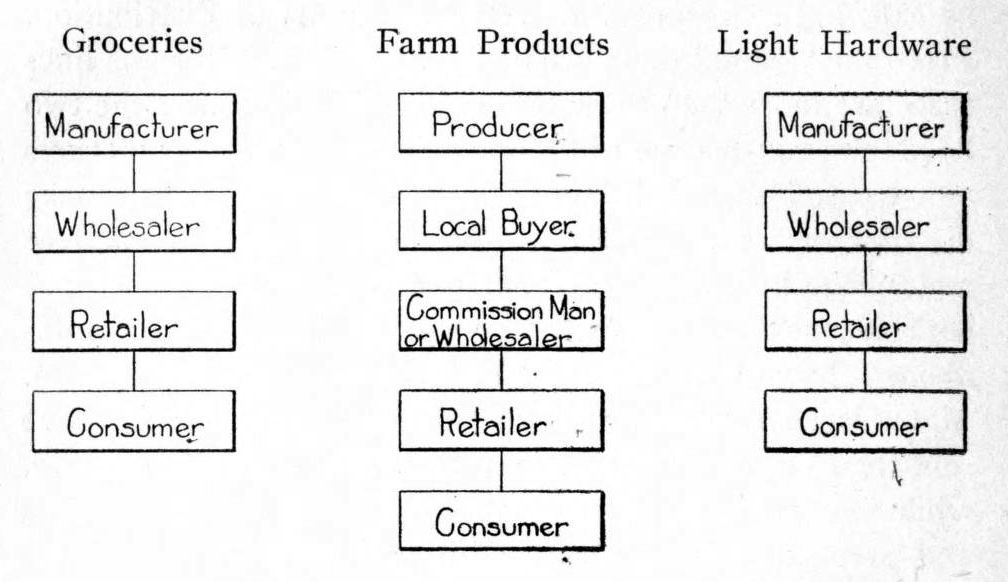
Channels of distribution for various lines of goods, 1915

The key concept in "The Economics of Retailing" is the concept of distribution. Nystrom explained that "the term 'distribution' is used in another sense in the standard books on political economy. There, it means the shares of income received by members of society for their participation in, or contribution to, the economic system. The term as used here has no reference to the income of any one."

The term is used in the meaning of logistics. Nystrom It refers solely to the processes of carrying and exchanging material goods, and, used in that sense, is but a part or a phase of what economic treatises call 'production.' Wherever the term distribution is used in this work it should be remembered that it means distribution of goods, and not what technical treatises on economic theory call distribution of wealth."

In the modern distributive system producers and consumers are regularly departed by at least two middlemen: the wholesaler and the retailer. Nystrom presented the following series of charts "to give a clear idea of the customary channels of distribution in the main lines of trade passing from the producer to the consumer through retail stores."

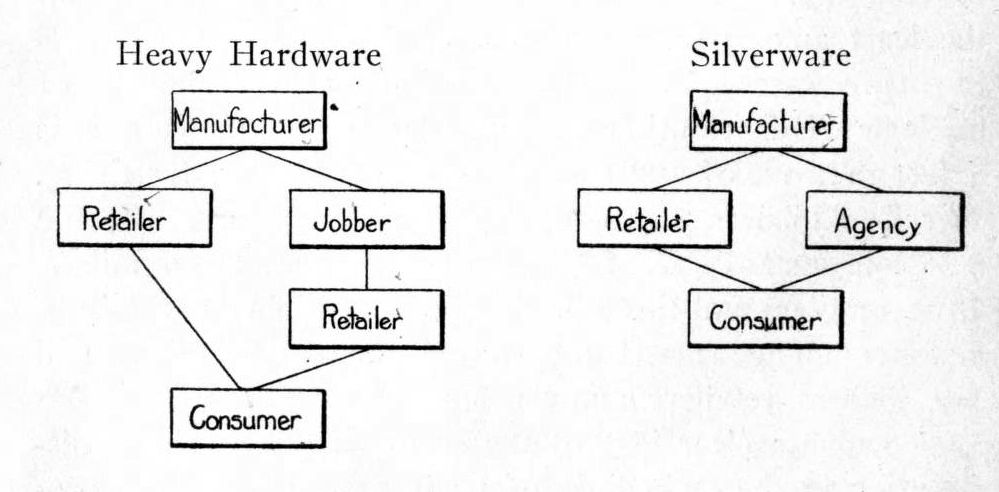
Channels of distribution, Heavy Hardware and Silverware, 1915

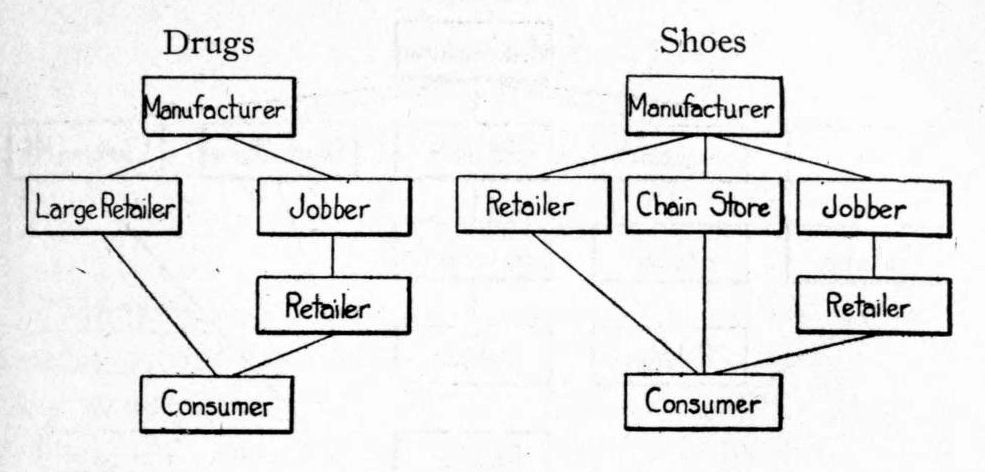
Channels of distribution, Drugs and Shoes, 1915

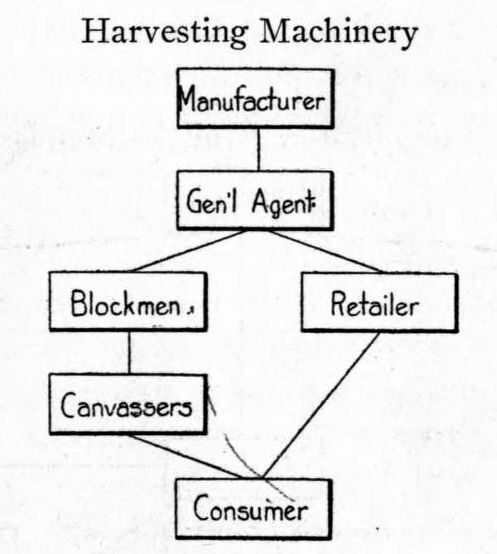
Channels of distribution, Harvesting Machinery, 1915

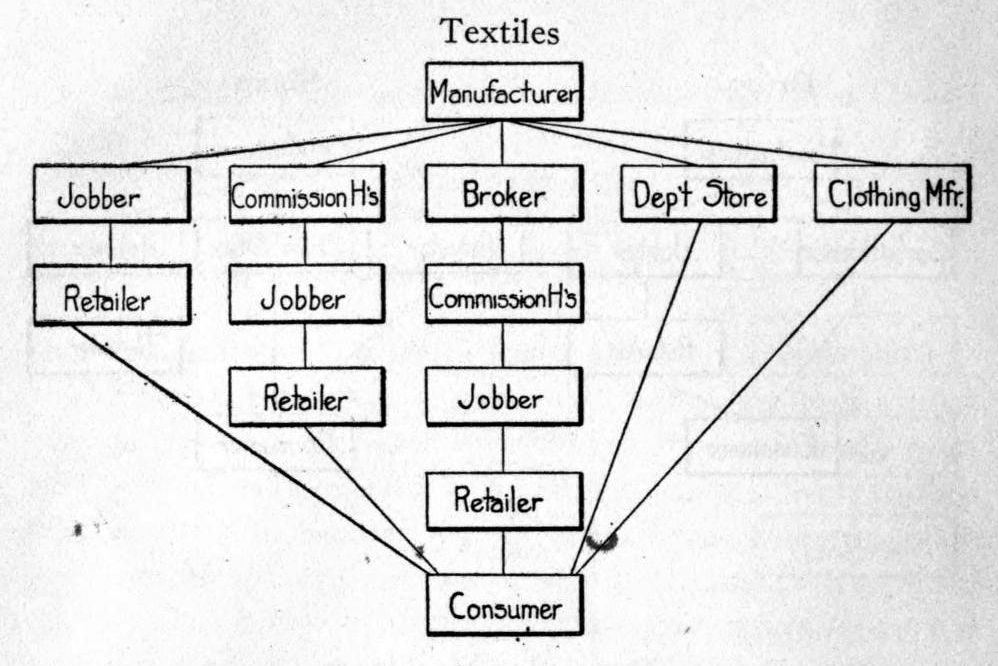
Channels of distribution, Textiles, 1915

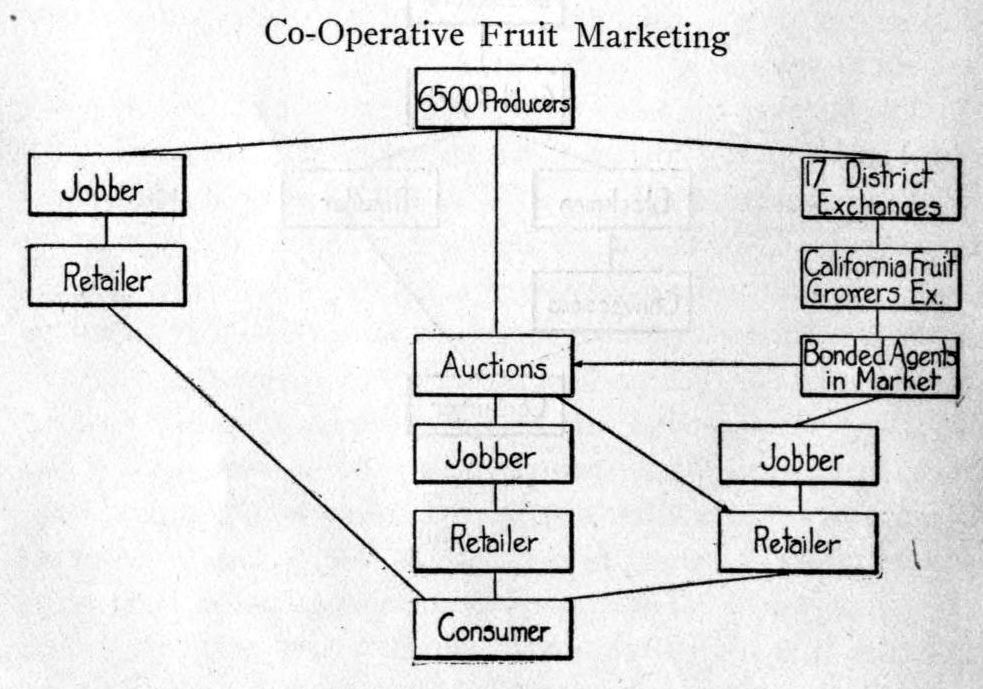
Channels of distribution, Co-Operative Fruit Marketing, 1915

==== Organization of the department store ====
In chapter 12 Nystrom described the organization of the department store and introduced two types of organizational structures. He introduced the department store as "a retailing institution that deals in several lines of goods, each line separated or 'departmentized' from the rest, both in location within the building and in the concern's accounting and management systems. Each department is considered practically as a store in itself, and in large stores each has its separate organization of buyer, or department manager, and salespeople, much the same as any independent store."

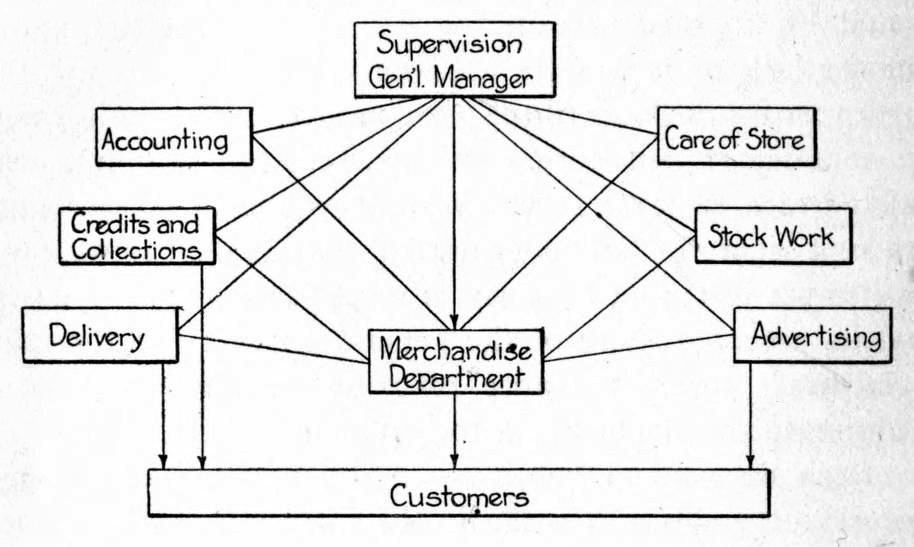
Internal Organization of Specialty Store, 1915

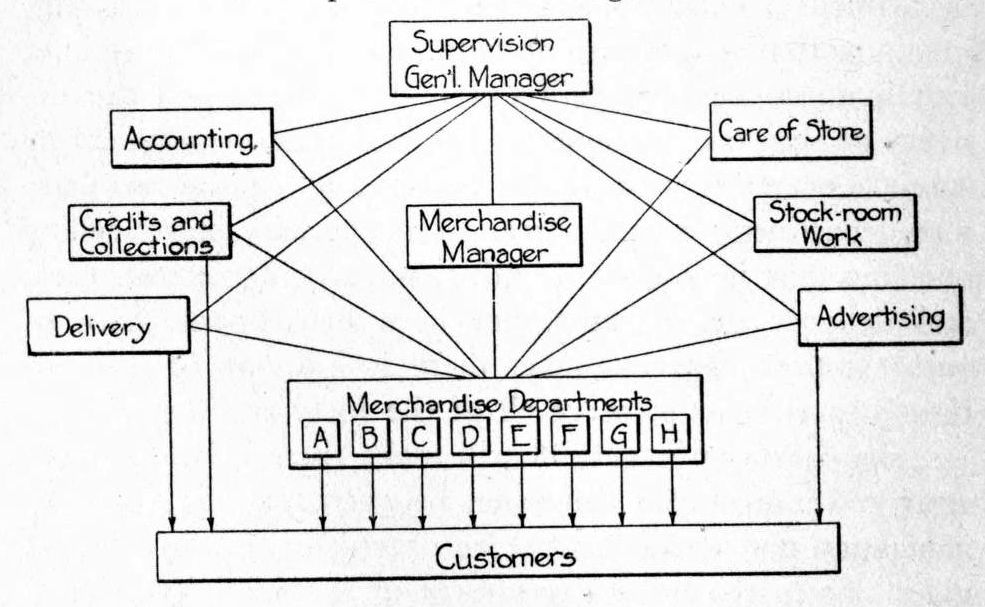
Internal Organization of Department Store.

About the organization he explained:

"In a department store, each department or section is considered as a separate specialty store or shop. Its accounts are kept separate, and under normal conditions it must stand on its own feet; that is to say, it must pay its own expenses, and its prorated share of the general expenditure for rent, light, heat, power, insurance, office up-keep, and so on. In addition to this it must seek to make a net profit.
Each department has its own organization for buying and selling goods, consisting in the former case of its manager or buyer and necessary assistants such as assistant buyer, head of stock, and salespeople. In these respects the department is exactly like a specialty store, but the accounting, advertising, stockroom work, credits and collections, handling of the cash paid out and received, and the delivery of the goods is done for the individual department by special departments organized to serve all of the merchandise departments in the store. The specialty store, selling one line, has its own accounting, advertising, credit, cash, and delivery departments, but in a department store of forty sections, for example, there is but one of each of these departments to serve all of the forty sections."

More specific on the charts, he noted:

"The charts will make these relations more clear and indicate the difference between specialty store organization and department store organization. In Chart 1 the single merchandise department of the specialty store is served by all of the surrounding departments. In Chart 2 the merchandise departments A, B, C, D, E, F, G, and H are all served by the same number of special departments, excepting that one new one has been added, viz., merchandise manager. This official acts as a sort of head buyer for all departments, apportions the buying funds among the departments, advises the buyers, gives approval or disapproval to department sales policies, and so on."

==== Reception ====
In a 1916 review of this work Carroll W. Doten expressed the importance of this work. She said:

"There can be no doubt that the retail store is one of the most important links in the chain of activities and processes by which the wants of the consumers are met by a ceaseless flow of goods from producers. It would be interesting and enlightening to know just how much this service costs. The author states that the "distribution" of goods, which includes transportation, insurance, and storage as well as the selling, probably costs more than the manufacturing. It is generally recognized that there is great inefficiency and waste in retailing. Here then is the place where statistics should be made available, if we are to deal intelligently with the rising cost of living. The author has made excellent use of what figures he could get while at the same time he points out their inaccuracies and inadequacy..."

=== Economics of fashion, 1928 ===
In Economics of fashion, Nystrom presented a notable opinion about style and fashion. He stated:

"Style is a characteristic, or distinctive, mode or method of expression, presentation, or conception in the field of some art; fashion is nothing more or less than the prevailing style at any given time."

Sproles (1974) stated, that "for centuries the phenomena of fashion behavior have been the varied subject of social analysts, cultural historians, moral critics, academic theorists, and business entrepreneurs. Spanning decades and centuries of changing fashions, literally thousands of commentaries focusing on the vagaries and nuances of fashion behavior have been published. Taken collectively, this major body of analytical commentary and anecdotal opinion describes fashion as a complex, diffuse, often perplexing, highly visible characteristic of civilizations." In this matter Nystrom is clearly an exception.

Carolyn Mair (2014) added, that Nystrom in his 1931 work had "argued that the industrial revolution had induced a ‘philosophy of futility’ that would increase the consumption of goods and services as an activity for its own sake. He discussed the concept of conspicuous consumption as behavioural addiction, narcissistic behaviour or both which was a means to satisfy consumers’ desire for instant gratification of hedonic expectations."

== Selected publications ==
- Nystrom, Paul H. Retail Selling and Store Management (1914, 1916, 1919)
- Nystrom, Paul H. The Economics of Retailing (1915, 1930)
- Nystrom, Paul H. Textiles (1916)
- Nystrom, Paul H. Retail Store Management (1917, 1922)
- Nystrom, Paul H. Automobile Selling - A Manual for Dealers (1919)
- Nystrom, Paul H. Economics of Fashion (1928)
- Nystrom, Paul H. Economic Principles of Consumption (1929, 1931)
- Nystrom, Paul H. Fashion Merchandising (1932)
- Nystrom, Paul H. Retail Institutions and Trends (1932)
- Nystrom, Paul H. Trends Dangerous to Consumers Under the NRA (1935)
- Nystrom, Paul H. Retail Store Operation (1946)
- Nystrom, Paul H. Marketing Handbook (1951)
- Nystrom, Paul H. Automobile Selling (unknown)
