= John Q. Emery =

American educator and civil servant (1843–1928)

John Emery

15th Superintendent of Public Instruction of Wisconsin
- In office January 7, 1895 – January 2, 1899
- Preceded by: Oliver Elwin Wells
- Succeeded by: Lorenzo D. Harvey

Personal details
- Born: John Quincy Emery; September 15, 1843 Liberty, Ohio, U.S.
- Died: August 6, 1928 (aged 84) Madison, Wisconsin, U.S.
- Party: Republican

John Quincy Emery (September 15, 1843 – August 6, 1928) was an American educator and civil servant.

== Early life and education ==
Born in Liberty, Ohio, he moved with his parents to Albion, Wisconsin. He attended Albion Academy in Dane County, Wisconsin, where he graduated in 1866. He then became a teacher.

== Career ==
After fighting in the American Civil War, Emery returned to education. He served as the school supervisor and principal at River Falls Normal School (now the University of Wisconsin–River Falls). He served as the Superintendent of Public Instruction of Wisconsin from 1895 to 1899. Later he was appointed Wisconsin Dairy and Food Commissioner. When he retired in 1926, he was Wisconsin's oldest state employee at the age of 83.

== Death ==
Emery died at Wisconsin General Hospital in Madison, Wisconsin at the age of 84.
