= Adna Ferrin Weber =

American statistician and economist

Adna Ferrin Weber, AKA Adna F. Weber (July 14, 1870 – February 28, 1968) was an American statistician and economist.

== Biography ==
Adna Ferrin Weber was born on July 14, 1870, in Concord, New York. He earned a PhD from Columbia University.

Weber served as the Deputy Commissioner of Labor Statistics in New York. In 1906, he co-founded the American Association for Labor Legislation and served as its first secretary from 1906 to 1907.

== Bibliography ==
- The Historical Development of the English Cabinet, Thesis (Ph. B.), Cornell University, Ithaca, N.Y., 1894
- with John MacMackin, Henry C. Southwick: Bulletin of the Bureau of Labor Statistics of the State of New York, New York, etc., 1899
- The Growth of Cities in the Nineteenth Century: A Study in Statistics, Dissertation, Columbia University, New York, 1899
- Growth of Cities in the United States, 1890-1900, 1901
- Social value on trade-unionism, Published by the Church Association for the Advancement of the Interests of Labor, New York, 1901
- Employers' Liability and Accident Insurance, in: Political Science Quarterly, volume 17, no. 2., Academy of Political Science, New York, etc., Jun. 1902, S. 256–283.
- Labor Legislation in New York, in: Monographs on social economics, 2, New York State Department of Labor, Albany, N.Y., 1904
- The Growth of Industry in New York, in: Monographs on social economics, 4, New York State Department of Labor, Albany, N.Y., 1904
- The Significance of Recent City Growth: The Era of Small Industrial Centres, in: Annals of the American Academy of Political and Social Science, volume 23, no. 2., American Academy of Political and Social Science, Philadelphia, 1904
- Present Status of Statistical Work and How it Needs to be Developed in the Service of the States, in: Publications of the American Statistical Association, volume 14, no. 106, The Association, Boston, Mass., Jun. 1914, S. 97–102.
