= American Association for Labor Legislation =

Defunct, 20th-century American organization

- Formation: February 15, 1906; 120 years ago
- Founded at: Albany, New York
- Dissolved: 1945
- Type: Nonprofit, NGO
- Purpose: "to promote sound human relationships in industry by consultation, fact studies and publicity"
- Location: Albany, US
- Official language: English
- 1st President: Richard T. Ely
- 1st Secretary: John R. Commons
- Key people: John Bertram Andrews, 3rd and final Secretary (1910–1942)
- Parent organization: International Association for Labor Legislation

The American Association for Labor Legislation (AALL; 1906–1945) was an early advocacy group for national health insurance in the United States of America, conceived in 1905, established in 1906, active to 1943, and disbanded in 1945. John Bertram Andrews ran the organization for three decades (1910–1942) as its secretary.

== Mission ==
The AALL's purposes were to: serve as American branch of the International Association for Labor Legislation, promote uniform US labor legislation, and encourage study of labor legislation.

== History ==
In 1905, the American Association for Labor Legislation was conceived by a small group of economists. Initially their goal was "the study of labor conditions and labor legislation in the United States."

The AALL charter was drawn up and signed on February 15, 1906, by 21 charter members who included Mary Van Kleeck. The AALL comprised three groups: a General Administrative Council, an Executive Committee, and General Officers.

By 1909, however, under the leadership of John Bertram Andrews, this "study" group took an activist turn and began actively promoting, lobbying for, and effecting major changes in worker's compensation, occupational health and safety, and child labor laws." In a sense, the AALL was "proto-think tank":

The AALL was one of the first organizations that might be classified as a think tank. The appellation of first think tank is usually given to the Brookings Institute [recte Brookings Institution], the forerunner to which was founded in 1916. Given the subsequent development of that region of the public sphere, it is probably correct to say so. The AALL, however, was a historical alternative to the Brookings model of the think tank. Organized as a quasi-professional association rather than a foundation entrusted by philanthropists or corporate interests, the leaders of the AALL viewed policy involvement as an aim and requirement of academic social science.

In 1912 Theodore Roosevelt included social insurance for sickness in the platform of his Progressive Party (United States, 1912). Around 1915 the group American Association for Labor Legislation attempted to introduce a medical insurance bill to some state legislatures. These attempts were not successful, and as a result controversy about national insurance came about. National groups supporting the idea of government health insurance included the AFL–CIO, the American Nurses Association, National Association of Social Workers, and the Socialist Party USA. The most prominent opponent of national medical insurance was the American Medical Association (AMA); others included the American Hospital Association, the US Chamber of Commerce, and the Life Insurance Association of People.

The American Association for Labor Legislation continued to take part in the health advocacy. For example, in 1917, they proposed a national health insurance act that included a provision for weekly cash allocations for pregnant women.

In 1943, the AALL became inactive with the death of its three-decade secretary John Bertram Andrews and shut down in 1945.

== Successes ==
The AALL was successful in helping to pass the following legislation:

- Industrial Disease Legislation
- Industrial Accident Legislation
- Health Insurance Legislation
- Unemployment Legislation

== Funding ==
The AALL contributors included the Carnegie Foundation, the Milbank Fund, and the Russell Sage Foundation as well as John D. Rockefeller and Thomas Chadbourne.

== People ==
Presidents

- Richard T. Ely (1906–1907)
- Henry Walcott Farnam (1908–1910)
- Henry R. Seager (1911–1912)
- William F. Willoughby (1913)
- Henry Rogers Seager (1914–1915)
- Irving Fisher (1916–1917)
- Samuel Lindsay (1917–1919)
- Thomas Chadbourne (1920–1926)
- Sam Lewisohn (1927–1928)
- Thomas Parkinson (1929)
- Joseph Chamberlain (1930)
- Ernest Draper (1931–1933)
- Leo Wolman (1934)
- Joseph Chamberlain (1935–1945)

Secretaries

- Adna Ferrin Weber (1906–1907)
- John R. Commons (1908–1909)
- John Bertram Andrews (1910–1942))

Others involved included:

- Irene Osgood Andrews, assistant secretary (1908)
- Solon De Leon, field investigator, writer, researcher (1912–1920)
- Juliet Stuart Poyntz, investigator (1914)

AALL membership peaked in 1913 with 3,348 members but remained around 3,000 into the 1930s.

== Publications ==
The AALL published American Labor Legislation Review from 1911 to 1943. "In addition to the Review, the Association published pamphlets, leaflets and reprints of magazine articles and editorials in large quantities for the use of its members and others interested in liberal social legislation."

== See also ==
- Brookings Institution
- Think tank

== External sources ==
- Moss, David A. (1992). Political Economy of Insecurity: The American Association for Labor Legislation and the Crusade for Social Welfare Reform in the Progressive Era (doctoral thesis). Yale University.
