= Philosophy of futility =

Philosophy of futility refers to a tendency to become quickly bored and, consequently, a continual appetite for newness and change. The phrase was coined in 1928 by Columbia University marketing professor Paul Nystrom to describe the increasingly prevalent outlook which, he believed, induced a greater demand for fashionable products. The growth of industrialization had brought about a narrowing of interests, contacts, and achievements for many people in the Western world. Such conditions of life, Nystrom observed, encourage quick boredom and a greater interest in goods in which fashion dominates, such as apparel, automobiles, and home furnishings.

The following is a quotation from Nystrom's Economics of Fashion (1928), often cited by historians and analysts of marketing, consumerism, and commercialism:

One's outlook on life and its purposes may greatly modify one's attitude toward goods in which fashion is prominent. At the present time, not a few people in western nations have departed from old-time standards of religion and philosophy, and having failed to develop forceful views to take their places, hold to something that may be called, for want of a better name, a philosophy of futility. This view of life (or lack of a view of life) involves a question as to the value of motives and purposes of the main human activities. There is ever a tendency to challenge the purpose of life itself. This lack of purpose in life has an effect on consumption similar to that of having a narrow life interest, that is, in concentrating human attention on the more superficial things in which fashion reigns.

Philosophy of Futility and Retail Therapy:

Shopping in order to make oneself feel happier is a symptom that is referred to as “retail therapy” in the popular press. The term was first used in the Chicago Tribune of December 24, 1986: "We've become a nation measuring out our lives in shopping bags and nursing our psychic ills through retail therapy". Retail therapy, sometimes observed in people in times of depression or transition, indicates lack of personal purpose, and involves shopping as a therapeutic act that improves the buyer's mood or disposition; therefore, goods purchased during retail therapy are often referred to as "comfort buys."

The “vicious cycle” in Nystrom's theory can be seen in many economic and philosophical arenas. Robert and Edward Skidelsky, in a father-and-son/economist-and-philosopher writing partnership, discuss that needs are finite and can be satisfied, but wants are infinite in quantity. Adam Smith, a pioneer in political economy, states his Theory of Moral Sentiments that “Riches leave a man always as much and sometimes more exposed than before to anxiety, to fear and to sorrow.”

Advertising can manipulate those wants, and make them appear as needs by making consumers feel they are not whole or happy without their product. In his criticism of Christianity, Friedrich Nietzsche said "To act as a physician," he writes, "the priest must make one sick!" For Christianity to appear as the savior, people must first have a problem. Advertising can make their product be the savior of a consumer's problem.

Advertising can be particularly influential on children. Between the ages of 2 and 5, children are unable to distinguish between advertising and scheduled television broadcasts. Many countries have banned advertising targeting children to help avoid marketing saturation, and to allow them time to develop an identity beyond that of a consumer. Child advocates have condemned ads from children's cereals for their lack of nutritional value leading to child obesity to advertising campaigns for action figures based on adult movies or themes. With the average US youth seeing anywhere from 2000 to 3000 ads a day, the content and intent of those ads has increasingly come under scrutiny.

== See also ==
- Affluenza
- Conspicuous consumption
- Thorstein Veblen
- Mass society
- Anomie
- Nihilism
- Novelty seeking
