= William Amasa Scott =

American economist (1862–1944)

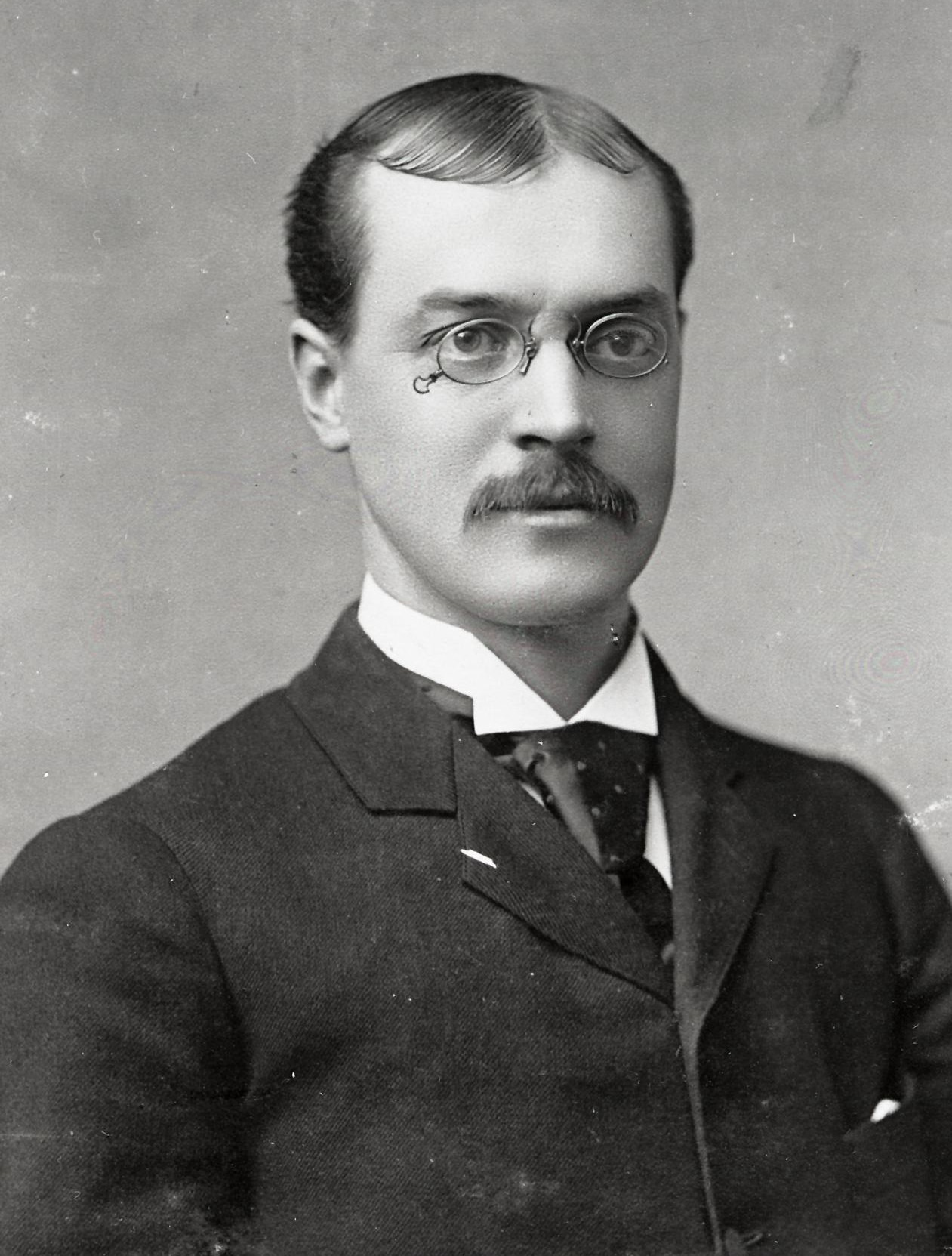

William Amasa Scott (April 17, 1862 in Clarkson, New York–1944) was an American economist and one of the leading representatives of the marginalist school.

He received his B.A. from the University of Rochester in 1886, and his PhD under supervision of Richard T. Ely from Johns Hopkins University in 1892. Scott was a professor of Political Economy at the University of Wisconsin–Madison until 1931, and a contributor to John Kells Ingram’s A History of Political Economy.

== Bibliography ==
- Scott, William A. (1908). "Rates on the New York Money Market, 1896-1906". Journal of Political Economy. 16 (5): 273–98. doi:10.1086/251433. JSTOR 1820296.
- William A. Scott (1911). "The Administration and Control of the Proposed Central Reserve Association". Journal of Political Economy. 19 (10): 841–55. doi:10.1086/251938. JSTOR 1820331.
- Scott, William A. (1922). "Popular and Unpopular Activities of the Federal Reserve Board and the Federal Reserve Banks". The Annals of the American Academy of Political and Social Science. 99 (1): 203–09. doi:10.1177/000271622209900129. JSTOR 1014531. S2CID 144008673.
- William Amasa Scott (1893). The Repudiation of State Debts. T.Y. Crowell & Company.
- William Amasa Scott (1916). Money and Banking. H. Holt.
