= John Bertram Andrews =

American economist

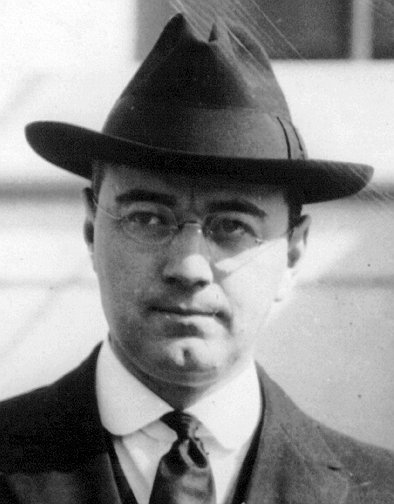
John Bertram Andrews

John Bertram Andrews (1880–1943) was an American economist.

== Background ==
John Bertram Andrews born in 1880 in South Wayne, Wisconsin, and was educated at the University of Wisconsin and at Dartmouth College.

== Career ==
Andrews taught economics at both the University of Wisconsin and Dartmouth College.

In 1906, he co-founded the American Association for Labor Legislation (AALL) with other economists. In 1911, he founded the American Labor Legislation Review with the purpose of recording advances in social reforms.

In 1921, Andrews was called by President Harding to serve on the Unemployment Conference. He was a member of the secretariat to the League of Nations' first official International Labor Conference in Washington, D.C.

== Works ==
Together with John R. Commons, he was the author of Principles of Labor Legislation (1916) and History of Labor in the United States (1918).
