= John R. Commons =

American economist and historian (1862–1945)

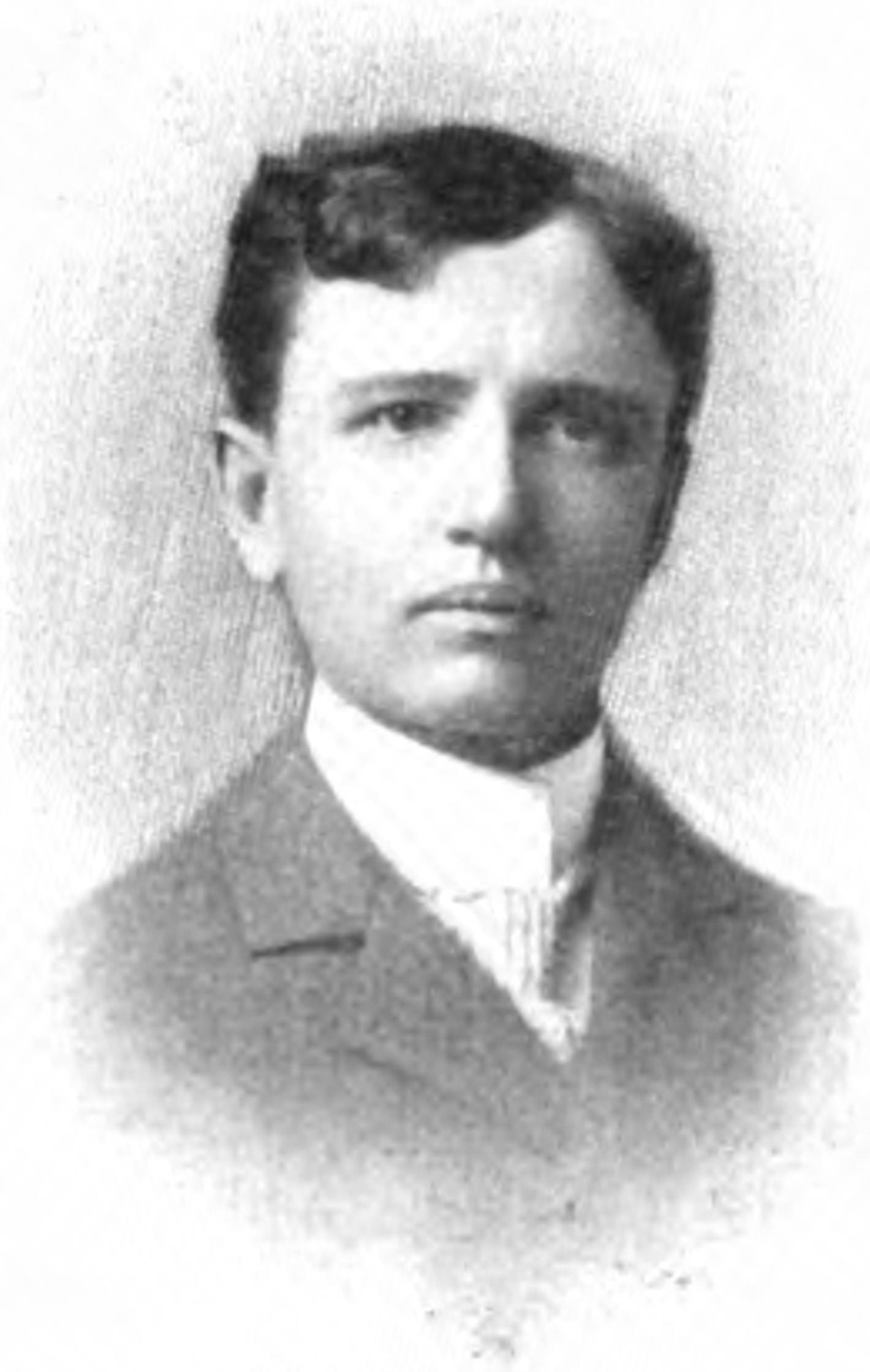
- From The Independent, Volume 63 (1907)
- Born: October 13, 1862; Hollansburg, Ohio, US
- Died: May 11, 1945 (aged 82); Fort Lauderdale, Florida, US

Academic background
- Doctoral advisor: Richard T. Ely
- Influences: Henry Dunning Macleod

Academic work
- Discipline: Institutional economics, labor history
- School or tradition: Institutional economics
- Doctoral students: Alvin Hansen, Edwin E. Witte

John Rogers Commons (October 13, 1862 – May 11, 1945) was an American institutional economist, Georgist, progressive and labor historian at the University of Wisconsin–Madison.

== Early years ==
John R. Commons was born in Hollansburg, Ohio on October 13, 1862. Commons had a religious upbringing which led him to be an advocate for social justice early in life. Commons was considered a poor student and suffered from a mental illness while studying. He was allowed to graduate without finishing because of the potential seen in his intense determination and curiosity. At this time, Commons became a follower of Henry George's 'single tax' economics. He carried this 'Georgist' or 'Ricardian' approach to economics, with a focus on land and monopoly rents, throughout the rest of his life, including a proposal for income taxes with higher rates on land rents.

After graduating from Oberlin College, Commons did two years of graduate studies at Johns Hopkins University, where he studied under Richard T. Ely, but left without a degree. After appointments at Oberlin and Indiana University, Commons began teaching at Syracuse University in 1895.

In spring 1899, Syracuse dismissed him as a radical. Eventually Commons re-entered academia at the University of Wisconsin in 1904.

Commons' early work exemplified his desire to unite Christian ideals with the emerging social sciences of sociology and economics. He was a frequent contributor to Kingdom magazine, was a founder of the American Institute for Christian Sociology, and authored a book in 1894 called Social Reform and the Church. He was an advocate of temperance legislation and was active in the national Prohibition Party. By his Wisconsin years, Commons' scholarship had become less moralistic and more empirical, and he moved away from a religious viewpoint in his ethics and sociology.

== Career ==
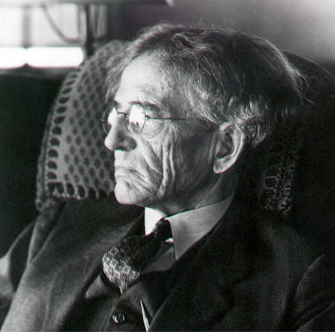
Commons at his desk at the University of Wisconsin in the 1920s.

Commons is best known for developing an analysis of collective action by the state and other institutions, which he saw as essential to understanding economics. Commons believed that carefully crafted legislation could create social change; that view led him to be known as a socialist radical and incrementalist. Contrary to some published accounts, Commons did consider African Americans capable of voting. When he advocated proportional representation, he suggested a "negro party". He even suggested applying the Thirteenth Amendment to the Constitution to force Southern States to allow African Americans to vote.

Commons continued the strong American tradition in institutional economics by such figures as the economist and social theorist Thorstein Veblen. His notion of transaction is one of the most important contributions to Institutional Economics. The institutional theory was closely related to his remarkable successes in fact-finding and drafting legislation on a wide range of social issues for the state of Wisconsin. He drafted legislation establishing Wisconsin's worker's compensation program, the first of its kind in the United States. Commons also coined the term "human resource" in 1893, laying a foundation for the fields of human resources and human resource management.

In 1906, Commons co-founded the American Association for Labor Legislation (AALL) with other economists. Commons was a contributor to The Pittsburgh Survey, a 1907 sociological investigation of a single American city. His graduate student, John A. Fitch, wrote The Steel Workers, a classic depiction of a key industry in early 20th-century America. It was one of six key texts to come out of the survey. Edwin E. Witte, later known as the "father of social security" also did his PhD at the University of Wisconsin–Madison under Commons.

Commons was a leading advocate of proportional representation in the United States, writing a book on the subject in 1907 and serving as vice-president of the Proportional Representation League.

Commons undertook two major studies of the history of labor unions in the United States. Beginning in 1910, he edited A Documentary History of American Industrial Society, a large work that preserved many original-source documents of the American labor movement. Almost as soon as that work was complete, Commons began editing History of Labor in the United States, a narrative work which built on the previous 10-volume documentary history.

The first national honor society in economics, Omicron Delta Gamma (ODG), was formed on May 7, 1915, by the merger of Harvard University's Undergraduate Society of Economics with the University of Wisconsin's Order of Artus, an economics student society modeled on King Arthur's Knights of the Roundtable; Wisconsin's group was advised by Commons.

In 1934, Commons published Institutional Economics, which laid out his view that institutions were made up of collective actions that, along with conflict of interests, defined the economy. He believed that institutional economics added collective control of individual transactions to existing economic theory. Commons considered the Scottish economist Henry Dunning Macleod to be the "originator" of Institutional economics.

Commons was elected to the American Philosophical Society in 1936.

== Death and legacy ==
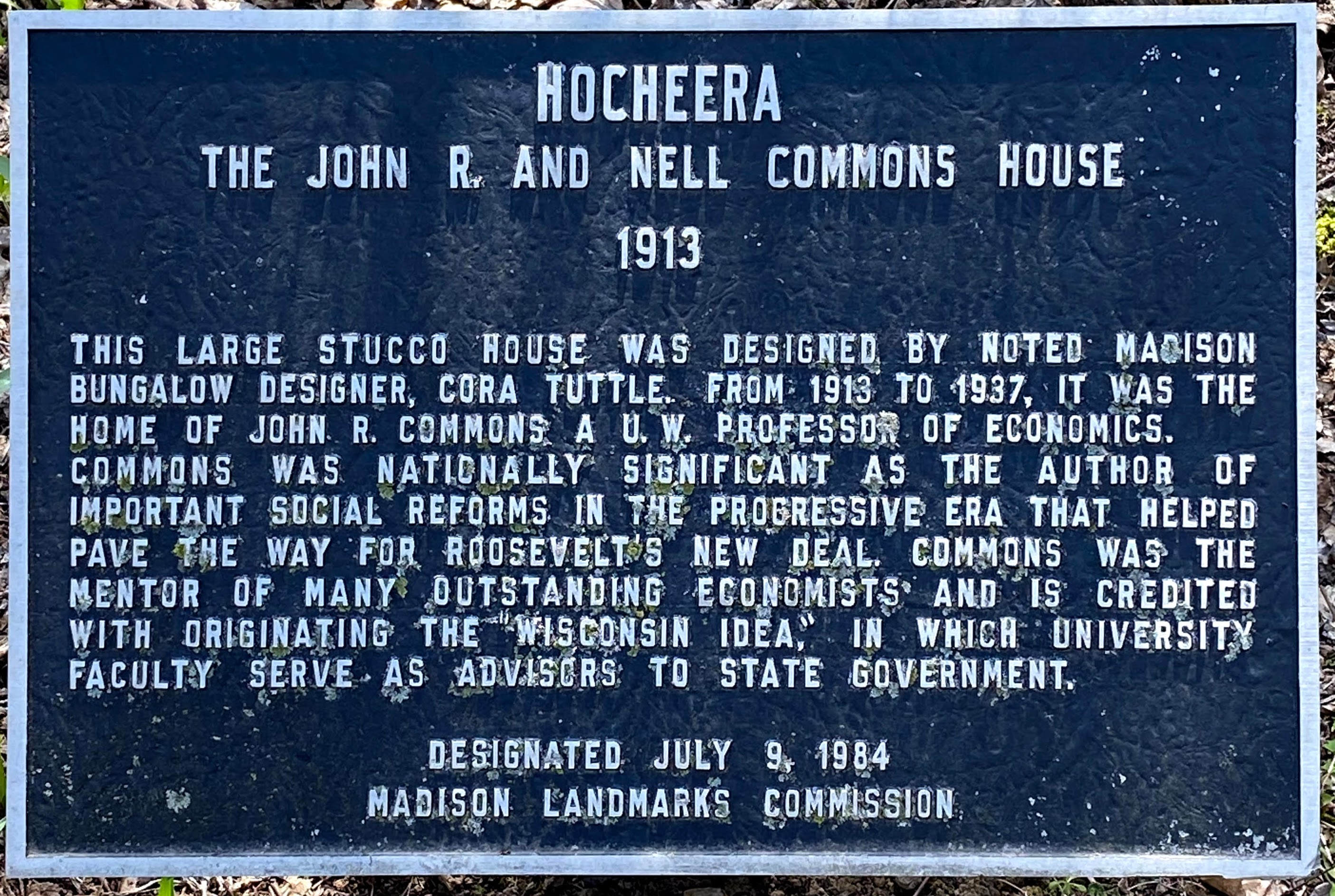
The John R. and Nell Commons House Landmark Designation Sign

Commons died on May 11, 1945. Today, Commons's contribution to labor history is considered equal to his contributions to the theory of institutional economics. He also made valuable contributions to the history of economic thought, especially with regard to collective action. He is honored at the University of Wisconsin in Madison with rooms and clubs named for him.

Commons was the mentor of many outstanding economists and has been credited with originating the "Wisconsin Idea," in which university faculty serve as advisors to state government.

His former home, The John R. and Nell Commons House, is listed on the National Register of Historic Places.

The John R. Commons Award is awarded biennially to an outstanding economist in recognition of academic achievements and for service both to the economics profession and to Omicron Delta Epsilon. The award is given at American Economic Association conference where the honoree presents a "Commons Lecture" which is later published in The American Economist. Over the years, the Commons Award has served as an indicator of recipients of the Nobel Memorial Prize in Economic Sciences. Nine Commons Award winners have won the Nobel Prize; most recently, Claudia Goldin (2009) won the Nobel in 2023.

== Quotes ==
- "An institution is defined as collective action in control, liberation and expansion of individual action." —"Institutional Economics" American Economic Review, vol. 21 (December 1931), pp. 648–657.
- "...But the smallest unit of the institutional economists is a unit of activity — a transaction, with its participants. Transactions intervene between the labor of the classic economists and the pleasures of the hedonic economists, simply because it is society that controls access to the forces of nature, and transactions are, not the "exchange of commodities," but the alienation and acquisition, between individuals, of the rights of property and liberty created by society, which must therefore be negotiated between the parties concerned before labor can produce, or consumers can consume, or commodities be physically exchanged..." —"Institutional Economics" American Economic Review, vol. 21 (December 1931), pp. 648–657.

== Publications ==
Solely authored works

- The Distribution of Wealth. New York: Macmillan, 1893.
- Social Reform and the Church. New York: Thomas Y. Crowell, 1894.
- Proportional Representation. New York: Crowell, 1896. Second Edition: Macmillan, 1907.
- City Government. Albany, NY: University of the State of New York Extension Dept., 1898.
- Races and Immigrants in America. New York: Macmillan, 1907.
- Horace Greeley and the Working Class Origins of the Republican Party. Boston: Ginn and Co., 1909.
- Labor and Administration. New York: Macmillan, 1913.
- Industrial Goodwill. New York: McGraw-Hill Book Co., 1919.
- Trade Unionism and Labor Problems. Boston: Ginn and Co., 1921.
- Legal Foundations of Capitalism. New York: Macmillan, 1924.
- Reasonable Value: A Theory of Volitional Economics Edwards Brothers, 1925
- Institutional Economics. New York: Macmillan, 1934.
- Myself. Madison: University of Wisconsin Press, 1934.

Co-authored works

- Commons, John R. and Andrews, J. B. Principles of Labor Legislation. New York: Harper and Bros., 4th edn 1916. (archive.org; Online
- Commons, John R., et al. History of Labor in the United States. Vols. 1–4. New York: Macmillan, 1918–1935.
- Commons, John R., et al. Industrial Government. New York: Macmillan, 1921.
- Commons, John R.; Parsons, Kenneth H.; and Perlman, Selig. The Economics of Collective Action. New York: Macmillan, 1950.

Edited works

- Commons, John R. (Ed.). Trade Unionism and Labor Problems. Boston: Ginn and Co., 1905.
- Commons, John R. (Ed.). A Documentary History of American Industrial Society. In 10 Volumes. Cleveland, Ohio: Arthur H. Clark Co., 1910.

== See also ==
- EAEPE
- US labor law
- UK labour law
