= Richard T. Ely =

American economist (1854–1943)

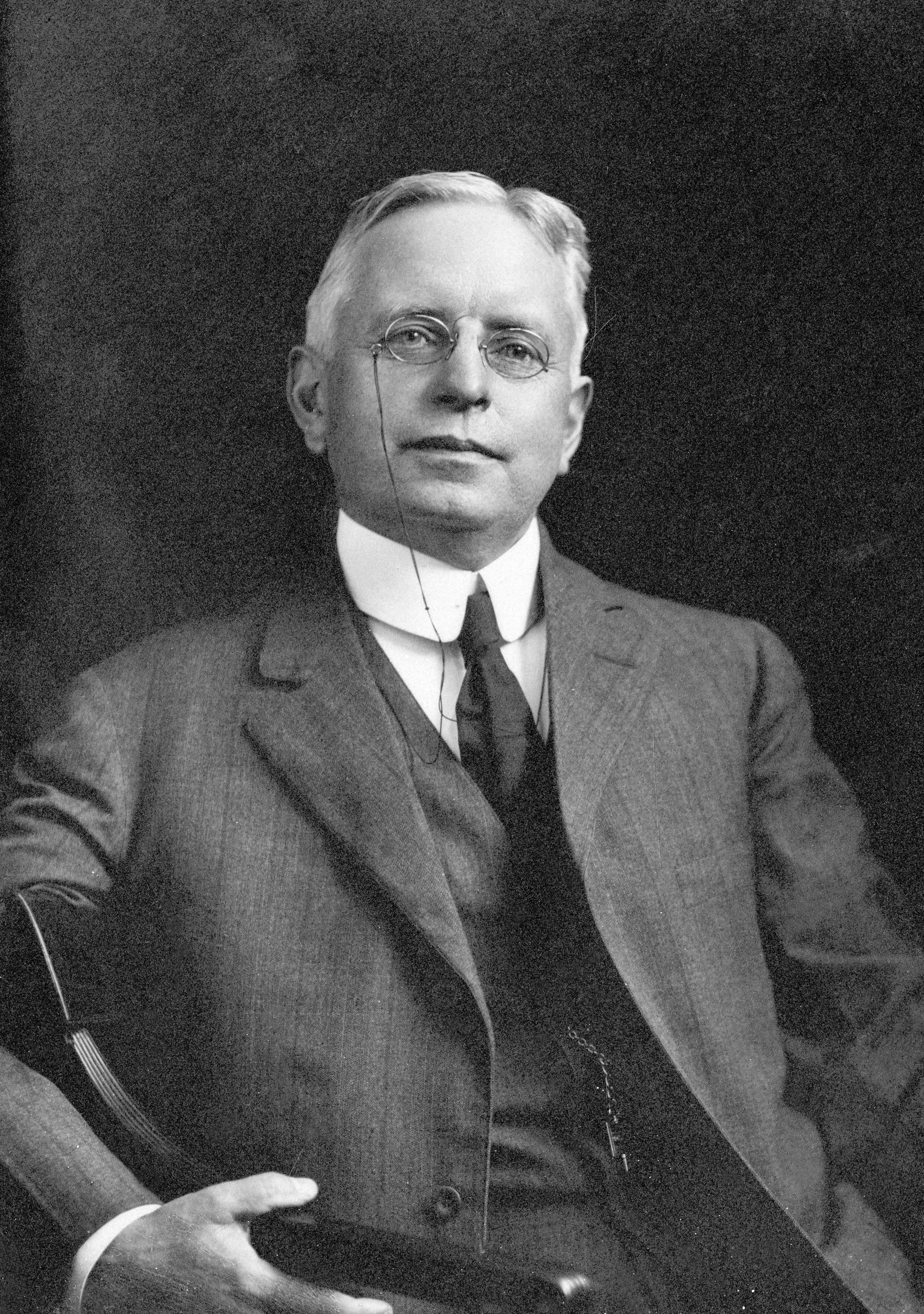
- Ely around 1910, at the University of Wisconsin
- Born: April 13, 1854; Ripley, New York, U.S.
- Died: October 4, 1943 (aged 89); Old Lyme, Connecticut, U.S.
- Resting place: Forest Hill Cemetery

Academic background
- Education: Columbia University; Heidelberg University
- Doctoral advisor: Karl Knies
- Other advisor: Johann Bluntschli

Academic work
- Discipline: Political economy
- Institutions: Johns Hopkins University; University of Wisconsin–Madison; Northwestern University
- Doctoral students: Lewis Henry Haney; Alvin Hansen; Edward Alsworth Ross; William A. Scott; Sidney Sherwood; Allyn Abbott Young; David Kinley
- Notable students: John R. Commons; Woodrow Wilson

Richard Theodore Ely (April 13, 1854 – October 4, 1943) was an American economist, author, and leader of the Progressive movement who called for more government intervention to reform what it saw as the injustices of capitalism, especially regarding factory conditions, compulsory education, child labor, and labor unions.

Ely is best remembered as a founder and the first Secretary of the American Economic Association, as a founder and secretary of the Christian Social Union, and as the author of a series of widely read books on the organized labor movement, socialism, and other social issues. He also promoted views on eugenics, redlining, and race suicide.

== Biography ==
=== Early years ===
Ely was born in 1854 in Ripley, New York, the oldest child of Ezra Sterling and Harriet Gardner (Mason) Ely. He grew up on his family's 90-acre farm near Fredonia, New York, carrying wood, milking cows, churning butter, and picking rock in the fields. He later recalled that life on the farm taught him much. Richard's father was a self-taught engineer, and young Richard helped him lay out a railroad in Pennsylvania. But Richard's father was not a successful farmer, relying too much on questionable ideas from popular farm magazines rather than local experience. Fluctuating prices further complicated farming.

Richard's father was a devout Presbyterian who avoided tobacco, allowed no work or play on Sunday, and refused to grow hops because they would have been used to make beer. Yet he read poetry and studied Latin. Ely's mother painted and taught art in the local teachers' college. Ely transferred his affiliation to the Episcopal Church in college, and through his life remained devout and active.

=== Education and career ===
Ely attended Columbia University in New York City, from which he received a bachelor's degree in 1876 and a master's degree in 1879. The same year, he received a Doctor of Philosophy degree in economics from the University of Heidelberg, where he studied with Karl Knies, who belonged to the historical school of economics, and Johann Kaspar Bluntschli. He also received a Doctorate of Laws from Hobart College in 1892.

Ely was a professor and head of the political economy department at Johns Hopkins University from 1881 to 1892.

In 1885, Ely was a founder of the American Economic Association, serving until 1892 as the group's Secretary. He also served a term as president of the organization from 1899 to 1901. The AEA Distinguished Lecture series was formerly known as the Richard T. Ely Lecture; it was renamed in 2020. Ely also founded Lambda Alpha International in 1930. Its purposes included the encouragement of the study of land economics at universities; the promotion of a closer affiliation between its members and the professional world of land economics; and the furtherance of the highest ideals of scholarship and honesty in business and the universities. Ely is known as the "Father of Land Economics".

In April 1891, Ely was a founder and the first Secretary of the Christian Social Union, a membership organization advocating the application of Christian principles to social problems.

From 1892 until 1925, he was professor of Political Economy and director of the School of Economics, Political Science, and History at the University of Wisconsin–Madison. In 1894, Oliver Elwin Wells, Superintendent of Public Instruction of Wisconsin and ex officio member of the University's Board of Regents, attempted to expel Ely from his chair at Wisconsin for purportedly teaching socialistic doctrines. This effort failed, with the Wisconsin state Board of Regents issuing a ringing proclamation in favor of academic freedom, acknowledging the necessity of freely "sifting and winnowing" competing claims.

In 1906, Ely co-founded the American Association for Labor Legislation (AALL) with other economists.

In 1925, Ely moved to Northwestern University in Chicago, where he accepted a position as professor of economics. He remained at Northwestern until retiring in 1933.

=== Political views ===
Although regarded as a radical by his detractors on the political right, Ely in fact opposed socialism. "I condemn alike," he declared, "that individualism that would allow the state no room for industrial activity, and that socialism which would absorb in the state the functions of the individual." He argued that socialism was not needed, and "the alternative of socialism is our complex socio-economic order, which is based, in the main, upon private property." He warned that the proper "balance between private and public enterprise" is "menaced by socialism, on the one hand, and by plutocracy, on the other."

Ely's critique of socialism made him a political target of the socialists themselves. In his 1910 book Ten Blind Leaders of the Blind, Arthur Morrow Lewis acknowledged that Ely was a "fair opponent" who had "done much to obtain a hearing for [socialism] among the unreasonable", but charged he was merely one of those "bourgeois intellectuals" who were "not sufficiently intellectual to grasp the nature of our position."

Ely was a product of the German historical school with an emphasis on evolution to new forms, and never accepted the marginalist revolution that was transforming economic theory in Britain and the U.S. He was strongly influenced by Herbert Spencer and strongly favored competition over monopoly or state ownership, with regulation to "secure its benefits" and "mitigate its evils". What was needed was "to raise its moral and ethical level." But whereas Spencer believed that free competition was best served by deregulation and a smaller state, Ely believed that more regulation and a more interventionist state was the policy to follow. Also on social Darwinism, Spencer believed that the state should not get involved in supporting one ethnic group over another, while Ely believe the state should support white "Nordic" people against people of other races (in line with the opinions of his colleagues at the University of Wisconsin, Edward Alsworth Ross and Charles R. Van Hise).

Ely favored eugenics, arguing the "unfit" should be kept from reproducing. He argued that blacks were "for the most part grownup children, and should be treated as such." Ely was an advocate for redlining (which entails racial segregation and discrimination in real estate), and has been considered influential in the institutionalization of redlining practices in the United States.

Ely did support labor unions and opposed child labor, as did many leaders of the Progressive Movement, and also some conservatives, such as Mark Hanna. Ely was close to the Social Gospel movement, emphasizing that the Gospel of Christ applied to society as a whole, not merely individuals; he worked hard to convince churches to advocate on behalf of workers. Ely strongly influenced his friend Walter Rauschenbusch, a leading spokesman for the Social Gospel.

During World War I, Ely worked to build popular support for the American war effort, taking part in the activities of the League to Enforce Peace. He headed the committee of arrangements for a "Win the War Convention" held in Madison on November 8–10, 1918. Ely's political activities during World War I included his campaign against Senator Robert M. La Follette. Though a Progressive, La Follette did not support the war, and so Ely regarded him as unfit for office. Ely tried to have him removed from the United States Senate and end his influence in Wisconsin politics.

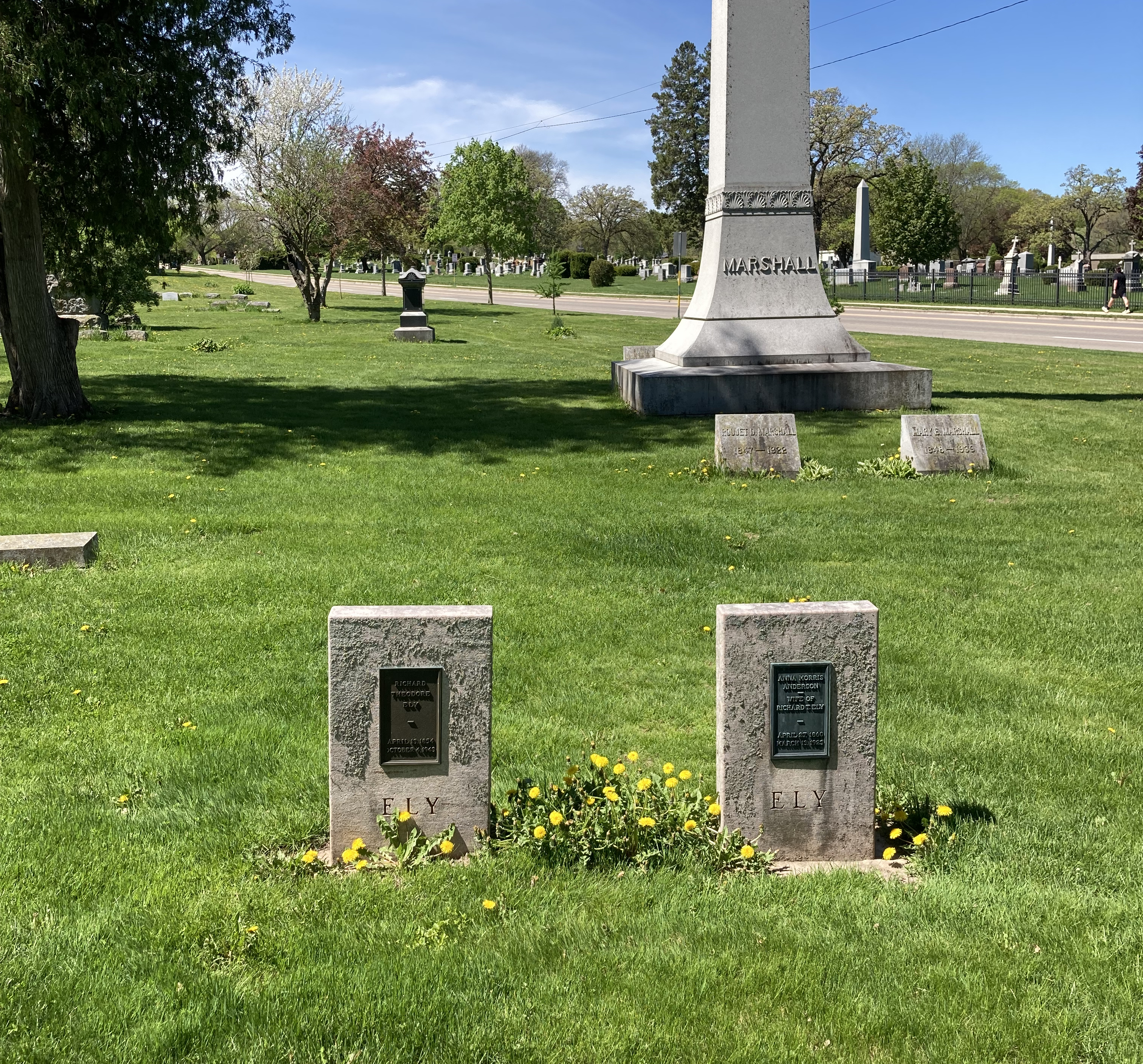
Ely's grave (left) at Forest Hill Cemetery

Ely edited Macmillan's Citizen's Library of Economics, Politics, and Sociology and Social Science Textbook Series and Crowell's Library of Economics and Politics. He was a frequent contributor to periodical literature, both scientific and popular.

=== Death and legacy ===
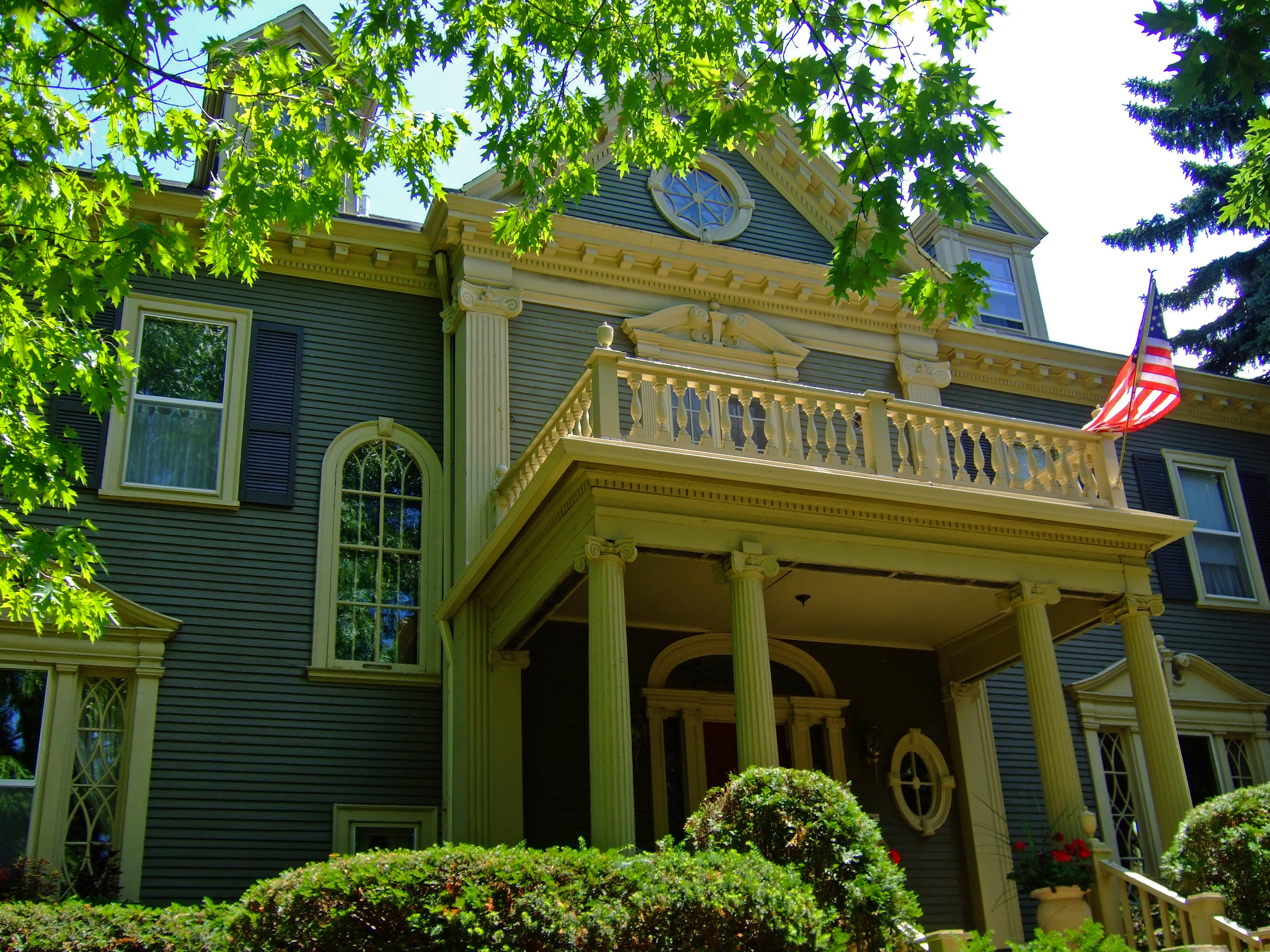
The Richard T. Ely House in Madison, Wisconsin

Richard Ely died in Old Lyme, Connecticut, on October 4, 1943, and was buried at Forest Hill Cemetery in Madison. A large portion of his library was purchased by Louisiana State University and is now a part of LSU's Special Collections division. Ely's papers are housed at the Wisconsin Historical Society.

The American Economic Association instituted the annual "Richard T. Ely Lecture" in 1960 in his memory, which, unlike the Association's other honors, is open to non-American economists. It was renamed the AEA Distinguished Lecture series in 2020.

His former home, now known as the Richard T. Ely House, is on the National Register of Historic Places.

The television series Profiles in Courage did an episode in 1964 titled "Richard T. Ely" about the "sifting and winnowing" incident. Ely was played by Dan O'Herlihy; Wells by Edward Asner; and Ely's attorney, former Congressman Burr Jones, by Leonard Nimoy.

== Works ==
- French and German Socialism in Modern Times. New York: Harper & Brothers, 1883.
- The Past and Present of Political Economy. (contributor) Baltimore, MD: Johns Hopkins University, 1884.
- Recent American Socialism. Baltimore, MD: Johns Hopkins University, 1885.
- The Labor Movement in America. New York: Thomas Y. Crowell & Co., 1886.
- Taxation in American States and Cities. New York: Thomas Y. Crowell & Co., 1888.
- Problems of Today: A Discussion of Protective Tariffs, Taxation, and Monopolies. (1888). Revised and enlarged edition. New York: Thomas Y. Crowell & Co., 1890.
- An Introduction to Political Economy. New York: Chautauqua Press, 1889.
- Social Aspects of Christianity, and Other Essays. New York: Thomas Y. Crowell & Co., 1889.
- The Universities and the Churches: An Address Delivered at the 31st University Convocation, State Chamber, Albany, New York, July 5, 1893. Albany: State University of New York, 1893.
- Outlines of Economics. New York: Flood and Vincent, 1893.
- Socialism: An Examination of Its Nature, Its Strength and Its Weakness. (1894) New York: Thomas Y. Crowell & Co., 1895. —Reissued as The Strength and Weakness of Socialism.
- The Social Law of Service. New York: Eaton and Mains, 1896.
- Monopolies and Trusts. New York: Macmillan, 1900.
- The Coming City. New York: Thomas Y, Crowell & Co., 1902.
- Studies in the Evolution of Industrial Society. New York: Macmillan, 1903.
- Elementary Principles of Economics: Together with a Short Sketch of Economic History. With G.R. Wicker. New York: Macmillan, 1904.
- Property and Contract in their Relation to the Distribution of Wealth. In two volumes. New York: Macmillan, 1914. Volume 1 | Volume 2.
- "Private Colonization of Land," offprint from American Economic Review. Madison, WI: Office of the Secretary of the American Association of Agricultural Legislation, Sept. 1918.
- Elements of Land Economics. With Edward Ward Morehouse. New York: Macmillan, 1924.
- Hard Times: The Way In and the Way Out: With a Special Consideration of the "Seen and the Unseen." New York: Macmillan, 1932.
- The Great Change: Work and Wealth in the New Age. With Frank Bohn. New York: Thomas Nelson and Sons, 1935.
- Ground Under Our Feet: An Autobiography. New York: Macmillan, 1938.
- Land Economics. With G.S. Wehrwein. New York: Macmillan, 1941.

== See also ==
- Social democracy
