= Oliver Elwin Wells =

American educator (1853–1922)

14th Superintendent of Public Instruction of Wisconsin
- In office January 5, 1891 – January 7, 1895
- Preceded by: Jesse B. Thayer
- Succeeded by: John Q. Emery

Personal details
- Born: July 2, 1853 Lamartine, Wisconsin, U.S.
- Died: December 26, 1922 (aged 69) Wausau, Wisconsin, U.S.
- Party: Democratic
- Education: University of Chicago
- Occupation: Educator

Oliver Elwin Wells (July 2, 1853 – December 26, 1922) was an American educator.

Born in Lamartine, Wisconsin, Wells lived in Vermont from 1858 to 1862, but moved back to Fond du Lac County, Wisconsin; Wells attended the University of Chicago, but did not graduate. He moved to Waupaca County, Wisconsin where he was principal of a school in Manawa, Wisconsin and then moved to Appleton, Wisconsin, where he was a superintendent of public schools. Then he moved to Wausau, Wisconsin, where he help set up the Wausau Normal School. He served as the Wisconsin Superintendent of Public Instruction from 1891 to 1895. Wells died in Wausau and was buried in Manawa.

== Sifting and winnowing incident ==
In 1894, Wells, as an ex officio member of the University of Wisconsin Board of Regents, attempted to have Richard T. Ely, professor of political economy and director of the School of Economics, Political Science, and History at the University of Wisconsin, expelled from his position at Wisconsin for purportedly teaching socialistic doctrines. This effort failed, with the state Board of Regents issuing a ringing proclamation in favor of academic freedom, acknowledging the necessity for freely "sifting and winnowing" among competing claims of truth. The television series Profiles in Courage did an episode in 1964 titled "Richard T. Ely" about the controversy. Wells was played by Edward Asner.
