= Willy Moog =

German philosopher

Willy Moog (also: Wilhelm or Willi Moog; 22 January 1888 in Neuengronau (community of Sinntal) – 24 October 1935 in Braunschweig) was a German philosopher and educator.

== Life ==
Willy Moog studied from 1906 to 1909 in Berlin, Munich and Gießen; his primary areas of focus were Germanic Studies and Philosophy. He was inspired by the Berlin lectures of Georg Simmel and studied Neo-Kantianism with the school around Wilhelm Dilthey. 1915-1918 he served, against his will, as soldier in World War I, at a customs office at the Prussian-Polish-Russian border. In 1919, Moog married Mathilde Buss (1884-1958), an artist, painter, and lyricist. The couple had one daughter, Marianne Moog-Hoff (1921-1999), who during World War II emigrated to Oslo, Norway and married a Norwegian.

In the early 1930s, Moog faced severe problems with the Nazi government, who ruled the federal state of Braunschweig, impersonated by president Dietrich Klagges, before Adolf Hitler came into power. He committed suicide in the fall of 1935.

== Career ==
In 1909, he wrote a dissertation on the psychology of literature under the supervision of Karl Groos at the Universität Gießen, entitled "Natur und Ich in Goethes Lyrik" (Nature and I in Goethe's lyrics). During the First World War, Moog published his first book Kant's views on Peace and War (1917). He was a fervent pacifist. In 1919, he accomplished his habilitation at Universität Greifswald with the book on Logik, Psychologie und Psychologismus, a then well-known classic on the interdisciplinary debates of psychologism. In Greifswald, he also learned about the philosophy of William James through one of his peers, Johannes Rehmke.

In 1924, Moog became Full Professor of Philosophy, Pedagogics, and Psychology at Braunschweig University of Technology. From 1927 to 1930, he was Dean of the Faculty of Cultural Studies. In 1930, his renowned book Hegel und die Hegelsche Schule was published and received international attention. It was translated into Spanish by José Gaos in 1931. Moog extensively contributed to the history of philosophy, on which he wrote two textbooks, allied by a two-volume set on the History of Pedagogics (Vol. I, 1927; Vol. II 1933, 9th ed. 1991). With the help of Max Frischeisen-Köhler, the co-edited Volume III of Friedrich Ueberweg Grundriß der Geschichte der Philosophie (on early modern philosophy), appeared in 1924. Moog was well connected to the philosophers of his time, among them Moritz Schlick, Ernst Cassirer, Arthur Liebert, Helmuth Plessner, Heinrich Scholz, and Max Wentscher.

== Legacy ==
A long-term research project on Moog is located at the philosophy department of Technischen Universität Braunschweig The first biography on Moog, written by philosopher Nicole C. Karafyllis, has been published in January 2015, at the German Karl Alber Verlag in Freiburg. During her biographical research, she found out that Willy Moog's relatives are directly related to the US-American pioneer of synthesizer Robert Moog (whose grandfather came from the region around Marburg in Germany).

== Selected works ==
- Natur und Ich in Goethes Lyrik (Dissertationsschrift, Darmstadt 1909)
- Kants Ansichten über Krieg und Frieden (Darmstadt 1917)
- Logik, Psychologie und Psychologismus (Habilitationsschrift) (1919), Leipzig: Niemeyer 1920.
- Philosophie (Gotha 1921, series: Wissenschaftliche Forschungsberichte, ed. by Karl Hönn)
- Philosophische und pädagogische Strömungen der Gegenwart in ihrem Zusammenhang (1926)
- Geschichte der Pädagogik in 3 Bänden (1928 - 1933, nur Bd. 2 und 3 erschienen)
- Hegel und die Hegelsche Schule (1930), Spanish translation 1931 by José Gaos (Madrid, Revista de occidente)
- Das Leben der Philosophen (1932)
- Die Pädagogik der Neuzeit vom 18. Jahrhundert bis zur Gegenwart (two of three volumes publ. 1927–1933)

== Sources ==
- Nicole C. Karafyllis: Willy Moog (1888-1935): Ein Philosophenleben. Freiburg: Karl Alber (2015). ISBN 978-3495486979
- Uwe Lammers: "Zurück in die Welt der Lebenden. Das faszinierende, unbekannte Leben des Philosophen Willy Moog", in: Bergwinkel-Bote 56. Heimatbuch des Kreises Schlüchtern (2004)
- Helmut Schneider (1997). "Moog, Willy (Wilhelm)". Neue Deutsche Biographie (in German). Vol. 18. Berlin: Duncker & Humblot. pp. 67–68. (full text online).
