= Methodenstreit =

Economics controversy

Methodenstreit (German for "method dispute"), in intellectual history beyond German-language discourse, was an economics controversy commenced in the 1880s and persisting for more than a decade, between that field's Austrian School and the (German) Historical School. The debate concerned the place of general theory in social science and the use of history in explaining the dynamics of human action. It also touched on policy and political issues, including the roles of the individual and state. Nevertheless, methodological concerns were uppermost and some early members of the Austrian School also defended a form of welfare state, as prominently advocated by the Historical School.

When the debate opened, Carl Menger developed the Austrian School's standpoint, and Gustav von Schmoller defended the approach of the Historical School.

(In German-speaking countries, the original of this Germanism is not specific to the one controversy, which is likely to be specified as Methodenstreit der Nationalökonomie, i.e. "Methodenstreit of national economics".)

== History ==
=== Background ===
The Historical School contended that economists could develop new and better social laws from the collection and study of statistics and historical materials, and distrusted theories not derived from historical experience. Thus, the German Historical School focused on specific dynamic institutions as the largest variable in changes in political economy. The Historical School were themselves reacting against materialist determinism, the idea that human action could, and would (once science advanced enough), be explained as physical and chemical reactions.

The Austrian School, beginning with the work of Carl Menger in the 1860s, argued against this (in Grundsätze der Volkswirtschaftslehre, English title: Principles of Economics), that economics was the work of philosophical logic and could only ever be about developing rules from first principles—seeing human motives and social interaction as far too complex to be amenable to statistical analysis—and purporting to deduce universally valid precepts from human actions.

=== Menger and the German Historical School ===
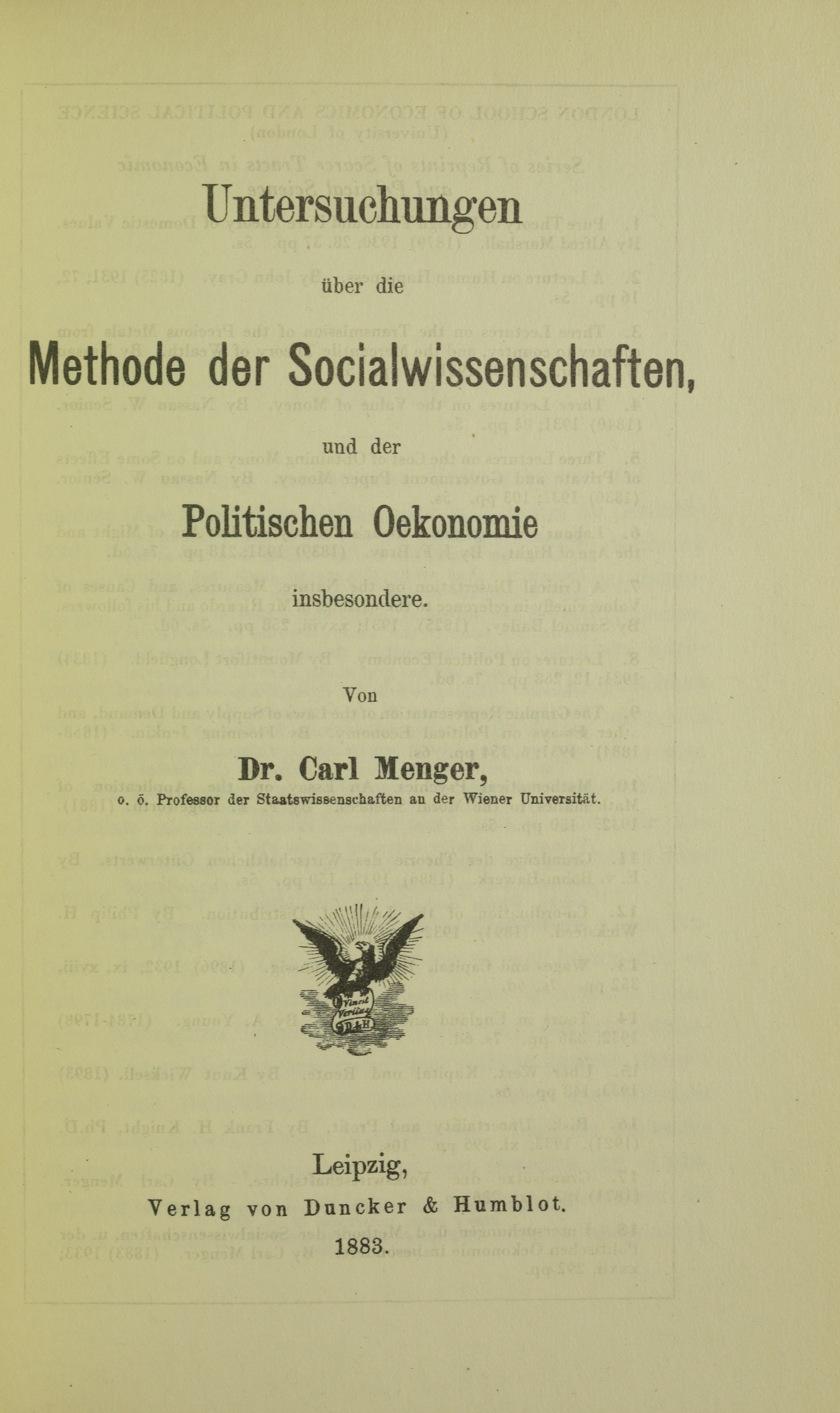
Untersuchungen über die Methode der Socialwissenschaften, und der politischen Ökonomie insbesondere, 1933

The first move was when Carl Menger attacked Schmoller and the German Historical School, in his 1883 book Investigations into the Method of the Social Sciences, with Special Reference to Political Economics (Untersuchungen über die Methode der Socialwissenschaften, und der politischen Ökonomie insbesondere). Menger thought the best method of studying economics was through reason and finding general theories which applied to broad areas. Menger, as did the other Austrians, concentrated upon the subjective, atomistic nature of economics. He argued that the foundations for economics were built upon assumption of self-interest, evaluation on the margin, and incomplete knowledge. He said aggregative, collective ideas could not have adequate foundation unless they rested upon individual components.

The direct attack on the German Historical School lead Schmoller to respond quickly with an unfavourable and quite hostile review of Menger's book. Menger accepted the challenge and replied in a passionate pamphlet, written in the form of letters to a friend, in which he (according to Hayek) "ruthlessly demolished Schmoller's position". The encounter between the masters was soon imitated by their disciples. A degree of hostility not often equaled in scientific controversy developed.

== Consequences ==
The term "Austrian school of economics" came into existence as a result of the Methodenstreit, when Schmoller used it in an unfavourable review of one of Menger's later books, intending to convey an impression of backwardness and obscurantism of Austria compared to the more modern Prussians. A serious consequence of the hostile debate was that Schmoller went so far as to declare publicly that members of the "abstract" school were unfit to fill a teaching position in a German university, and his influence was quite sufficient to make this equivalent to a complete exclusion of all adherents to Menger's doctrines from academic positions in Germany. The result was that even thirty years after the close of the controversy Germany was still less affected by the new ideas now spreading elsewhere, than any other academically important country in the world.

== See also ==
- Economic methodology
- Philosophy of mathematics
- Philosophy of science
- Positive economics
- Unreasonable ineffectiveness of mathematics
- Positivismusstreit
- Werturteilsstreit
