= Wentscher =

Wentscher is a surname. Notable people with the surname include:

- Max Wentscher (1862–1942), German philosopher
- Tina Haim-Wentscher (1887–1974), German-Australian sculptress, also known as Tina Wentcher
