= Davos University Conferences =

Effort to create an international university (1928–1931)

- Cours universitaires de Davos; Davoser Hochschulkurse
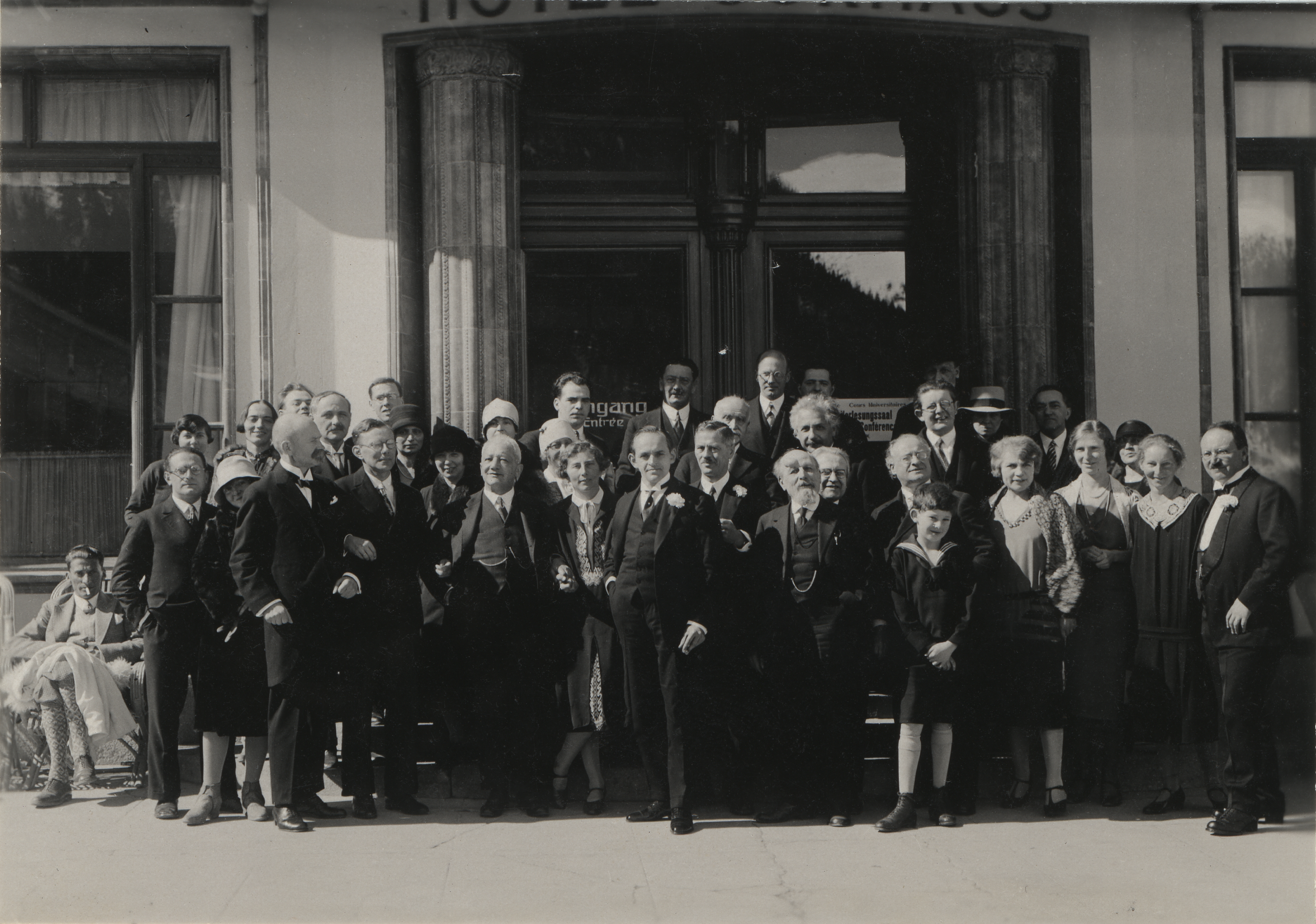
- March 1928
- Formation: August 1927
- Dissolved: January 1933
- Type: Academic conferences
- Location: Davos, Switzerland
- Official language: French, German, English
- Leader: Gottfried Salomon
- Key people: Albert Einstein, Martin Heidegger, Léon Brunschvicg, Ernst Cassirer

The Davos University Conferences (French: Cours universitaires de Davos; German: Davoser Hochschulkurse) were a project between 1928 and 1931 to create an international university at Davos in Switzerland.

== Origins ==
The Davos University Conferences owed their creation to two complementary initiatives, one local and one international.

=== Local initiative ===
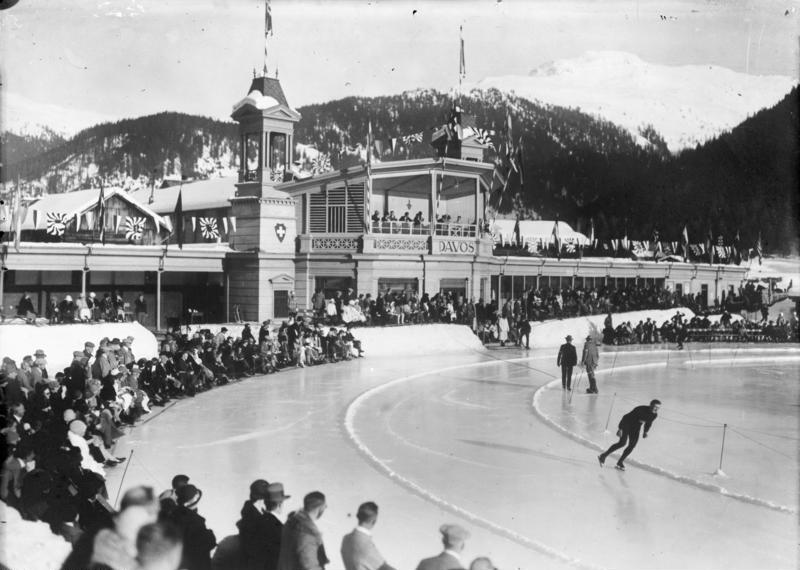
Davos in 1932. Together with the university courses, sporting competitions demonstrated the locals' desire to diversify from purely medical courses

Noting the large number of tubercular students who came to Davos, as a mountain town known for its cosmopolitan atmosphere and as a luxurious place to convalesce, between 1926 and 1927 a committee was formed by the local doctors to formulate a diversification project for Davos University.

=== International initiative ===
The Davos project coincided with warming international relations, particularly between France and the Weimar Republic (Germany) after the Locarno Pact of 1925. The French intelligentsia wholeheartedly participated in projects of the International Committee on Intellectual Cooperation, but the Germans, who were excluded from it by the Treaty of Versailles, instead founded the Deutsch-französische Gesellschaft (DFG, "German-French Society"). German intellectuals who wanted to participate in international academic conferences approached the Davos initiators and redefined their university project to become an annual conference.

== Organisation ==
A committee made up of local and visiting academics was assembled under the chairmanship of Dr Paul Müller (instigator of the Spengler coup in 1923), the sociologist Gottfried Salomon (1892 – 1964), president of the Frankfurt DFG, and Erhard Branger (1881 – 1958), mayor of Davos, who made it their mission to invite élite European intellectuals to Davos for weeks of work and exchange of ideas. The committee was augmented in 1929 by three national committees (German, French and Swiss).

== Establishment ==
For four consecutive years, between 1928 and 1931, the committee convened a large number of important intellectuals, mainly German and French, for conferences (in both languages) lasting three weeks at the end of winter. These academics were accompanied by promising students in a programme of communautés de travail ("Work communities") and as well as the conferences themselves there were opportunities to get to know academics from other countries who were working in the same field.

== Conferences ==
=== 1928 ===
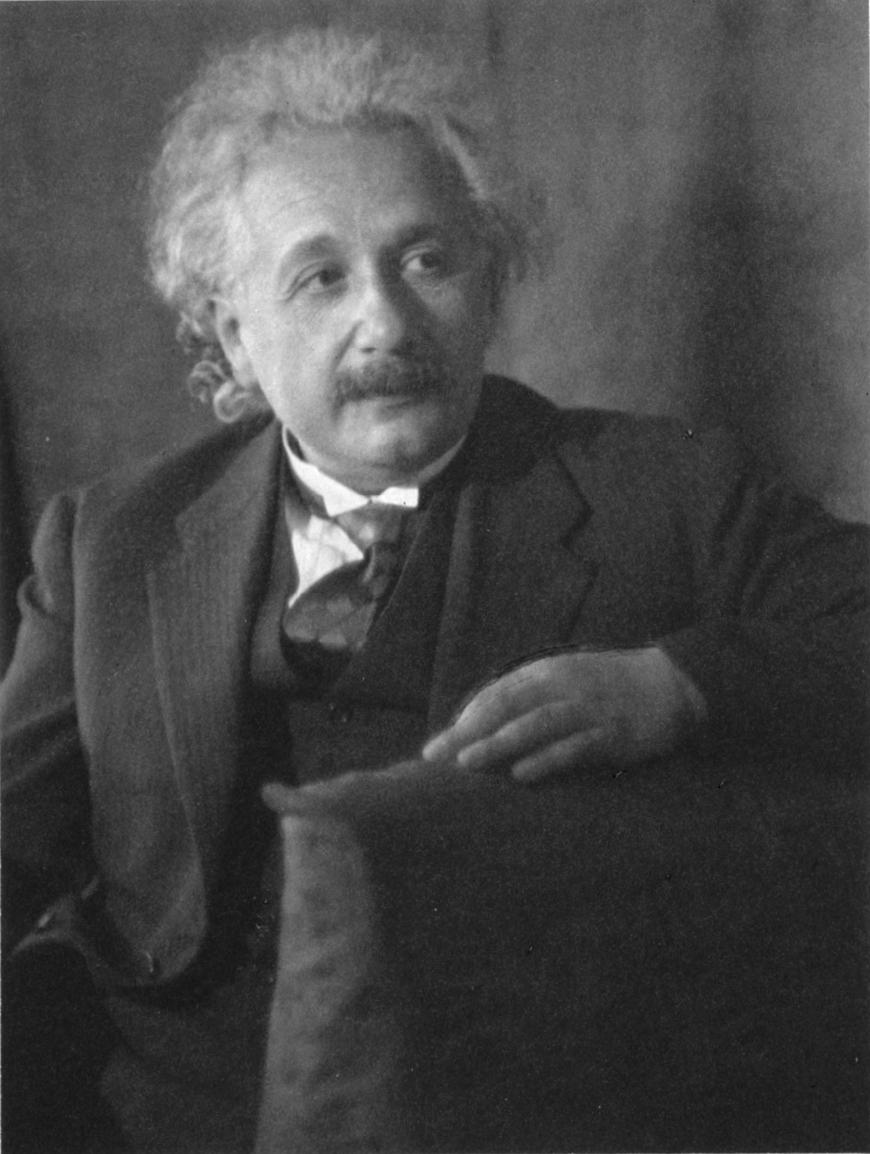
Albert Einstein (1931 photo), whose attendance brought fame to the first conference

The first Conference was opened by Erhard Branger (mayor of Davos), Lucien Lévy-Bruhl (French philosopher and sociologist), Hans Driesch (German philosopher) and Albert Einstein.

==== Presenters ====
- (France) Fernand Baldensperger
- (France) Charles Blondel
- (France) Célestin Bouglé
- (France) Yves de La Brière
- (Netherlands) Christian Cornélissen
- (France) Georges Davy
- (France) Paul Desjardins
- (Germany) Hans Driesch
- (Germany) / (Switzerland) Albert Einstein
- (Germany) Adhemar Gelb
- (France) Edmond Goblot
- (Germany) Friedrich von Gottl-Ottlilienfeld
- (Germany) Eberhard Grisebach
- (Switzerland) Paul Häberlin
- (France) Henri Hauser
- (Austria) Friedrich Hertz
- (Germany) Paul Kluckhohn
- (France) Lucien Lévy-Bruhl
- (Germany) Hans Lewald
- (Germany) Arthur Liebert
- (Germany) Theodor Litt
- (France) Marcel Mauss
- (Switzerland) Fritz Medicus
- (Germany) Albrecht Mendelssohn-Bartholdy
- (Germany) Hans Naumann
- (Germany) Franz Oppenheimer
- (Switzerland) Jean Piaget
- (France) Roger Picard
- (France) Henri Piéron
- (Austria) Karl Přibram
- (Germany) Erich Przywara
- (Germany) Gustav Radbruch
- (France) / (Switzerland) Albert Thibaudet
- (Germany) Paul Tillich
- (Germany) / (Italy) Robert Michels

=== 1929 ===
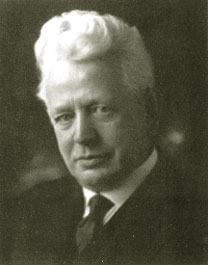
The second conference (1928) is mainly documented in philosophical letters, because of the presence of Ernst Cassirer (below) and Martin Heidegger

The second conference was opened by Giuseppe Motta (Federal Council). It was noted for the "Cassirer–Heidegger debate" between Martin Heidegger and Ernst Cassirer.

==== Presenters ====
- (Germany) Willy Andreas
- (France) Léon Brunschvicg
- (Italy) Armando Carlini
- (France) Jean-Marie Carré
- (Germany) Ernst Cassirer
- (Germany) Martin Heidegger
- (Germany) Karl Joël
- (France) Albert Pauphilet
- (Germany) Wilhelm Pinder
- (Germany) Erich Przywara
- (Switzerland) Gonzague de Reynold
- (Germany) Kurt Riezler
- (Germany) Ferdinand Sauerbruch
- (France) Henri Tronchon
- (Germany) Eduard Wechssler

==== Students ====
- Rudolf Carnap
- Jean Cavaillès
- Norbert Elias
- Emmanuel Lévinas
- Karl Mannheim
- Léo Strauss

=== 1930 ===
The third conference was opened by Federal Councillor Heinrich Häberlin. It was the first conference to be conducted partly in English.

==== Presenters ====
- (France) Jacques Ancel
- (Belgium) Maurice Ansiaux
- (Germany) Arthur Baumgarten
- (France) Maurice Baumont
- (Italy) Guido Bortolotto
- (France) Laurent Dechesne
- (France) Lucien Febvre
- (France) Maurice Halbwachs
- (Germany) Hermann Kantorowicz
- (Belgium) Hendrik de Man
- (Switzerland) William Martin
- (Switzerland) Edgard Milhaud
- (Germany) Leo Polak
- (Germany) Karl Rothenbücher
- (France) Georges Scelle
- (Germany) Werner Sombart
- (Germany) Alfred Weber
- (Germany) Leopold von Wiese
- (France) Alfred Zimmern

=== 1931 ===
==== Presenters ====
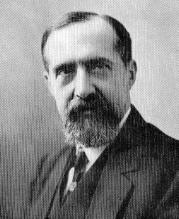
André Honnorat, whose 1931 conference at the Cité internationale universitaire de Paris was of great interest because of its similarities

The fourth conference was opened by Carl Heinrich Becker (lately the Prussian Minister of Culture).

- (Germany) Gertrud Bäumer
- (Italy) Guido Bortolotto
- (Switzerland) Pierre Bovet
- (France) Marcel Déat
- (Germany) Wilhelm Flitner
- (Germany) Hans Freyer
- (France) Georges Gastinel
- (Switzerland) Siegfried Giedion
- (France) Jean Guéhenno
- (Switzerland) Paul Häberlin
- (Germany) Otto Hoetzsch
- (France) André Honnorat
- (France) Maurice Lacroix
- (France) Paul Langevin
- (Germany) Adolf Löwe
- (France) Hippolyte Luc
- (France) Ignace Meyerson
- (Germany) Ernst Michel

== Disestablishment ==
The 1932 conference could not be held because of the Great Depression. Adolf Hitler's ascension and granting of absolute power on 30 January 1933, led to the exile of many German intellectuals and put an end to Franco-German co-operation in science, which made it impossible to continue the conferences.

== See also ==
- Conference on the Epistemology of the Exact Sciences
