= Continental Divide: Heidegger, Cassirer, Davos =

2010 book by Peter Gordon

- Cover of the first edition
- Author: Peter Gordon
- Language: English
- Subject: Continental philosophy
- Publisher: Harvard University Press
- Publication date: 2010
- Publication place: United States
- Media type: Print (hardcover and paperback)
- Pages: 448
- ISBN: 978-0-674-06417-1

Continental Divide: Heidegger, Cassirer, Davos is a 2010 book by Peter Gordon, in which the author reconstructs the famous 1929 debate between Martin Heidegger and Ernst Cassirer at Davos, Switzerland, demonstrating its significance as a point of rupture in Continental thought that implicated all the major philosophical movements of the day. Continental Divide was awarded the Jacques Barzun Prize from the American Philosophical Society in 2010.
