= Peter Gordon (historian) =

American historian of philosophy (born 1966)

- Born: Peter Eli Gordon; 1966 (age 59–60); Seattle, Washington, US
- Other name: Peter E. Gordon

Academic background
- Education: Reed College; University of California, Berkeley
- Thesis: Under One Tradewind (1997)
- Doctoral advisor: Martin Jay

Academic work
- Discipline: History
- Sub-discipline: Intellectual history
- Institutions: Harvard University
- Main interests: Martin Heidegger; interwar continental philosophy; secularization
- Notable works: Continental Divide (2010)

Peter Eli Gordon (born 1966) is an American historian of philosophy, and a critical theorist. The Amabel B. James Professor of History and Faculty Affiliate in the Department of Philosophy at Harvard University, Gordon focuses on continental philosophy and modern German and French thought, with particular emphasis on the German philosophers Theodor Adorno and Martin Heidegger, critical theory, continental philosophy during the interwar crisis, and most recently, secularization and social thought in the 20th century.

== Early life ==
Born in Seattle, Washington, in 1966, Peter Gordon was the son of Sunnie and Milton Gordon, a biochemist who attended University of Minnesota and the University of Illinois, earning his Doctor of Philosophy (PhD) degree at 23 and joining the faculty at the University of Washington in 1959, focusing on plant genetics. Peter Gordon received his Bachelor of Arts degree from Reed College (1988) after a stint at the University of Chicago. He studied with Martin Jay at University of California, Berkeley, from which he received his PhD degree (1997).

== Career ==
Gordon spent two years (1998–2000) at the Society of Fellows in the Liberal Arts at Princeton University before joining the faculty at Harvard in 2000. In 2006 he became a member of Harvard's permanent faculty, and in 2005 he received the Phi Beta Kappa Award for Excellence in Teaching.

Gordon's first book, Rosenzweig and Heidegger: Between Judaism and German Philosophy (University of California Press, 2003), about Martin Heidegger and the German-Jewish philosopher Franz Rosenzweig, won the Salo W. Baron Prize from the Academy for Jewish Research for Best First Book, the Goldstein-Goren Prize for Best Book in Jewish Philosophy, and the Morris D. Forkosch Prize from the Journal of the History of Ideas for Best Book in Intellectual History.

In Continental Divide: Heidegger, Cassirer, Davos (Harvard University Press, 2010), Gordon reconstructs the 1929 debate between Heidegger and Ernst Cassirer at Davos, Switzerland, demonstrating its significance as a point of rupture in Continental thought that implicated all the major philosophical movements of the day. Continental Divide was awarded the Jacques Barzun Prize from the American Philosophical Society in 2010.

Gordon's monograph, Adorno and Existence (Harvard University Press, 2016), reinterprets Theodor W. Adorno's philosophy by looking at the critical theorist's encounters with existentialism and phenomenology. The main claim of the book is that Adorno was inspired by the unfulfilled promise of these schools to combat traditional metaphysical thinking, which led to the development of his "negative dialectics".

In the most recent years Gordon has published books such as Migrants in the Profane: Critical Theory and the Question of Seculariation (Yale University Press, 2020) and a major reinterpretation of Adorno's philosophy, A Precarious Happiness: Adorno and the Sources of Normativity (Suhrkamp Verlag, 2023 and the University of Chicago Press, 2024). A Precarious Happiness develops arguments that Gordon first presented in Frankfurt in 2019 for the Adorno Lectures, sponsored by the Institute for Social Research and timed to coincide with the 50th anniversary of Adorno's death. Most recently he published Walter Benjamin: the Pearl Diver (Yale University Press, 2026), which was reviewed in The New Yorker.

Gordon sits on the editorial boards of Constellations, Modern Intellectual History, Journal of the History of Ideas, and New German Critique. He is co-founder and co-chair of the Harvard Colloquium for Intellectual History. Gordon teaches four survey courses on continental philosophy: German Social Thought and French Social Thought, a lecture course on Hegel and Marx, and a lecture course on critical theory.

== Bibliography ==
=== Books ===
- Rosenzweig and Heidegger, Between Judaism and German Philosophy (University of California Press, 2003)
- The Cambridge Companion to Modern Jewish Philosophy (co-editor with Michael Morgan, Cambridge University Press, 2007)
- Continental Divide: Heidegger, Cassirer, Davos (Harvard University Press, 2010)
- Weimar Thought: A Critical History (co-editor with John McCormick, Princeton University Press, 2013)
- Adorno and Existence (Harvard University Press, 2016)
- Authoritarianism (co-authored with Wendy Brown and Max Pensky, University of Chicago Press, 2018)
- Migrants in the Profane: Critical Theory and the Question of Secularization. Yale University Press. 2020. ISBN 9780300250763.
- A Precarious Happiness: Adorno and the Sources of Normativity (University of Chicago Press, 2024)
- Walter Benjamin: The Pearl Diver (Yale University Press, 2026)

=== Journal articles ===
- "Continental Divide: Heidegger and Cassirer at Davos, 1929—An Allegory of Intellectual History," Modern Intellectual History. Vol. I, N. 2, (August, 2004), pp. 1–30.
- “The Concept of the Unpolitical: German Jewish Thought and Weimar Political Theology” Social Research. Special Issue on Hannah Arendt's Centenary Volume 74, Number 3 (Fall 2007)
- “Neo-Kantianism and the Politics of Enlightenment” Philosophical Forum (Spring, 2008)
- “The Place of the Sacred in the Absence of God: Charles Taylor’s A Secular Age” Journal of the History of Ideas Volume 69, Number 4 (October, 2008), pp. 647–673.
- “What Hope Remains?” in The New Republic, December 14, 2011. On Jürgen Habermas, An Awareness of What is Missing: Faith and Reason in a Post-Secularist Age and Judith Butler, Jürgen Habermas, et al., The Power of Religion in the Public Sphere.

=== Chapters ===
- "Science, Realism, and the Unworlding of the World" in The Blackwell Companion to Phenomenology and Existentialism, Mark Wrathall and Hubert Dreyfus, eds. (Blackwell, 2006)
- "Hammer without a Master: French Phenomenology and the Origins of Deconstruction (or, How Derrida read Heidegger)" in Histories of Postmodernism, Mark Bevir, et al., eds. (Routledge, 2007)
- "The Artwork Beyond Itself: Adorno, Beethoven, and Late Style" in The Modernist Imagination: Essays in Intellectual History and Critical Theory in Honor of Martin Jay] (co-editor with Warren Breckman, et al., Berghahn Books, 2008)
