= Vif, Isère =

Vif
- Commune
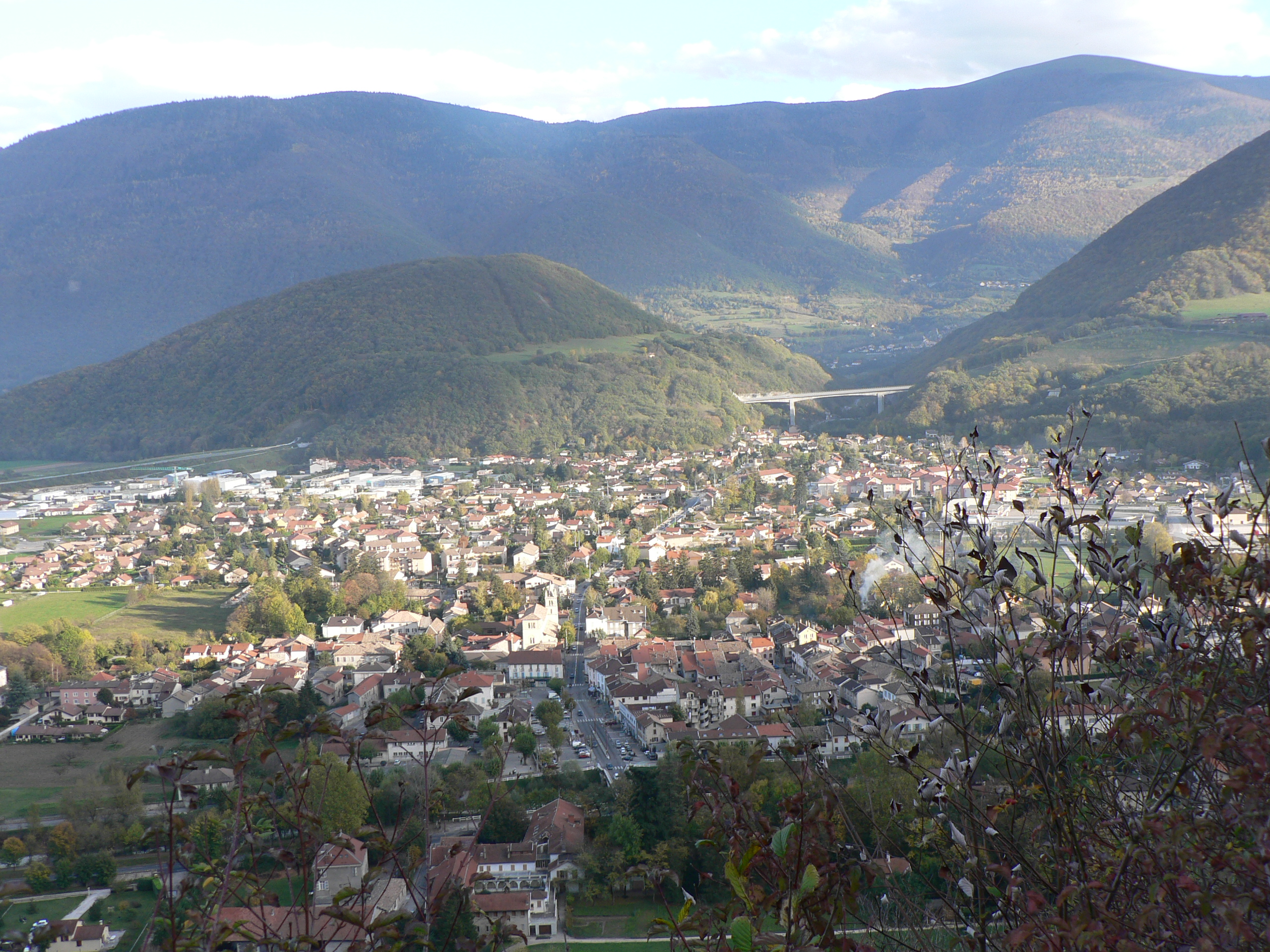
- A general view of Vif

- Coat of arms
- Location of Vif
- Location within France Location within Auvergne-Rhône-Alpes
- Coordinates: 45°03′22″N 5°40′15″E
- Country: France
- Region: Auvergne-Rhône-Alpes
- Department: Isère
- Arrondissement: Grenoble
- Canton: Le Pont-de-Claix
- Intercommunality: Grenoble-Alpes Métropole

Government
  - Mayor (2021–2026): Guy Genet
- Area^{1}: 28.30 km^{2} (10.93 sq mi)
- Elevation: 312 m (1,024 ft)
- Highest elevation: 1,263 m (4,144 ft)
- Lowest elevation: 277 m (909 ft)
- Population (2023): 8,530
  - Density: 301/km^{2} (781/sq mi)
- Time zone: UTC+01:00 (CET)
  - Summer (DST): UTC+02:00 (CEST)
- INSEE/Postal code: 38545 /38450
- ^{1} French Land Register data, which excludes lakes, ponds, glaciers > 1 km^{2} (0.386 sq mi or 247 acres) and river estuaries.

Vif (French pronunciation: [vif]) is a commune in the Isère department in southeastern France.

The town hosts the Champollion Museum, located in the former residence of the Champollion family. Closed for renovations, it reopened in June 2021.

== Geography ==
Vif is situated in the Valley of Gresse, in the south of Grenoble, upon the north-east foothills of the Vercors. The town is crossed by the Gresse river (which come from Gresse-en-Vercors). Vif lies 16 km (10 mi) south of Grenoble, 65 km (40 mi) north-west of Gap and 65 km (40 mi) north-east of Valence.

== Population ==
Historical population

Year	Pop.	±% p.a.
1793	2,055	—
1800	2,021	−0.24%
1806	2,025	+0.03%
1821	2,257	+0.73%
1831	2,282	+0.11%
1836	2,362	+0.69%
1841	2,314	−0.41%
1846	2,426	+0.95%
1851	2,435	+0.07%
1856	2,353	−0.68%
1861	2,417	+0.54%
1866	2,043	−3.31%
1872	2,506	+3.46%
1876	2,925	+3.94%
1881	2,734	−1.34%
1886	2,821	+0.63%
1891	2,792	−0.21%
1896	2,617	−1.29%
1901	2,707	+0.68%

Year	Pop.	±% p.a.
1906	2,589	−0.89%
1911	2,165	−3.51%
1921	2,007	−0.75%
1926	2,134	+1.23%
1931	2,080	−0.51%
1936	2,028	−0.51%
1946	2,071	+0.21%
1954	2,444	+2.09%
1962	3,057	+2.84%
1968	3,287	+1.22%
1975	3,593	+1.28%
1982	4,419	+3.00%
1990	5,788	+3.43%
1999	6,478	+1.26%
2007	8,050	+2.75%
2012	7,975	−0.19%
2017	8,532	+1.36%
2023	8,530	−0.00%

Source: EHESS and INSEE (1968-2023)

== Sights ==
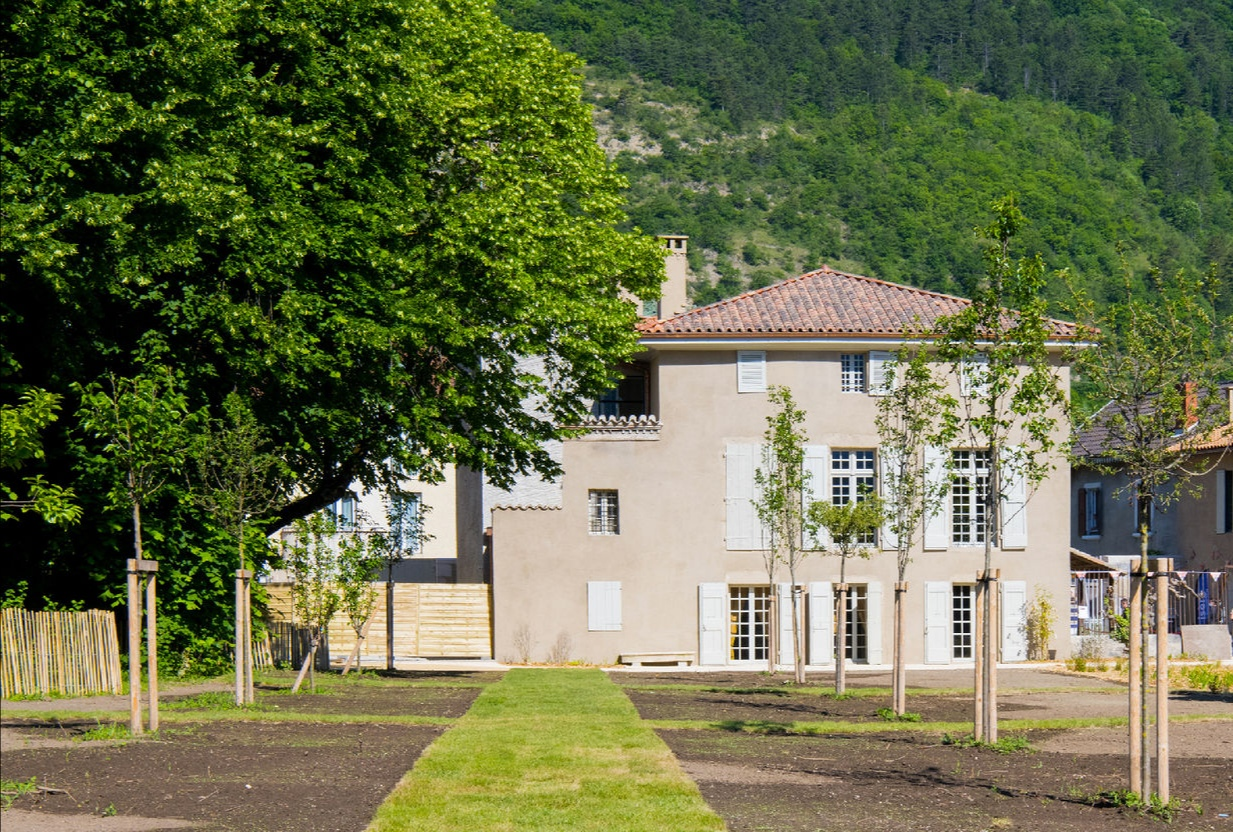
The Champollion Museum

- Vif is the home of the Champollion Museum, settled in the former family house of Jacques-Joseph Champollion-Figeac and his wife Zoé Berriat.
- The city is the cradle of the French company Vicat, founded by Joseph Vicat (son of Louis Vicat). The first cement works was built in Genevrey-de-Vif in 1857.
- The town has two churches: Saint-Jean-Baptiste de Vif and Saint-Marie du Genevrey, which is one of the oldest medieval churches in Grenoble métropole.
- The actual town hall was an ancient monastery until 1792, then a silk mill managed by the Berriat family.

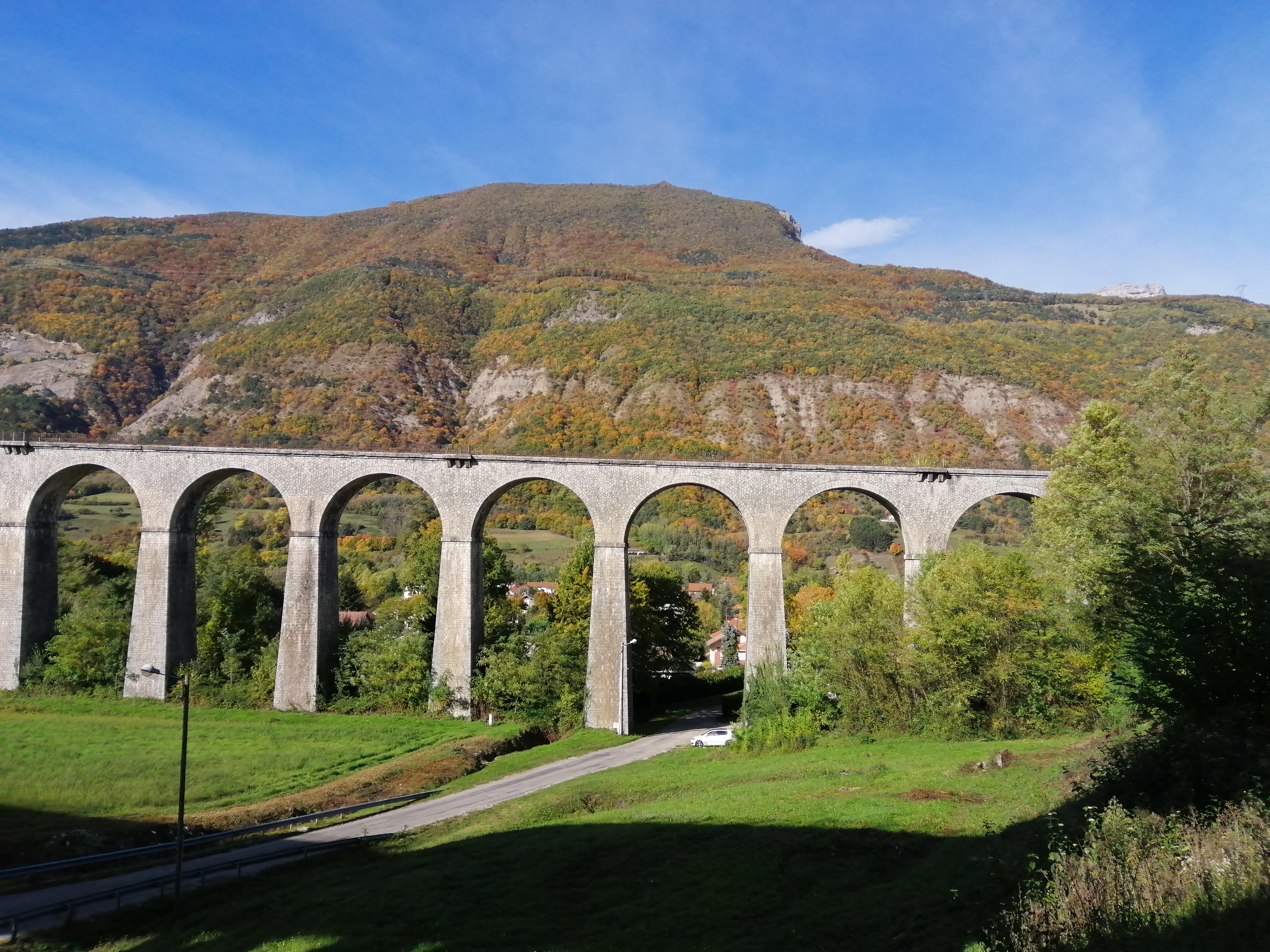
A general view of the Viaduct of Crozet

The "Line of Alps", a railway connecting Grenoble to Gap via the Alps, crosses the town territory on a 19th-century railway viaduct, the viaduct of Crozet (viaduc du Crozet).

== Notable people ==
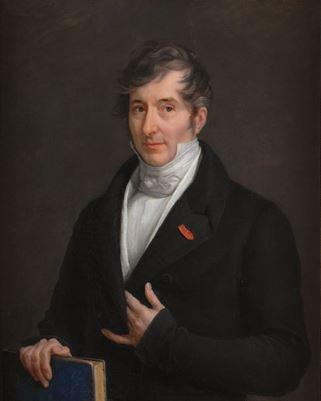
Jacques-Joseph Champollion-Figeac, brother of Jean-François

- Charles Le Goux de La Berchère (1647-1719), bishop
- Jacques-Joseph Champollion-Figeac (1778-1867), archaeologist, brother of Jean-François (Champollion le Jeune)
- Jean-François Champollion (1790-1832), philologist and orientalist, decipherer of Egyptian hieroglpyhs
- François-Jean Rochas Frenchy (1843-1894), first settler of today's Oliver Lee Memorial State Park (New Mexico)
- Yves de La Brière (1877-1941), French Jesuit born in Vif.

== Twin towns – sister cities ==
Vif is twinned with:

- Rivalta di Torino, Italy, since 1985

== See also ==
- Communes of the Isère department
