= Karl Groos =

German psychologist and philosopher (1861–1946)

Karl Groos (10 December 1861, in Heidelberg – 27 March 1946, in Tübingen) was a German philosopher and psychologist who proposed an evolutionary instrumentalist theory of play. His 1898 book on The Play of Animals suggested that play is a preparation for later life.

Groos was full Professor of philosophy in Gießen, Basel and 1911–1929 in Tübingen.

His main idea was that play is basically useful, and so it can be explained by the normal process of evolution by natural selection. When animals 'play' they are practising basic instincts, such as fighting, for survival. This is translated from the original as "pre-tuning". Despite this insight, Groos' work is seldom read today, and his connection of play with aesthetics has been termed "misguided". Another area of study was the psychology of literature, including statistical analysis.

Among his scholars is the German philosopher Willy Moog (1888–1935) (doctorate on Goethe supervised by Karl Groos in Gießen 1909).

== Works ==
- Einleitung in die Ästhetik. Gießen: Ricker, 1892
- Die Spiele der Tiere (Jena 1896); translated by J. Mark Baldwin as The Play of Animals (New York 1898) (3rd German ed. 1930)
- Die Spiele der Menschen (Jena 1899); translated by J. Mark Baldwin as The Play of Man (New York 1901) (many editions)
- Des Seelenleben des Kindes (Berlin 1904)
- 1902: Der ästhetische Genuss. Gießen: Ricker.
- 1910: Die akustischen Phänomene in der Lyrik Schillers
- 1920: Bismarck im eigenen Urteil, Stuttgart 1920
- 1922: Das Spiel. Jena: G. Fischer.

== In popular culture ==
- 2018 Tag The quote "We don't stop playing because grow old. We grow old because we stop playing" referenced throughout the movie and attributed to Benjamin Franklin is finally attributed to Karl Groos at the end of the movie.
