= Gadamer–Derrida debate =

Academic debate between Gadamer and Derrida

The Gadamer–Derrida debate concerns the issue of the containment of otherness in Gadamer's hermeneutics and it began with an encounter between Hans-Georg Gadamer and Jacques Derrida in April 1981 in a Sorbonne conference in Paris on "Text and Interpretation". Before this debate, there had not been any confrontation or dialogue between hermeneutics in Germany and post-structuralism in France.

== See also ==
- Cassirer–Heidegger debate
- Foucault–Habermas debate
- Positivism dispute
- Searle–Derrida debate
