= Werturteilsstreit =

Quarrel in German sociology and economics

The Werturteilsstreit (literally, value judgment dispute) is a Methodenstreit, a quarrel in German sociology and economics around the question of whether the social sciences are a normative obligatory statement in politics, and whether the measures therein are ought to be applied in political action and be justified scientifically.

The internecine quarrel took place in the years before World War I between the members of the Verein für Socialpolitik. The primary antagonists were Max Weber and Werner Sombart on one side, and Gustav Schmoller on the other. Weber and Sombart represented a younger generation of scholars who wanted to separate empirical science from political advocacy. They argued that empirical science can only explain facts and cause-and-effect, never what ought to be. Weber and Sombart criticized colleagues who used university lecture halls and academic associations to preach personal political or moral ideals under the guise of objective science. Gustav Schmoller was the aging representative of the economics branch of the German Historical School intellectual movement (an offshoot of Romanticism), and one of the founders of the Verein für Socialpolitik. Schmoller believed that economics is inherently an ethical science, and that the entire purpose of the Verein für Socialpolitik was to formulate practical policy recommendations and influence government legislation to improve social welfare. For Schmoller, stripping value judgments from economics would render the discipline sterile and useless for solving real-world social problems.

The Zweite Werturteilsstreit—better known as Positivismusstreit— was the debate between the supporters of Kritische Theorie and those of Kritischer Rationalismus during the 1960s .
