= Cassirer–Heidegger debate =

1929 event

Cassirer	Heidegger

The Cassirer–Heidegger debate was a 1929 encounter between Ernst Cassirer and Martin Heidegger in Davos during the Second Davos Hochschulkurs.

== Background ==
The Cassirer–Heidegger debate was an encounter between the philosophers Martin Heidegger and Ernst Cassirer from March 17 to April 6, 1929 during the Second Davos Hochschulkurs (Davos University Conference) which held its opening session in the Hotel Belvédère in Davos on 17 March 1929. Cassirer gave four lectures and Heidegger gave three lectures. The formal theme of the symposium was the Kantian question "What is man?", and the significance of Kantian notions of freedom and rationality.

Cassirer argued that while Kant's Critique of Pure Reason emphasizes human temporality and finitude, he also sought to situate human cognition within a broader conception of humanity. Cassirer challenges Heidegger's relativism by invoking the universal validity of truths discovered by the exact and moral sciences.

For Cassirer, the tension towards the infinite, present in Kant as in all philosophy and science of the modern era, is humanity's highest achievement. This intellectual tendency constituted, according to Cassirer, the main manifestation of an essential component of the human condition which he, following Kant, called "spontaneity". That is the principle according to which only through the formation of the world through "forms" projected spontaneously by the mind does the world appear ordered or objective. Heidegger objected that Kant had sensed the right path when he looked into the abyss at the base of the "throne of reason." In particular, in the Critique of Pure Reason, Kant, according to the author of Being and Time, understood that "time is the formal condition 'a priori' of every appearance." This implied that our ontological knowledge was tied to our nature as "finite" beings. In the first edition of the Critique, in 1781, Kant had even defined imagination as a "third faculty" of the human mind, placed between sensitivity and intellect, which, being "heterogeneous", needed a temporal synthesis or transcendental schematism. Heidegger and Cassirer radically opposed each other in their interpretation of Kant. For the former, it was necessary to aim at "what Kant had wanted to say", but which he had not either been able or willing to say. For Cassirer, however, the Heideggerian attempt had to be completely rejected, since in Kant's works there was sufficient material and of the utmost clarity. But for Heidegger "this was merely a confirmation of his view of how to read a philosophical tradition that deliberately veils its own truth: 'In order to wring from what the words say, what it is they want to say, every interpretation must necessarily use violence.'"

Later in 1929, Heidegger wrote Kant und das Problem der Metaphysik (1929). Rudolf Carnap, Joseph B. Soloveitchik and Emmanuel Levinas (who later recalled that: "Young student could have had the impression that he was witness to the creation and the end of the world"), were also in the audience at Davos.

== Legacy ==
In Continental Divide: Heidegger, Cassirer, Davos (Harvard University Press, 2010), Peter E. Gordon reconstructs the debate between Heidegger and Cassirer, demonstrating its significance as a point of rupture in Continental thought that implicated all the major philosophical movements of the day. Continental Divide was awarded the Jacques Barzun Prize from the American Philosophical Society in 2010. Ten years before, Michael Friedman had already paved this way in regard to Carnap, Heidegger, and Cassirer in his groundbreaking A Parting of the Ways (Open Court, 2000). A colorful recap of the debate also appears in the final chapter of Wolfram Eilenberger'sTime of the Magicians. An entirely new way of reading the Cassirer-Heidegger debate has been proposed recently by German philosophers Tobias Endres, Ralf Müller and Domenico Schneider who explore the debate not only in regard to the analytic-continental divide, but to its intercultural dimension.

== See also ==
- Friedrich Adolf Trendelenburg § Fischer–Trendelenburg debate
- Foucault–Habermas debate
- Gadamer–Derrida debate
- Hart–Dworkin debate
- Hart–Fuller debate
- Positivism dispute
- Second Conference on the Epistemology of the Exact Sciences
- Searle–Derrida debate
