= Animal symbolicum =

Animal symbolicum ('symbol-making animal' or 'symbolizing animal') is a definition for humans proposed by the German neo-Kantian philosopher Ernst Cassirer.

The tradition since Aristotle has defined a human being as animal rationale (a rational animal). However, Cassirer claimed that man's outstanding characteristic is not in his metaphysical or physical nature, but rather in his work. Humanity cannot be known directly, but has to be known through the analysis of the symbolic universe that man has created historically. Thus man should be defined as animal symbolicum (a symbol-making or symbolizing animal). On this basis, Cassirer sought to understand human nature by exploring symbolic forms in all aspects of a human being's experience. His work is represented in his three-volume Philosophie der Symbolischen Formen (1923–9, translated as The Philosophy of Symbolic Forms) and is summarized in his An Essay on Man. W.J.T. Mitchell used this term in his essay on "representation" to say that

"man, for many philosophers both ancient and modern, is the "representational animal," homo symbolicum [sic], the creature whose distinctive character is the creation and manipulation of signs - things that stand for or take the place of something else."
