= Yves de La Brière =

French Jesuit theologian and author

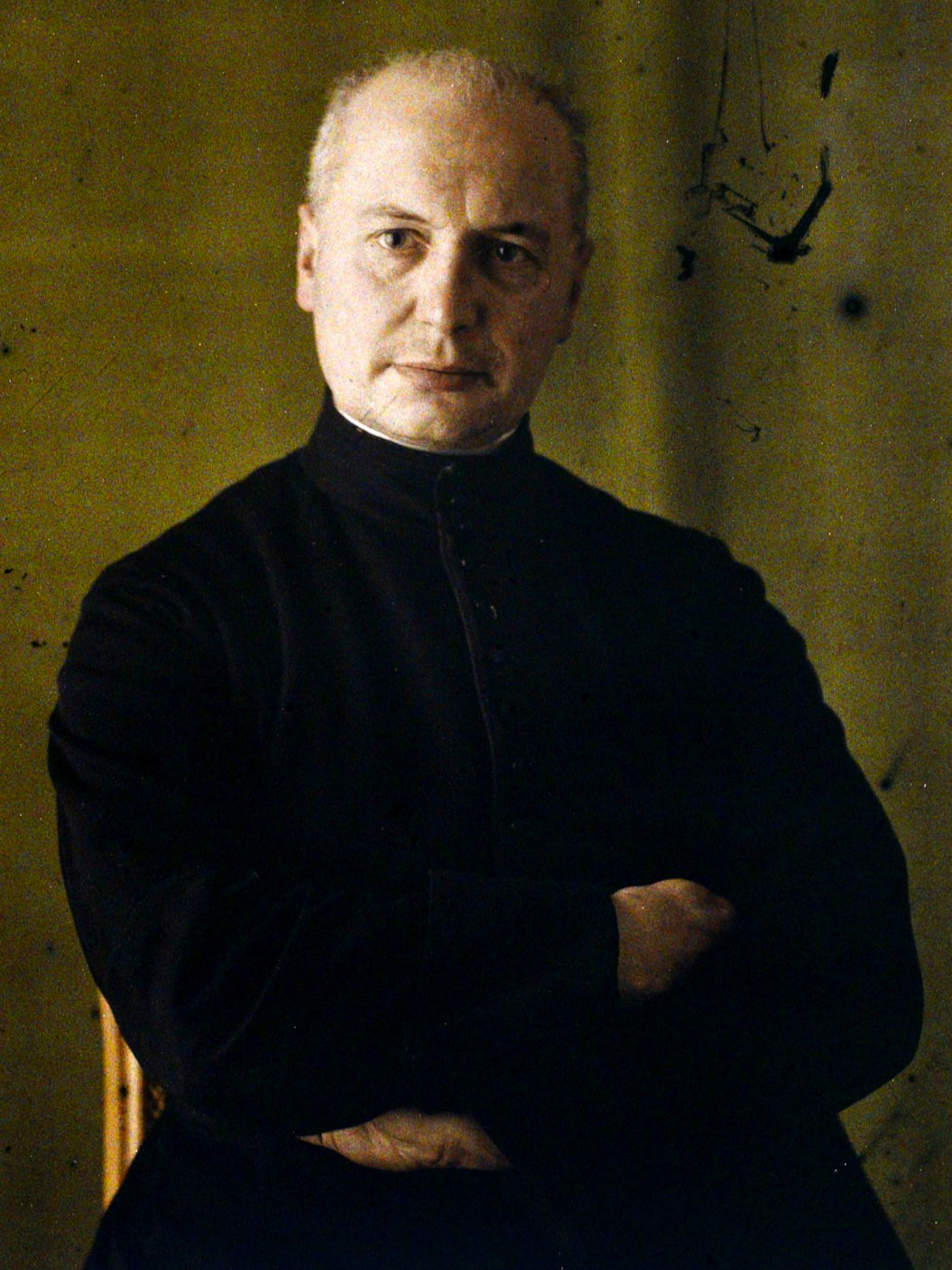
- 1925 Autochrome by Georges Chevalier
- Born: Yves Le Roy de La Brière; 30 January 1877; Vif, Isère, France
- Died: 25 February 1941 (aged 64); San Miguel, Argentina
- Occupations: Jesuit, author

Yves Le Roy de La Brière (30 January 1877 – 25 February 1941) was an influential French Jesuit theologian and author. He was a monarchist and supported the League of Nations. He was opposed to war, but wrote on the Christian tradition of just war. He was involved in the controversy in 1926 over the relationship between the Catholic church and the Catholic monarchist Action Française, which the Pope refused to support.

== Life ==
Yves Le Roy de La Brière was born in Vif, Isère, on 30 January 1877. His father was a life-long extreme monarchist. La Brière joined the Jesuits in 1894. He gained a Bachelor of Arts, History and Law. In 1909, when the review Les Etudes changed its format and contributors, he was asked by the editor-in-chief Father Léonce de Grandmaison to write a regular column that would be political, religious and international. He contributed to Les Études from 1909 to 1941.

During World War I (1914–18) La Brière actively supported the efforts by Pope Benedict XV to negotiate a compromise peace. After the war he became professor of Christian principles of international law at the Institut Catholique de Paris, where he was a strong supporter of the League of Nations and of international peace. Despite this, La Brière was attacked by Julien Benda in La Trahison des clercs (1927) due to his willingness to allow that there could be some moral justification for war. In 1930 he wrote on the subject in an article titled La conception de la paix et de la guerre chez Saint Augustin in the Revue de philosophie. La Brière's Le droit de juste guerre (1938) discussed the Christian tradition of just war based on the writings of Augustine.

In the autumn of 1926 La Brière had a private audience with Pope Pius XI in which a solution to the official Catholic position on the Action Française short of condemnation was discussed. The report of the audience was circulated widely. The Pope said he was not against monarchist politics, but was concerned with the question of moral and religious influence. At the start of December a circular from the nunciature said bishops should not grant chaplains to Action Française groups because of the risk of confusion between religion and politics. On 20 December 1926 the Pope recommended that Catholics unite in a national Catholic federation to defend religious liberties. The League's president, Bernard de Vésins, resisted condemnation of the entire executive of the League by the church. He visited Yves de La Brière on 8 January 1927, then informed the royalist pretender Prince Jean, Duke of Guise, that La Brière was under orders from the Vatican to form a rival organization in the hope of rallying Catholics from the Action Française, and was hoping for the duke's approval.

Yves de La Brière was among the presenters at the first of the Davos University Conferences in 1928, which was also attended by Albert Einstein. In 1935 he reviewed Hans Morgenthau's La Réalité des normes en particulier des normes du droit international: Fondements d’une théorie des normes (Paris: Alcan, 1934), saying "Let us simply admit our perplexity with regard to this volume. We are not sure to have understood what the author is trying to signify and demonstrate. Not only is the French deficient, but the clarity of language and of thought seem insufficient. ...But again, we undoubtedly have not understood anything and blush at our lack of perspicacity."

Yves de La Brière died in San Miguel, Argentina, on 25 February 1941.

== Selected publications ==
- Brière, Yves de La (1916), Luttes de l'Église et luttes de la patrie, Paris: G. Beauchesne
- Brière, Yves de La (1918), La Société des nations ? : essai historique et juridique, Paris: G. Beauchesne
- Brière, Yves de La (1929), Comment concilier autorité et liberté, Paris: Flammarion
- Brière, Yves de La (1930), La conception du droit international chez les théologiens catholiques, Paris: Centre européen de la Dotation Carnegie pour la paix internationale
- Brière, Yves de La (1930), "La conception de la paix et de la guerre chez Saint Augustin", Revue de philosophie, 30: 557–572
- Brière, Yves de La (1932), Église et paix, Paris: Flammarion
- Brière, Yves de La (1932), La communauté des puissances : d'une communauté inorganique à une communauté organique, Paris: Beauchesne
- Hubert, Robert; Regout, Willem (1935), 'La doctrine de la guerre juste de saint Augustin à nos jours, preface by Yves de La Brière, Paris: A. Pedone
- Brière, Yves de La (1937), "Les étapes de la tradition théologique concernant le droit de juste guerre : note d'histoire de doctrine", Revue générale de droit international public, 44: 129–161
- Brière, Yves de La (1937), "Les trois conditions thomistes de la juste guerre et le droit de gens d'aujourd'hui", Revue thomiste, 43: 276–300
- Brière, Yves de La (1938), Le droit de juste guerre: tradition théologique, adaptations contemporaines, Paris: Pedone
- Brière, Yves de La (1939), "L'œuvre concordataire de Pie XI à la rencontre du droit canonique et du droit civil", Chiesa e Stato. Studi storici e giuridici per il decennale della conciliazione tra la Santa Sede e l'Italia, Milan: Vita e Pensiero, pp. 511–528.

== Sources ==
- Bernauer, James; Maryks, Robert Aleksander (2013-11-07), "The Tragic Couple": Encounters Between Jews and Jesuits, BRILL, ISBN 978-90-04-26037-5
- Clogan, Paul Maurice (1990), Medievalia Et Humanistica, Rowman & Littlefield, ISBN 978-0-8476-7658-3
- Dansette, Adrien (September 1951), "L'Eglise et l'Action française: I: Jusqu'a la Condamnation", Esprit (in French), Nouvelle série, 182 (9), Editions Esprit, JSTOR 24252374
- Davoser Blätter [Davos Diary. 1928 – 1931] (in German). Bern: Swiss National Library. (available only at the National Library, Ref 7q107)
- Goyet, Bruno (2001), Henri d'Orléans, comte de Paris (1908–1999) : le prince impossible (in French), Odile Jacob, ISBN 978-2-7381-0934-7
- Goyet, Bruno; Picard, Emmanuelle (1993), "Les mouvements catholiques pour la paix à travers les papiers du Père Yves de la Brière (s.j.)", Matériaux pour l'histoire de notre temps (in French), 30 (1)
- Grey, Alan L. (2017-07-05), Civilian Victims in War: A Political History, Taylor & Francis, ISBN 978-1-351-52831-3
- Jütersonke, Oliver (2010-08-19), Morgenthau, Law and Realism, Cambridge University Press, ISBN 978-1-139-49130-3
- Sutton, Michael (2002-06-20), Nationalism, Positivism and Catholicism: The Politics of Charles Maurras and French Catholics 1890–1914, Cambridge University Press, ISBN 978-0-521-89340-4
- Yves de La Brière (1877–1941) (in French), BnF: Bibliotheque nationale de France
