= Jacques-Joseph Champollion-Figeac =

French archaeologist (1778–1867)

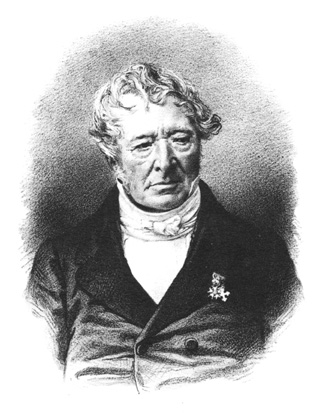
- Born: 5 October 1778; Figeac, France
- Died: 9 May 1867 (aged 88); Fontainebleau, France
- Known for: Brother of Jean-François Champollion
- Scientific career
- Fields: archaeology
- Workplaces: Château de Fontainebleau

Signature
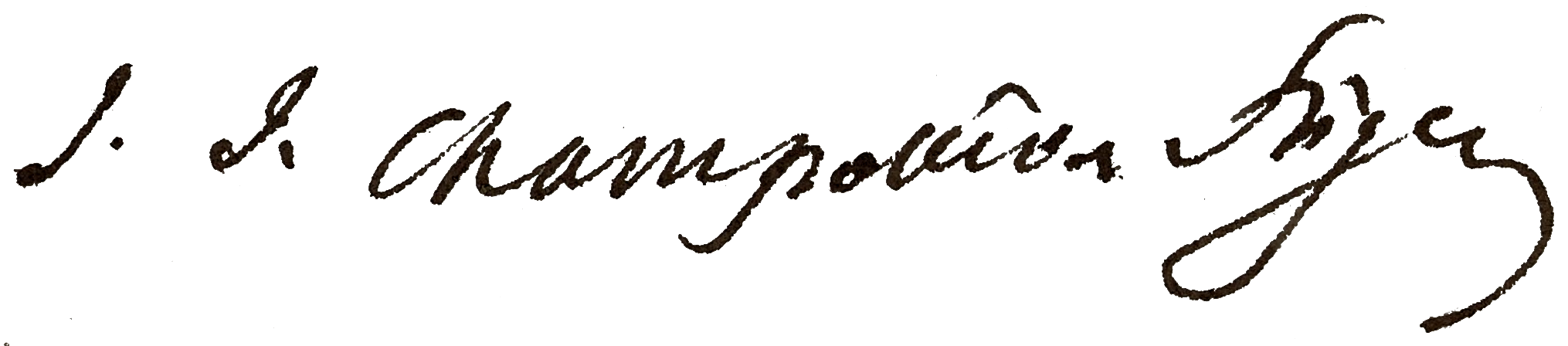

Jacques-Joseph Champollion-Figeac (French: [ʃɑ̃pɔljɔ̃ fiʒak]), also known as Champollion l'aîné ('the Elder'; 5 October 1778 – 9 May 1867) was a French archaeologist, elder brother of Jean-François Champollion (decipherer of the Rosetta Stone).

== Biography ==
He was born at Figeac in the département of Lot. He became professor of Greek and librarian at Grenoble. His research in Grenoble in 1803 revealed the existence of a Merovingian crypt under the church of St. Laurent. He was compelled to retire in 1816 on account of the part he had taken during the Hundred Days. He afterwards became keeper of manuscripts at the Bibliothèque Nationale in Paris, and professor of palaeography at the École des Chartes. In 1850 he became librarian of the Château de Fontainebleau.

He was a correspondent, living abroad, of the Royal Institute of the Netherlands from 1832 to 1851.

== Works ==
He edited several of his brother's works, and was also author of original works on philological and historical subjects, among which may be mentioned:

- Antiquités de Grenoble (1807)
- Nouvelles recherches sur les patois ou idiomes vulgaires de la France (1809)
- Nouveaux éclaircissements sur la ville de Cataro, aujourd'hui Grenoble (1814)
- Annales de Lagides (1819; supplement, 1821)
- Chartes latines sur papyrus du VIe siècle de l'ère chrétienne.
- Charte de Commune en langue romane, pour la ville de Gréalou en Quercy; publiée avec sa traduction française et des recherches sur quelques points de l'histoire de la langue romane en Europe et dans le Levant (1829), containing a partial edition of the Arabic–Old French glossary
- L'Egypte ancienne et moderne (1840) Based on his brother's manuscript collections.
- L'écriture démotique égyptienne (1843) Based on his brother's manuscript collections.
- Traité élémentaire d'archéologie (2d ed. 1843)
- Histoire des peuples anciens et modernes, l'Asie centrale, l'Inde et la Chine (1857)
- Monographie du palais de Fontainebleau (1859–64)
- Documents paléographiques relatifs à l'histoire des beaux-arts et des belles-lettres pendant le moyen âge (1868)

== Legacy ==
His son Aimé-Louis (1812–1894) became his father's assistant at the Bibliothèque Nationale and, besides a number of works on historical subjects, wrote a biographical and bibliographical study of his family in Les Deux Champollion (Grenoble, 1887).

In Vif near Grenoble, The Champollion Museum is located at the former abode of Jacques Joseph.

== In popular culture ==
Champollion was portrayed by Stuart Bunce in the 2005 BBC docudrama Egypt.
