= Champollion Museum (Vif) =

Museum in France

Coordinates: 45°03′14″N 5°40′09″E

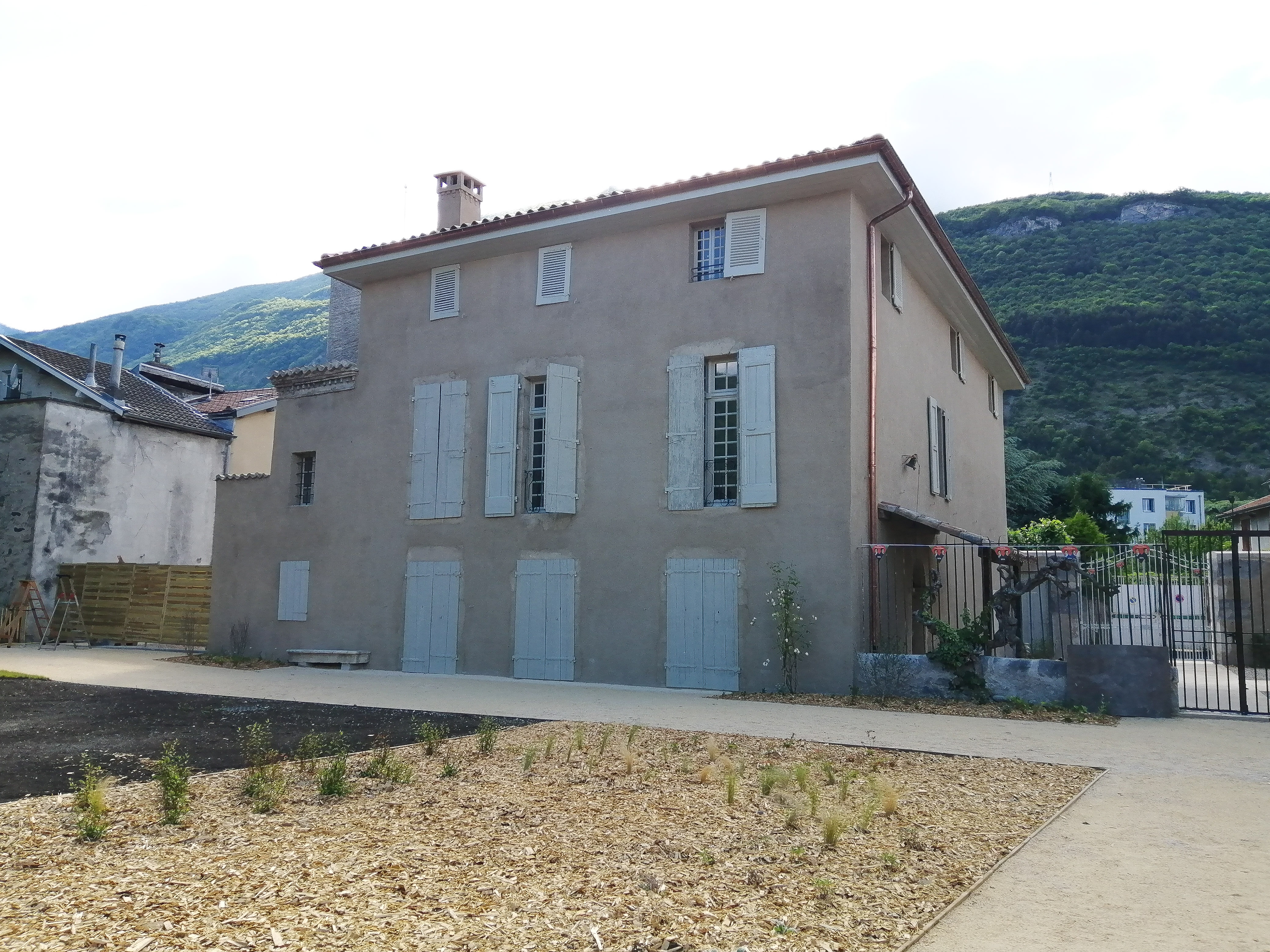
The Champollion Museum.

The Champollion Museum (French: Musée Champollion) is a French historical museum located in Vif in the family home of the Champollion brothers. It presents the daily life of the discoverer of Egyptian hieroglyphs and that of his brother Jacques Joseph while they lived in Grenoble.

The museum opened temporarily in 2004 during the ninth International Conference of Egyptology in Grenoble. It was then closed for renovation. It reopened on June 5, 2021. In February 2020, the museum was named a Musée de France by the Minister of Culture.

The Louvre stores 85 Egyptian objects in this museum.

== Gallery ==
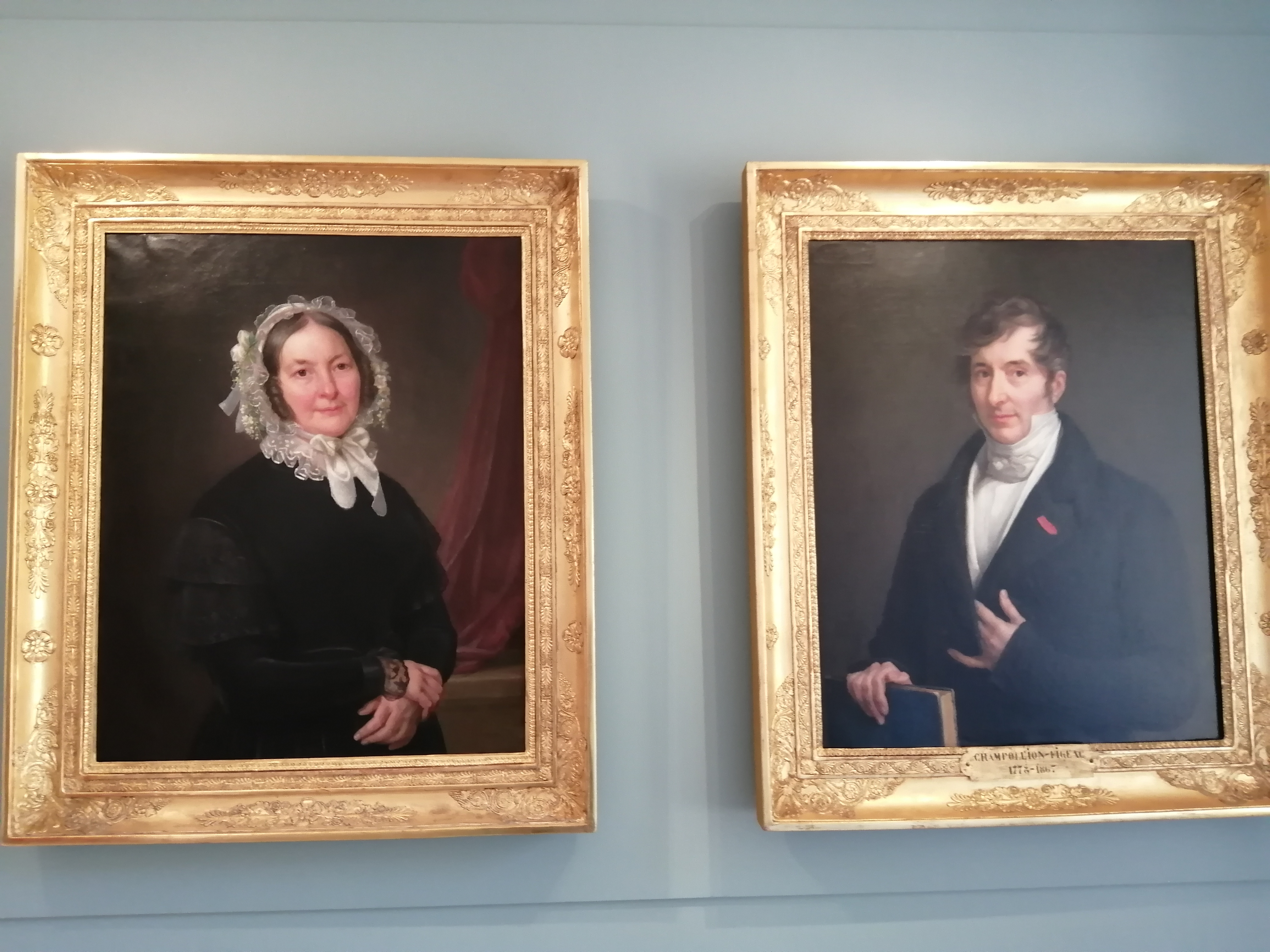
Zoé and her husband Jacques-Joseph Champollion.

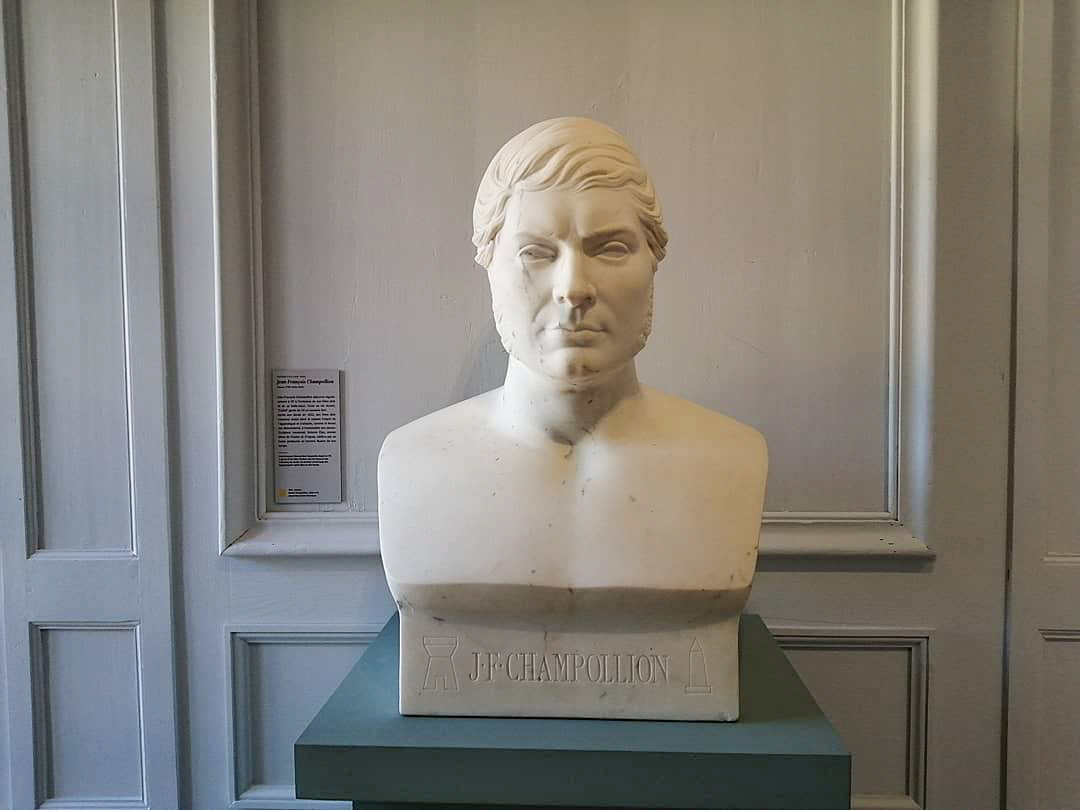
Bust of Jean-François Champollion.

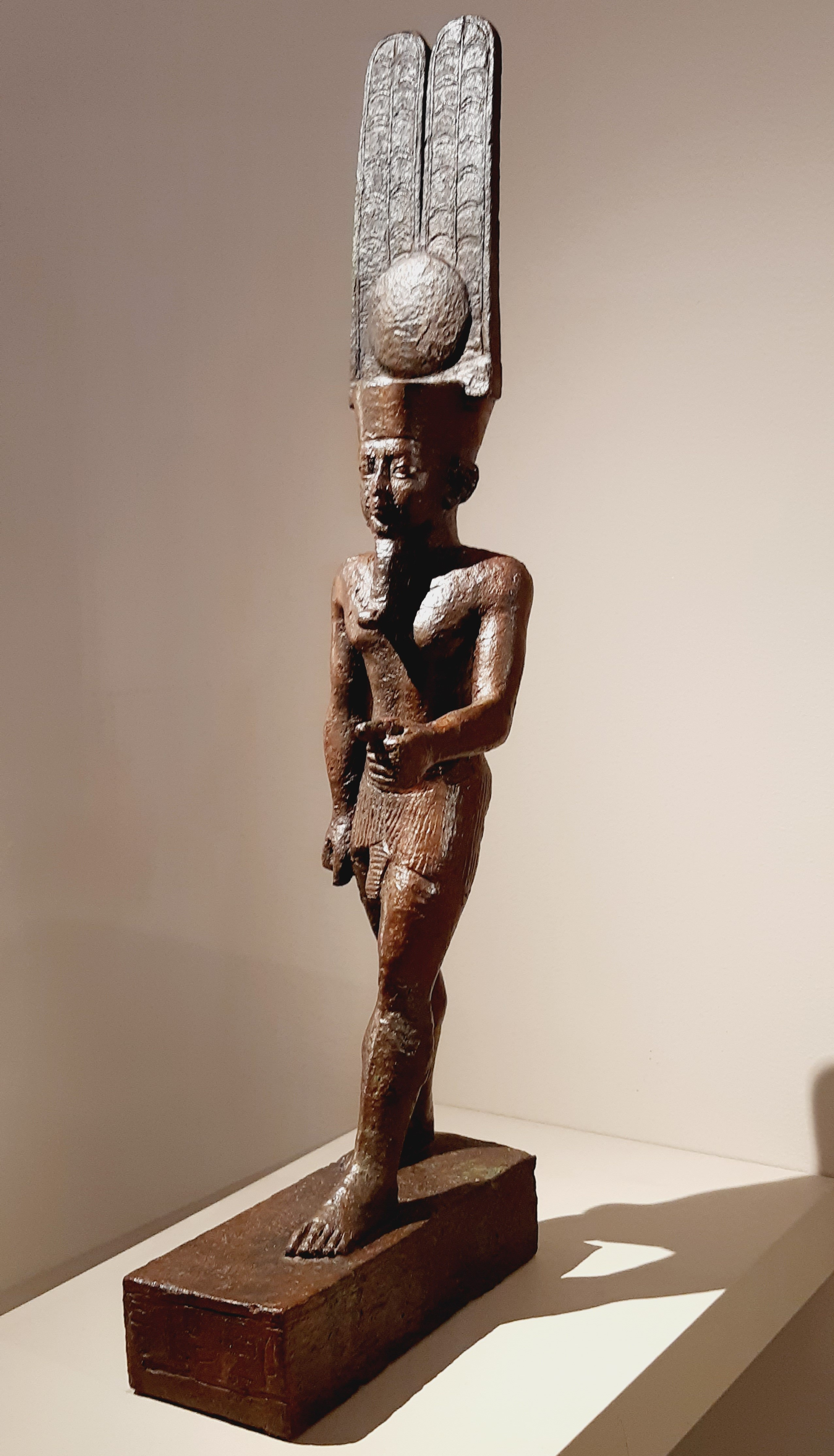
statuette of an Egyptian god.

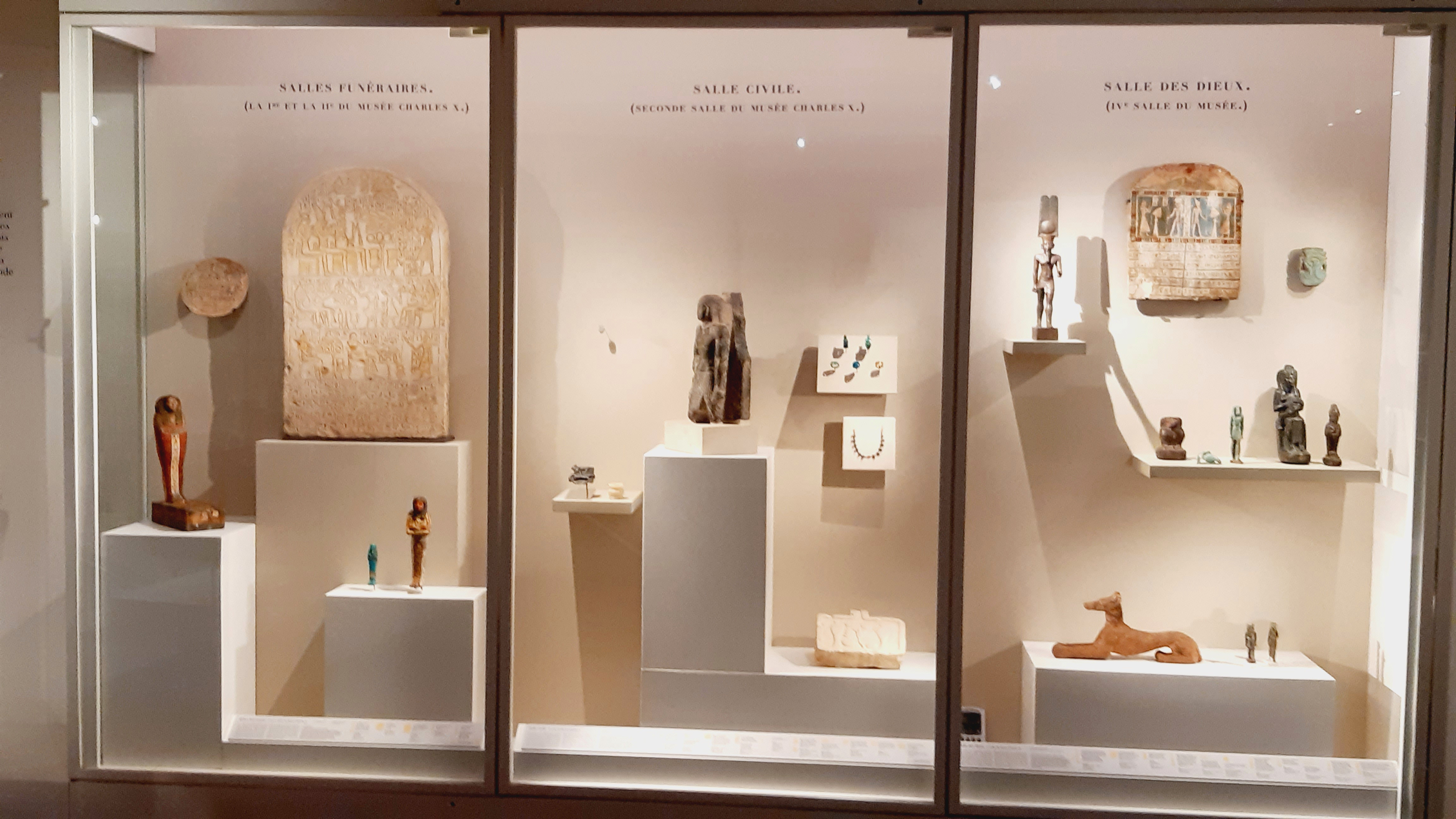
Samples of Egyptian objects from the first Egyptian museum of the Louvre (Museum Charles X in 1827).
