= Foucault–Habermas debate =

Academic debate on the nature of power

Foucault	Habermas

The Foucault–Habermas debate was a dispute concerning the question whether either Michel Foucault's ideas of "power analytics" and "genealogy," or Jürgen Habermas' ideas of "communicative rationality" and "discourse ethics" provide the better critique of the nature of power in society.

Arguments compared and evaluated the central ideas of Habermas and Foucault pertaining to questions of power, reason, ethics, modernity, democracy, civil society, and social action.

The debate was a dialogue between texts and followers; Foucault and Habermas did not actually debate in person, though they were considering a formal one in the U.S. before Foucault's death in 1984. Habermas' essay Taking Aim at the Heart of the Present (1984) was altered before release in order to account for Foucault's inability to reply. Habermas wrote:

Foucault discovers in Kant, as the first philosopher, an archer who aims his arrow at the heart of the most actual features of the present and so opens the discourse of modernity ... but Kant's philosophy of history, the speculation about a state of freedom, about world-citizenship and eternal peace, the interpretation of revolutionary enthusiasm as a sign of historical 'progress toward betterment' – must not each line provoke the scorn of Foucault, the theoretician of power? Has not history, under the stoic gaze of the archaeologist Foucault, frozen into an iceberg covered with the crystals of arbitrary formulations of discourse?

Nancy Fraser's contentious, but oft-quoted, claim that Foucault's work is a mixture of "empirical insights and normative confusions" exemplifies the most common strategy of critique by those favoring Habermas. It attempts to demonstrate the incoherence of Foucault's practice of critical reflection while at the same time appropriating those aspects considered valuable. Demonstrating this incoherence is necessary from the Habermasian position for its universalism, whereas Foucault sought to establish only one form of critical reflection.

In response, many of Foucault's advocates argue the Habermasian critique presupposes what it seeks to show and that the critique is based on a misunderstanding of Foucault's work. In 1999, S. Ashenden and D. Owen published an edited volume of papers entitled Foucault contra Habermas: Recasting the dialogue between genealogy and critical theory in an attempt to re-engage the debate and shift the dialogue to new ground. Specifically, they aimed to 1) illuminate the stakes of the encounter between the different practices of critical reflection, 2) evaluate some major criticisms of genealogy made in the course of the debate, and 3) offer a critical response to Habermas' position from the perspective of Foucault's practice in relation to contemporary politicophilosophical and political issues.

The publication of Foucault's Collège de France lectures in the early 21st century has also served to recast the Foucault–Habermas. The lectures on biopolitics and governmentality, as well as Foucault's relation to Kant and neoliberalism has resulted in a number of scholars revisiting questions of normativity, resistance and critique in Foucault's work.

== See also ==
- Cassirer–Heidegger debate
- Gadamer–Derrida debate
- Positivism dispute
- Power (social and political)
- Rationality
- Rationality and Power
- Searle–Derrida debate
- Chomsky–Foucault debate

== Bibliography ==
- Ingram, David. "Foucault and Habermas on the Subject of Reason". In Gutting, Gary, ed. (1994). The Cambridge Companion to Foucault Cambridge: Cambridge University Press. pp. 215–261. ISBN 0-521-40887-3.
- Kelly, Michael ed. (1994). Critique and Power: Recasting the Foucault/Habermas Debate. Cambridge: MIT Press. ISBN 0-262-61093-0.
