= Positivism dispute =

1960s political and philosophical dispute

The positivism dispute (German: Positivismusstreit) was a political-philosophical dispute between the critical rationalists (Karl Popper, Hans Albert) and the Frankfurt School (Theodor Adorno, Jürgen Habermas) in 1961, about the methodology of the social sciences. It grew into a broader discussion within German sociology from 1961 to 1969. The name itself was controversial, inasmuch as the Frankfurt School proponents accused the critical rationalists of being positivists – this despite the latter considering themselves to be opponents of positivism.

== Overview ==
The debate began in 1961 in Tübingen, West Germany, at the Conference of the German Society of Sociology. The speakers at the conference were invited to discuss the differences between social and natural sciences and the status of values in the social sciences.

In 1963, the debate was heated by Jürgen Habermas in the Festschrift für Adorno (writings in honor of Adorno). The debate became more intensely critical at Sociology Day in Heidelberg when Herbert Marcuse joined the discussion. A spirited literary debate between Habermas and Hans Albert sprang up and positivism became the centre of the debate.

The participants also discussed the question of whether Karl Popper's and Hans Albert's critical rationalism had exacerbated ethical problems. The Frankfurt School (Theodor Adorno, Jürgen Habermas) believed this should be impossible, because as a theory of science critical rationalism is seen to be restricted to the field of knowledge.

The famous dispute inspired a collection of essays which were published in 1969. This book was translated into several languages, including English in 1976. This collection revived the debate and introduced these ideas to a broader audience.

== Elements of the dispute ==
The dispute has its foundation in the value judgment dispute (Werturteilsstreit) in German sociology and economics around the question of whether or not the statements from various social sciences are normative and obligatory in politics, and whether or not their measures can be justified scientifically and be applied in political actions. Consequently, the positivism dispute is also called the Second Werturteilsstreit.

The precursor of the debate about positivism can be traced back to Max Horkheimer's essay "Der neueste Angriff auf die Metaphysik" ("The Latest Attack on Metaphysics") published in 1937, that criticized the logical positivism of the Vienna Circle. The prolonged criticism of positivism led to the formation of two camps: on one side critical rationalism advanced by Karl Popper and on the other side, the critical theory advanced in the Frankfurt School. This view was strengthened by the fact that Popper's main work, Logic of Scientific Discovery, was published in the main book series of the Vienna Circle. Popper, however, considered himself an opponent of positivism, and his main work was a sharp attack on it.

Both camps accept that sociology cannot avoid a value judgement that inevitably influences subsequent conclusions. In critical rationalism, the scientific approach should be maintained in sociology, and wherever the use of an induction method is not possible, it should be avoided. This leads to a sociology having a firm ground in observations and assured deductions that cannot be ignored in politics. For critical rationalism, sociology is best conceived as a set of empirical questions subject to scientific investigation.

Frankfurt School critical theory, by contrast, denies that sociology can be severed from its metaphysical heritage; empirical questions are necessarily rooted in substantive philosophical issues. Drawing on concepts from Hegelian and Marxian traditions, critical theory conceives society as a concrete totality, a social environment, e.g., family, authorities, peers or mass media shape individual consciousness. According to the Frankfurt School, it is important to discover the society's fabric to allow individuals to overcome being cornered. Critical rationalism considers this goal to be impossible and any attempts (changing society based on possibly non-scientific deductions) to be dangerous. The Frankfurt School counters critical rationalism as being itself cornered, disallowing itself from asking scientific questions when some methods are just not available. Marx argues that "It is not the consciousness of men that determines their existence, but their social existence that determines their consciousness." The social existence impacts the mindset of scientists as well. Hypotheses generated by scientists (which would need to be falsified) spring from society's thinkable. While critical rationalism provides methods that are supposed to have an influence on society, the absence of a metaphysical critique of society makes the reforms advocated by Popper ineffective for noticeable changes.

== Reception by Carl Sachs ==
In 2020, philosopher Carl Sachs contended that the Frankfurt School and Vienna Circle, rather than Popperian adherents tout court, comprised the two sides of the debate. In addition to an overemphasis on Popper's seminar in this debate, each side misunderstood the extent of the other's grievances. In Sachs' telling, "Frankfurters" interpreted "the Vienna Circle as fundamentally concerned with the explication of objectivity, which they carried out in purely formal terms so that nothing 'subjective' entered into the conception of objectivity." Vienna Circle members, especially Popper, likewise misconstrued the Frankfurt School, specifically Adorno and Horkheimer, as omitting or repudiating "a better future" for society and physical science. Fears of determinism by the Frankfurt School propelled members to promote moments of violent revolution as the only means to escape such historicism. Thus, approaches to gradual reform measures had been occluded from the ideas of the Frankfurt School.

Sachs held that members of the Frankfurt School and members of the Vienna Circle underestimated each other. The Vienna School, rather than deemphasizing subjectivity and intersubjectivity in the pursuit of positivism, "never even attempted to study the role of subjectivity and intersubjectivity in epistemology." The Vienna Circle believed that "the commitment to the unity of science, the explication of a purely formal conception of objectivity, and the use of mathematical logic to do so are not epistemological projects." In fact, they had already arrived at a similar conclusion, that "speculative metaphysical systems such as those of Henri Bergson or German Idealism were useless for science because they could not satisfy the formal conditions of objectivity." The Vienna Circle instead wished to design a "formal semantics of declarative assertions" that could "be [universally] said to anyone by anyone," thereby furthering a "neglect of subjectivity" and, conversely, an "explication of objectivity" in "mathematical or symbolic logic" that produced "scientific explanations". Certainly, the Circle "conceptualize[d] the distinction between synthetic statements as truths of mathematical logic together with sensory qualities" to a limited extent, but their emphasis was on "declarative assertions" devoid of "subjectivity" in "mathematical or symbolic logic".

Frankfurt School members, on the other hand, did not aim to repudiate the notion of "a better future", an impulse that purportedly derived from their historicism. Rather, "the Frankfurters" were principally concerned with assessing conceptual underpinnings, including the development of a given "philosophy of language", that could potentially advance "irrationality and short-sightedness", both of which Sachs associated with "contemporary neoliberalism". The Frankfurt School, at least in its "first generation" (and, with a young Habermas, the beginning of the second), believed that "the truth-content of German Idealism had to be interpreted allegorically as the hope for a truly rational society." They hoped to forge a path to "a post-capitalist society in which cooperation, rather than competition, is the underlying logic of all institutions and the social practices supported by them." Common hope for a "utopian rational society", premised on different yet reconcilable beliefs, underscored the projects of both the Frankfurt and Vienna Schools. Sachs noted the compatibility element: "there is no reason why a purely formal explication of objectivity [by the Vienna Circle] should interfere with a diagnosis and critique of social pathologies of rational subjectivity and intersubjectivity [by the Frankfurt School]."

== See also ==
- Antipositivism
- Cassirer–Heidegger debate
- Chomsky–Foucault debate
- Foucault–Habermas debate
- Gadamer–Derrida debate
- Popper legend
- Searle–Derrida debate
- Science wars
- Scientific rationalism
