= Vicat =

French manufacturer of cement and ready-mix concrete

Vicat SA
- Type: Public
- Traded as: Euronext: VCT; CAC Mid 60
- Industry: Construction
- Founded: 1853
- Headquarters: Paris, France
- Products: Cement, Concrete, Aggregates
- Revenue: ▲€ 2.014 billion (2010)
- Number of employees: 7,369 (December 2010)
- Website: www.vicat.com

Vicat SA is a French company manufacturing cement, aggregates and ready-mix concrete in four continents.

Its activity has developed in France by vertical integration and abroad by acquisitions and, more recently by building Greenfield factories.

It is now present in 12 countries: in France (number three in the market behind Lafarge and Ciments Calcia/Italcementi), in Switzerland (number two in the market), in the United States, in Turkey, in Italy, in Egypt, in Senegal, Mali, Mauritania, Kazakhstan, India and since 2018 in Brazil.

== History ==
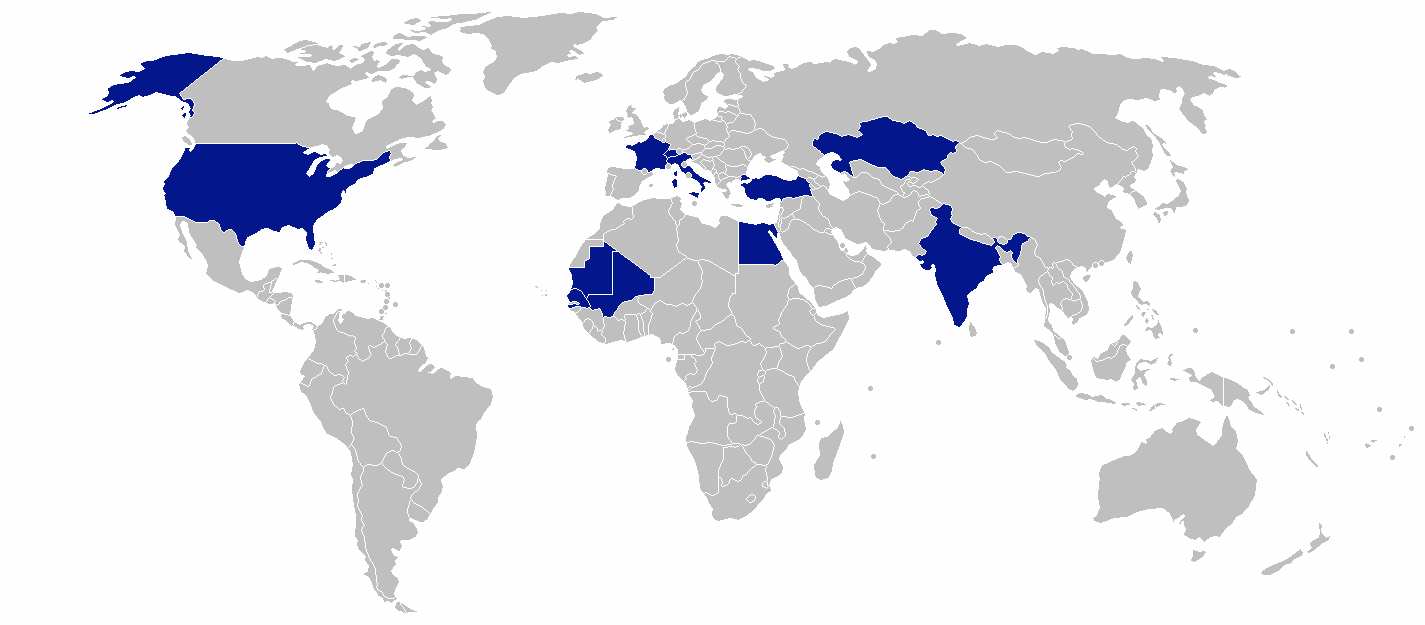
World locations of Vicat.

The company was established in 1853 by Joseph Vicat (1821–1902), son of Louis Vicat, who invented artificial cement in 1817. His cement plant was at Genevrey-de-Vif south of Grenoble (Isère). It used an argillaceous limestone that Joseph Vicat had established as suitable by chemical analysis. The company expanded in 1922 with the construction of a plant at Montalieu nearby.

In 1968, HeidelbergCement bought a stake in the company, which eventually grew to 35%. Major expansion began in 1968, with the construction of another plant in the Grenoble area and with a program of acquisitions throughout France. In 1974, overseas investment began with the acquisition of National Cement at Ragland, Alabama. Further acquisitions followed in California, Turkey, Senegal, Switzerland, Egypt and Kazakhstan.

HeidelbergCement sold its share of the company in 2007. In 2008, Vicat acquired BSA Ciment in Mauritania and also created Jambyl Cement LLP in Kazakhstan. In 2019, Vicat acquired Ciplan in Brazil. In 2021, Vicat relocates its head office to L'Isle d'Abeau.

All of these acquisitions, together with a policy of increasing internal production capacity, increased production from two million tonnes of cement in 1965 to more than twenty million tonnes in 2009. That is a continuous annual increase of 18% in capacity production over the period considered.

== Operations ==
Today, the company claims a cement manufacturing capacity of 21 million tonnes per annum (2007), from 13 integrated cement plants and one clinker grinding plant.

In France:

- Créchy, Allier, at 46°15′01″N 3°25′27″E
- La Grave de Peille, Alpes Maritimes, at 43°47′39″N 7°22′26″E
- Montalieu, Isère, at 45°48′16″N 5°25′19″E
- Saint-Égrève, Isère, at 45°13′50″N 5°40′4″E
- Xeuilley, Meurthe-et-Moselle, at 48°33′45″N 6°6′36″E

In Egypt:

- Arish, North Sinai, at 30°43′21″N 33°47′12″E

In Italy (grinding only):

- Oristano, Sardinia, at 39°52′N 8°33′E

In Kazakhstan:

- Mynaral, Jambyl Region, at 45°23′23″N 73°39′10″E

In Senegal:

- Rufisque, Dakar, at 14°42′29″N 17°14′55″W

In Switzerland:

- Reuchenette, Bern, at 47°11′7″N 7°14′54″E

In Turkey:

- Elmadağ, Ankara, at 39°56′41″N 33°11′31″E
- Konya, at 37°56′23″N 32°32′4″E

In USA:

- Lebec, California, at 34°49′12″N 118°44′59″W
- Ragland, Alabama, at 33°44′04″N 86°9′14″W

They also make "Ciment Prompt" – a fast-setting natural cement, at La Perelle, by burning at moderate temperature an unground argillaceous limestone obtained from an underground mine in the Chartreuse Mountains.

The company makes 9.7 million cubic metres per annum (2007) of ready-mix concrete in four countries. The company has also bought stake in the Indian company Sagar Cements and a controlling 51% stake in Indian politician Y.S. Jaganmohan Reddy promoted Bharathi Cements.
