= Fons Elders =

Dutch philosopher

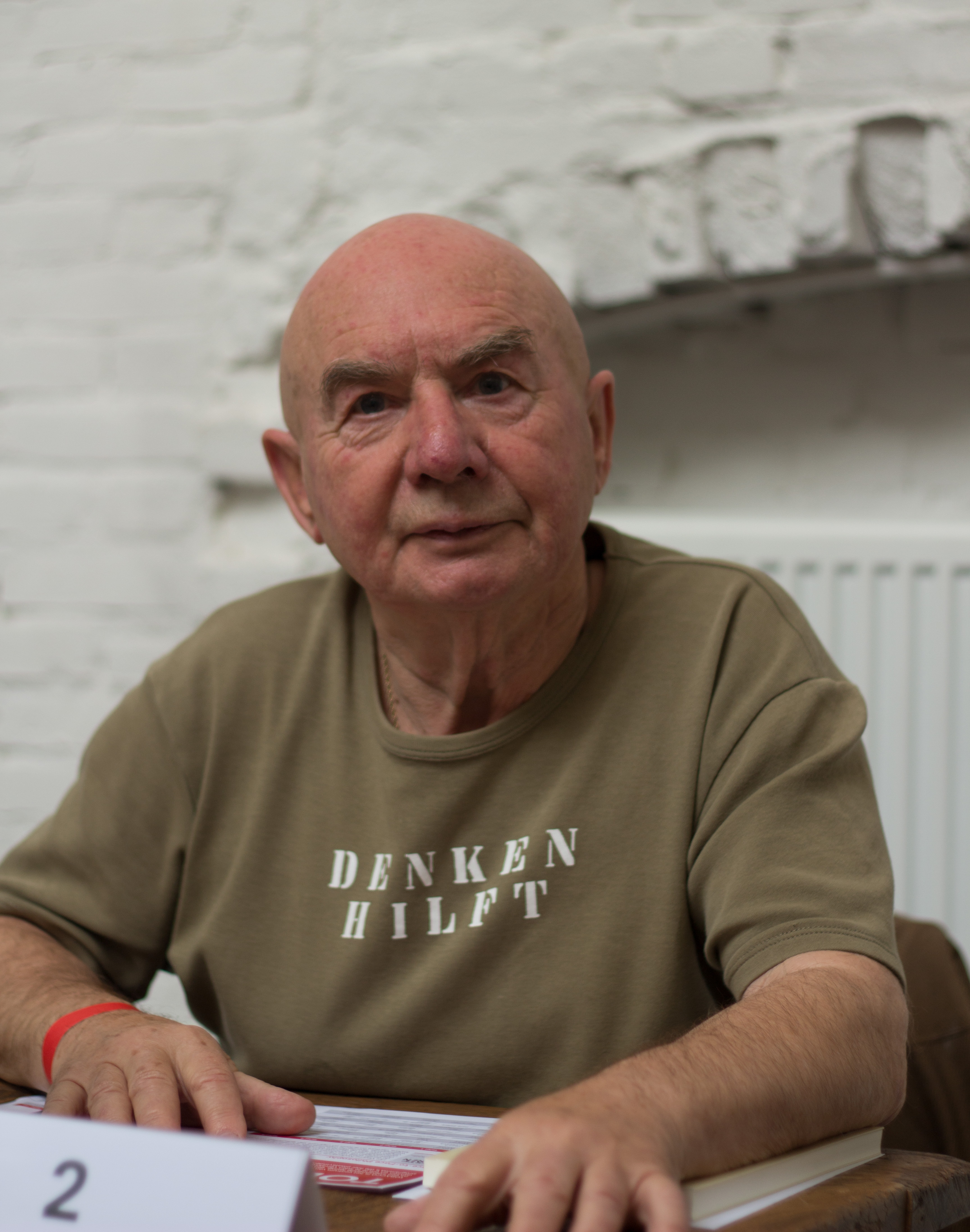
Fons Elders during Brainwash Festival in 2015

Fons Elders (born 1936) is a Dutch philosopher and an emeritus professor at the University of Humanistic Studies. He was the host of the famous Chomsky–Foucault debate in 1971.
