= Milton P. Gordon =

American microbiologist (1930–2005)

Milton Paul Gordon (1930–July 5, 2005) was an American plant biologist who researched phytoremediation, the ability of plants to absorb and neutralize contaminants, and plant genetic engineering.

== Early life and career ==
Milton Paul Gordon was born in Saint Paul, Minnesota in 1930 to Eastern European immigrants. He had at least one sibling, Gladys. He attended the University of Minnesota and graduated summa cum laude with degrees in chemistry and mathematics. He received his Ph.D. in biochemistry from the University of Illinois at the age of 23. Around 1957, Gordon published articles concerning organic chemistry at Memorial Sloan Kettering Cancer Center, and he published papers on the tobacco mosaic virus working for the Virus Laboratory at the University of California, Berkeley.

== Academic career ==
In 1959, Gordon joined the University of Washington faculty. Gordon published research with Eugene Nester on the ability of the bacterium agrobacterium tumefaciens to splice DNA into plant cells. They found that A. tumefaciens could insert a growth hormone into plant cells. This research contributed to the use of Agrobacterium to modify crops for insect resistance and nutrition.

Gordon published work on phytoremediation, the use of plants to remove contaminants from the environment. In one paper, hybrid poplar trees could be used to remove the toxic chemicals tetrachloroethylene and carbon tetrachloride from the soil.

Gordon was elected to the American Society of Microbiology in 2000. He was an associate editor of the journal Biochemistry for over three decades.

== Later years and death ==
Gordon retired from the University of Washington as professor emeritus in 2003. Gordon died on July 5, 2005 at the age of 75, suffering with multiple system atrophy. The International Phytotechnology Society named the Milton P. Gordon Award for Excellence in Phytoremediation in his honor.

== Personal life ==
Gordon was married to Elaine "Sunnie" Gordon. They met at the University of Illinois. Gordon's obituary notes three children, including Peter Gordon.
