= Albert Pauphilet =

French medievalist

Albert Pauphilet (13 April 1884 – 28 June 1948) was a French university professor and medievalist.

== Biography ==
Albert Pauphilet completed his secondary studies at the Lycée Condorcet, during which he obtained the honorary prize for French composition at the Concours Général. He obtained a baccalaureate in letters in 1902.

He entered the École normale supérieure in 1905, where he obtained an associate degree in 1908 and defended in 1921 a thesis on The Quest for the Holy Grail attributed to Gautier Map . He participated in 1929 in the second Davos University conferences, along with many other French and German intellectuals.

Initially assigned as professor of French literature to the University of Cairo from 1908 to 1910, he was successively lecturer at the University of Lille (1912), lecturer of French literature at the Faculty of Letters of Clermont-Ferrand (1919), lecturer in language and Middle Ages literature at the Faculty of Letters of Lyon (1922) and professor of French language and Middle Ages literature at the Faculty of Letters in Lyon (1923).

Professor of French literature of the Middle Ages at the Faculty of Letters of Paris from 1934, he has thus edited numerous articles and books on the medieval period, such as the first volume of Strowski and Moulinier's "History of French Literature". We also owe him new editions of period texts such as the "Quest for the Holy Grail", often reissued.

Imprisoned under the Occupation because of his resistance activities (on his attitude of opposition to Vichy and the Occupier during the Occupation, and in particular on his vote of opposition to the application of the statute of Jews during a preliminary vote at the Sorbonne Faculty Assembly of December 1940), he succeeds the Liberation of Jérôme Carcopino as head of the École normale supérieure, which he directed until his death in 1948.

He is the father of the resistant Bernard Pauphilet.

== Distinctions ==
Albert Pauphilet was appointed National Order of the Legion of Honour in a military capacity in 1924, officer on 5 April 1946 and received the Croix de guerre in 1915. He also received Yugoslav and Czechoslovak decorations between 1918 and 1934. He was laureate of the Académie française for the Narcisse-Michaut award in 1923. He was awarded the Order of the White Lion.
