= Louis Vicat =

French engineer who invented cement in France

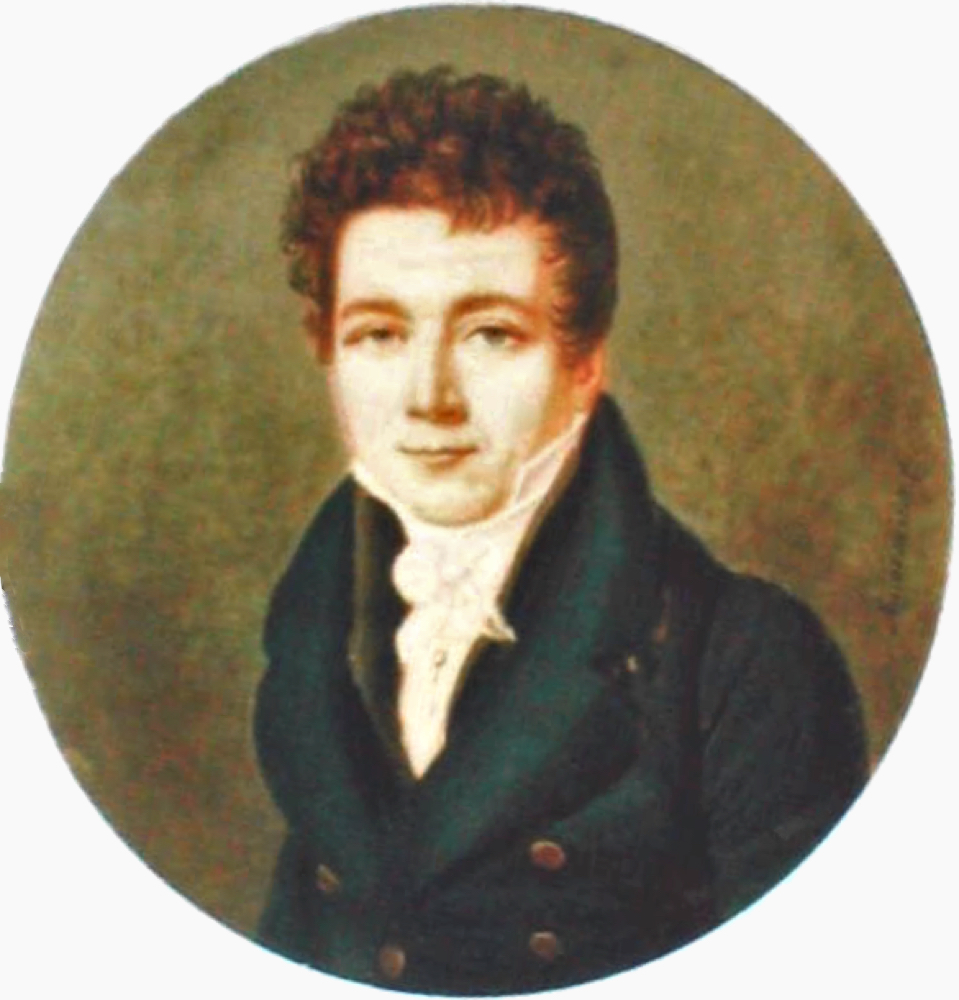
Portrait of Louis Vicat as a young man.

Louis Vicat (31 March 1786, Nevers – 10 April 1861, Grenoble) was a French engineer.

He graduated from the École Polytechnique in 1804 and the École des Ponts et Chaussées in 1806.

Vicat studied the setting of mortars and developed his own. The first building using it is the bridge at Souillac (Dordogne), erected in 1818. The material was popular but was superseded by Portland cement. He also invented the Vicat needle that is still in use for determining the setting time of concretes and cements. His son Joseph Vicat founded Vicat Cement, which is today a large international cement manufacturing company.

He was a member of the French Academy of Sciences and his name is one of the 72 names inscribed on the Eiffel Tower. Vicat was elected a Foreign Honorary Member of the American Academy of Arts and Sciences in 1855.

== Bibliography ==
- Guy Coriono (1997) 250 ans de l'École des Ponts et Chaussées en cent portraits. 222 pp. Presses de l'École Nationale des Ponts et Chaussées, Paris, ISBN 2-85978-271-0.
- Antoine Picon (1997) L'art de l'Ingénieur. Constructeur, entrepreneur, inventeur. 598 pp. Editions du Centre Pompidou, Paris, ISBN 2-85850-911-5.
