= Chomsky–Foucault debate =

1971 debate about human nature

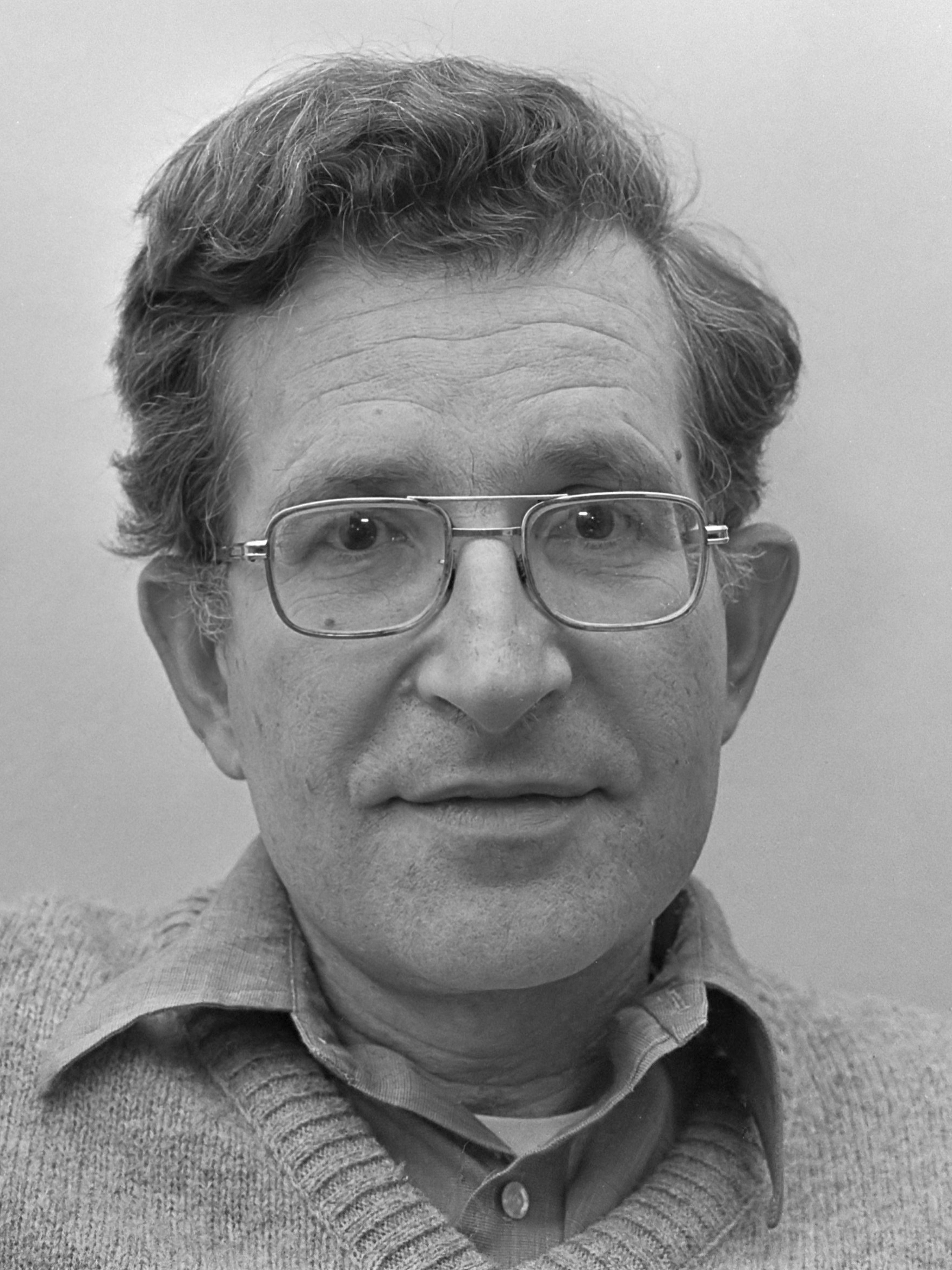
Noam Chomsky

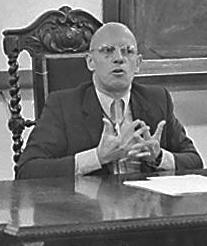
Michel Foucault

The Chomsky–Foucault debate was a debate about human nature, between Noam Chomsky and Michel Foucault at the Eindhoven University of Technology in the Netherlands, on 22 October 1971 at 7:30 p.m. The debate was broadcast on 28 November 1971 at 9:30 p.m. Chomsky and Foucault were invited by the Dutch philosopher Fons Elders to discuss an age-old question: "is there such a thing as 'innate' human nature independent of our experiences and external influences?"

As the moderator summarized the topic: "All learning concerning man, ranging from history to linguistics and psychology, are faced with the question [of] whether in the last instance, we are the product of all kinds of external factors, or if, in spite of our differences, we have something we could call a common human nature by which we can call each other human beings." Noam Chomsky and Michel Foucault assumed opposing viewpoints on the question. Chomsky argued human nature was real, and identified it with innate structures of the human mind, consistent with his theory of universal grammar. Foucault explained the same phenomena by reference to human social structures.

For example, while acknowledging that it would be futile to try to accurately predict the nature of a post-revolutionary society, Chomsky maintained that it still is worthwhile to engage in the task of theory construction. Even if they cannot provide a complete picture of a future society, theories can still offer a vision and a sense of direction for revolutionary struggle. Foucault replied to this by questioning the basis of such theories. According to him, our conceptions of human nature are acquired from our own society, civilization and culture. He gave, as an example of this, late 19th and early 20th century Marxism which, according to Foucault, borrowed its conception of happiness from bourgeois society. Ideas about sexuality, family life and aesthetics were borrowed from bourgeois examples. Foucault maintained that in adopting a certain conception of human nature we risk reconstituting old power relations in a post-revolutionary society, to which Chomsky replied: "Our concept of human nature is certainly limited, partial, socially conditioned, constrained by our own character defects and the limitations of the intellectual culture in which we exist, yet at the same time it's of critical importance that we have some direction, that we know what impossible goals we're trying to achieve, if we hope to achieve some of the possible goals."

During the debate, Foucault was critical of what he saw as the hidden political power of seemingly neutral institutions. According to him, power is viewed in European society as something which belongs to institutions of political power (such as the government) and related sectors of society such as the state apparatus, police and the army. But according to Foucault, institutions such as the family, schools, universities, medicine and psychiatry all serve to maintain power in the hands of one social class and exclude the other. He saw it as a central intellectual task to criticize such institutions: "It seems to me that the real political task in a society such as ours is to criticize the workings of institutions, which appear to be both neutral and independent; to criticize and attack them in such a manner that the political violence which has always exercised itself obscurely through them will be unmasked, so that one can fight against them."

Chomsky agreed, adding that he concurs not only in theory but also in practice. However, according to him, the main institutions which have to be fought in modern society are economic: namely, financial institutions and multinational corporations. According to Chomsky, even if they present themselves as subject to the democracy of the market-place, they are still autocratic. Power is vested in a minority of owners and managers while the working majority have no real control over the operation of the corporation. According to Chomsky, such institutions gain their power from the domination of market forces in what he saw were the inegalitarian societies of the West.

== See also ==
- Innateness hypothesis
- Noam Chomsky bibliography and filmography
- Opposition to United States involvement in the Vietnam War
- Political positions of Noam Chomsky
- Foucault–Habermas debate
- Searle-Derrida debate
- Vietnam War
