= Max Wentscher =

German philosopher (1862–1942)

Max Wentscher (12 May 1862— 29 September 1942) was a German philosopher and professor of philosophy at the University of Bonn.

== Life ==
Max Wentscher was born in Grudziądz in 1862. The son of a merchant, he attended the Academic School of the Johanneum (Gelehrtenschule des Johanneums) in Hamburg, where he graduated in 1881. From 1881 to 1887 he studied mathematics, physics, and philosophy in Berlin, Freiburg, Halle-Wittenberg, and Leipzig. In 1893 he received his doctorate in Halle-Wittenberg with the thesis Lotze's concept of God and its metaphysical justification. In 1897 he habilitated in Bonn. Until 1904 he was a private lecturer and titular professor in Bonn. From 1904 to 1906 he was an associate professor in Königsberg, and from 1906 to 1918 again in Bonn. From 1918 until his retirement in 1933, he was a full professor of philosophy and education at the University of Bonn. His main research areas were ethics and the history of philosophy. Wentscher was married to the philosopher Else Wentscher (1877–1946), who published works on German and British philosophy and translated John Stuart Mill into German.

== Selected works ==
- Geschichte der Ethik (1931); Bd. 3 der Reihe Geschichte der Philosophie in Längschnitten von Willy Moog, Berlin: Juncker und Dünnhaupt, 11 Bde.
- Metaphysik (1928), Berlin: W. de Gruyter & Co.
- Pädagogik (1926), Berlin: W. de Gruyter & Co.
- Fechner und Lotze (1925), München: E. Reinhardt.
- Erkenntnistheorie (1920), Berlin: Vereining. wiss. Verl., Sammlung Göschen, 2 Bde.
- Einführung in die Philosophie (1916), Berlin: Göschen, 4. Neudr.
- Hermann Lotze (1913), Heidelberg: Winter.
- Das Problem der Lehrfreiheit (1907), Heidelberg: J. C. B. Mohr.
- Ethik (1902/1906), Leipzig: Johann Ambrosius Barth, 2 Bde.
- Über physische und psychische Kausalitat und das Prinzip des Psycho-physischen Parallelismus (1896), Leipzig: Johann Ambrosius Barth.
