= Arthur Liebert =

German philosopher (1878–1946)

- Born: Arthur Levy; November 10, 1878; Berlin, German Empire
- Died: November 5, 1946 (aged 67); Berlin, Allied-occupied Germany

Education
- Education: University of Berlin (PhD, 1907; Habilitation, 1925)
- Academic advisors: Friedrich Paulsen; Alois Riehl

Philosophical work
- Era: 20th-century philosophy
- Region: Western philosophy
- School: Neo-Kantianism; Critical idealism
- Institutions: Handels-Hochschule Berlin; University of Berlin
- Main interests: Epistemology, metaphysics, dialectic, humanism

Arthur Liebert (born Arthur Levy; 10 November 1878 – 5 November 1946) was a German philosopher, editor, and organizer of philosophical scholarship. Trained at the University of Berlin, he studied under Wilhelm Dilthey, Friedrich Paulsen, Alois Riehl, Georg Simmel, and Carl Stumpf. His early work belonged to Neo-Kantianism, anti-naturalist, and critical idealism, but later moved toward dialectical idealism and universal humanism.

== Biography ==
Liebert was born in Berlin into a Prussian Jewish family. After school he worked for six years as a merchant, then studied philosophy from 1901 to 1905. In 1905 he converted to Lutheranism and published selected writings of Pico della Mirandola. He received his doctorate in 1907 and completed his habilitation in 1925.

From 1910 to 1927 he was deputy managing director of the Kant Society, and from 1927 to 1933 its sole managing director. In 1933 he was dismissed because of his Jewish ancestry. His publication business was affected by the Nazi boycott of Jewish businesses. He left Berlin to Prague before he emigrated to Belgrade, founded the journal Philosophia, and later moved to Birmingham. In 1946 he returned to Berlin as first dean of the Pedagogical education Faculty of the University of Berlin.

== Work ==
Liebert emphasized Kant's transcendental dialectic and the antinomy as links between Criticalism and German idealism. His works include Das Problem der Geltung, Erkenntnistheorie, and Der universale Humanismus. Liebert was directly involved in the publication of Husserl's final project; Crisis of the European Sciences.
