= Ernst Cassirer =

German philosopher (1874–1945)

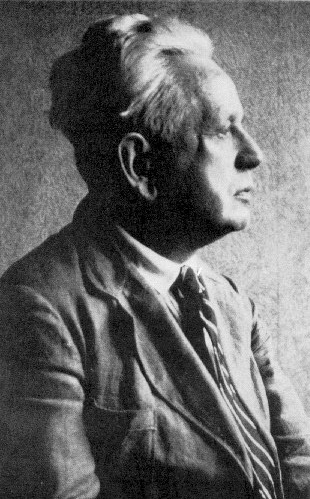
- Cassirer, c. 1935
- Born: Ernst Alfred Cassirer; July 28, 1874; Breslau, Silesia, Prussia, German Empire (now Wrocław, Poland)
- Died: April 13, 1945 (aged 70); New York City, U.S.

Education
- Education: University of Marburg (PhD, 1899); Friedrich Wilhelm University of Berlin (Dr. phil. habil., 1906)
- Theses: Descartes' Critique of Mathematical and Scientific Knowledge (1899); The Problem of Knowledge in Philosophy and Science in the Modern Age: Volume I (1906)
- Doctoral advisor: Hermann Cohen; Paul Natorp

Philosophical work
- Era: 20th-century philosophy
- Region: Western philosophy
- School: Neo-Kantianism (Marburg school)
- Institutions: Yale University; Columbia University
- Doctoral students: Joachim Ritter
- Notable students: Arthur Pap; Hans Reichenbach
- Main interests: Epistemology, aesthetics, semiotics, history of philosophy
- Notable ideas: Philosophy of symbolic forms Animal symbolicum Ontic structural realism

Ernst Alfred Cassirer (/kɑːˈsɪərər, kəˈ-/ kah-SEER-ər, kə-; German: [ˈɛʁnst kaˈsiːʁɐ]; July 28, 1874 – April 13, 1945) was a German philosopher and historian of philosophy. Trained within the Marburg school of neo-Kantianism, he initially followed his mentor Hermann Cohen in attempting to supply an idealistic philosophy of science.

After Cohen's death in 1918, Cassirer developed a theory of symbolism and used it to expand the "logic and psychology of thought" into a more general "logic of the cultural sciences". Cassirer was one of the leading 20th-century advocates of philosophical idealism. His most famous work is the Philosophy of Symbolic Forms (1923–1929).

Though his work received a mixed reception shortly after his death, more recent scholarship has remarked upon Cassirer's role as a staunch defender of the moral idealism of the Enlightenment era and the cause of liberal democracy at a time when the rise of fascism had made such advocacy unfashionable. Within the international Jewish community, Cassirer's work has additionally been seen as part of a long tradition of thought on ethical philosophy.

== Biography ==
Cassirer was born in Breslau in Silesia (modern-day southwest Poland) into a Jewish family. After graduating from Johannesgymnasium Breslau, he studied Jurisprudence at Friedrich Wilhelm University of Berlin and Leipzig University, Germanic Philology, Contemporary Literary History, and Philosophy at Ruprecht Karl University of Heidelberg and Friedrich Wilhelm University of Berlin, and Philosophy and Psychology at the Ludwig-Maximilians-Universität München (LMU). He then did his doctoral work at the University of Marburg, where he studied Philosophy under Hermann Cohen and Paul Natorp and Mathematics under Friedrich Schottky. In 1899 he graduated with a dissertation on René Descartes's analysis of mathematical and natural scientific knowledge entitled Descartes' Kritik der mathematischen und naturwissenschaftlichen Erkenntnis (Descartes' Critique of Mathematical and Scientific Knowledge) and completed his habilitation in 1906 at the University of Berlin with the dissertation Das Erkenntnisproblem in der Philosophie und Wissenschaft der neueren Zeit: Erster Band (The Problem of Knowledge in Philosophy and Science in the Modern Age: Volume I).

Politically, Cassirer supported the liberal German Democratic Party (DDP). After working for many years as a Privatdozent at the Friedrich Wilhelm University in Berlin, Cassirer was elected in 1919 to the philosophy chair at the newly founded University of Hamburg, where he lectured until 1933, supervising amongst others the doctoral theses of Joachim Ritter and Leo Strauss. Through Adolf Hitler's rise to power, the Nazi Party ascended on 30 January 1933. Because Cassirer was Jewish, he fled Nazi Germany on 12 March 1933, one week after its March 1933 German federal election.

He taught for a couple of years at the University of Oxford before becoming a professor at University of Gothenburg. Cassirer considered Sweden too unsafe and applied for a post at Harvard University, but they declined to hire him because thirty years earlier, he had declined their offer. In 1941, he became a visiting professor at Yale University. In 1943, he moved to Columbia University, where he lectured until his death in 1945. Cassirer died of a heart attack in April 1945 in New York City. The young rabbi Arthur Hertzberg, his student at Columbia, conducted the funeral service. His grave is located in Westwood, New Jersey, on the Cedar Park Beth–El Cemeteries in the graves of the Congregation Habonim. His son, Heinz Cassirer, was also a Kantian scholar.

His family was prominent and included the neurologist Richard Cassirer, the publisher and gallery owner Bruno Cassirer, and the art dealer and editor Paul Cassirer.

== Influences ==
Donald Phillip Verene, who published some of Cassirer's papers kept at Yale University, gave this overview of his ideas:

"Cassirer as a thinker became an embodiment of Kantian principles, but also of much more, of an overall movement of spirit stretching from the Renaissance to the Enlightenment, and on to Herder's conception of history, Goethe's poetry, Wilhelm von Humboldt's study of the Kavi language, Schelling's Philosophie der Mythologie, Hegel's Phenomenology of Spirit, and Vischer's conception of the aesthetic symbol, among many others. Cassirer's own position is born through a mastery of the whole development of this world of the humanistic understanding, which included the rise of the scientific world view — a mastery evident both in his historical works and in his systematic philosophy."

== Work ==
=== History of science ===
Cassirer's first major published writings were a history of modern thought from the Renaissance to Kant. In accordance with his Marburg neo-Kantianism he concentrated upon epistemology. His reading of the Scientific Revolution, in books such as The Individual and the Cosmos in Renaissance Philosophy (1927), as a "Platonic" application of mathematics to nature, influenced historians such as E. A. Burtt, E. J. Dijksterhuis, and Alexandre Koyré.

=== Philosophy of science ===
In Substance and Function (1910), he writes about late nineteenth-century developments in physics including relativity theory and the foundations of mathematics. In Einstein's Theory of Relativity (1921) he defended the claim that modern physics supports a neo-Kantian conception of knowledge. He also wrote a book about Quantum mechanics called Determinism and Indeterminism in Modern Physics (1936).

=== Philosophy of symbolic forms ===
At Hamburg, Cassirer discovered the Library of the Cultural Sciences founded by Aby Warburg. Warburg was an art historian who was particularly interested in ritual and myth as sources of surviving forms of emotional expression. In Philosophy of Symbolic Forms (1923–29), Cassirer argues that man (as he put it in his more popular 1944 book Essay on Man) is a "symbolic animal". Whereas animals perceive their world by instincts and direct sensory perception, humans create a universe of symbolic meanings. Cassirer is particularly interested in natural language and myth. He argues that science and mathematics developed from natural language, and religion and art from myth.

=== The Cassirer–Heidegger debate ===
In 1929, Cassirer took part in a historically significant encounter with Martin Heidegger in Davos during the Second Davos Hochschulkurs (the Cassirer–Heidegger debate). Cassirer argues that while Kant's Critique of Pure Reason emphasizes human temporality and finitude, he also sought to situate human cognition within a broader conception of humanity. Cassirer challenges Heidegger's relativism by invoking the universal validity of truths discovered by the exact and moral sciences.

=== The Philosophy of the Enlightenment ===
Cassirer believed that reason's self-realization leads to human liberation. Mazlish (2000), however, notes that Cassirer in his The Philosophy of the Enlightenment (1932) focuses exclusively on ideas, ignoring the political and social context in which they were produced.

=== The Logic of the Cultural Sciences ===
In The Logic of the Cultural Sciences (1942), Cassirer argues that objective and universal validity can be achieved not only in the sciences, but also in practical, cultural, moral, and aesthetic phenomena. Although inter-subjective objective validity in the natural sciences derives from universal laws of nature, Cassirer asserts that an analogous type of inter-subjective objective validity takes place in the cultural sciences.

=== The Myth of the State ===
Cassirer's last work, The Myth of the State (1946), was published posthumously. On one level, it is an attempt to understand the intellectual origins of Nazi Germany. Cassirer sees Nazi Germany as a society in which the dangerous power of myth is not checked or subdued by superior forces. The book discusses the opposition of logos and mythos in Greek thought, Plato's Republic, the medieval theory of the state, Machiavelli, Thomas Carlyle's writings on hero worship, the racial theories of Arthur de Gobineau, and Hegel. Cassirer claimed that in 20th-century politics there was a return, with the passive acquiescence of Martin Heidegger, to the irrationality of myth, and in particular to a belief that there is such a thing as destiny. Of this passive acquiescence, Cassirer says that in departing from Husserl's belief in an objective, logical basis for philosophy, Heidegger attenuated the ability of philosophy to oppose the resurgence of myth in German politics of the 1930s.

The Myth of the State discusses the surrender of rational logic to fascist mythology. Cassirer wrote that while fascist propaganda mythmaking flagrantly contradicted empirical reality, it provided a simple and direct answer to the anxieties of the secular present.

== Legacy ==
The Kantian scholar Lewis White Beck noted that Cassirer's Substance and Function (Substanzbegriff und Funktionsbegriff) served as a major source of inspiration during his early studies as an undergraduate with Leroy Loemker in the 1930s.

== Partial bibliography ==
- Leibniz' System in seinen wissenschaftlichen Grundlagen (1902)
- The Problem of Knowledge: Philosophy, Science, and History since Hegel. 1906–1920. Archived from the original on June 5, 2011 – via Questia.
- "Kant und die moderne Mathematik." Kant-Studien 12, 1–40 (1907)
- Substance and Function [Substanzbegriff und Funktionsbegriff] (1910) and Einstein's Theory of Relativity [Einsteinschen Relativitätstheorie] (1921), English translation 1923 (online edition)
- Freedom and Form [Freiheit und Form] (1916)
- Kant's Life and Thought [Kants Leben und Lehre] (1918), English translation 1981
- Philosophy of Symbolic Forms [Philosophie der symbolischen Formen] (1923–29), English translation 1953–1957
  - Volume One: Language [Erster Teil: Die Sprache] (1923), English translation 1955
  - Volume Two: Mythical Thought [Zweiter Teil: Das mythische Denken] (1925), English translation 1955
  - Volume Three: The Phenomenology of Knowledge [Dritter Teil: Phänomenologie der Erkenntnis] (1929), English translation 1957
- Language and Myth [Sprache und Mythos] (1925), English translation 1946 by Susanne K. Langer
- The Individual and the Cosmos in Renaissance Philosophy [Individuum und Kosmos in der Philosophie der Renaissance] (1927), English translation 1963 by Mario Domandi
- "Erkenntnistheorie nebst den Grenzfragen der Logik und Denkpsychologie" ["Epistemology along with Border Questions of Logic and the Psychology of Thought"]. Jahrbücher der Philosophie, 3, 1927, pp. 31–92
- Die Idee der republikanischen Verfassung (1929)
- "Kant und das Problem der Metaphysik. Bemerkungen zu Martin Heideggers Kantinterpretation." Kant-Studien 26, 1–16 (1931)
- The Philosophy of the Enlightenment [Die Philosophie der Aufklärung] (1932), English translation 1951
- Determinism and Indeterminism in Modern Physics: Historical and Systematic Studies of the Problem of Causality [Determinismus und Indeterminismus in der modernen Physik] (1936), English translation 1956
- The Logic of the Cultural Sciences [Zur Logik der Kulturwissenschaften] (1942), English translation 2000 by Steve G. Lofts (previously translated in 1961 as The Logic of the Humanities)
- An Essay on Man (written and published in English) (1944) (books.google.com)
- The Myth of the State (written and published in English) (posthumous) (1946) (Internet Archive)
- Symbol, Myth, and Culture: Essays and Lectures of Ernst Cassirer, 1935–1945, ed. by Donald Phillip Verene (March 11, 1981)
- Ernst Cassirer: Gesammelte Werke. Hamburger Ausgabe. Electronic Edition. (2016) – The electronic version of the definitive edition of Cassirer's works, published in print by Felix Meiner Verlag, and electronically in the Past Masters series.
- The Philosophy of Symbolic Forms, Vol. 4, The Metaphysics of Symbolic Forms. Edited and translated by John Michael Krois and Donald Philip Verene from manuscripts left after Cassirer's death. Published 1996, New Haven & London: Yale University Press.
- The Warburg Years (1919–1933): Essays on Language, Art, Myth, and Technology. Translated and with an Introduction by S. G. Lofts with A. Calcagno. New Haven & London: Yale University Press.
