= John Kells Ingram =

Irish mathematician, economist and poet

- Born: 7 July 1823; Templecarne, near Pettigo; County Donegal, Ireland
- Died: 1 May 1907 (aged 83); Dublin
- Occupations: mathematician, economist, poet, polymath

John Kells Ingram (7 July 1823 – 1 May 1907) was an Irish mathematician, economist and poet. He has been co-credited, along with John William Stubbs, with introducing the geometric concept of inversion in a circle.

== Biography ==
=== Early life ===
Ingram was born on 7 July 1823, at the Rectory of Templecarne (Aghnahoo), just south of Pettigo, a village in south-east County Donegal, Ireland into an Ulster Scots family.

Although his ancestry was Scottish Presbyterian, Ingram's grandparents had converted to Anglicanism. His grandfather Captain John Ingram ran a linen mill and had a business as a linen bleacher in Glennane (Lisdrumhure). He was active in the Volunteer Movement and financed in 1782 a volunteer corps in the County Armagh, known as Lisdrumhure Volunteers or Mountnorris Volunteers.

Ingram's father, Rev. William Ingram, a scholar at Trinity College Dublin, rector of the Church of Ireland and curate of Templecarne Parish (Diocese of Clogher), married Elizabeth Cooke in 1817.

Ingram's father died in 1829 and his mother then moved with the family to Newry, to guarantee the best possible education for her five children. Ingram first went to Mr. Lyons' School in Newry from 1829 to 1837. He also attended Drogheda Grammar School.

In 1840, at the age of sixteen, Ingram published sonnets in the Dublin University Magazine.

=== Academic career ===
On 13 October 1837, he matriculated at Trinity College Dublin. He was elected a Scholar of the college in 1840, graduated with a BA in mathematics in 1842, and was awarded an MA in 1850. He was a member of the College Historical Society. His early scholarly publications (1842–1847) were in mathematics. He had a distinguished career at Trinity, spanning over fifty-five years, as a student, fellow and professor, successively of Oratory, English Literature, Jurisprudence and Greek, LL.D, FTCD), subsequently becoming the College Librarian and ultimately its Vice Provost.

During his life, Ingram was President of the Library Association of Great Britain, co-founder of the National Library of Ireland, National Library trustee, Vice-president of the Library Association of Ireland, a member of the Royal Irish Academy, co-founder of the Dublin Statistical Society, honorary member of the American Economic Association, member of the English historical school of economics and co-founder of the Hermathena publication.

=== The Memory of the Dead ===
One evening in March 1843 Ingram wrote the poem for which he is best remembered, a political ballad called "The Memory of the Dead" (better known as "Who Fears to Speak of '98"; or "Ninety Eight"), in honour of the Irish Rebellion of 1798 led by the United Irishmen. On that evening, he was in company of his like-minded friends John O'Regan, Thomas O'Regan and George Ferdinand Shaw, all fellow Protestant students at TCD. They spent the evening discussing the 1798 Rebellion when briefly Catholics and Protestants (mainly Presbyterians and Methodists) united to try to overturn the Protestant Ascendancy in Ireland from which all of them were excluded. They were stirred by the lack of regard shown for the Irish rebels of 1798 by the contemporary nationalist movement, led by Daniel O'Connell.

The poem was published anonymously on 1 April 1843 in Thomas Davis's The Nation Newspaper although in fact its authorship was an open secret in Dublin. The Nation was the publication of the radical and bourgeois-radical wing of Ó Conaill's movement for "repeal" of the Act of Union between Ireland and Great Britain. Despite this poem, Ingram showed no nationalist sympathies at any time, maintaining that Ireland was not ready for self-government. "'The Memory of the Dead' was my only contribution to the 'Nation'," commented Ingram later. Nevertheless, before he died, Ingram made a manuscript copy of "Ninety Eight", proclaiming that he would always defend brave men who opposed tyranny.

It was set to music for voice and piano in 1845 by John Edward Pigot. Ingram's ballad was translated into Latin by Robert Yelverton Tyrrell and into Irish by Dr. Douglas Hyde. The song became a popular Irish nationalist anthem. It is one of the best-known of Irish Republican songs and often played by the piper at Republican funerals.

=== Scholarly works ===
Ingram was one of the writers selected to write "scholars" entries for the ninth edition, the tenth edition and the eleventh editions of the Encyclopædia Britannica. He wrote the entries in the Encyclopædia Britannica on Pierre Leroux, Cliffe Leslie, John Ramsay McCulloch, Georg Ludwig von Maurer, William Petty, Francois Quesnay, and Karl Heinrich Rau.

In his later career Ingram became interested in the nascent disciplines of sociology and economics. He was not a trained economist but rather a sociologist and his early economic writings dealt mainly with the Poor Law. He was a spokesman for historical economics in Britain and influenced many contemporary social and economic thinkers at that time in Great Britain, the United States, and continental Europe. His attack on classical economics encompassed its methodology and its conclusions. Ingram played an important role in the English Methodenstreit (Battle of methods), (closely associated with the Werturteilsstreit). In his 1888 History of Political Economy he used the term "economic man" as a critical description of the human being as conceived by economic theory, and he may have coined the term. From 1891 to 1896 Ingram wrote entries in Palgrave's Dictionary of Economics. He was president of the Statistical and Social Inquiry Society of Ireland between 1878 and 1880 and took over as President of the Royal Irish Academy when William Reeves died in 1892.

He also wrote on labour and trade issues, and connecting these to slavery, including domestic slavery in Europe from ancient times onward. His book, A History of Slavery and Serfdom was extremely successful, being translated into eleven languages and serving as a textbook till the 1920s. He also wrote the entries on sumptuary laws and slavery in the 9th, 10th and 11th editions of the Encyclopædia Britannica. Paul O'Higgins attributes the phrase "labour is not a commodity" to Ingram, who used it in 1880 during a Dublin meeting of the British Trades Union Congress. It appears as a principle in the preamble to the International Labour Organization's founding documents.

Ingram was active in the fields of mathematics, archaeology, the classics, economics, etymology, law, literature, medieval manuscripts, poetry, religious speculation and Shakespearean criticism. He wrote extensively on Shakespearean syntax. He worked on advancing the science of classical etymology, notably in his Greek and Latin Etymology in England.

He also wrote papers on Mexican antiques and contributed papers to mathematical societies on differential calculus and geometrical analysis.

=== Literary works ===
Ingram published several books of poetry and fiction:

- 1840 – Sonnets, Dublin University Magazine
- 1843 – The Memory of the Dead
- 1845 – The pirate's revenge, or, A tale of Don Pedro and Miss Lois Maynard, Wright's Steam Power Press, Boston 1845
- 1846 – Amelia Somers, the orphan, or, The buried alive, Wright's Steam Power Press, Boston 1846
- 1897 – Love and Sorrow, priv., Dublin 1897
- 1900 – Sonnets and Other Poems, Adam & Charles Black, London 1900

=== Political views ===
Ingram was an advocate of Home Rule for Ireland, though within the context of a more general devolution within the United Kingdom.

=== Philosophical views ===
Ingram was a firm adherent of Auguste Comte and was also a positivist. He was influenced by the German Historical School.

=== Social engagement ===
Ingram spoke up for the access of female students to Trinity College. In his function as college librarian, he first opened Trinity College Library so that the general public could see great Irish literary treasures such as the Book of Kells.

=== Death ===
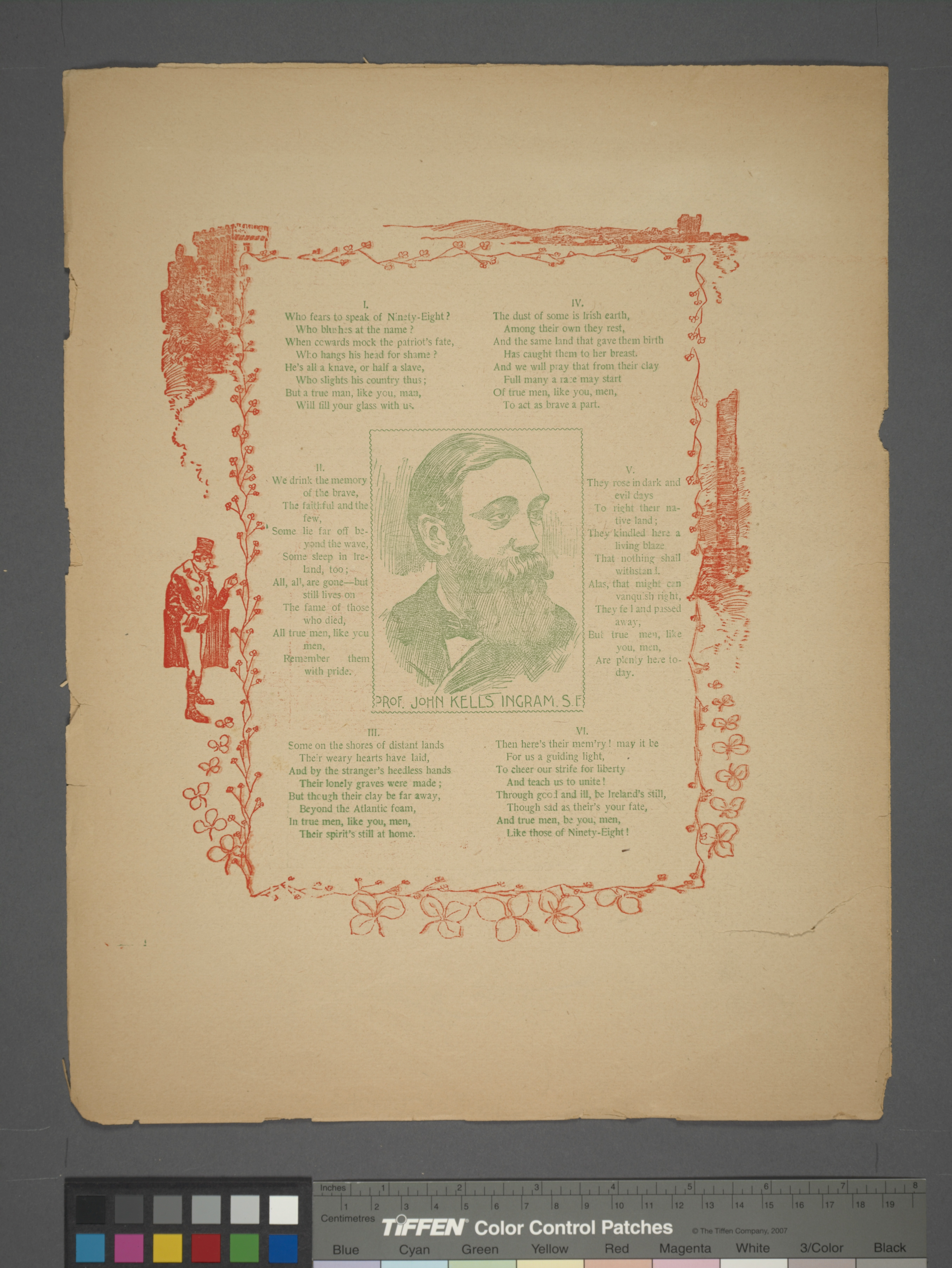
A portrait labelled as Prof John Kells Ingram illustrates late 19th century sheet music

Ingram died in 1907 in his house, 38 Upper Mount Street, Dublin, where he had lived since 1884, and was buried in Mount Jerome Cemetery.

=== Personal life ===
Ingram married Margaret Johnston Clark on 23 July 1862 at Maghera Church, County Londonderry. They had five children:

- Francis Ernest Ingram, died 1866
- Florence Beatrice Ingram, died 1918
- John Kells Ingram, junior, died in South Africa
- Madeline Townley Balfour, died 1955
- Thomas Dunbar Ingram, died in South Africa

== Posthumous tributes ==
Ingram's influence on economics was described by economist Richard Theodore Ely as:

A more humane and genial spirit has taken the place of the old dryness and hardness which once repelled so many of the best minds from the study of Economics and won for it the name of 'the dismal science'. In particular, the problem of the Proletariat, of the condition and future of the working classes- has taken a powerful hold on the feelings, as well as the intellect, of Society, and is studied in a more earnest and sympathetic spirit than at any former time.

== Publications ==
=== Non-fiction works ===
- 1843 – Geometrical properties of certain surfaces, Transactions of the Dublin University Philosophical Society, Vol. I, pp. 57–63, 1843
- 1843 – On chordal envelopes, Transactions of the Dublin University Philosophical Society, Vol. I, pp. 156–158, 1843
- 1843 – On the properties of inverse curves and surfaces, Transactions of the Dublin University Philosophical Society, Vol. I, pp. 159–162, 1843
- 1844 – XXVIII. New properties of surfaces of the second degree. To the editors of the Philosophical Magazine and Journal, Philosophical Magazine Series 3, Volume 25, Issue 165 September 1844, pages 188–192
- 1861 – On the opus majus of Roger Bacon, Proceedings of the Royal Irish Academy, Ser. 1, Vol. VII, pp. 9–15, 1857–61
- 1864 – Considerations on the State of Ireland, Edward Ponsonby, Dublin 1864
- 1874 – Greek and Latin etymology in England, Hermathena: a Dublin University review, Vol. I, No. II, pp. 407–440, 1874
- 1863 – Notes on Shakespeare's historical plays, Trinity College Library, Ms. I. 6. 40
- 1863 – A paper on the chronological order of Shakespeare's plays, Trinity College Library, Ms. I. 6. 34
- 1863 – Latin etymological notes, by John Kells Ingram, Dublin: National Library of Ireland, Ms. 253
- 1864 – A comparison between the English and Irish poor laws with respect to the conditions of relief, Journal of the Statistical and Social Inquiry Society of Ireland, Vol. IV, pp. 43–61, May 1864
- 1873 – Miscellaneous notes, Hermathena: a Dublin University review, Vol. I, No. 1, pp. 247–250, 1873
- 1875 – Commonplace book of J. K. Ingram, 1880-1. Address by Ingram to the Dublin Shakespearean Society, 10 Dec 1875, Trinity College Library, Mss. I. 6. 36–37
- 1875 – On thama and thamakis in Pindar, Hermathena: a Dublin University review, Vol. II, No. III, pp. 217–227, 1875
- 1875 – Address at the opening of the twenty-ninth session; the organisation of charity and the education of the children of the state, Journal of the Statistical and Social Inquiry Society of Ireland, Vol. VI, pp. 449–473, December 1875
- 1876 – Bishop Butler and Mr. Matthew Arnold, a note, Hermathena: a Dublin University review, Vol. II, No. IV, pp. 505–506, 1876
- 1876 – Greek and Latin etymology in England, No. II., Hermathena: a Dublin University review, Vol. II, No. IV, pp. 428–442, 1876
- 1876 – Additional facts and arguments on the boarding-out of pauper children, Journal of the Statistical and Social Inquiry Society of Ireland, Vol. VI, pp. 503–523, February 1876
  (Later published as: – Additional facts and arguments on the boarding-out of pauper children: being a paper read before the Statistical and Social Inquiry Society of Ireland on Tuesday, 18 January, Dublin, Edward Ponsonby, Dublin 1876)
- 1876 – Address of the President of Section F of the British Association, Journal of the Royal Statistical Society, August 1876
- 1879 – [The Present Position and Prospects of Political Economy, Statistical and Social Inquiry Society of Ireland, 1879
- 1880 – Work and the workman : being an address to the Trades Union Congress in Dublin, September 1880 , Eason & Son, Dublin 1928
- 1881 – Report of Council on Mr. Jephson's suggestions as to Census for 1881, Statistical and Social Inquiry Society of Ireland, 1881
- 1881 – Etymological notes on Liddell and Scott's lexicon, Hermathena: a Dublin University review, Vol. IV, No. VII, pp. 105–120, 1881
- 1881 – Work and the workman: an address to the Trades' Union Congress, Journal of the Statistical and Social Inquiry Society of Ireland, Vol. VIII, pp. 106–123, January 1881
- 1882 – On Two Collections of Mediaeval Moralized Tales, Dublin 1882
- 1883 – Notes on Latin lexicography, Hermathena: a Dublin University review, Vol, IV, No, VIII, pp. 310–316, 1882, No. IX, pp. 402–412, 1883
- 1896 – An address delivered before the Royal Irish Academy on 24 February 1896, Royal Irish Academy, Dublin 1896
- 1888 – A correction, Hermathena: a Dublin University review, Vol. VI, No. XIV, pp. 366–367, 1888
- 1888 – On a fragment of an ante-Hieronymian version of the Gospels, in the Library of Trinity College, Dublin. See also Ser.2, Vol. III, Pp. 374–5, 1845–7, Proceedings of the Royal Irish Academy, Polite Literature and AntiquitiesSer. 2, Vol. II, pp. 22–23, 1879–88
- 1888 – A History of Political Economy Edinburgh, Adam & Charles Black, London 1888; Macmillan, New York 1894; McMaster University Archive for the History of Economic Thought, number ingram1888 (on line)], Dodo Press, 2008, ISBN 978-1-4099-5901-4
- 1888 – Essays in Political Economy
- 1889 – Memoir of the late William Neilson Hancock, Journal of the Statistical and Social Inquiry Society of Ireland, Vol. IX, pp. 384–393, August 1889
- 1889 – Memoir of the late William Neilson Hancock, LL.D., Q.C, Statistical and Social Inquiry Society of Ireland, 1881 –
- 1891 – Presidential Address reviewing the affairs of the Academy since its foundation, Proceedings of the Royal Irish Academy, Ser. 3, Vol. II, (Appendix) pp. 107–28, 1891–3
- 1892 – The past and present work of the Royal Irish Academy : an address delivered at the stated meeting of that body, 30 November 1892, Ponsonby & Weldrick, Dublin 1892
- 1893 – Etymological notes on Lewis and Short's Latin dictionary -, Hermathena: a Dublin University review, Vol. VIII, No. XIX, pp. 326–343, 1893
- 1893 – English translation of the first three books of Thomas à Kempis – De imitatione Christi – by JKI
  (16 editions published between 1893 and 1987 in English, held by 331 libraries worldwide)
- 1893 – Etymological notes on Lewis and Short's Latin dictionary -
- 1895 – A History of Slavery and Serfdom, Adam & Charles Black, London 1895; Macmillan, New York 1895 (reprinted Lightning Source (2007), ISBN 1-4304-4390-1)
- 1901 – Human nature and morals according to Auguste Comte. With notes illustrative of the principles of Positivism. Adam & Charles Black, London. 1901.
- 1900 – Outlines of history of religion, London 1900, General Books, 2009, ISBN 978-0-217-26725-0
- 1904 – Practical Morals. A Treatise on Universal Education, London 1904
- 1905 – The Final Transition. A Sociological Study, London 1905

=== Correspondence ===
- Richard Congreve, six letters (and c.150 of Congreve's to Ingram), 1861–1899. (BL Add. MSS. 45228, 45233).
- Richard Theodore Ely, four letters, 1880s. (Ely papers, University of Wisconsin, Madison).
- William Ewart Gladstone, nine letters, 1873. (B. M. Add. MSS. 44437-44438).
- William Stanley Jevons, two letters, 1881. (Jevons papers, Manchester JRUL)
- Thomas Edward Cliffe Leslie, one letter, 1878. (London UL, AL 63).

Academic offices
Preceded by Thomas Stack	Regius Professor of Greek at Trinity College Dublin; 1866–1880	Succeeded by Robert Yelverton Tyrrell
