= Kottabos (literary magazine) =

Irish literary magazine

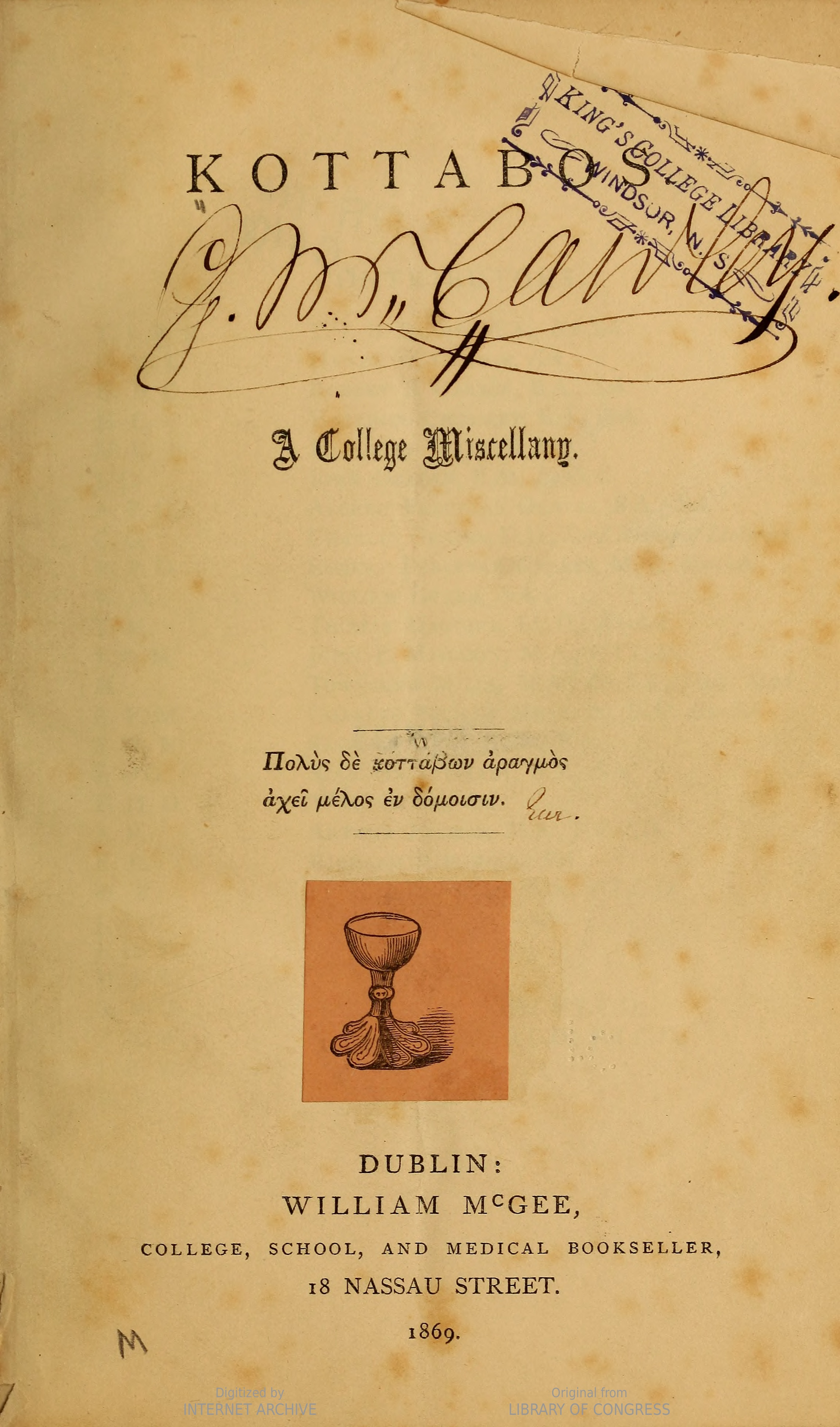
- Cover page of first issue
- Founding editor: Robert Yelverton Tyrrell
- Categories: Literary magazine
- Frequency: Triannual
- Publisher: W. McGee
- First issue: 1869; 156 years ago
- Final issue: 1893; 132 years ago
- Language: English, Greek, Latin
- OCLC: 5000773

Kottabos was an Irish literary magazine, published from 1869 to 1893 at Trinity College, Dublin. Over the years many authors contributed to the journal, like Edward Dowden, Alfred Perceval Graves and Oscar Wilde, who had early work published in it, during his period at Trinity. The magazine contained translations, parodies, lyrics, and light verse, mostly written in English, but also in Greek and Latin. Most contributions were of a "playful character."

The magazine was published in Dublin by W. McGee and appeared three times a year.

The name "Kottabos" was taken from the Greek drinking game kottabos.

Robert Yelverton Tyrrell was the first editor-in-chief.

Adolphus Ward and Alfred Rayney Waller, in their The Cambridge History of English and American Literature, say that Kottabos is "perhaps the cream of Irish academic wit and scholarship."

== Editors and issues ==
Tyrrell explained in 1906 that he started "a College miscellany of Greek and Latin verse (mainly translations), and of English pieces, verse and prose (mainly original)" shortly after his election as a fellow of Trinity College in 1868. He soon obtained the help of John Martley.

The journal was issued three times a year, corresponding to the three College terms. The first two issues were published in 1869. According to Tyrrell a first volume was issued in 1874, at the end of four years, embracing twelve numbers. Then in 1877 and 1881 two further volumes appeared, with an equal number of parts. This made a total of 36 numbers.

In 1888 the magazine was revived under the editorship of J. B. Bury. He edited a volume that was completed in 1891. The last volume, edited by George Wilkins, appeared in 1895. The total numbers issued thus became fifty.

== Contributors ==
Contributors to Kottabos were among many others:

- William Macneile Dixon (1866–1946), author and academic. He contributed for instance:
  - 1891, a poem, titled "An Allegory"
  - 1891, a poem, titled "Lilies"
- Edward Dowden (1843–1913), poet (contributed as: E. D.). Some of his contributions were:
  - fourth issue (1870), a poem, titled "David and Michal"
  - fifth issue (1870), a poem, titled "A Farewell"
  - sixth issue (1871), a poem, titled "In a June Night"
  - seventh issue (1871), three poems, titled "Songs"
- Alfred Perceval Graves (1846–1931), poet and songwriter, who contributed to Kottabos as an undergraduate with the initials "A. P. ." Among his contributions were:
  - first issue (1869), a very short text
  - fifth issue (1870), a poem, titled "Song"
  - sixth issue (1871), a poem, titled "Grace"
  - seventh issue (1871), a poem (in Latin), titled "Mors Ultima Linea Rerum"
  - 14th issue (1873), a poem "Divini Gloria Ruris"
  - 16th issue (1874), a very small contribution entitled "Versus impariter iuncti"
- Richard Frederick Littledale (1833-1890), clergyman and writer, contributed (as R. F. L.):
  - the essay "Oxford Solar Myth. A Contribution to Comparative Mythology."
- Standish James O'Grady (1846–1928), historian (S. O'G.) contributed:
  - the poem "The Old Parson and the New. A Lay Addressed to Divinity Students" in the first issue of Kottabos (1869)
- John Todhunter (1839–1916), poet (J. T.). He contributed:
  - the poem titled "Louise"
- Oscar Wilde (1854–1900), poet and playwright, who contributed as "O. F. O'F. W. W." to the second volume (1877):
  - "A fragment from the Agamemnon of Aeschylos"
  - the poem "A Night Vision"

== Echoes ==
In 1906 Robert Tyrrell published Echoes from Kottabos, with the editorial help of Sir Edward Sullivan, 2nd Baronet (1852-1928), as an anthology for the magazine:

- Tyrrell, R. Y.; Sullivan, Sir Edward (1906). Echoes from Kottabos. London: E. Grant Richards. hdl:2027/uc2.ark:/13960/t6g15wv3f. OCLC 4311831 (all editions).

In the "Preface" Tyrrell shortly describes the history of the magazine. He also explains the title. The editors remark that a complete set of Kottabos now (1906) is very rare (they guess that not more than half a dozen are extant).

The book is split into three parts–Verse, Prose and Latin rhymes. Classical exercises were not admitted, because a selection from these had been published in elsewhere. Special mention is made of the prose contribution titled "Oxford Solar Myth. A Contribution to Comparative Mythology" by the Rev. R. Littledale.

== Sources ==
- Jeffares, A. Norman (1982). Anglo-Irish Literature. MacMillan International Higher Education. p. 192. ISBN 9781349168552.
- O'Donoghue, David J. (1892–1893). The Poets of Ireland. A Biographical Dictionary with Bibliographical Particulars. London: published by the author.
- Tyrrell, Robert Yelverton, ed. (1882). Dublin Translations into Greek and Latin Verse. Dublin / London: Hodges Figgis & Co. / Longmans Green & Co. OCLC 23166174 (all editions).
- Ward, Adolphus William; Waller, Alfred Rayney, eds. (1907–1921). "University Journalism : Scottish and Irish University Journals". The Cambridge History of English and American Literature. Vol. 14. Archived from the original on 2022-04-13.
