= Robert Yelverton Tyrrell =

Irish classical scholar (1844–1914)

Robert Yelverton Tyrrell FBA
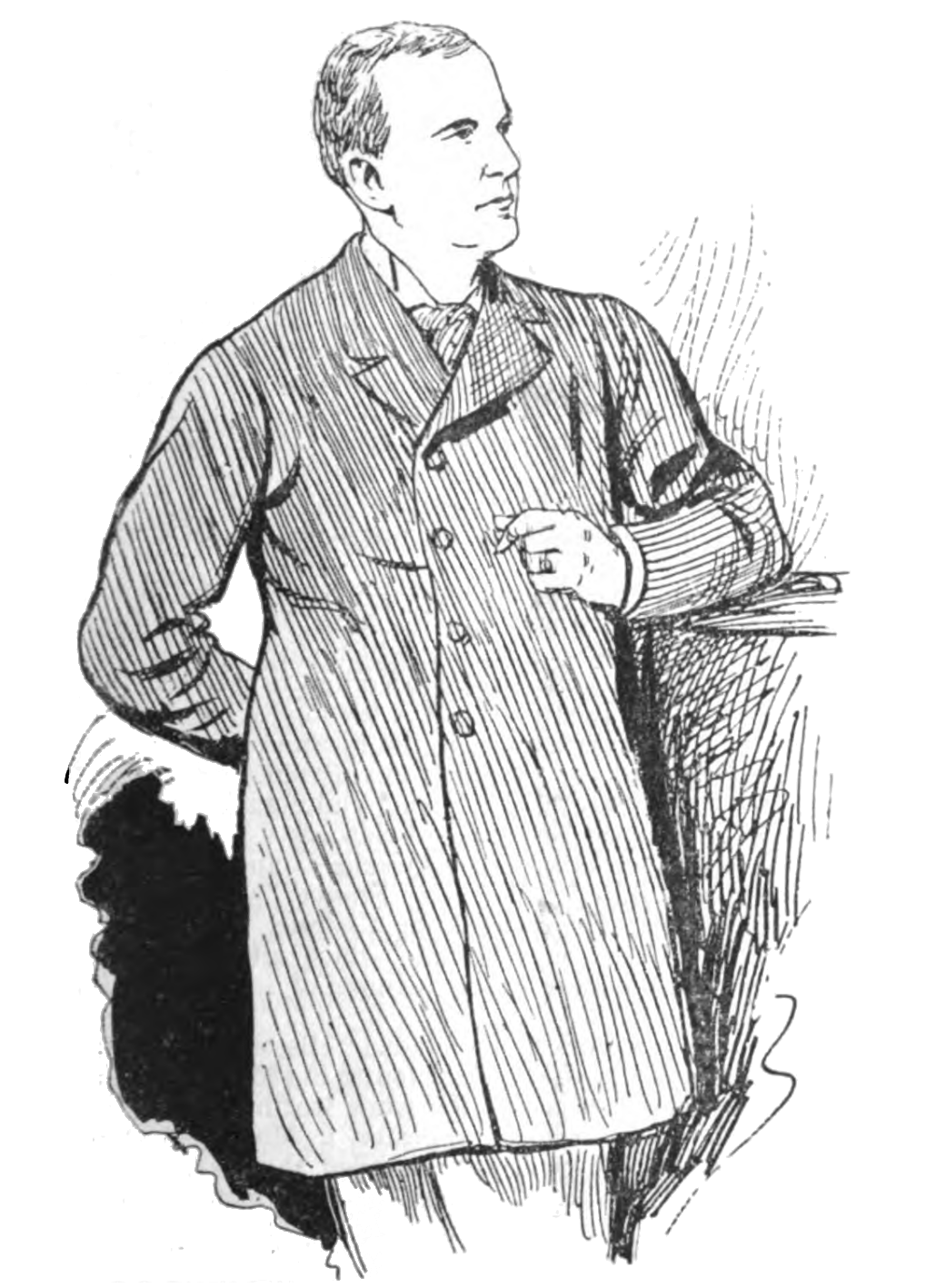
- Drawn in 1893 by Walter C. Mills of the London Daily Graphic
- Born: 21 January 1844; Ballingarry, County Tipperary, Ireland
- Died: 19 September 1914 (aged 70); Greystones, County Wicklow, Ireland
- Occupation: Classical scholar
- Spouse: Ada Shaw (m. 1874)
- Relatives: George Tyrrell (cousin); Richard Hanson (grandson); Lucius Thompson-McCausland (grandson)

Academic background
- Education: Trinity College Dublin

Academic work
- Institutions: Trinity College Dublin
- Notable students: Ernest Alton; J. B. Bury; Francis Ysidro Edgeworth; Louis Claude Purser; William Ridgeway; W. J. M. Starkie; Oscar Wilde
- Influenced: Oliver St John Gogarty

Regius Professor of Greek, University of Dublin
- In office 1880–1898
- Preceded by: John Kells Ingram
- Succeeded by: J. B. Bury

Robert Yelverton Tyrrell FBA (/ˈtɪrəl/ TIRR-əl; 21 January 1844 – 19 September 1914) was an Irish classical scholar who was Regius Professor of Greek at Trinity College Dublin. He was a prominent figure in the "Dublin School" of classical scholarship, responsible for Trinity's advancement in prestige in that subject from the late 1860s, known particularly for his seven-volume edition (largely made with his former student, Louis Claude Purser) of the letters of the Roman statesman and philosopher Cicero.

Born in Ballingarry, County Tipperary, Tyrrell was the son of a Church of Ireland curate, who died five years after Tyrrell's birth. His mother, Elizabeth, moved the family to Dublin, where Tyrrell was educated by his elder brothers and, briefly, at a local private school. He displayed an early talent for classical studies, particularly the composition of Greek and Latin verse, and entered Trinity College Dublin at the unusually young age of sixteen. He was a distinguished student, graduating in 1864 and attaining a fellowship in 1868.

Tyrrell became Professor of Latin in 1871 and Regius Professor of Greek in 1880. He played a leading role in the establishment of the literary journal Hermathena as well as the college miscellany Kottabos, which collected humorous writings, often in Latin and Greek. After stepping down as Regius Professor in 1898, he became the college's Public Orator in 1899 and Professor of Ancient History in 1900. He was appointed as one of the founding fellows of the British Academy in 1901.

Several of Tyrrell's students went on to become influential in scholarship and the arts, including J. B. Bury, Francis Ysidro Edgeworth and William Ridgeway. He also taught Oscar Wilde, and supported him after Wilde was incarcerated for homosexual activity in 1895. As an academic, he promoted the detailed study of literary texts over that of historical and archaeological material, and was credited with a prominent role in improving the reputation and quality of classical studies at Trinity. He suffered from ill-health, brought on by an attack of thrombosis, from 1899, and died in 1914 at his home near Dublin.

== Early life ==
Robert Yelverton Tyrrell was born on 21 January 1844 in Ballingarry in County Tipperary, Ireland. His middle name was taken from his godmother's surname; she was a descendant of the judge, legal scholar and peer Barry Yelverton. Robert Tyrrell was a first cousin to the modernist writer and excommunicated Jesuit priest George Tyrrell.

Tyrrell was the son of Elizabeth Tyrrell (née Shea) and of Henry Tyrrell, a curate in the Church of Ireland at Ballingarry. Soon after Robert's birth, Henry Tyrrell was appointed as rector of Kinnitty in County Offaly. He died in 1849 of cholera, having caught the disease in Dublin, where it had broken out the same year and to where he had travelled in order to administer the last rites to his brother-in-law. The remaining family, consisting of three sons, three daughters and Tyrrell's mother, moved to Dublin.

Tyrrell was mostly educated at home by his two elder brothers, though he spent six weeks at Flynn's School, a private school on Hume Street in Dublin. According to an 1893 portrait of Tyrrell by his former student, Henry Hinkson, in The Critic, he had an unhappy time at the school, partly due to his skill at composing verses in Latin and Greek: this attracted the ire of his teacher, who considered verse composition frivolous. Hinkson also wrote that it aroused the jealousy of Tyrrell's schoolmates, requiring him to "make amends for his superior attainments by a correspondingly deft use of his fists".

In 1860, at the unusually young age of sixteen, Tyrrell matriculated at Trinity College Dublin. All three Tyrrell brothers studied classics with distinction at Trinity; Robert Tyrrell obtained a classical scholarship at the end of his first year: a rare achievement for a first-year student, particularly one of seventeen. (Note: Sturgeon and Clinton identify Tyrrell as the first Trinity student to win such a scholarship in his first year.) He graduated in 1864 with a Double First, achieving the college's top marks in classics and fourth-highest marks in logic and ethics, and was also awarded the Vice-Chancellor's Prize in Greek Verse for a play about the Alexandrian mathematician Hypatia. In 1867, alongside two fellow Trinity scholars (Thomas J. Bellingham Brady and Maxwell Cormac Cullinan), Tyrrell published Hesperidum susurri ('Whispers of the Hesperides'), a volume of English verse translated into Latin.

== Academic career ==
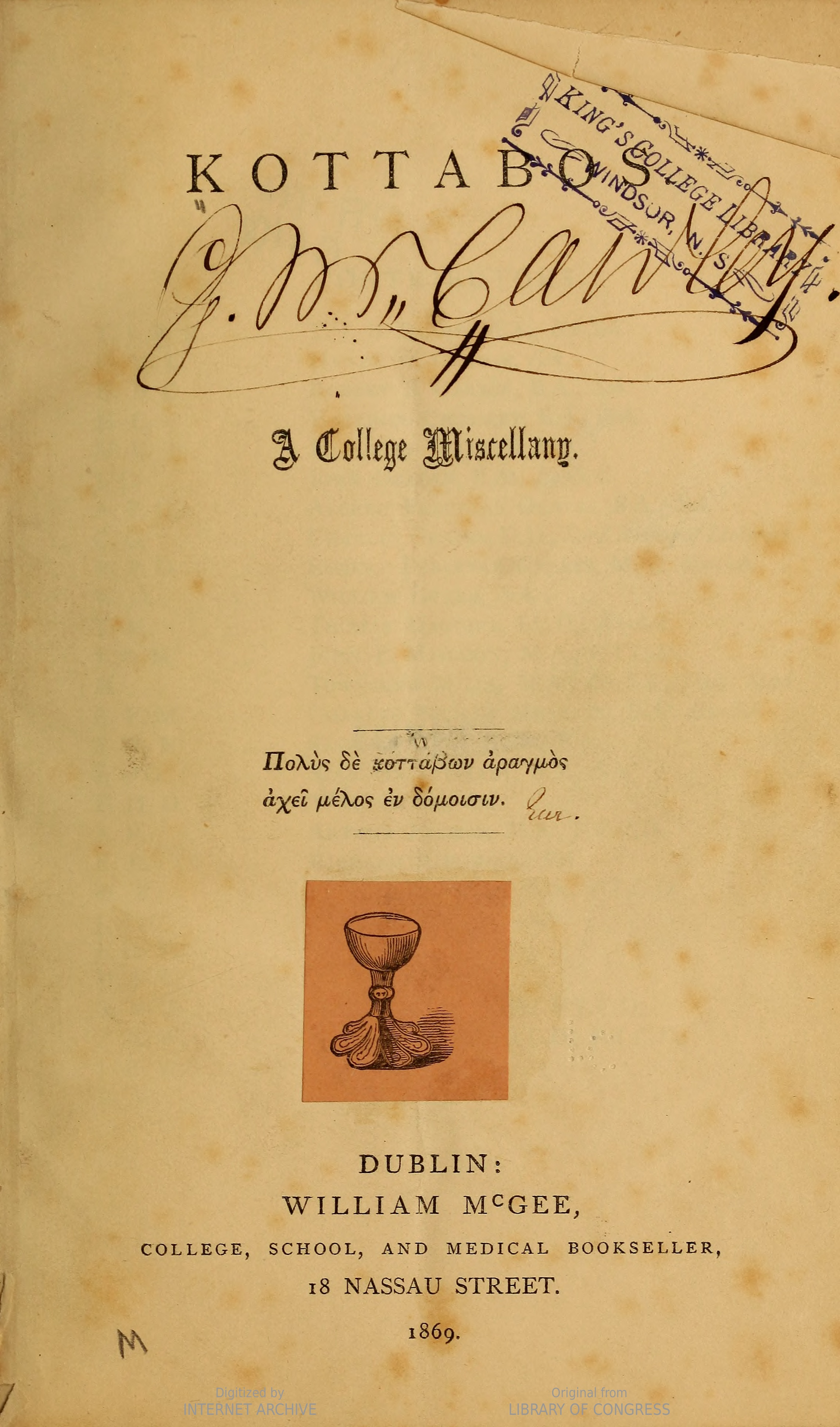
The cover of the first edition of Kottabos, published in 1869 under Tyrrell's editorship. The wine-cup on the cover and the epigraph (from a fragment by Euripides) reference the ancient game of kottabos, played by flicking the dregs of a wine-cup at other participants. (Note: Stanford translates the fragment as "There was abundant splashing of wine thrown in kottabos / And music resounded in the halls".)

=== Early career ===
Tyrrell twice won prizes in the examinations to become a fellow of Trinity College, but did not secure the position until his third attempt in 1868. Classical studies had held relatively little prominence at Trinity until the 1860s; few classics graduates had applied for fellowships at the college, preferring instead to seek careers in law or public service. Tyrrell's appointment, along with those of John Pentland Mahaffy in 1864 and Arthur Palmer in 1867, marked the beginning of a period in which the subject expanded greatly in numbers, publications and prestige. These academics became known as the "Dublin School" of classics. Tyrrell was elected Professor of Latin in 1871, succeeding William Hugh Ferrar, who had died in office. Tyrrell's lecture style was spontaneous, relying on question-and-answer with his audience: his student Louis Claude Purser later wrote that the lectures were highly effective, but not "by any means highly systematic", and that they might have been condemned as mere "desultory conversations" by an educational inspector.

In 1869, Tyrrell co-founded (with Edward Sullivan) and became the first editor of the Trinity literary magazine Kottabos, which William Stanford, Tyrrell's biographer, describes as "a polyglot miscellany of jeux d'ésprit ". He remained its editor-in-chief for all the editions of its first run, which ended in 1881. His contributions to Kottabos included reports on college cricket matches written in the style of the ancient Greek historian Thucydides. He was also a founding member of the editorial board of Hermathena, a more serious academic journal, established in 1873. (Note: Jeffares 1982, p. 192. Jeffares incorrectly gives 1874 as the first year of Hermathena.) (Note: The other members were John Kells Ingram and John Pentland Mahaffy, making with Tyrrell the three Dublin professors of classical subjects (Greek, Ancient History and Latin respectively), as well as the mathematician Benjamin Williamson.) He contributed to the first issue a review of John H. Hogan's edition of Euripides's Medea: the review was, in Stanford's words, "a savagely sarcastic scarification of Hogan's grammatical and metrical lapses". Tyrrell wrote that his intention was to discourage Hogan from editing any further works of the playwright "until he has made himself acquainted with the rudiments of Greek accidence and the structure of an iambic trimeter". (Note: Stanford 1973, p. 2, quoting Tyrrell 1873b, p. 253.)

In 1879, Tyrrell published the first volume of an edition of the letters of the Roman statesman and philosopher Cicero. This was the first attempt in an English-language work to establish the date of each of Cicero's letters and to arrange them in chronological order, though German scholars had attempted the same project and previous studies had attempted to date individual letters within the corpus. Unusually for the time, Tyrrell's edition rejected the traditional practice of grouping letters by their addressee, (Note: This divided the corpus into four sub-groups: Ad Atticum, Ad Brutum, Ad Familiares, and Ad Quintum fratrem.) referring to each of the 931 letters by a number.

=== Regius Professor of Greek ===
From 1880 to 1898, Tyrrell was Regius Professor of Greek, succeeding John Kells Ingram, who became the college librarian. From 1885, Purser began to work with him on his editions of Cicero's letters, though only Tyrrell was credited on the 1886 publication of the second volume, and he remained the "senior partner", listed before Purser, for all succeeding volumes. In 1887, he used his own name to have a textual note on the Frogs of Aristophanes, written by A. E. Housman – who had failed his degree at Oxford and was working at the Patent Office (Note: Housman failed the final exams of 1880, but had returned to Oxford in 1881 and 1882 and successfully sat the examinations for a Pass Degree, the lowest classification available.) – published in The Classical Review; in 1892, he sponsored Housman's successful application to be Professor of Latin at University College London. (Note: Beard 2002, p. 107; the note is Tyrrell 1887.) In 1893, Tyrrell delivered the Percy Turnbull Lectures at Johns Hopkins University in Baltimore, which he published as Latin Poetry. (Note: Purser 1916; Stanford 1978, pp. 13–14. For the title of the lectures, see "Notes". The Critic. Vol. 22, no. 569. 14 January 1893. p. 25.)

Tyrrell was a lifelong friend and supporter of Richard Claverhouse Jebb, professor of Greek initially at the University of Glasgow and, from 1889, at Cambridge, and often sided with him in academic debates, particularly against Mahaffy. In a letter to Jebb of February 1883, Tyrrell congratulated him for "show[ing] Mahaffy in his true light, with slovenly Greek and disingenuous arguments"; from 1884, Tyrrell and Mahaffy quarrelled over the edition of the Greek historian Herodotus made by the historian Archibald Sayce, leading to what Stanford calls a "minor civil war" between their respective acolytes at Trinity.

=== Later career ===
Tyrrell left the Regius Professorship in 1898; he was succeeded by his former student J. B. Bury, then appointed in 1899 as the university's Public Orator and, in 1900, as Professor of Ancient History. (Note: Chisholm 1922, p. 827; Purser 1927, p. 541. Stanford states that Tyrrell obtained the two offices in the same year, but does not specify which.) The move was not regarded as a good fit with Tyrrell's academic interests – he was a literary scholar rather than a historian – but may have been intended to prevent Bury from leaving Trinity to seek a professorship elsewhere. Stanford further explains it through the belief that "in those days, Fellows of Trinity were deemed to be omniscient".

Tyrrell suffered from thrombosis of the legs from 1899, which forced him to give up his previous participation in sport (particularly rackets and tennis), affected his physical and mental energy and, in Stanford's words, "ravaged his fine features". In 1904, he was considered for the position of college provost, though ultimately passed over in favour of Anthony Traill, who was appointed by the Prime Minister, Arthur Balfour, in March. In the aftermath of Traill's appointment, Tyrrell was co-opted as a Senior Fellow, which required him to resign both his professorship and his office as Public Orator. Tyrrell was also elected as the college registrar in the same year, with a total salary (in 1906) of £1,386 14s (equivalent to £145,800 in 2025). In 1913, by which point his health was in decline, he was not re-elected as registrar, and was instead appointed senior dean and catechist, responsible for the religious education of the student body. (Note: Stanford 1978, p. 9. See § Personal life below.)

Tyrrell was a Commissioner of Education for Ireland; (Note: He held office in 1903: see "The Commissioners of Education for Ireland", Thom's Irish Almanac and Official Directory of the United Kingdom of Great Britain and Ireland, A. Thom, 1903, p. 842.) he was called to testify in 1899 before a royal commission on the state of education on the island and the possibility of reforming it. He was also chosen, in 1901, as one of the founding fellows of the British Academy. He died on 19 September 1914, at his home in Greystones, in County Wicklow near Dublin, after what Purser describes as a "tedious illness".

== Personal life ==
a, misera sortis,
pondere fessa!
a, temere mortis
viam ingressa!
tollite facile
onus tam bellum
corpus tam gracile,
tamque tenellum.

— From Tyrrell's Latin translation of "The Bridge of Sighs" (1844) by Thomas Hood (Note: The original passage, in English, reads: One more unfortunate, Weary of breath Rashly unfortunate, Gone to her death; Take her up tenderly, Lift her with care, Fashion'd so slenderly, Young and so fair.)

Tyrrell married the poet Ada Shaw, the daughter of his Trinity colleague, the economist and journalist George Ferdinand Shaw, in 1874; they had three sons and three daughters. His grandsons included the bishop Richard Hanson and, by his daughter Ada, the economist Lucius Thompson-McCausland. (Note: Stanford 1978, p. 20, with n. 1. For Thompson-McCausland, see "Mr. L. P. Thompson-McCausland". The Times. 25 February 1984. p. 10.) Tyrrell was known for his sarcastic wit and opposition to temperance hotels, which served no alcohol; he compared the concept with "a celibate brothel". His writings were often parodic in nature, including pastiches of Herodotus and, frequently, of the English poet Robert Browning. He was a friend of the Jesuit priest and poet Gerard Manley Hopkins, who described him as "a fine scholar and an amiable man, free from every touch of pedantry". (Note: In a letter, quoted in Stanford 1978, p. 20.) Who's Who listed his chief recreation as "light literature and the drama": he expressed regret, in an 1890 commentary on Cicero, that no historical romance had yet been written on the relationship between the poet Catullus and his lover Lesbia.

Tyrrell was agnostic, though Stanford describes him as a "mild" one. In 1935, Newport J. D. White, who also served as catechist of Trinity, recalled giving one of Tyrrell's sons a failing grade in his religious examination: while Traill, whose son had received the same result, castigated White for daring to fail a fellow's son, Tyrrell thanked him, saying that "a gentleman's education" should include a grounding in Christianity. (Note: Stanford 1978, p. 9, n. 6, quoting White 1935, p. 34) In 1903, during a period of debate over the "Irish University Question", (Note: The prospect of creating a university in Ireland that would be accepted by the Catholic church and population: Trinity was resolutely both Protestant and Unionist, though Catholics were accepted as students. Efforts to found a Catholic counterpart in the 1850s had failed, and other non-denominational universities (such as the Royal University of Ireland) were rejected by most Catholic clergy and students.) Tyrrell published a sonnet called "Holy Ireland", in which he denigrated the influence of Catholicism upon the country. He expressed the same opinion in a book review of the same year, and attracted further censure when he attempted to write to defend himself from complaints against his words.

== Honours, legacy and assessment ==
Tyrrell was awarded honorary degrees or doctorates by the universities of Edinburgh (in 1884), Queen's University of Ireland and Cambridge (in 1892), Oxford (in 1893), St Andrew's (in 1906) and Durham (in 1907). He is most remembered for his edition of the letters of Cicero, though the work is generally considered to have been made largely obsolete by twentieth-century developments in textual criticism. The Cambridge Concise History of English Literature describes Tyrrell's "devotion to ancient and modern literature ... combined with a keen wit and a felicitous style". In 1941, Stanford described Tyrrell's as "the finest career in classical literature that the College [Trinity] has yet known".

As an academic, Tyrrell advocated a conservative view of the curriculum characterised by "pure scholarship", a view of classical research which prioritised linguistic expertise and the study of ancient literary texts. In this he was supported by his Trinity colleagues Palmer, Thomas Maguire and John Isaac Beare, as well as Jebb and other Cambridge scholars, and opposed by Mahaffy, Bury and other historians, including Sayce and several of his Oxford colleagues. In the words of a twentieth-century history of Trinity, Tyrrell and his supporters "regarded history as a spare-time amusement and archaeology as mere manual labour". He criticised other classical scholars for what he considered over-reliance upon the discoveries of archaeologists, writing negatively of "Schliemannism" and ironically comparing the Linear B tablets discovered at Knossos by Arthur Evans with the "baleful signs" given to the hero Bellerophon in the Iliad. Tyrrell's work, along with that of other academics of the "Dublin School", has been praised for its mixture of rigour, common sense and humour, and rated as an important counterweight to the influence of German scholarship in British classical academia.

The publication of Kottabos was credited with helping to shift Trinity's reputation as the "silent sister", a disparaging nickname granted on account of the college's comparatively small record of scholarly work by comparison with the other ancient universities of the British Isles. Similarly, his 1867 co-publication of Hesperidum susurri – its name referring to the nymphs who lived at the far western edge of the world in Greek mythology – was the first substantial work of translation from English into Latin to come from Dublin: such exercises were considered a hallmark of the most prestigious classical education in the period.

=== Notable students ===
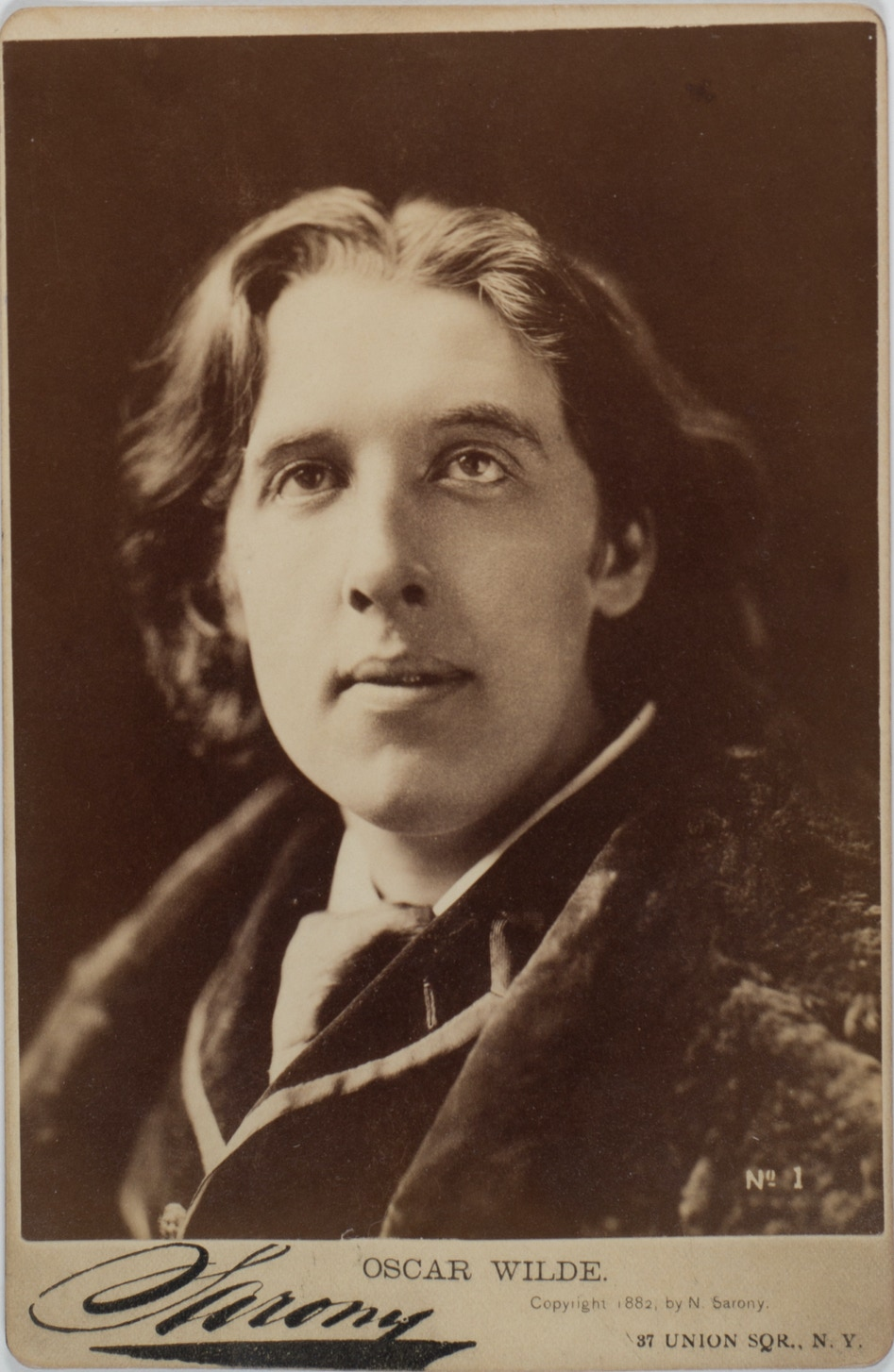
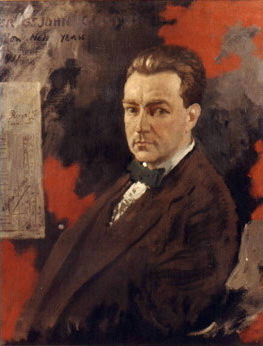
Some of Tyrrell's students and followers: Oscar Wilde (left) and Oliver St. John Gogarty

Among Tyrrell's students were the future economist Francis Ysidro Edgeworth, who graduated from Trinity in 1865, and the Jesuit priest John Sullivan. He also taught the archaeologist William Ridgeway, the translator and educationalist W. J. M. Starkie, the classicists J. I. Beare, W. A. Goligher and G. W. Mooney, the papyrologist Josiah Gilbert Smyly, and Ernest Alton, later provost of Trinity. Other future literary figures, including the poets Arthur Perceval Graves and T. W. Rolleston, the folklorist John Millington Synge and the writer William Kirkpatrick Magee, studied at Trinity during his tenure and may have attended his lectures.

Along with Mahaffy and other fellows, Tyrrell was a mentor of Oliver St. John Gogarty, a medical student with a penchant for poetry and classical literature, who later became a writer. On hearing an obscene limerick said to have been composed by Gogarty, Tyrrell, who enjoyed the irreverence of Latin epigrammatists like Martial and Catullus, praised Gogarty with a quotation from Shakespeare for his "service of the antique world". (Note: Lyons 1984, p. 2. Lyons erroneously gives the quotation's origin as Hamlet; it is from As You Like It, Act 2, Scene 3. On Tyrrell and Latin epigrammatists, see "Belles Lettres". The Westminster Magazine. Vol. 144. 1895. p. 116.) (Note: The limerick ran: There was a young man of St. John's Who attempted to roger the swans: "No!" said the porter, "You may roger my daughter, But the birds are reserved for the Dons.") Tyrrell appears in Gogarty's semi-autobiographical novels As I Was Going Down Sackville Street and Tumbling in the Hay: in the latter, Gogarty describes him as a finely dressed epicure, popular with the students, and as "a worthy, if ever there was one – kalos k'agathos, which ... is the Greek for a gentleman". (Note: Stanford 1978, p. 18, with n. 13, quoting Gogarty 1939, p. 75.) Gogarty also briefly mourns Tyrrell, along with Mahaffy and the Trinity philosopher Robert Macran, in his 1939 poem "Elegy on the Archpoet William Butler Yeats, Lately Dead".

Tyrrell also taught the poet and playwright Oscar Wilde, who read classics at Trinity between 1871 and 1874. According to Wilde's friend and biographer Frank Harris, Wilde described Mahaffy as a greater influence upon him, but Tyrrell as a better scholar: Harris quotes Wilde as calling him "intensely sympathetic and crammed with knowledge" and joking that "if he had known less, he would have been a poet". After Wilde was imprisoned in May 1895 for gross indecency, (Note: For the charge and the date, see Bristow 2016, p. 41.) (Note: Gross indecency was a term used to criminalise sexual acts between men which did not involve penetration or attempted penetration.) Tyrrell signed Harris's petition of November of that year to Aretas Akers-Douglas, the Home Secretary, calling for his release; he later wrote a positive review of De Profundis, Wilde's letter-memoir of his imprisonment.

== Works ==
Tyrrell's published works include:

- Brady, Thomas J. Bellingham; Tyrrell, Robert Yelverton; Cullinan, Maxwell Cormac (1867). Hesperidum Susurri [Whispers of the Hesperides] (in Latin). London: Rivington. OCLC 2763307.
- Tyrrell, Robert Yelverton, ed. (1871). The Bacchae of Euripides: A Revision of the Text and Commentary. London: Longmans, Green, Reader and Dyer. OCLC 5040927.
- — (1873a). "Notes on the Letters of Cicero to Atticus". Hermathenea. 1 (1): 195–209. ISSN 0018-0750. JSTOR 23036315.
- — (1873b). "Mr. Hogan's Edition of the Medea". Hermathenea. 1 (1): 251–253. ISSN 0018-0750. JSTOR 23036322.
- — (1875). "Atakta" [Irregularities]. Hermathenea. 2 (3): 107–123. ISSN 0018-0750. JSTOR 23036431.
- —, ed. (1879). The Correspondence of Cicero. Vol. 1. Dublin: Hodges, Foster & Figgis. OCLC 4452818. (Note: The full title was The Correspondence of Cicero: Arranged According to Its Chronological Order, with a Revision of the Text, a Commentary, and Introductory Essays on the Life of Cicero and the Style of His Letters.)
- —, ed. (1881). The Miles Gloriosus of Plautus: A Revised Text, with Notes. London: Macmillan & Co. OCLC 504226469.
- —, ed. (1883). The Acharnians of Aristophanes Translated into English Verse. Dublin: Hodges, Figgis & Co. ISBN 978-3-385-32799-3. OCLC 504226469.
- —, ed. (1883). Dublin Translations into Greek and Latin Verse. Dublin: Hodges, Figgis & Co. OCLC 858849467.
- — (December 1887). "Further Note on Aristophanes, Ranae 1028". The Classical Review. 1 (10): 313. ISSN 0009-840X. JSTOR 692878.
- — (January 1888). "The Old School of the Classics and the New: A Dialogue of the Dead". Fortnightly Review: 42–59. ISSN 2043-2887.
- —, ed. (1886). The Correspondence of Cicero. Vol. 2. Dublin: Hodges, Foster & Figgis. OCLC 1042383632 – via Internet Archive.
- —; Purser, Louis Claude, eds. (1890). The Correspondence of Cicero. Vol. 3. Dublin: Hodges, Figgis & Co. OCLC 1042383632 – via Internet Archive.
- — (February 1893). "Review: Grant Allen on the 'Attis' of Catullus". The Classical Review. 7 (1/2): 44–45. doi:10.1017/S0009840X00196799. ISSN 0009-840X. JSTOR 691369.
- — (February 1893). "Timocreon 1, 12". The Classical Review. 7 (1/2): 21. ISSN 0009-840X. JSTOR 691353.
- —; Purser, Louis Claude, eds. (1894). The Correspondence of Cicero. Vol. 4. Dublin: Hodges, Figgis & Co. OCLC 1042383632 – via Internet Archive.
- — (1895). Latin Poetry. New York: Houghton, Mifflin & Co. OCLC 705983768.
- —; Purser, Louis Claude, eds. (1897). The Correspondence of Cicero. Vol. 5. Dublin: Hodges, Figgis & Co. OCLC 1042383632 – via Internet Archive.
- —, ed. (1897). Sophoclis Tragoediae [Sophocles's Tragedies] (in Latin). London: Macmillan & Co. OCLC 801028957.
- —, ed. (1897). The Troades of Euripides: A Revised Text, with Notes. London: Macmillan & Co. OCLC 776758061.
- —; Purser, Louis Claude, eds. (1899). The Correspondence of Cicero. Vol. 6. Dublin: Hodges, Figgis & Co. OCLC 697711387 – via Internet Archive.
- —; Purser, Louis Claude, eds. (1901). The Correspondence of Cicero. Vol. 7. Dublin: Hodges, Figgis & Co. OCLC 697711387 – via Internet Archive.
- — (1901). Anthology of Latin Poetry. London: Macmillan & Co. OCLC 1435723545 – via Internet Archive.
- —, ed. (1902). P. Terenti Afri Comoediae [The Comedies of Publius Terentius Afer]. Oxford Texts (in Latin). Oxford University Press.
- — (February 1903). "The Destruction of Sennacherib". The Classical Review (in Ancient Greek). 17 (1). Ancient Greek translation of "The Destruction of Sennacherib" by Lord Byron: 82. doi:10.1017/S0009840X00207464. ISSN 0009-840X. JSTOR 696341.
- — (October 1903). "Poem by Hartley Coleridge". The Classical Review (in Ancient Greek). 17 (7): 367. ISSN 0009-840X. JSTOR 693879.
- — (October 1903). "Review: Hayman's Passing of Arthur in Greek Heroics". The Classical Review. 17 (7): 365–367. doi:10.1017/S0009840X00208585. ISSN 0009-840X. JSTOR 693878.
- —; Sullivan, Edward, eds. (1906). Echoes from Kottabos. London: E. Grant Richards. OCLC 1042931508.
- — (1908). Introduction. The Idylls of Theocritus and the Eclogues of Virgil, Translated into English Verse. By Calverley, Charles Stuart. London: G. Bell. OCLC 4623204.
- — (1909). Essays on Greek Literature. London: Macmillan & Co. OCLC 1045391337.

== Works cited ==
- Baker, Gregory (2022). Classics and Celtic Literary Modernism: Yeats, Joyce, MacDiarmid and Jones. Cambridge University Press. doi:10.1017/9781108953825. ISBN 978-1-108-95382-5.
- Barbe, Lluis (2010). Francis Ysidro Edgeworth: A Portrait with Family and Friends. Cheltenham: Edward Elgar Publishing. ISBN 978-1-84980-322-9.
- Beard, Mary (2002). "Ciceronian Correspondences: Making a Book out of Letters". In Wiseman, Timothy Peter (ed.). Classics in Progress: Essays on Ancient Greece and Rome. Oxford University Press. pp. 103–144. ISBN 0-19-726323-2.
- Breathnach, Caoimhghin S. (2015). "Anthony Traill (1838–1914), the First Provost to Confer Degrees on Women Graduates". Ulster Medical Journal. 84 (3): 179–181. ISSN 0041-6193. PMC 4642262. PMID 26668422.
- Bristow, Joseph (2016). "The Blackmailer and the Sodomite: Oscar Wilde on Trial". Feminist Theory. 1: 41–62. doi:10.1177/1464700115620860. ISSN 1464-7001.
- Browne, Sarah (14 October 2023). "A Record of Trinity's Mind". The University Times. Archived from the original on 29 August 2024.
- Chisholm, Hugh (1922). "Tyrrell, Robert Yelverton" . In Chisholm, Hugh (ed.). Encyclopædia Britannica (12th ed.). London & New York: The Encyclopædia Britannica Company. p. 827.
- Cook, Matt (2003). London and the Culture of Homosexuality, 1885–1914. Cambridge Studies in Nineteenth-Century Literature and Culture. Cambridge University Press. ISBN 0-521-82207-6.
- Ellmann, Richard (1988). Oscar Wilde. New York: Alfred A. Knopf. ISBN 0-394-55484-1.
- Gibbs, A. M., ed. (1990). Shaw: Interviews and Recollections. London: Macmillan. ISBN 1-349-05402-X.
- Gogarty, Oliver St. John (1939). Tumbling in the Hay. London: Constable & Co. OCLC 531198.
- Harris, Frank (1916). Oscar Wilde: His Life and Confessions. New York: Brantano's. OCLC 904345488 – via Internet Archive.
- Hinkson, Henry Albert (11 March 1893). "Prof. Tyrrell at Johns Hopkins". The Critic. Vol. 22, no. 577. pp. 149–150. ISSN 2633-2655.
- Jebb, Richard Claverhouse (1871). "Tyrrell's Bacchae". The Dark Blue: 651–656.
- Jeffares, A. Norman (1982). Anglo-Irish Literature. MacMillan International Higher Education. ISBN 9781349168552.
- Lyons, J. B. (December 1984). "Oliver St. John Gogarty". Dublin Historical Review. 38 (1): 2–13. ISSN 0012-6861. JSTOR 30100748.
- Mahaffy, John Pentland (1914). "Robert Yelverton Tyrrell". Hermathenea. 18 (40). (credited as "T."): v–xvi. ISSN 0018-0750. JSTOR 23036913.
- McDowell, Robert Brendan; Webb, David Allardice (1982). Trinity College Dublin, 1592–1952: An Academic History. Cambridge University Press. ISBN 0-521-23931-1 – via Internet Archive.
- Morell, Thomas; Maltby, Edward (1815). Lexicon Graeco-prosodiacum (in Latin). Vol. 1. Cambridge: J. Smith. OCLC 1048312270 – via Google Books.
- Naiditch, P. G. (1988). A.E. Housman at University College, London: The Election of 1892. Leiden: Brill. ISBN 90-04-08848-2.
- O'Connor, Ulick (1964). Oliver St. John Gogarty: A Poet and His Times. London: Jonathan Cape. OCLC 1150982569 – via Internet Archive.
- Pašeta, Senia (1999). "Trinity College, Dublin, and the Education of Irish Catholics, 1873–1908". Studia Hibernica. 30: 7–20. doi:10.3828/sh.1999.30.1. JSTOR 20495087.
- Proudfoot, Richard; Thompson, Ann; Kastan, David Scott, eds. (2014). Shakespeare: Complete Works. The Arden Shakespeare. London: Bloomsbury. ISBN 978-1-4081-9878-0.
- Purser, Louis Claude (1916). "Robert Yelverton Tyrrell". Proceedings of the British Academy. 7: 533–539.
- Purser, Louis Claude (1927). "Tyrrell, Robert Yelverton" . In Davis, H. W. C.; Weaver, J. R. H. (eds.). Dictionary of National Biography (3rd supplement). London: Smith, Elder & Co. p. 541.
- Sampson, George (1972) [1941]. The Concise Cambridge History of English Literature. Revised by R. C. Churchill (3rd ed.). Cambridge University Press. ISBN 0-521-07385-5.
- Stanford, William Bedell (May 1941). "Classical Studies in Trinity College, Dublin, Since the Foundation". Hermathena. 57: 3–24. JSTOR 23037614.
- Stanford, William Bedell (Summer 1973). "Articles on Classical Subjects in Hermathena". Hermathena. 115: 1–12. JSTOR 23041893.
- Stanford, William Bedell (Winter 1978). "Robert Yelverton Tyrrell" (PDF). Hermathena. 125: 7–21. JSTOR 23040586. Archived from the original (PDF) on 20 October 2021.}
- Stray, Christopher (2013) [2009]. "Housman and R. C. Jebb: Intellectual Styles and the Politics of Metre". In Butterfield, David J.; Stray, Christopher A. (eds.). A. E. Housman: Classical Scholar. London: Bloomsbury. pp. 155–174. ISBN 978-1-4725-2107-1.
- Stray, Christopher, ed. (2020). Sophocles' Jebb: A Life in Letters. Cambridge Philological Society. ISBN 978-1-913701-01-7.
- Sturgeon, Sinéad; Clinton, Georgina (2009). "Tyrrell, Robert Yelverton". Dictionary of Irish Biography. doi:10.3318/dib.008703.v1.
- White, Newport J. D. (1935). Some Recollections of Trinity College, Dublin. Dublin: Hodges, Figgis, & Co. OCLC 22572277.
- Wiseman, Timothy Peter (1985). Catullus and His World: A Reappraisal. Cambridge University Press. OCLC 922579930.
- Wiseman, Timothy Peter (2022). Catullan Questions Revisited. Cambridge University Press. doi:10.1017/9781009235761. ISBN 978-1-009-23576-1.

Academic offices
| Preceded by John Kells Ingram | Regius Professor of Greek at Trinity College Dublin; 1880–1898 | Succeeded by J. B. Bury |
