= Herbert Foxwell =

English economist

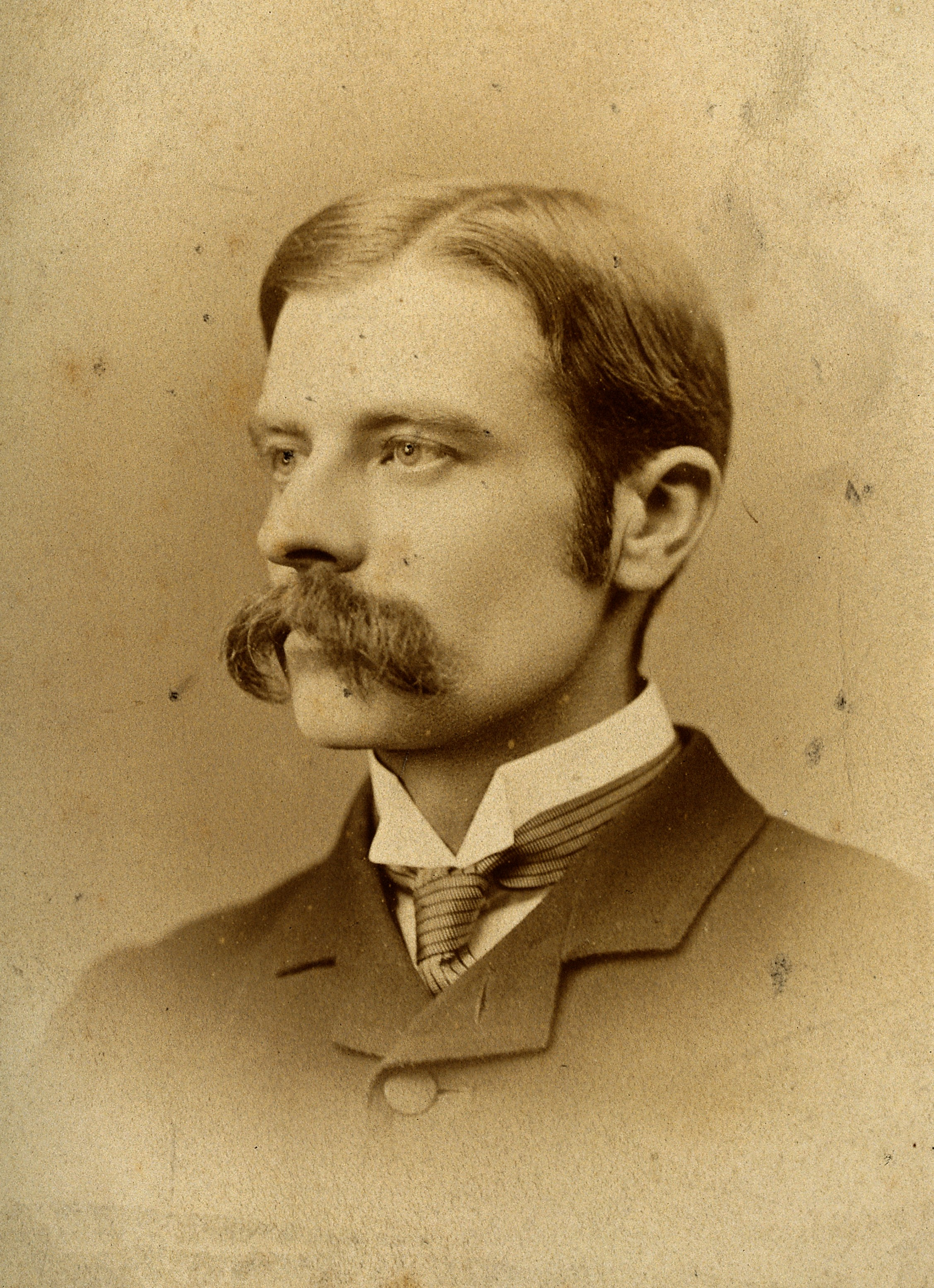
- Portrait. Credit: Wellcome Collection
- Born: Herbert Somerton Foxwell; 17 June 1849; Somerset, England
- Died: 3 August 1936 (aged 87)

Academic work
- Discipline: Political Economy
- School or tradition: English historical school

Herbert Somerton Foxwell, FBA (17 June 1849 – 3 August 1936) was an English economist.

== Biography ==
Foxwell was born in Somerset, the son of an ironmonger and slate and timber merchant. He received his early education at the Wesleyian Collegiate Institute, Taunton. After passing the London Matriculation examination at the minimum age, he obtained a London External BA Degree at the age of 18.

He went to St. John's College, Cambridge in 1868. He was placed senior in the Moral Sciences Tripos in 1870 and was associated with the college for the rest of his life. He was made a Fellow in 1874 and held his college lectureship for sixty years. In the University he was largely responsible for the honours teaching of economics from 1877 to 1908.

Foxwell was assistant lecturer to his friend Stanley Jevons who had held the Chair of Economics at University College London from 1868 and then succeeded Jevons as chair in May 1881, holding the post until 1927. At the same time, Foxwell was Newmarch Lecturer in statistics at University College London and a lecturer on currency and banking from 1896 at the London School of Economics. In 1907 he became joint Professor of Political Economy at the University of London. In addition to these appointments, Foxwell gave extramural lectures for Cambridge University from 1874 and for London from 1876 to 1881 in London, Leeds, Halifax and elsewhere. He also held the following appointments: external examiner for London, Cambridge and other universities; first Dean of the Faculty of Economics at the University of London; vice-president and president of the Council of the Royal Economic Society; member of the Councils of the Statistical Society and the British Association for the Advancement of Science; and secretary and later president of the University (Cambridge) Musical Society and the Cambridge Antiquarian Society. He also provided a course of lectures at the Institute of Actuaries.

Foxwell was a dedicated book collector and bibliophile. He concentrated on the purchase of economic books printed before 1848. He described his library as a collection of books and tracts intended to serve as the basis for the study of the industrial, commercial, monetary and financial history of the United Kingdom as well as of the gradual development of economic science generally. Foxwell's library provides the nucleus of the Goldsmiths' Library of Economic Literature. When The Worshipful Company of Goldsmiths purchased the library of economic literature from Foxwell in 1901 for £10,000 it contained about 30,000 books. The Company also generously provided Foxwell with a series of subventions following the purchase of the Library to enable him to make further acquisitions prior to the gift of the Goldsmiths' Library of Economic Literature to the University of London in 1903. From the sale in 1901, Foxwell kept back duplicates that formed a second collection which he sold to Harvard University for £4,000 in 1929. From the termination of dealings with the Goldsmiths' Company in 1903, he began creating a second major collection.

By the time of his death, Foxwell had amassed a further 20,000 volumes that were sold to Harvard University creating the focus for the Kress Library.

== Criticism of Ricardo ==
Foxwell is known for his attack on the legacy of Ricardo, who he says introduced a “wrong twist” into mainstream economics, giving "modern socialism its fancied scientific basis" through his "crude generalisation".

== Publications ==
- (1884). "Introduction" to Stanley Jevons's Investigations in Currency and Finance. London: Macmillan & Co.
- (1886). The Social Aspect of Banking.
- (1886). Irregularity of Employment and Fluctuations of Prices. Edinburgh: Co-operative Printing Company Limited.
- (1887). "The Economic Movement of England," Quarterly Journal of Economics 2 (1), pp. 84–103.
- (1895). A Criticism of Lord Farrer on the Monetary Standard. London: Effingham Wilson & Co.
- (1899). "Introduction" to Anton Menger's The Right to the Whole Produce of Labour. London: Macmillan & Co. [New York: A.M. Kelley, 1970].
- (1909). "Preface" to Andreas Michaēl Andreadēs' History of the Bank of England. London: P.S. King & Son.
- (1910). "Preface" to Willem Roosegaarde Bisschop's The Rise of the London Money Market 1640–1826. London: P.S. King and Son.
- (1914). "Preface" to George H. Pownall's English Banking. London: Blades, East & Blades.
- (1919). Papers on Current Finance. London: Macmillan & Co.
