= George Sampson (scholar) =

English literary scholar (1873 – 1950)

George Sampson (1873 – 1 February 1950) was an English literary scholar.

== Life and career ==
George Sampson was born in Greenwich to parents from Jersey. Although he left school comparatively early, he was trained as a teacher at Southwark and Winchester and was a head master for many years. In 1907 he married Grace Alldis. From 1917 to 1919 he served on the executive committee of the English Association, and from 1920 to 1923, as its Honorary General Secretary. In 1921, he received an honorary M.A. from the University of Cambridge. In 1925, he was appointed inspector of schools under the London County Council.

After his retirement he lived at Hove until his death from heart failure.

== Publications ==
Sampson's best-known works include: English for the English (1921), The Concise Cambridge History of English Literature (1941, a single-volume abridgement of The Cambridge History of English Literature), and Seven Essays (1947). He also produced editions of George Berkeley, Edmund Burke, John Henry Cardinal Newman, Thomas More, George Herbert, John Keats, Walter Bagehot, Samuel Taylor Coleridge, and William Hazlitt.
