= Come Down, O Love Divine =

Christian hymn

- Christian hymn
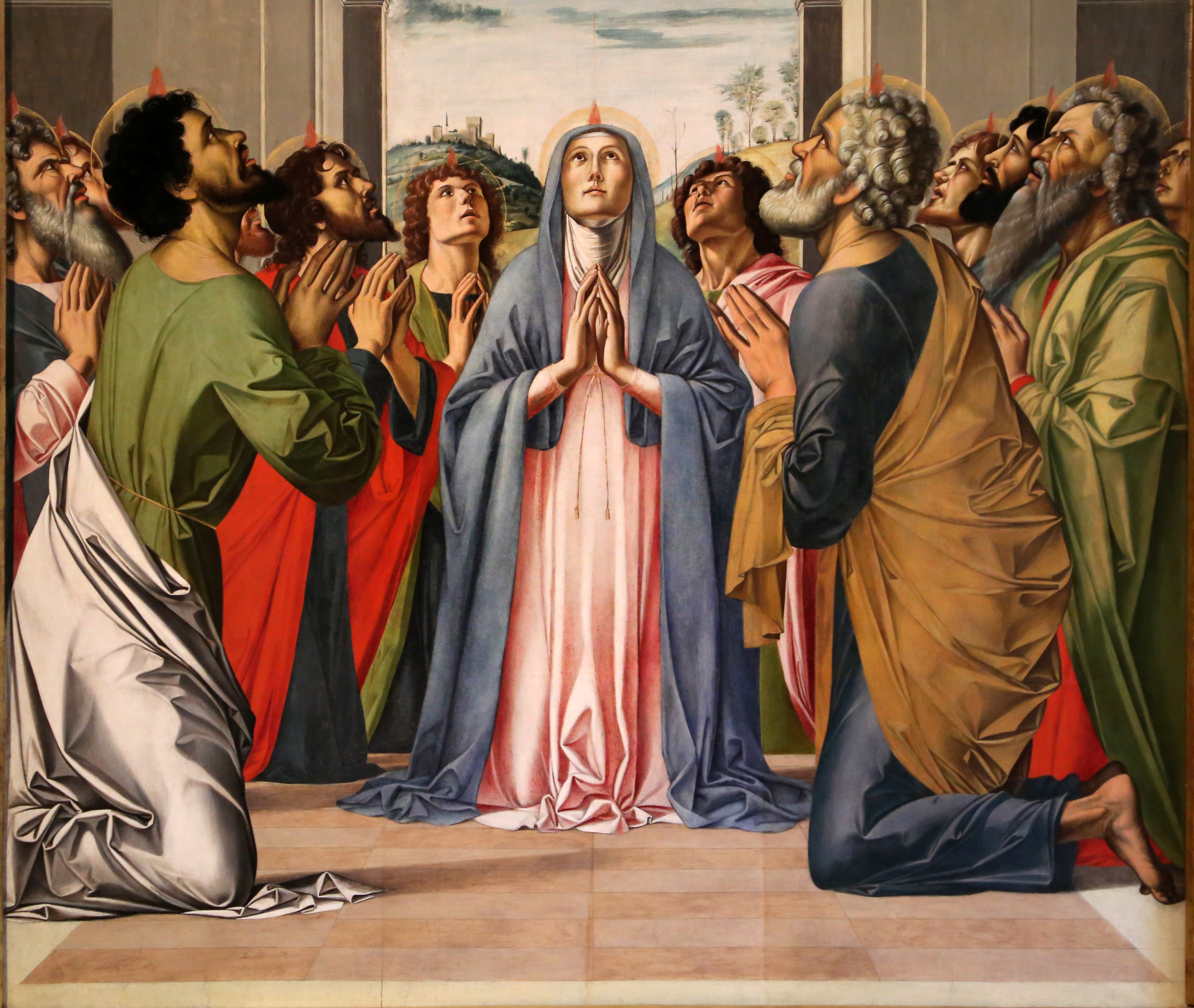
- 15th-century Pentecost altarpiece by Alvise Vivarini depicting tongues of fire descending on the Apostles
- Occasion: Pentecost
- Written: c. 1390
- Text: translation by Richard Frederick Littledale
- Based on: "Discendi amor santo" by Bianco da Siena
- Meter: 6.6.11 D
- Melody: Down Ampney by Ralph Vaughan Williams
- Composed: 1906
- Published: 1867

"Come Down, O Love Divine" is a Christian hymn usually sung for the festival of Pentecost. It makes reference to the descent of the Holy Spirit as an invocation to God to come to into the soul of the believer. It is a popular piece of Anglican church music and is commonly sung to the tune "Down Ampney" by Ralph Vaughan Williams or the less well-known tune North Petherton by William Henry Harris.

== History ==
The text of "Come down, O Love divine" originated as an Italian poem, "Discendi amor santo" by the medieval mystic poet Bianco da Siena (1350-1399). The poem appeared in the 1851 collection Laudi Spirituali del Bianco da Siena of Telesforo Bini, and in 1861, the Anglo-Irish clergyman and writer Richard Frederick Littledale translated it into English. The first publication of the English version was in Littledale's 1867 hymn-book, The People's Hymnal.

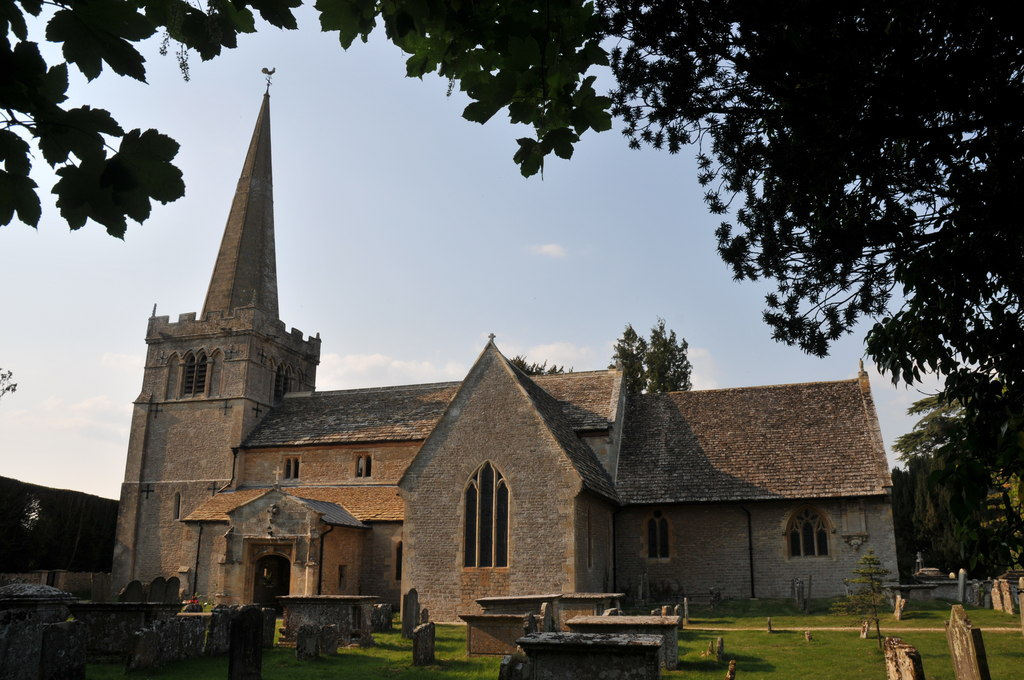
The village of Down Ampney, Gloucestershire, England, after which the hymn tune was named

For the hymn's publication in The English Hymnal of 1906, the hymnal's editor Ralph Vaughan Williams composed a tune, "Down Ampney", which he named after the Gloucestershire village of his birth. This publication established the hymn's widespread popularity. When Vaughan Williams died in 1958, "Come Down, O Love Divine" was sung at his funeral in Westminster Abbey as the composer's ashes were ceremonially interred in the Musicians' Corner.

== Text ==
Come down, O Love divine,
Seek Thou this soul of mine,
And visit it with Thine own ardour glowing;
O Comforter, draw near,
Within my heart appear,
and kindle it, Thy holy flame bestowing.

O let it freely burn
Till earthly passions turn
To dust and ashes in its heat consuming:
And let Thy glorious light
Shine ever on my sight,
And clothe me round, the while my path illuming.

Let holy charity
Mine outward vesture be,
And lowliness become my inner clothing,
True lowliness of heart,
Which takes the humbler part,
And o'er its own shortcomings weeps with loathing.

And so the yearning strong,
With which the soul will long,
Shall far outpass the power of human telling;
For none can guess its grace,
Till he become the place
Wherein the Holy Spirit makes His dwelling.

== Tune ==
The following setting of the tune appears in The English Hymnal (1906):

== See also ==
- Veni Creator Spiritus
