= John Ward (diplomat, died 1890) =

English diplomat

John Ward (1805–1890) was an English diplomat.

== Early life ==
He was born on 28 August 1805 at East Cowes, where his father, John Ward, was collector of customs. His mother Martha was a sister of Thomas Arnold of Rugby. As a young man he associated with Arnold, Richard Whately and other liberals.

In 1831 Ward edited with Arnold the short-lived weekly The Englishman's Register, of which Arnold was the proprietor. He gave up the law, for which he had been trained, on his appointment in 1837 to an inspectorship of prisons. The following year, after some months as private secretary to John Lambton, 1st Earl of Durham, became through his influence secretary to the New Zealand Colonization Company.

== Diplomat ==
Early in 1841 Ward was appointed British commissioner for the revision of the State tolls. In 1844 he was sent to Berlin as British commissioner for the settlement, through the arbitration of Frederick William IV of Prussia, of the so-called Portendic claims on France, arising out of a blockade by French ships of part of the African coast.

In summer 1845 Lord Aberdeen appointed Ward consul-general at Leipzig, with a commission to visit places in Germany where conferences of the Zollverein would be held. At the end of 1850 Lord Palmerston instructed him to act as secretary of legation at Dresden during the diplomatic conferences held in there, and he saw the results achieved by the policy of Austria, represented by Prince Felix of Schwarzenberg. In 1854 he attended the Munich exhibition of arts and manufactures, and wrote a report on the state of technical instruction in Bavaria. In 1857 he was charged with a political inquiry into Schleswig-Holstein; but his report was left unpublished by Lord Clarendon.

In 1860 Ward, after being made a C.B., was nominated chargé d'affaires and consul-general for the Hanse Towns and the surrounding parts of Germany. Negotiating in 1865, with Lord Napier and Ettrick, a commercial treaty with the Zollverein, he was in 1866 raised to the rank of minister-resident.

== Later life ==
In 1870, after the abolition of direct diplomatic relations with the Hanse Towns when they joined the North German Confederation, Ward left Hamburg. The rest of his life he spent in retirement, at Dover and in Essex, writing his Reminiscences.

Ward died at Dover on 1 September 1890.

== Works ==
Ward published in 1839 an account of the resources of New Zealand, for New Zealand Colonization Company. He wrote articles on both home and foreign affairs in the Edinburgh Review and British and Foreign Review. Experiences of a Diplomatist (1872) was based on three decades of diaries from his time in Germany.

== Family ==
Ward married Caroline, daughter of John Bullock, rector of Radwinter, Essex, who survived him until 1905. Their second son was Adolphus William Ward.

== Notes ==
Attribution

This article incorporates text from a publication now in the public domain: Lee, Sidney, ed. (1899). "Ward, John (1805-1890)". Dictionary of National Biography. Vol. 59. London: Smith, Elder & Co.
