= Richard Frederick Littledale =

Anglo-Irish cleric and writer (1833–1890)

Richard Frederick Littledale (14 September 1833 – 11 January 1890) was an Anglo-Irish clergyman and writer.

== Life ==
The fourth son of John Littledale, an auctioneer, he was born in Dublin on 14 September 1833. On 15 October 1850 he entered Trinity College Dublin, was elected a Scholar in 1852, graduated B.A. as a first class in classics, and in 1855 obtained the senior Berkeley gold medal and the first divinity prize. He proceeded at Dublin M.A. in 1858, and LL.B. and LL.D. in 1862, and at Oxford on 5 July 1862 D.C.L. comitatis causa.

He was curate of St. Matthew in Thorpe Hamlet, Norfolk, from 1856 to 1857. From 1857 to 1861 he was curate of St Mary the Virgin, Crown Street, Soho, London, where he took an interest in the House of Charity.

Throughout the remainder of his life he suffered from chronic ill-health, took little part in any parochial duties, and devoted himself mainly to writing. Until his death he continued to act as a father confessor, and next to Edward Pusey is said to have heard more confessions than any other priest of the church of England. Through William Bell Scott he came to know and influence Christina Rossetti.

He died at 9 Red Lion Square, London, on 11 January 1890. A reredos to his memory was erected in the chapel at St. Katharine's, 32 Queen Square, London, in March 1891.

== Works ==
Littledale was a contributor to periodicals: Kottabos (a college miscellany, published at Trinity in Dublin), Notes and Queries, the Daily Telegraph, the Church Quarterly Review, and The Academy. He was the author of books and pamphlets in support of Anglicanism, in opposition to Roman Catholicism.

In conjunction with the Rev. James Edward Vaux, Littledale wrote: The Priest's Prayer Book, 1864 (seven editions), The People's Hymnal, 1867 (eight editions), The Christian Passover, 1873 (four editions), and The Altar Manual, of which forty-six thousand copies were circulated. The People's Hymnal contained the hymn Come Down, O Love Divine, for which the words were translated by Littledale from the Italian of Bianco da Siena. The original poem was included in the Laudi Spirituali del Bianco da Siena of Telesforo Bini, of 1851.

He completed after the death in 1866 of the author, John Mason Neale, who was a close friend, Neale's Commentary on the Psalms from Primitive and Mediæval Writers, vols. ii. iii. and iv., 1868–74, and later edited two other editions of the entire work. He was also joint author with Neale of Liturgy of SS. Mark, James, Clement, Chrysostom, Basil, 1868–9.

Littledale's Plain Reasons for not joining the Church of Rome, a volume of which thirty-six thousand copies were issued in 1880 and following years, evoked replies from the Rev. W. Horsfall, the Rev. A. Mills, Oxoniensis, and H. I. D. Ryder. In 1874 Littledale edited a work entitled The Church of England in presence of Official Anglicanism, Evangelicanism, Rationalism, and the Church of Rome. By Gervase.

Littledale wrote the articles "Jesuits" and "St. Francis Xavier" for the Ninth and Tenth Editions (1875–89; 1902–03) of the Encyclopaedia Britannica.

Other works were:

- ‘On the Application of Colour to the Decoration of Churches,’ 1857.
- ‘Religious Communities of Women in the early Church,’ 1862.
- ‘Carols for Christmas and other Seasons,’ 1863.
- ‘The North Side of the Altar,’ 1864; 3rd edit. 1865.
- ‘Catholic Ritual in the Church of England, Scriptural, Reasonable, Lawful,’ 1865, thirteen editions.
- ‘The Elevation of the Host,’ 1865, two editions.
- ‘Incense: a Liturgical Essay,’ 1866.
- ‘The Mixed Chalice,’ 1867, four editions.
- ‘The Christian Priesthood,’ 1867.
- ‘Prayers for the Dead,’ 1867.
- ‘Catholic Revision of the Book of Common Prayer: a Letter to the Archbishop of Canterbury,’ 1867.
- ‘Early Christian Ritual,’ 1867, four editions.
- ‘What is Ritualism? And why ought it to be supported?’ 1867.
- ‘A commentary on the Psalms’, John Mason Neale and Richard Frederick Littledale (1868)
- ‘The Children's Bread, or Communion Office for the Young,’ 1868, four editions.
- ‘Additional Services: a second Letter to the Archbishop of Canterbury,’ 1868.
- ‘A Commentary on the Song of Songs,’ 1869.
- ‘Church Reform,’ 1870.
- ‘The Crisis of Disestablishment,’ 1870.
- ‘Pharisaic Proselytism, a forgotten Chapter of early Church History,’ 1870.
- ‘Tradition,’ 1870.
- ‘The Two Religions,’ 1870.
- ‘Misapplied Texts of Scripture: a Lecture,’ 1870.
- ‘Church and Dissent,’ 1871.
- ‘Secular Studies of the Clergy,’ 1871.
- ‘Rationale of Prayer,’ 1872. Answered by John Tyndall and others.
- ‘At the Old Catholic Congress,’ 1872.
- ‘Children at Calvary,’ 1872.
- ‘The Religious Education of Women,’ 1873; new edition, 1874.
- ‘The Relation of the Clergy to Politics,’ 1873.
- ‘Church Parties,’ 1874.
- ‘Papers on Sisterhoods,’ 1874–8.
- ‘Dean Stanley on Ecclesiastical Vestments,’ 1875, three editions.
- ‘Last Attempt to Reform the Church of Rome from within,’ 1875.
- ‘Apostolical Succession,’ 1876.
- ‘Ritualistic Practices (1), what they are; (2) what they mean,’ 1876.
- ‘Ritualists and Romanists,’ 1876.
- ‘Ultramontane Popular Literature,’ 1876.
- ‘An Inner View of the Vatican Council,’ 1877.
- ‘Christianity and Patriotism,’ 1877.
- ‘The Pantheistic Factor in Christian Thought,’ 1877.
- ‘Why Ritualists do not become Roman Catholics,’ 1878. Replied to by the Rev. Orby Shipley, 1879.
- ‘Future Probation,’ 1886.
- ‘A Short History of the Council of Trent,’ 1888.
- ‘Words for Truth; Replies to Roman Cavils against the Church of England,’ 1888.
- ‘The Petrine Claims: a Critical Inquiry,’ 1889.
- Controversy on the Constitutions of the Jesuits (Winnipeg, 1889). Involved Lewis Henry Drummond.
