= Bianco da Siena =

Italian poet (died 1399)

Bianco di Santi alias Bianco da Siena or Bianco da Lanciolina (Anciolina, 1350 circa - Venice, 1399) was an Italian mystic poet and an imitator of Jacopone da Todi. He wrote several religiously-inspired poems (lauda) that were popular in the Middle Ages. First a wool carder, he eventually became a member of the poor Jesuates, founded by Giovanni Colombini.

== Biography ==
According to Feo Belcari, Bianco da Siena was native of Lanciolina di Valdarno (at present Anciolina, in the province of Arezzo), but he worked as a wool carder at Siena.

His date of birth is uncertain, but probably took place around 1350, since Belcari defines him as very young in 1367, when he entered the Jesuates. This company was founded towards 1360 by Colombini and his friend Francesco Vincenti: they proposed a life of poverty and penitence. In May 1367, Bianco da Siena entered the company and left Siena with them to ask the approval of Pope Urban V. The Jesuates were received with benevolence at Viterbo, where the pontiff stayed with the project to bring the Holy See to Rome. In the meantime, they were suspected of heresy: Colombini assuaged these suspicions, however, several members left the company. During the return to Siena, Colombini fell ill and died at Acquapendente 31 July 1367.

Because of the intervention of the Roman Curia, the Jesuates became a religious order: the members had to give up their roaming life and settled in Tuscany and in Umbria. Bianco da Siena stayed some time in Siena, then went to Città di Castello, which he left before 1383. Afterwards, he travelled with a colleague in Umbria and in Tuscany and he stopped in Pistoia. He settled in Venice, where he died in 1399.

== Poetry ==
Bianco da Siena wrote several religiously-inspired poems. These were widely read in the Middle Ages and they are in many manuscripts. One hundred and twenty-two poems were published, spanning more than twenty thousand lines of verse.

In the 20th century, an English translation of his poem "Discendi amor santo" by Richard Frederick Littledale became a popular Christian hymn, "Come Down, O Love Divine", after it was set to music by the British composer Ralph Vaughan Williams in 1906.

== Posterity ==
Richard Frederick Littledale translated multiple poems into English that have come into common use in the Church.

- Discendi amor santo - Come down, O Love Divine
- Gesù Christo amoroso - O Jesus Christ, the loving
- Vergine Santa, Sposa dell'Agnello - O Virgin spouse of Christ, the Lamb
- Ama Jesu, el tuo sposo diletto - Love Jesu, who hath sought thee so:

== Bibliography ==
- Il Bianco da Siena, Laudi, critical edition by Silvia Serventi. Rome, Antonianum, 2013.
- Telesforo Bini, Laudi spirituali del Bianco da Siena, povero gesuato del secolo XIV, Lucca, G. Giusti, 1851 (Edition of poems I-XCII).
- Franca Ageno, Il Bianco da Siena. Notizie e testi inediti, Genova-Roma-Napoli, Società Anonima Editrice Dante Alighieri, 1939 (Edition of poems XCIII-CXI).
- Bianco da Siena, Serventesi inediti, edited by Emanuele Arioli, Pisa, ETS, 2012 (Edition of poems CXII-CXXII).
- Giorgio Petrocchi, La letteratura religiosa, in Storia della letteratura italiana, dir. Emilio Cecchi, Natalino Sapegno, II, Il Trecento, Milano, Garzanti, 1965, p. 511-545.
- Guido Baldassarri, Letteratura devota, edificante e morale, in Storia della letteratura italiana, diretta da Enrico Malato, II, Il Trecento, Roma, Salerno, 1995, p. 211-326.
- Christopher Kleinhenz, Medieval Italy: an encyclopedia, London, Routledge, 2004, t. I, p. 119-120.
- Costanzo Cargnoni, Antonio Gentili, Mauro Regazzoni, Pietro Zovatto, Storia della spiritualità italiana, Roma, Città Nuova Editrice, 2002.
- Ottavio Gigli, Prose di Feo Belcari edite ed inedite, Roma, Salviucci, 1843, I, p. 105-107, II, p. 23-32.
- Feo Belcari, Vita del beato Giovanni Colombini da Siena, fondatore de' poveri Gesuati con parte della vita d'alcuni primi suoi compagni, edited by Antonio Cesari, Verona, Tipografia erede Merlo, 1817.
- Vittoria Deudi, I Gesuati e il loro poeta Bianco da Siena, in Bullettino senese di storia patria, 1911, XVIII, p. 396-412.
- Francesco Zambrini, Le opere volgari a stampa dei secoli XIII e XIV ed altre a' medesimi riferibili o falsamente assegnate, Bologna, G. Romagnoli, 1861, p. 31
- Isabella Gagliardi, Li trofei della croce: l'esperienza gesuata e la società lucchese tra Medioevo ed età moderna, Roma, Ed. di Storia e Letteratura, 2005.
- Pietro Zovatto, Storia della spiritualità italiana, Roma, Città Nuova, 2002.
- Georg Dufner, Geschichte der Jesuaten, Roma, Ed. di storia e letteratura, 1975.
- Josiah Miller, Singers and songs of the Church, sketches of the hymn-writers, London, Longmans, Green, and Co, 1869, p. 37
- John Julian, A dictionary of Hymnology, New York, Dover Publication, 1957, p. 141.
- Erik Routley, An English Speaking Hymnal Guide, Chicago, GIA Publications, 2005, p. 37.
- Martin Manser, The Wordsworth Book of Hymns, Hertfordshire, Wordsworth Editions, 2006, p. 95-96
- LindaJo H. McKim, The Presbyterian Hymnal Companion, Louisville (Kentucky), Westminster/John Knox Press, 1993, p. 223.
- Gordon Kerry, New Classical Music: Composing Australia, Sydney, University of New South Wales, 2009, p. 110.
- Jeffery B. Loomis, Dayspring in darkness: sacrament in Hopkins, Crambury, London, Mississauga, Associated University Presses, 1988, p. 206.
