= John William Stubbs =

Irish mathematician and clergyman

John William Stubbs (1 Feb 1821–10 Oct 1897) was an Irish mathematician and clergyman who served as bursar of Trinity College Dublin (TCD). He has been co-credited with introducing the geometric concept of inversion in a circle, and late in life he authored a book on the history of the University of Dublin.

== Biography ==
Stubbs was born in Finglas, a suburb of Dublin, and graduated from TCD in 1840 as first senior moderator in mathematics, with a gold medal.

He published in mathematics over the next few years, and has been co-credited (along with John Kells Ingram) with introducing the geometric concept of inversion in a circle, in a joint paper. We now know that Jacob Steiner (in 1824) and Giusto Bellavitis (in 1836) had stumbled on similar constructions earlier, as had Joseph Liouville and, a little later, Lord Kelvin.

This Ingram & Stubbs innovation was highlighted in John Casey's work, A Sequel to the First Six Books of Euclid containing An Easy Introduction to Modern Geometry, with Numerous Examples (4th edition, 1886), and also in the Proceedings of the Royal Irish Academy in 1845.

In 1845 Stubbs got his MA, was made a Fellow of TCD, and was admitted to holy orders, henceforth shifting his focus to church matters. His doctor of divinity was awarded in 1866, and in 1882 he was made Senior Fellow and Bursar of TCD. He also served as the treasurer of St Patrick's Cathedral in Dublin. He had married Catherine Louisa Cotter in 1855, and the couple subsequently had five children.

In 1889, he published the book, The History of the University of Dublin, from Its Foundation to the End of the Eighteenth Century.
