= Alfred Rayney Waller =

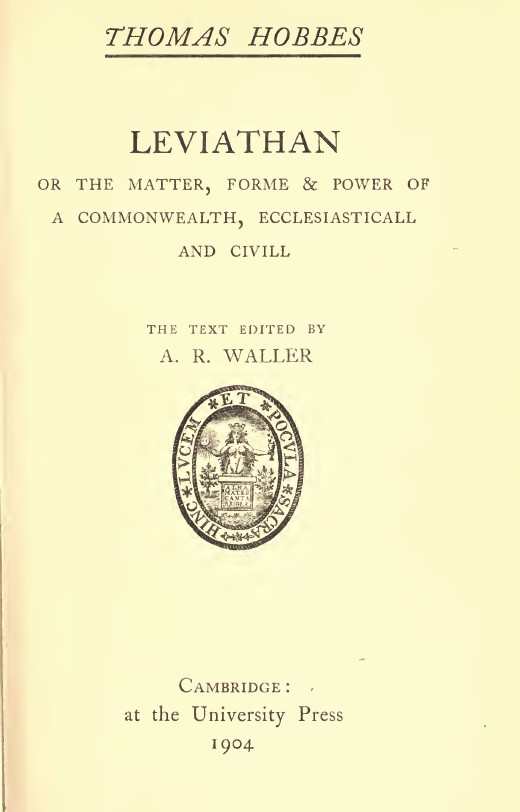
1904 edition of Leviathan by Thomas Hobbes edited by A. R. Waller

Alfred Rayney Waller (1867, York – 1922) was an English journalist and man of letters, known as the co-editor-in-chief with A. W. Ward of The Cambridge History of English Literature.

A. R. Waller received an M.A. from Peterhouse, Cambridge. He worked from 1888 to 1902 as a journalist and literary editor in London. He was for a number of years Secretary to the Syndics of Cambridge University Press. He edited John Florio's Montaigne, 6 volumes, 1897. With Arnold Glover he edited the collected works of William Hazlitt, 13 volumes, 1902–1906. Waller translated Molière's plays, 8 volumes, 1902–1907. He also edited the works of Samuel Butler, Abraham Cowley, Richard Crashaw, and Matthew Prior, 1904–1905. Waller and A. W. Ward were the joint editors-in-chief of The Cambridge History of English Literature, 14 vols., 1907–1921.

Waller married in 1890 and his wife contributed to volumes one, seven, and eight of the translations of Molière's plays.
