= Adolphus Ward =

English historian (1837–1924)

Sir Adolphus Ward FRHistS FBA
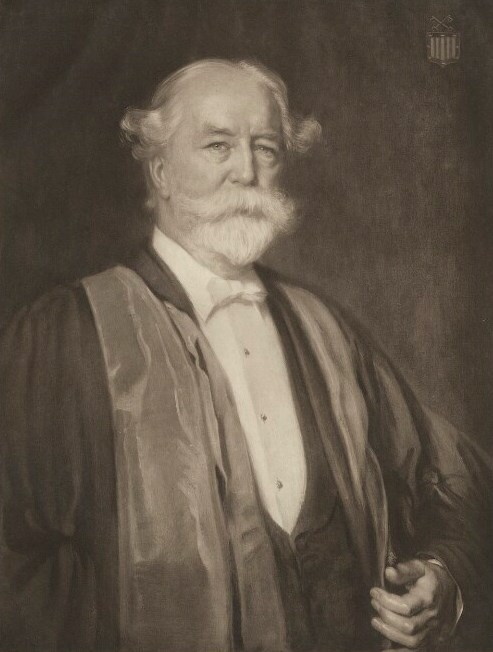
- Born: 2 December 1837; Hampstead, London, England
- Died: 19 June 1924 (aged 86)

Academic background
- Education: Peterhouse, Cambridge

Academic work
- Discipline: History; English literature
- Sub-discipline: Medieval history
- Institutions: Owens College, Manchester; Peterhouse, Cambridge

Sir Adolphus William Ward FRHistS FBA (2 December 1837 – 19 June 1924) was an English historian and man of letters.

== Life ==
Ward was born at Hampstead, London, the son of John Ward. He was educated in Germany and at Peterhouse, Cambridge.

In 1866, Ward was appointed professor of history and English literature in Owens College, Manchester, and was principal from 1890 to 1897, when he retired.

He took an active part in the foundation of Victoria University, of which he was vice-chancellor from 1886 to 1890 and from 1894 to 1896,

He was elected to membership of the Manchester Literary and Philosophical Society on 5 March 1895. He was a founder of Withington Girls' School in 1890. He was a Member of the Chetham Society, serving as a member of council from 1884 and as president from 1901 until 1915.

In 1897, the freedom of the city of Manchester was conferred upon him, he delivered the Ford Lectures at the University of Oxford in 1898, and on 29 October 1900 he was elected master of Peterhouse, Cambridge.

He was elected in 1903 a fellow of the British Academy and was the academy's president from 1911 to 1913. In 1919 he delivered the British Academy's Shakespeare Lecture.

Ward served as president of the Royal Historical Society from 1899 to 1901, and he was knighted in 1913.

== Works ==
Ward's major work is his standard History of English Dramatic Literature to the Age of Queen Anne (1875), re-edited after a thorough revision in three volumes in 1899. He also wrote The House of Austria in the Thirty Years' War (1869), Great Britain and Hanover: Some Aspects of the Personal Union (1899), and The Electress Sophia and the Hanoverian Succession (1903) (2nd ed. 1909). His Germany, 1815–1890 has three volumes.

Ward edited George Crabbe's Poems (2 vols., 1905–1906) and Alexander Pope's Poetical Works (1869); he wrote the volumes on Geoffrey Chaucer and Charles Dickens in the "English Men of Letters" series, translated Ernst Curtius's History of Greece (5 vols., 1868–1873); with G. W. Prothero and Stanley Mordaunt Leathes he edited the Cambridge Modern History between 1901 and 1912, and with A. R. Waller edited the Cambridge History of English Literature (1907, etc.).

Ward's collected papers were published in 5 volumes by Cambridge University Press in 1921.

== Notes ==
Academic offices
Preceded by Joseph Gouge Greenwood	Vice-Chancellor, Victoria University (UK); 1887–1891	Succeeded by Gerald Henry Rendall
Preceded by Gerald Henry Rendall	Vice-Chancellor, Victoria University (UK); 1895–1897	Succeeded by Nathan Bodington
Preceded by James Porter	Master of Peterhouse, Cambridge; 1900–1924	Succeeded by Robert Chalmers
Preceded by William Chawner	Vice-Chancellor of the University of Cambridge; 1901–1902	Succeeded by Frederic Chase
Professional and academic associations
Preceded by Sir Mountstuart Grant Duff	President of the Royal Historical Society; 1899–1901	Succeeded by George Walter Prothero
Preceded by Richard Copley Christie	President of the Chetham Society; 1901–15	Succeeded by James Tait
