= Hermathena (journal) =

Irish classical journal

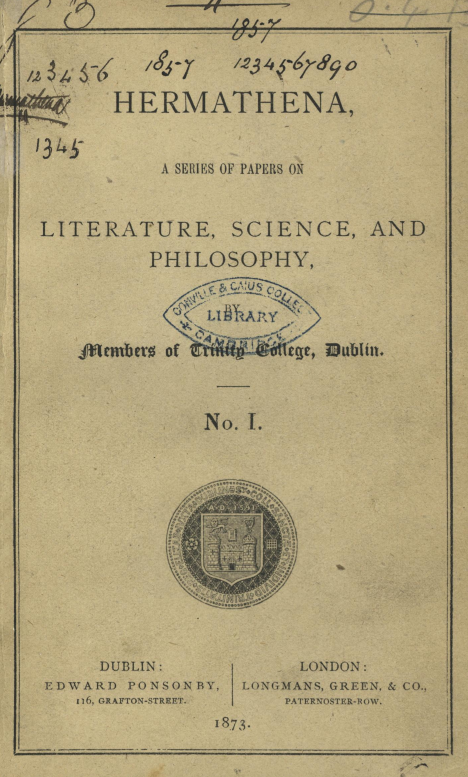
- Cover page of first issue
- Editor: Monica Gale
- Categories: History journal
- Frequency: Biannual
- Publisher: Trinity College Dublin
- First issue: 1873; 152 years ago
- Language: English
- Website: https://www.tcd.ie/classics/hermathena/
- ISSN: 0018-0750
- OCLC: 880684138

Hermathena is a biannual peer-reviewed academic journal of the classical world published by Trinity College Dublin, under the auspices of the Department of Classics in the School of Histories and Humanities. It was established in 1873 and is now one of the longest-running classical journals in the world.

The founder of the journal was Robert Yelverton Tyrrell (1844-1914). He was the first editor-in-chief.

Since 2012 the editor-in-chief is professor Monica Gale.
