= George Ferdinand Shaw =

Irish economist

George Ferdinand Shaw (1821 – 19 June 1899) was an Irish academic and journalist who is best remembered as the first editor of The Irish Times.

== Life ==
Shaw was born in Dublin in 1821, to William and Elizabeth Shaw, and baptized in St. Mary's Church, Dublin (Church of Ireland). He graduated from Trinity College Dublin (TCD) as Senior Moderator in Mathematics in 1844. He was elected a Fellow in 1848, and in 1890 became a Senior Fellow.

Early in his career, he obtained permission to accept the appointment as the first Professor of Natural Philosophy at Queen's College, Cork, in 1849, holding that post until 1854. But the bulk of his life was spent at TCD, where he served as Senior Dean and Registrar.

In 1859, he became the first editor of The Irish Times, though he only served in the role for a few months. He remained active in journalism, writing for The Nation 1862–1866, Saunders' News Letter and the Dublin Evening Mail.
