= English historical school of economics =

Approach to economics

The English historical school of economics sought a return of inductive methods in economics, following the triumph of the deductive approach of David Ricardo in the early 19th century. The school considered itself the intellectual heirs of past figures who had emphasised empiricism and induction, such as Francis Bacon and Adam Smith. Included in this school are William Whewell, Richard Jones, Thomas Edward Cliffe Leslie, Walter Bagehot, Thorold Rogers, Arnold Toynbee, William Cunningham, and William Ashley.

== Concepts ==
The economists of the English historical school were in general agreement on several ideas. They pursued an inductive approach to economics rather than the deductive approach taken by classical and neoclassical theorists. They recognised the need for careful statistical research. They rejected the hypothesis of "the profit maximizing individual" or the "calculus of pleasure and pain" as the only basis for economic analysis and policy. They believed that it was more reasonable to base analysis on the collective whole of altruistic individuals. Historical economists of the nineteenth century also rejected the view that economic policy prescriptions, however derived, would apply universally, without regard to place or time, as followers of the Ricardian and Marshallian schools did.

Alfred Marshall acknowledged the force of the historical school's views in his 1890 synthesis:

[T]he explanation of the past and the prediction of the future are not different operations, but the same worked in opposite directions, the one from effect to cause, the other from cause to effect. As Schmoller well says, to obtain "a knowledge of individual causes" we need "induction; the final conclusion of which is indeed nothing but the inversion of the Syllogism which is employed in deduction.... Induction and deduction rest on the same tendencies, the same beliefs, the same needs of our reason."

—

== Influences ==
John Stuart Mill, Auguste Comte, and Herbert Spencer appear among the influences on the English historical economists. The second half of Queen Victoria's reign saw the triumph of evolutionary concepts in the sciences (geology, biology, and sociology) and a transition from a "coal and iron" based manufacturing economy to one based on communication, urbanisation, finance, and empire. The rise of the historical school of jurisprudence provided "allies in the struggle against the dominance of the abstract theory." Historical economists viewed classical and neoclassical economics as too formal and as a rationalisation of free-trade policies in a colonial and imperial setting.

== See also ==
- Historical school of economics
