= The Cambridge History of English and American Literature =

- Seal of the encyclopedia
- Language: English
- Subject: Literature
- Genre: Literary criticism
- Published: Cambridge University Press; Bartleby.com
- Publication date: 1907–1921 (print); 2000 (online)
- Pages: 11,013
- ISBN: 1-58734-073-9

The Cambridge History of English and American Literature is an encyclopedia of literary criticism that was published by Cambridge University Press between 1907 and 1921.

== Contributions and publications ==
Edited and written by an international panel of 171 leading scholars and thinkers of the early 20th century, its 18 volumes comprise 303 chapters and more than 11,000 pages. The English literature chapters begin with Old English poetry and end with the late Victorian era. Coverage of American literature ranges from colonial and revolutionary periods through the early 20th century.

A. W. Ward and A. R. Waller were editors-in-chief of the 14 volumes and an additional index volume on English literature. William Peterfield Trent, John Erskine, Stuart Sherman and Carl Van Doren were the editors-in-chief of the four volumes on American literature. The four volumes on American literature were published in Cambridge, England by Cambridge University Press and by G. P. Putnam's Sons in New York City.

== Online publication, reception and range ==
Bartleby.com published the complete work online in the year 2000, dividing it into over 5,600 files, and including indexes by chapter, bibliography, and chapter author. It contains biographical information and bibliographies on major individuals and literary movements. It is "considered the most important work of literary history and criticism ever published", its "topics ranging from poetry, fiction, drama and essays to history, theology and political writing." The encyclopedia's scope is vast, encompassing "a wide selection of writing on orators, humorists, poets, newspaper columnists, religious leaders, economists, Native Americans, songwriters, and even non-English writing, such as Yiddish and Creole".

== Sections ==
Volume	Title	Collection
I.	From the Beginnings to the Cycles of Romance.	English
II.	The End of the Middle Ages.	English
III.	Renascence and Reformation.	English
IV.	Prose and Poetry from Sir Thomas North to Michael Drayton.	English
V.	The Drama to 1642: Part I.	English
VI.	The Drama to 1642: Part II.	English
VII.	Cavalier and Puritan.	English
VIII.	The Age of Dryden.	English
IX.	From Steele and Addison to Pope and Swift.	English
X.	The Age of Johnson.	English
XI.	The Period of the French Revolution.	English
XII.	The Romantic Revival.	English
XIII.	The Victorian Age: Part I.	English
XIV.	The Victorian Age: Part II.	English
XV.	Colonial and Revolutionary Literature.	American
	Early National Literature: Part I.	American
XVI.	Early National Literature: Part II.	American
	Later National Literature: Part I.	American
XVII.	Later National Literature: Part II.	American
XVIII.	Later National Literature: Part III.	American

== See also ==
- The Cambridge History of the Book in Britain
- The Cambridge History of the English Language
