= List of large-group awareness training organizations =

The methods, courses and/or techniques of the organizations listed here have been identified with Large-group awareness training by reliable sources.

== A ==
- Actualizations (Stewart Emery)
- Alpha Seminars
- Altru Center
- Arica School (Oscar Ichazo)
- Atlas Project
- Avatar Course (Harry Palmer)
- AsiaWorks
- Ascension Leadership Academy

== C ==
- Call of the Shofar (founded by Simcha Frischling)
- Context International (previously Context Associated, founded by Randy Revell, who had worked with Mind Dynamics)
- Contextuelles Coaching (Maria & Stephan Craemer)
- Choices Personal Growth Seminar
- Choice Center |url= https://choicecenter.com/|

== D ==
- Dimensional Mind Approach
- Direct Centering (Gavin Barnes, a.k.a. Bayard Hora Associates, a.k.a. The Course, a.k.a. Naexus)

== E ==
- Educo Seminar
- Erhard Seminars Training (est) (Werner Erhard)
- Exegesis
- e360 Training

== F ==
- The Forum (Werner Erhard)

== G ==
- Gratitude Training
- Giving Tree Global

== H ==
- Heartcore Leadership

== I ==
- Impact Training (Hans & Sally Berger)
- Insight Seminars (John-Roger Hinkins) (Russell Bishop)
- Inner Matrix Systems (Joey Klein)
- Isha Foundation (Sadhguru)

== K ==
- Klemmer and Associates (Brian Klemmer)

== L ==
- Landmark Worldwide (formerly Landmark Education)
- Leadership Dynamics (William Penn Patrick)
- Life Dynamics
- Lifespring (John Hanley)
- Lifestream Seminars (James Roswell Quinn)
- Life Training / Kairos Foundation / More to Life (W. R. Whitten and K. B. Brown)
- Life Design Education (Daniel Paraszkay)

== M ==
- Mind Dynamics (Alexander Everett)

== N ==
- NXIVM (Keith Raniere)

== O ==
- ONE (Oury Engolz)
- The Option Institute

== P ==
- PSI Seminars

== R ==
- Relationships
- Rapport Leadership

== S ==
- Silva Method (formerly Silva Mind Control) (José Silva)
- Sterling Institute of Relationship (Arthur Kasarjian)
- Spring Ridge Academy
- Source Point Training
- Siddha Samadhi Yoga (Rishi Prabhakar)

== T ==
- Transformation Technologies (Werner Erhard)
- Tony Robbins
- Training In Power Academy

== W ==
- Werner Erhard and Associates (Werner Erhard)
