= Alexander Everett =

British self-improvement and personal development consultant

- Born: 1921; England, UK
- Died: January 16, 2005; Oregon, USA
- Occupation: Author
- Known for: Founder, Mind Dynamics

Alexander Everett (1921–2005) was a British self-improvement and personal development consultant. He was the founder of the company Mind Dynamics, and author of the motivational books The Genius Within You and Inward Bound. Everett's coursework and teachings had an influence on the human potential movement.

Though Mind Dynamics only existed for a few years, it influenced many other forms of companies and self-improvement groups known as Large Group Awareness Training. After Mind Dynamics folded due to the death of its co-owner, William Penn Patrick, and due to investigations on its parent company, Holiday Magic, by the United States government on allegations of pyramid schemes, Everett formed another course called Inward Bound, which he taught in the United States, Europe and Asia.

== Early life ==
Born in England in 1921, Everett was initially inspired by Aldous Huxley's book The Perennial Philosophy. Everett became involved with Christian Science, the Unity School of Christianity, and Rosicrucianism. He also traveled the world in a quest for spirituality and education, visiting Greece, India, and Egypt. Everett also studied Theosophy.

He later settled down in Britain for a while, forming a preparatory school, Pendragon School at Bexhill-on-Sea, in 1950 in Sussex, England. While teaching at the school in Sussex, Everett contracted polio, and was told by his physicians that he would never walk again. Everett believed that he healed himself using the Unity School of Christianity's "Prayer of Faith", by Hannah More Kohaus. In 1959, Everett founded and became the headmaster of Shiplake College at Henley-on-Thames, Oxford, England. Everett later acknowledged that the Unity Church influenced his development of self-improvement courses including Mind Dynamics, and he incorporated Unity techniques such as the use of silence, focusing on the intuitive inner voice, and affirmations into these practices.

== Mind Dynamics ==
In 1962 Everett moved to the United States, first settling in Kansas where he initially intended to become a minister in the Unity School of Christianity. He worked for the Unity Church for a short time in Kansas City. In 1963, Everett gave up his path to becoming a minister, and instead helped establish a preparatory school in Fort Worth, Texas, Fort Worth Country Day School, where he also worked as an instructor. There he also encountered José Silva, founder of the Silva Mind Control method, and began to study techniques of mind control, self-hypnosis, and meditation.

Everett utilized the techniques learned in José Silva's Mind Control methodology, as well as concepts from Edgar Cayce (1877–1945), to form the Mind Dynamics course in 1968. Jess Stearn wrote a book, The Power of Alpha Thinking (1969), on Everett and his Mind Dynamics course.

The students of Mind Dynamics included Dr. O. Carl Simonton of the Simonton Cancer Center.

Mind Dynamics proved a precursor to other groups that used similar techniques. Alexander was referred to as "The Teacher of Teachers" and "The Father of the Human Potential Movement" ... as his employees included Werner Erhard, founder of "est" Erhard Seminars Training and of the Landmark Forum; John Hanley Sr., co-founder with Robert White of Lifespring; James H. and Janet Quinn, founders of LifeStream, LifeResults, LifeSuccess and New Perspectives; Randy Revell, founder of Context Trainings; Tom and Jane Willhite, founders of PSI World; Robert White, founder of ARC and Life Dynamics; Howard Nease, founder of Personal Dynamics; Bill Schwartz, founder of the Meditation Institute of Milwaukee; Stewart Emery, founder of Actualizations Workshop, Russ and Carol Bishop with Insight Seminars.; Robin Clark, one of Everett's first 12 Mind Dynamics trainer/facilitators, later founded Mind Dynamics Institute in Las Vegas Nevada.

The first form of Mind Dynamics was non-confrontational, did not involve direct interaction with course participants, and participants did not share their own personal experiences in the coursework. In 1970, Everett moved the headquarters of his company from Texas to San Francisco, California. William Penn Patrick bought fifty per cent of the company's shares in the same year. Patrick owned Holiday Magic, a cosmetics company, and Leadership Dynamics, a similar company to Mind Dynamics that used more confrontational techniques. Though Mind Dynamics was structured as a for-profit, self-improvement company, it was also described as a spiritual discipline. Everett stated that one of the goals of Mind Dynamics was to "get people to a higher dimension of mind".

Werner Erhard was a student of Everett's, and became an instructor in his own right in the Mind Dynamics training. After reaching the level of instructor, Erhard was also chosen by Everett to be responsible for Mind Dynamics course development. Alexander Everett offered Erhard a vice-presidency in the company and a larger salary, but Erhard instead took his staff (including Laurel Scheaf and Gonneke Spits) to form Erhard Seminars Training. Everett was present in the hotel ballroom when Werner Erhard led his last Mind Dynamics course and announced to the audience that he would be soon forming a new company. Though Everett publicly went up on stage and stated his support for Erhard and expressed his sorrow to see him go, privately he was furious with Erhard for planning his exit and new company behind Everett's back.

Graduate and seminar supporter Robert White joined Mind Dynamics as president and worked with Alexander to spread the course to Australia, England, Italy, Denmark and Finland. The company was closed in 1973 along with Leadership Dynamics and Holiday Magic, partially as a result of William Penn Patrick dying in a plane crash. The United States government investigated allegations of Patrick's companies operating as pyramid schemes. Nevertheless, the Mind Dynamics course still had a huge effect on the New Age movement.

== Later years ==
After Holiday Magic, Leadership Dynamics and Mind Dynamics ceased operating, Everett left the United States in 1974 and studied eastern religions and philosophies in Russia and India. He formed a personal development program named Inward Bound in 1977 and stayed active in the self-improvement industry.

Robert White brought Everett to Japan in 1993 to conduct his Inward Bound seminar with Life Dynamics graduates and to do Trainer Training. Everett also formed a course called "Samata". The Inward Bound course was a two-day seminar that had similar characteristics to his previous coursework, and also incorporated concepts from the Unity Church. Everett continued to teach Inward Bound for over twenty-five years, and gave lectures annually in the United States, Europe and Asia. He also wrote a book on the course, entitled Inward Bound. Everett authored and recorded two audio seminars, "The Genius Within You", and "Inner Wealth" with the Nightingale-Conant Corporation. His final spiritual course "Love, Life and Light" was taught annually over the final 12 years of his life. He recorded these teachings in a 20-hour CD-ROM entitled, "Cosmic Consciousness.

Everett died on January 16, 2005, in Oregon.
