= List of 1981 films based on actual events =

This is a list of films and miniseries released in 1981 that are based on actual events. All films on this list are from American production unless indicated otherwise.

== 1981 ==
- A Sense of Freedom (1981) – British crime drama film based on the autobiography of Glasgow gangster Jimmy Boyle, who was reputed to be Scotland's most violent man
- The Adventures of Nellie Bly (1981) – drama television film about 19th century journalist Nellie Bly and human rights crusader
- Agony (Russian: Агония) (1981) – Soviet biographical drama film based on the final year of Imperial Russia and the psychological portraits of Grigori Rasputin and the Imperial family
- Al Qadisiyya (Arabic: القادسية) (1981) – Egyptian-Iraqi drama film portraying the Battle of al-Qadisiyyah, in which the Islamic army of Sa'd ibn Abi Waqqas (after the death beforehand of Al-Muthanna ibn Haritha) definitively ended the Sassanid Empire by defeating the Persian forces of Rostam Farrokhzad
- Angels of Iron (German: Engel aus Eisen) (1981) – West German crime drama film dramatizing the true story of a Berlin gang of thieves led by juvenile Werner Gladow during the time of the Berlin Blockade and Airlift
- Aszparuh (Bulgarian: Хан Аспарух) (1981) – Bulgarian historical action film depicting the story of Khan Asparuh and the events around the founding of the medieval Bulgarian state in 681 AD
- Bad Blood (1981) – British-New Zealander thriller drama film based on the factual manhunt for mass-murderer Stanley Graham
- Bill (1981) – biographical drama television film based on the life of Bill Sackter
- Bitter Harvest (1981) – drama television film depicting the real-life story of a young farmer's efforts to find out what's killing his dairy herd and afflicting his infant son are hampered by the foot-dragging of state agriculture officials
- The Boat (German: Das Boot) (1981) – West German war drama film based on Lothar-Günther Buchheim's experiences aboard German submarine U-96
- The Boat Is Full (German: Das Boot ist voll) (1981) – Swiss war drama film depicting an account of the true story of six refugees entering Switzerland during World War Two, and the conflicted attitudes of the Swiss villagers and authorities towards Jewish refugees, political refugees, and deserters
- The Borgias (1981) – British historical drama miniseries telling the story of Rodrigo Borgia – the future Pope Alexander VI – and his family, including his son Cesare and daughter Lucrezia
- The Bunker (1981) – historical war television film depicting an account of the history of the Führerbunker in 1945, as well as the last days of German dictator Adolf Hitler
- The Bushido Blade (1981) – historical action drama film focusing on the true events surrounding the treaty Commodore Matthew Perry signed with the shogun of feudal Japan
- Chanel Solitaire (1981) – British-French-American historical drama film telling the story of the early life and rise to fame and fortune of French fashion designer Gabrielle "Coco" Chanel
- Chariots of Fire (1981) – British historical sport drama film based on the true story of two British athletes in the 1924 Olympics: Eric Liddell, a devout Scottish Christian who runs for the glory of God, and Harold Abrahams, an English Jew who runs to overcome prejudice
- Child Bride of Short Creek (1981) – drama television film loosely based upon the 1953 Short Creek raid that had occurred in Colorado City, Arizona, and Hildale, Utah, United States, collectively known as "Short Creek," a community of members of the Fundamentalist Church of Jesus Christ of Latter Day Saints, a group that practices child marriage and polygamy
- The Children Nobody Wanted (1981) – drama television film based on the true story of child advocate Tom Butterfield, the youngest bachelor to become a legal foster parent in the state of Missouri, and his creation of the Butterfield Ranch
- Christiane F. (German: Christiane F. – Wir Kinder vom Bahnhof Zoo) (1981) – West German biographical drama film portraying the descent of Christiane Felscherinow, a bored and depressed 13-year-old growing up in mid-1970s West Berlin, to a 14-year-old heroin addict
- Circle of Power (1981) – thriller drama film based on the nonfiction book The Pit: A Group Encounter Defiled concerning Mind Dynamics (a.k.a. Leadership Dynamics and Holiday Magic)
- Death Hunt (1981) – Western action film depicting a fictionalized account of the Royal Canadian Mounted Police (RCMP) pursuit of a man named Albert Johnson
- Death of a Centerfold (1981) – biographical drama television film dramatizing the life and the murder of Playboy Playmate of the Year Dorothy Stratten
- Don't Look Back: The Story of Leroy 'Satchel' Paige (1981) – biographical sport drama film telling the story of Satchel Paige, star pitcher in the Negro Leagues, and later in the major leagues
- Escape from Iran: The Canadian Caper (1981) – Canadian-American biographical television film about the "Canadian Caper" during the Iranian Revolution and hostage crises
- The Falcon (Serbian: Бановић Страхиња) (1981) – Yugoslav-West German adventure drama film based on Strahinja Banović, a hero of Serbian epic poetry
- The Flame Trees of Thika (1981) – British biographical drama miniseries dealing with the lives of British settlers in the town of Thika in Kenya's Central Province in 1913, when the country was a British colony, up to the start of World War One
- Gallipoli (1981) – Australian war drama film revolving around several young men from Western Australia who enlist in the Australian Army during the First World War who were sent to the peninsula of Gallipoli in the Ottoman Empire (in modern-day Turkey), where they took part in the Gallipoli campaign
- The Gangster Chronicles (1981) – crime drama miniseries about the lives of gangsters Bugsy Siegel, Lucky Luciano and Meyer Lansky
- The Girl with the Red Hair (Dutch: Het meisje met het rode haar) (1981) – Dutch drama film based on the biography of resistance fighter Hannie Schaft
- Grambling's White Tiger (1981) – sport drama television film about the true story of Jim Gregory, the first white quarterback of the Grambling Tigers at Grambling College, a historically black college, in 1962
- Hoodwink (1981) – Australian crime thriller film based on the true story of a well-publicised Australian con artist
- Inchon (1981) – American-South Korean epic war film about the Battle of Inchon, considered to be the turning point of the Korean War
- Jacqueline Bouvier Kennedy (1981) – biographical drama television film focusing on the former First Lady's years in D.C., from working as a newspaper's "Inquiring Camera Girl" to meeting and being courted by Rep. Jack Kennedy to life on the campaign trail and into the White House
- The Killing of Randy Webster (1981) – drama television film based on a true story of a father's tireless investigation into the killing of his teenage son by Houston police in a stolen van chase, prompted by his inability to accept police claims that the boy was carrying a gun
- Kisapmata (1981) – Filipino psychological horror film chronicling the events leading up to the highly publicized familicide committed by Pablo Cabading, a retired policeman
- The Life and Times of David Lloyd George (1981) – biographical drama miniseries about David Lloyd George, the final Liberal prime minister of the UK
- Lili Marleen (1981) – West German romantic drama film recounting the love affair between a German singer who becomes the darling of the nation, based on Lale Andersen, and a Swiss conductor, based on Rolf Liebermann, who is active in saving his fellow Jews
- The Man Who Saw Tomorrow (1981) – biographical drama film about the predictions of French astrologer and physician Michel de Notredame (Nostradamus)
- The Marva Collins Story (1981) – biographical drama television film about the life of Chicago-based African-American teacher Marva Collins
- Mephisto (1981) – Hungarian-Austrian-West German historical drama film about a German stage actor (modeled on Gustaf Gründgens) who finds unexpected success and mixed blessings in the popularity of his performance in a Faustian play as the Nazis take power in pre-WWII Germany
- The Miracle of Kathy Miller (1981) – sport drama television film based on the real-life story of a Scottsdale, Arizona teenager who was critically injured in a 1977 car accident
- Miracle on Ice (1981) – sport drama television film about the United States men's national ice hockey team, led by head coach Herb Brooks, that won the gold medal
- Mommie Dearest (1981) – biographical psychological drama film following Christina Crawford's and her brother Christopher's upbringing under their adoptive mother, actress Joan Crawford, depicting her as abusive, controlling, and manipulative, prioritizing her Hollywood career over her family
- Murder in Texas (1981) – drama television film based on the true story of the death of Joan Robinson Hill
- Outlaw: The Saga of Gisli (Icelandic: Útlaginn) (1981) – Icelandic biographical drama film telling the story of a blood feud set in 10th-century Iceland
- The People vs. Jean Harris (1981) – crime drama television film about the trial of Jean Harris, the convicted murderer of Herman Tarnower
- Peter and Paul (1981) – Christian drama miniseries covering much of the Book of Acts in its Biblical re-telling of chapters 8 through 28, including the apostolic missionary journeys and interactions of Peter the Fisherman and Paul of Tarsus
- Priest of Love (1981) – British biographical romantic drama film about the life of D. H. Lawrence and his wife, Frieda
- Prince of the City (1981) – neo-noir crime drama film based on the life of Robert Leuci, called ‘Daniel Ciello’ in the film, an officer of the New York Police Department who chooses, for idealistic reasons, to expose corruption in the force
- Ragtime (1981) – drama film set in and around turn-of-the-century New York City, New Rochelle, and Atlantic City, and includes fictionalized references to actual people and events of the time
- Reds (1981) – epic historical drama film about the life and career of John Reed, the journalist and writer who chronicled the October Revolution in Russia in his 1919 book Ten Days That Shook the World
- Rise and Fall of Idi Amin (1981) – Kenyan-Nigerian-British biographical crime film detailing the controversial actions and atrocities of the former dictator of Uganda, Idi Amin Dada, during his violent rise to power in 1971 until his overthrow in 1979 as the result of the Uganda–Tanzania War
- The Search for Alexander the Great (1981) – British-American adventure miniseries about Alexander the Great
- Skokie (1981) – drama television film based on a real life controversy in Skokie, Illinois, involving the National Socialist Party of America
- St. Helens (1981) – adventure drama film centring on the events leading up to the cataclysmic 1980 eruption of Mount St. Helens in Washington, with the story beginning on the day volcanic activity started on 20 March 1980, and ending on the day of the eruption, 18 May 1980
- Stand by Your Man (1981) – biographical drama miniseries based on the life of Tammy Wynette, the country music superstar, including her tumultuous marriage to fellow star George Jones
- Teheran 43 (Russian: Тегеран-43; French: Téhéran 43, Nid d'espions) (1981) – Soviet-French-Swiss thriller film based on events around Operation Long Jump, the 1943 attempt by Nazi Germany to assassinate Winston Churchill, Joseph Stalin and Franklin Delano Roosevelt during the Tehran Conference
- Twenty Six Days from the Life of Dostoyevsky (Russian: Двадцать шесть дней из жизни Достоевского) (1981) – Soviet biographical romantic drama film about writer Fyodor Dostoevsky
- Tyagayya (Telugu: త్యాగయ్య) (1981) – Indian Telugu-language biographical drama film based on the life of Saint, Singer, and composer Tyagaraja
- The Wave (1981) – drama television film based on The Third Wave experiment put on by teacher Ron Jones to explain to his students how the German populace could accept the actions of the Nazi regime
- Winston Churchill: The Wilderness Years (1981) – British biographical drama miniseries based on Winston Churchill's years in enforced exile from political position during the 1920s and 1930s
- Wrong Side of the Road (1981) – Australian biographical drama film showing 48 hours in the lives of members of the Aboriginal bands, No Fixed Address and Us Mob, including the racism, hostility and harassment they receive
