= Outrageous Betrayal =

Book by Steven Pressman

- Front cover
- Author: Steven Pressman
- Cover artist: Richard Oriolo, design
- Language: English
- Subject: Erhard Seminars Training, Werner Erhard
- Publisher: St. Martin's Press
- Publication date: September 1993
- Publication place: United States
- Media type: Print (Hardcover)
- Pages: 289
- ISBN: 0-312-09296-2
- OCLC: 27897209
- Dewey Decimal: 158 B 20
- LC Class: RC489.E7 P74 1993

Outrageous Betrayal: The Dark Journey of Werner Erhard from est to Exile is a non-fiction book written by freelance journalist Steven Pressman and first published in 1993 by St. Martin's Press. The book gives an account of Werner Erhard's early life as Jack Rosenberg, his exploration of various forms of self-help techniques, and his foundation of Erhard Seminars Training "est" and later of Werner Erhard and Associates and of the est successor course, "The Forum". Pressman details the rapid financial success Erhard had with these companies, as well as controversies relating to litigation involving former participants in his courses. The work concludes by going over the impact of a March 3, 1991 60 Minutes broadcast on CBS where members of Erhard's family made allegations against him, and Erhard's decision to leave the United States.

Representatives of Werner Erhard and of Landmark Worldwide, the successor company to The Forum, regarded the book as being "defamatory".

== Author ==
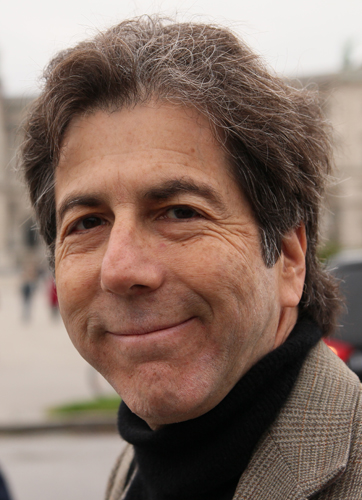
Steven Pressman (2008)

Pressman worked as a journalist after graduating from college in 1977. He worked as a journalist for Orange City News, the Los Angeles Daily Journal, California Lawyer magazine, and Congressional Quarterly's Weekly Report. During his time performing research for and writing Outrageous Betrayal, Pressman published articles for the Legal Times newspaper and wrote articles and served as a senior editor for California Republic. In 1993, Pressman worked as a San Francisco-based legal journalist for California Lawyer.

== Research ==
In the "Acknowledgments" section of Outrageous Betrayal, Pressman wrote that he relied upon both named and unnamed sources for information in the book, in addition to "previously published accounts, court transcripts, depositions, and other documents in which various individuals have recounted earlier conversations". In an article on fair use for Columbia Journalism Review, Pressman noted that he "gathered reams of written materials -- some of it private and confidential -- that were helpful in drawing a comprehensive portrait of my subject". In the Daily Journal, Pressman wrote that legal counsel for the book's publisher insisted on numerous changes to the book "in order to reduce, if not eliminate, the possibility of a successful suit for copyright infringement".

By 1993, Pressman and St. Martin's Press had received approximately two dozen letters from Erhard's attorney Walter Maksym, though Erhard's representatives had yet to see the book itself. Maksym told the San Francisco Daily Journal in March 1993 that he wanted to "fact-check the book", because he believed that "this is a first-time unknown author who apparently has interviewed only people who have negative things to say", and stated "We have cautioned the publisher that they are responsible for the accuracy of the book." Charlie Spicer, a senior editor at St. Martin's Press, described the actions of Erhard's representatives with regard to the book as "a desperate campaign by someone with something to hide". The author himself made specific reference to his legal support, mentioning "the potential legal rapids that confront authors writing these days about controversial subjects".

== Contents ==
In Outrageous Betrayal, Steven Pressman gives a chronological account of Erhard's life and businesses, from high-school years through his formation of companies that delivered awareness training and the later controversies surrounding his business and family life. The book goes into detail regarding his early life as Jack Rosenberg and his name-change to Werner Erhard, his move to California, and the initial inspirations behind the training that would become "est". Pressman writes that Erhard took inspiration from the self-help course Mind Dynamics, cybernetics, from the books Think and Grow Rich by Napoleon Hill, and Psycho-Cybernetics by Maxwell Maltz, and from Scientology and the writings of L. Ron Hubbard. He also notes how an attorney skilled in tax law helped Erhard in forming his first awareness-training company, Erhard Seminars Training.

Pressman notes how Erhard and his businesses became successful within two years of foundation, and writes that his awareness-training programs trained over half a million people in his courses and brought in tens of millions of dollars in revenue. The book then describes controversies relating to both Erhard's businesses and his reported treatment of his family. Pressman also describes the successor company to Est, Werner Erhard and Associates, and Erhard's decision to sell the "technology" of his course The Forum to his employees and to leave the United States. The book's epilogue includes a firsthand account of a Landmark Forum seminar led by the former Est-trainer Laurel Scheaf in 1992.

== Reception ==
St. Martin's Press first published Outrageous Betrayal in 1993, and Random House published a second edition of the text in 1995.

An analysis in Kirkus Reviews, noting the choice of title by the author, asserted that Pressman: "makes no pretense to objectivity here." Kirkus Reviews criticized the book, saying "What the author dramatically fails to provide by bearing down on the negative (to the extent that nearly all his informants denounce est and its founder) is any real understanding of est's teachings--and of why they appealed so deeply to so many." Paul S. Boyer, professor of history at the University of Wisconsin–Madison, reviewed the book in The Washington Post. Boyer wrote that the book "nicely recounts the bizarre tale" of Werner Erhard, saying "Pressman tells his fascinating story well." However he also commented that the book gives "only the sketchiest historical context" of est and its roots in societal experiences.

A review by Mary Carroll published in the American Library Association's Booklist noted that the controversy surrounding Erhard was not new, but she wrote that "Pressman pulls the details together effectively." Carroll went on to comment: "Outrageous Betrayal is a disturbing but fascinating object lesson in the power of charisma divorced from conscience." Frances Halpern of the Los Angeles Times called the book a "damning biography".

In 1995, Outrageous Betrayal was cited in a report on the United States Department of Transportation by the United States House of Representatives Committee on Appropriations in a case unrelated to Erhard or Est. This was in reference to a Congressional investigation of Gregory May and controversial trainings given by his company Gregory May Associates (GMA) to the Federal Aviation Administration. The testimony given stated that, according to Outrageous Betrayal, a member of GMA's board had been influenced by Erhard Seminars Training and the Church of Scientology.

== See also ==
- Human Potential Movement
- Journalism sourcing
- Large Group Awareness Training
