= Self religion =

Religion which focuses on improvement of the self

A self religion (or self-religion) is a religious or self-improvement group which has as one of its primary aims the improvement of the self. The term "self religion" was coined by Paul Heelas and other scholars of religion have adopted/adapted the description. King's College London scholar Peter Bernard Clarke builds on Heelas's concept of self religion to describe the class of "Religions of the True Self".

== Scope ==
Hanegraaff notes that "self religion" may equate to New Age spirituality in general. Author Michael York writes, "If 'self-religion' means personal exegesis and selection by the individual, the general rubric is applicable to trends in the late modern/early postmodern transition, which encompass much more than simply New Age and Neo-pagan religiosities." Eileen Barker, in her 1999 book New Religious Movements: their incidence and significance, said that they were "toward the New Age end of the NRM spectrum". Massimo Introvigne, an Italian sociologist of religion, describe "self religion" as "a deep but vague and unorganized interest in the sacred".

== Examples ==
Groups characterized as (or associated with the concepts of) self religions or "religions of the True Self" include:

- Arica
- the Emin Foundation
- est has been called "the most important of the self religions"
- Exegesis (an est-offshoot)
- The Gurdjieff Work. Heelas traces some self-religions to the tradition of Gurdjieff:
- Insight Seminars
- Landmark Forum (a derivative of est)
- the Life Training (Kairos Foundation)
- Mind Dynamics
- Movement of Spiritual Inner Awareness (MSIA)
- Rastafari
- LaVeyan Satanism
- the School of Economic Science
- the Church of Scientology is characterized by Heelas as "one of the best known self-religions"
- Silva Mind Control
