= Living Word Fellowship =

Living Word Fellowship (LWF) was a millenarian Pentecostal Christian group based in the San Francisco Bay area, founded in 1970 by Bobbi Morris. It encouraged its members to "Get high on Jesus." Most of its members were young adults who had been involved in the counterculture of the 1960s and had used marijuana and psychedelic drugs, and about one-third of them had participated in radical political protests. In LWF, they replaced their counterculture lifestyles with a culture characterized by moral authoritarianism and Pentecostal worship practices such as speaking in tongues.

In the 1982 book Getting Saved From the Sixties: Moral Meaning in Conversion and Cultural Change, Steven Tipton, a sociologist of religion, profiled LWF, a Zen Buddhist meditation center and Werner Erhard's est as representing three different styles of response to the experience of cultural change in the 1960s.
