= Leadership Dynamics =

- Company type: For-profit, private
- Genre: Self-improvement
- Founded: 1967
- Founder: William Penn Patrick
- Defunct: 1973
- Headquarters: California, United States
- Area served: National
- Key people: Alexander Everett
- Services: personal development
- Owner: William Penn Patrick
- Subsidiaries: Mind Dynamics, Holiday Magic

Leadership Dynamics, also known as Leadership Dynamics Institute (LDI), was a private, for-profit company, owned by William Penn Patrick. The company focused on executive training, personal development and self-improvement. Leadership Dynamics was the first form of what psychologists termed "Large Group Awareness Training".

== History ==
William Penn Patrick wrote a booklet entitled Happiness and Success through Principle, in 1967, and founded Leadership Dynamics based on those principles. Every employee in the management of Holiday Magic were then expected to take part in the Leadership Dynamics coursework, which was described as having "overtones of strict military training techniques."

William Penn Patrick was the financial backer of the company, and also provided the financial backing for Holiday Magic and Alexander Everett's Mind Dynamics. Patrick stated that students of the Leadership Dynamics Institute would be able to lead "a more creative and constructive life." Patrick utilized the principles of Everett's Mind Dynamics in his company.

Ben Gay, a high-level instructor at Leadership Dynamics, was President of Holiday Magic in the United States. Though he claimed Leadership Dynamics was a separate company, "...in no way related to Holiday Magic, Inc.", author Gene Church pointed out many inconsistencies in this statement. According to a lawsuit brought against Holiday Magic by the Securities and Exchange Commission, in order to advance to the positions of Instructor General, Trainer General, and Senior General within the company, employees were mandated to take part in the Leadership Dynamics training.

In 1970, William Penn Patrick bought Mind Dynamics, and the Leadership Dynamics coursework soon became popular in the United States, Europe, and Australia. However, Patrick's businesses became involved in pyramid schemes, and Leadership Dynamics, Holiday Magic, and Mind Dynamics shut down in 1973.

== Techniques ==
Michael Langone wrote in Business and Society Review that Leadership Dynamics was one of the first "transformational trainings". The extreme form of human potential movement training led to a series of lawsuits for the company. This extreme training involved subjecting course participants to abusive practices such as beating, food and sleep deprivation, being placed inside coffins, and degrading sexual acts.

Lawsuits against the company by former participants in the coursework alleged that students were sexually abused and tortured, including being placed in coffins or on crosses. The non-fiction book, The Pit: A Group Encounter Defiled described some of these practices in great detail, and this was later made into a film, Circle of Power.

== Influence ==
Langone noted that many forms of transformational trainings were at the least, indirectly influenced by Leadership Dynamics.

While working for Holiday Magic, Lifespring founder John Hanley attended a course at Leadership Dynamics. Chris Mathe, at the time a Ph.D. candidate in clinical psychology, wrote that most of today's current forms of Large-Group Awareness Training were modeled after the Leadership Dynamics Institute. Mathe cited Lifespring, Insight Seminars, PSI Seminars, New Warriors, and Impact as groups that were influenced by Leadership Dynamics.
