= The Pit: A Group Encounter Defiled =

Narrative nonfiction book by Gene Church, and Conrad D. Carnes

- Book cover, 1972 hardcover ed.
- Author: Gene Church; Conrad D. Carnes
- Cover artist: Antupit & Others (Jacket); Henry Wolf (photograph)
- Language: English
- Subject: Mind Dynamics, Holiday Magic, Leadership Dynamics
- Genre: Non-fiction
- Publisher: Outerbridge & Lazard, Inc.
- Publication date: 1972
- Publication place: United States
- Media type: Hardcover
- Pages: 161
- ISBN: 0-87690-087-2
- Followed by: Circle of Power (film)

The Pit: A Group Encounter Defiled is a work of narrative nonfiction concerning book on Mind Dynamics (a.k.a. Leadership Dynamics and Holiday Magic), written by Gene Church and Conrad D. Carnes. The book was published Outerbridge & Lazard, Inc., in 1972, and was republished in a paperback edition in 1973, by Pocket Books. The book was later the basis for the 1983 film, Circle of Power. The title refers to the encounter group movement that was prevalent at the time, which evolved into what psychologists began to term Large Group Awareness Training.

The Pit: A Group Encounter Defiled is listed in the 1987 edition of Best Sellers, at the University of Scranton archives. The book was featured in The New York Review of Books, in 1973.

== Authors ==
Gene Church had previously studied psychology at Ohio State University and Ohio University. He had enrolled in the Leadership Dynamics coursework as a requirement of his association with Holiday Magic. At the time of the book's publication, Conrad D. Carnes was an attorney practicing law with the firm of Carnes & Hornbeck in Columbus, Ohio.

The authors later wrote a follow-up book, Brainwash, in 1983. Gene Church also gave a related lecture series at universities, entitled: "An encounter group horror story."

== Summary ==
Events depicted in the book took place over four-days at the Hyatt House motel in Palo Alto, California, and included management executives from Holiday Magic. The book revealed details of the events that went on during the coursework at Mind Dynamics and Leadership Dynamics. The book stated that Holiday Magic participants in the Leadership Dynamics sessions were required to register in the coursework, at a cost of US$1,000, "..in order to get ahead in the company." Golembiewski stated that the book described "illustrative chapter and verse" of the coursework, including such training aids as a cross, a coffin, oxygen bottles, and piano wire. Participants that instructors deemed as "dead" to their lives, were told to stay in the coffin until they realized "..how much it means to be alive." Leadership Dynamics instructors felt that by putting individuals in a cage, they would "..appreciate the value of the freedom that they already possess." The cross was used to demonstrate what it felt like to be persecuted at work. There was also a "silver chalice", which was supposed to "..make each man face the truth honestly and so to understand himself and others better.."

== Cited by other works ==
The Pit: A Group Encounter Defiled has been cited in academic journal articles which analyze encounter groups and large group awareness training, including the Journal of Humanistic Psychology, and more recently in Human Resource Development Review, in 2005. The book has also been cited as a reference in other works which discuss these subjects, including Organization Development, Approaches to Planned Change, The Regulation of Psychotherapists, Handbook of Organizational Consultation, Managing Diversity in Organizations, and Self Realization.
