= Evaluating a Large Group Awareness Training =

1990 non-fiction psychology book

- Book cover, 1990 ed.
- Author: Jeffrey D. Fisher; Roxane Cohen Silver; Jack M. Chinsky; Barry Goff; Yechiel Klar
- Language: English
- Series: Recent research in psychology
- Subject: Large Group Awareness Training
- Genre: Psychology
- Publisher: Springer-Verlag
- Publication date: 1990
- Publication place: United States
- Media type: Hardcover
- Pages: 142
- ISBN: 0-387-97320-6
- OCLC: 21563816
- Dewey Decimal: 302
- LC Class: HM134 .E93 1990

Evaluating a Large Group Awareness Training: A Longitudinal Study of Psychosocial Effects is a non-fiction psychology book on Large Group Awareness Training, published in 1990 by Springer-Verlag. The book was co-authored by psychologists Jeffrey D. Fisher, Roxane Cohen Silver, Jack M. Chinsky, Barry Goff, and Yechiel Klar. The book was based on a psychological study of "The Forum", a course at the time run by Werner Erhard and Associates, the company that commissioned the research. Werner Erhard and Associates financed the study, providing US$88,000 in funding for research of its program. Results of the study were published in two articles in the Journal of Consulting and Clinical Psychology in 1989 and 1990. Fisher and co-authors gave initial context for the study, providing analysis and discussion of academic literature in psychology regarding Large Group Awareness Training.

The psychologists analyzed whether Large Group Awareness Training could be classified as psychotherapy, and attempted to determine whether these techniques are harmful, beneficial, or produce no effects to an individual's mental health. Participants included individuals that took part in a 1985 program of "The Forum" in the Northeastern United States. They were told they were participating in a "Quality of Life" study, and were instructed to fill out surveys about their experiences at time intervals prior to and after the program's completion. The sample size included 83 participants in the program, as well as an additional 52 sample groups of individuals that did not participate in "The Forum". The psychologists concluded that the Large Group Awareness Training program did not have lasting positive or negative effects on self-perception.

The study reported in Evaluating a Large Group Awareness Training was well received by the authors' peers; and garnered recognition from the American Psychological Association with its 1989 "National Psychological Consultants to Management Award". Ethics in Psychology: Professional Standards and Cases characterized the study as, "One of the few careful attempts to study Erhard's techniques in a rigorous fashion". The Group in Society, published in 2009, characterized the authors' research as "the most rigorous independent study to date" of Large Group Awareness Training. The psychologists' research has been referenced in a 2005 study on Large Group Awareness Training published by the British Psychological Society, and a 2010 article in Nova Religio published by University of California Press.

== Authors ==
Jeffrey D. Fisher obtained his Ph.D. from Purdue University, where he specialized in the study of social psychology. He is a professor of psychology, at the University of Connecticut. Fisher founded and serves as director of the Center for Health, Intervention, and Prevention (CHIP) at the University of Connecticut. He is co-author of the book Environmental Psychology, with Paul A. Bell and Andrew Baum.

Roxane Cohen Silver received her Ph.D. degree from Northwestern University. In 1989, Silver worked in research at the University of California, Los Angeles. Silver maintained a focus in the field of social psychology. In 2006, she was a professor in the Department of Psychology and Social Behavior at the Department of Medicine at the University of California, Irvine. Silver was recognized in 2007 with the American Psychological Association Award for Distinguished Service to Psychological Science.

Jack M. Chinsky has worked as a professor of psychology at the University of Connecticut. He specialized in the field of community psychology. Chinsky maintained a focus on community relationships. In 2005, Chinsky practiced clinical psychology in Connecticut, and was a professor emeritus at the University of Connecticut after teaching at the institution for 30 years.

Barry Alan Goff graduated with a doctorate in social psychology, and was an instructor at the University of Connecticut in its graduate program for adult educators. Goff obtained master's degrees in counseling psychology, and American literature. He is the author of Social Support Among Best Friends. He has worked in the field of consulting, with a focus in workforce performance and customer satisfaction. Goff consulted for the United States Department of Labor in these areas, and advised in developing performance management systems for the Connecticut Department of Labor, the city of Philadelphia, Pennsylvania, and the Commonwealth of Kentucky.

Yechiel Klar obtained B.A., M.A. and Ph.D. degrees from Tel Aviv University. He became a faculty member of the Department of Psychology at Tel Aviv University in 1990, and later was selected for the position of Senior Lecturer at the university. Klar has taught in the capacity of visiting professor at the University of Connecticut, Lehigh University, University of Kansas, and Carleton University. He is an editor of Self Change: Social Psychological and Clinical Perspectives.

== Study arrangements ==
The book was based on a psychological study of "The Forum", a course at the time run by Werner Erhard and Associates. The results of the research study itself had been previously published in the Journal of Consulting and Clinical Psychology in 1989, by Fisher, et al., and in 1990 in the same journal by Klar, et al.

The study was conducted under an agreement between Werner Erhard and Associates and the researchers, which gave the researchers independence in research methods. The agreement itself is attached as an appendix to the work, and states: "The Forum Sponsor agrees to arrange for all payments for costs related to expenses in the following manner. The only specific fixed cost delineated by this agreement was "piloting experimental procedures and developing a full proposal for subsequent research."

Evaluating a Large Group Awareness Training provides a historical analysis of the research published in academic journals and books prior to the publication of the study. Notable studies analyzed and put into a methodological context by Fisher et al. included those of Cinnamon, Rome, Brewer, Conway, Glass, Kirsch, Baer, Berger, Beit-Hallahmi, and Lieberman.

== Methods ==
The book analyzed whether Large Group Awareness Training could be classified as psychotherapy, and attempted to determine whether these techniques are harmful, beneficial, or produce no effects to an individual's mental health. Participants were told that the psychologists were studying the "Quality of Life" in North America. These participants included men and women that had attended Werner Erhard and Associates' "The Forum" seminar in 1985, in a large city in the northeastern United States. Participants in the study were split into Group 1 and Group 2. Group 1 was told to fill out a questionnaire both prior to and after completing their "Forum". Group 2 was told only to fill out the questionnaire after completing their Forum course.

The sample size included 83 individuals who had taken part in "The Forum", as well as an additional 52 sample groups for comparison, composed of individuals who had similar baseline characteristics to the sample Forum participants, but had not taken part in the course. The belief systems and characteristics of the participants were studied by Fisher and his team of psychologists four to six weeks before they took part in the course, four to six weeks after completing the course, and then again at a period 18 months after finishing the course. Qualities examined by Fisher were based upon the purported benefits, and included character traits, physical and emotional health, social competence, self-esteem, and life satisfaction.

== Conclusions ==
Fisher and his co-authors concluded that attending The Forum had minimal lasting effects, positive or negative, on participants' self-perception. They briefly discussed potential negative and positive effects of attending The Forum. The psychologists found minimal negative effects on the test subjects who participated in their study. In an analysis of the possible positive outcomes, they found that subjects "became more internally oriented". A significant small increase in short term perception by individuals that they maintained control over their lives was observed – this is referred to in psychology as internal locus of control.

The researchers found that subjects had some minor short-term positive effects perceived from the Large Group Awareness Training, but no noticeable longer-term positive effects, stating: "In fact, with the exception of the short-term multivariate results for Perceived Control, there was no appreciable effect on any dimension which could reflect positive change." After the participants returned for the 18-month follow-up analysis, the results revealed that the small increase in perception of control by the individuals had disappeared.

== Reception ==
The research reported in Evaluating a Large Group Awareness Training garnered the American Psychological Association's "National Psychological Consultants to Management Award", in 1989. Writing in their 1994 book, Handbook of Group Psychotherapy, authors Addie Fuhriman and Gary M. Burlingame cited the Fisher study, and compared it to a study of another Large Group Awareness Training organization called Lifespring. The authors observed that "Fisher et al. reported no systematic changes in self-esteem compared to their control group." Handbook of Group Psychotherapy recommended the study, "For a more detailed review of the LGAT literature". The "bulk of evidence" presented in a section of the Handbook of Group Psychotherapy discussing est relied upon results from the Fisher study.

"One of the few careful attempts to study Erhard's techniques in a rigorous fashion"

— Ethics in Psychology

Authors Gerald Koocher and Patricia Keith-Spiegel cited the study in their 1998 book, Ethics in Psychology: Professional Standards and Cases. They characterized the study as, "One of the few careful attempts to study Erhard's techniques in a rigorous fashion". Koocher and Keith Spiegel noted that the Fisher study, "showed no long-term treatment effects and concluded that claims of far-reaching effects for programs of the Forum were found to be exaggerated."

In a discussion of Werner Erhard's programs in his 2003 book, Psychological Foundations of Success, author Stephen J. Kraus cited the Fisher study and contrasted conclusions from it with stated results from course participants. Kraus wrote, "People who attend est or the Landmark Forum generally report positive benefits from the experience, but a study that compared attendees with a control group of non-attendees suggests that the seminar produces only a short-term boost in locus of control, and no measurable long-term effects."

Writing in the 2006 book, Help at Any Cost, author Maia Szalavitz referenced the Fisher study in a discussion of the phenomenon of testimonials regarding perceived outcomes by participants from taking part in Large Group Awareness Training. Szalavitz noted, "The little research conducted on the outcomes of these seminars doesn't even find them effective at prompting positive change. Most participants find the experience profoundly moving—and many people believe that such an emotionally intense event must necessarily produce psychological improvement. Consequently, an overwhelming majority of participants, when surveyed afterward, say their lives were changed for the better. However, several studies (including one of Lifespring) have found that while participants say their LGAT experiences improve their lives, there was no positive effect, or a small, short-lived one, on their actual psychological problems and behavior."

In the 2009 book The Group in Society, author John Gastil discussed Large Group Awareness Training programs including Erhard Seminars Training (est), Lifespring, and "The Forum", and wrote, "In the most rigorous independent study to date, a team of researchers led by psychologist Jeffrey Fisher obtained permission to study the impact of participation in a training process sponsored by Werner Erhard and Associates." Gastil noted, "In the short term, average Forum participants experienced a small but significant increase in their sense that the course of their life was under their own control—what psychologists call an 'internal locus of control.' In the eighteen month follow-up, however, even this slight boost had disappeared and no other changes emerged. This suggests that even when participants subjectively sense self-transformation through a group process such as the Forum, one may not actually have occurred."

The book was referenced in a college-level psychology course, "Developmental Effects of Participation in a Large Group Awareness Training", at the University of Minnesota. A 2005 study published by the British Psychological Society which analyzed the Landmark Forum course cited Evaluating a Large Group Awareness Training for background on the Large Group Awareness Training phenomenon, as did a 2010 study in Nova Religio published by University of California Press.

== See also ==
- Getting It: The Psychology of est
- Large Group Awareness Training
- List of Large Group Awareness Training organizations
- Outrageous Betrayal
