= Jim Selman =

American management consultant, coach, and author (1942–2024)

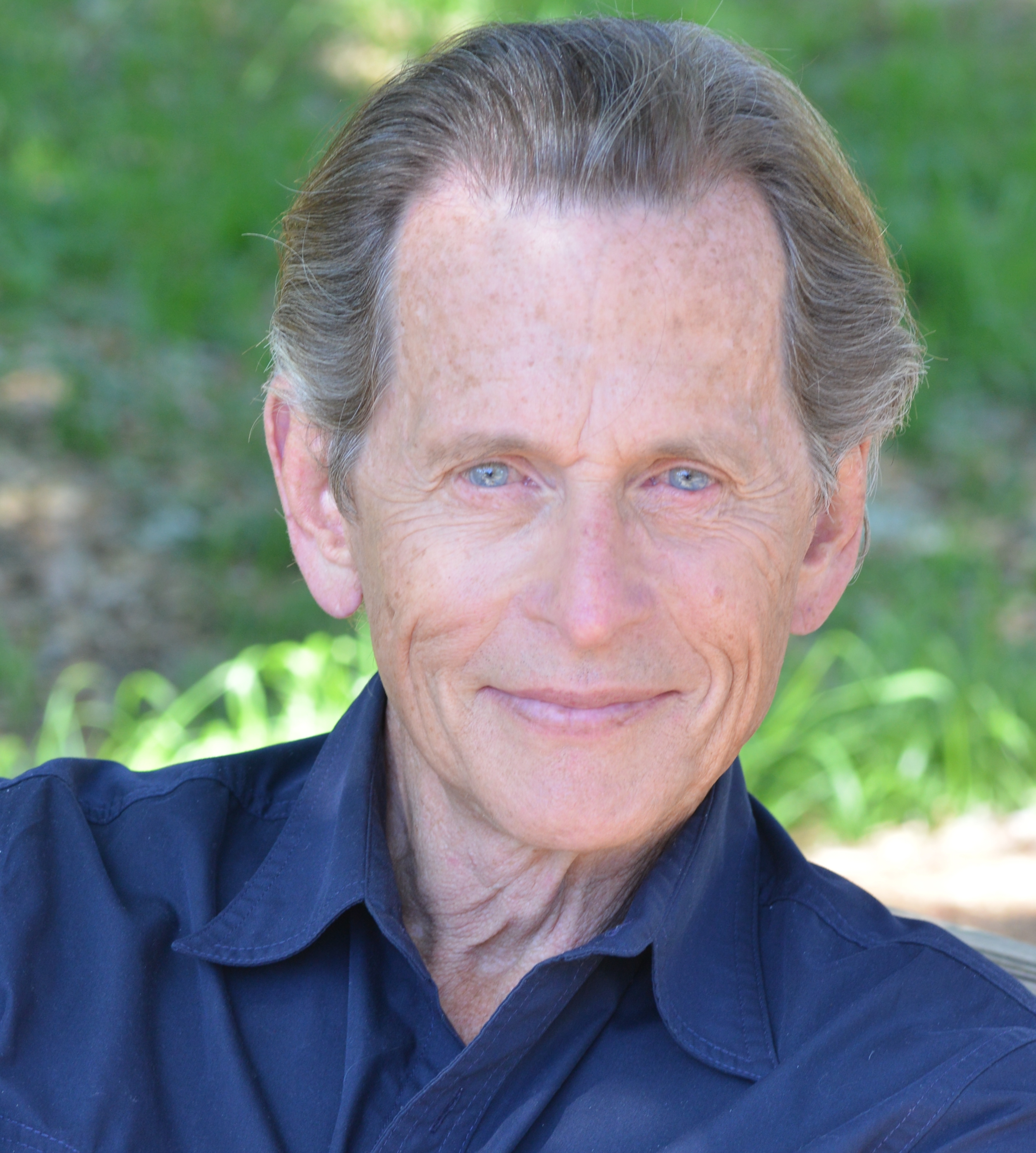
- Selman in 2016
- Born: James C. Selman; February 7, 1942; Oklahoma City, Oklahoma, U.S.
- Died: December 29, 2024 (aged 82); Ojai, California, U.S.
- Education: University of Oklahoma (BA)
- Occupations: Management consultant, executive coach, author
- Known for: Organizational coaching, management consulting, leadership development

James C. "Jim" Selman (February 7, 1942 – December 29, 2024) was an American management consultant, coach, and author whose work focused on organizational transformation, leadership, and management coaching. He was a co-founder of Transformational Technologies, a consulting and training organization associated with Werner Erhard, and subsequently headed Paracomm Partners International. With management scholar Roger D. Evered, he coauthored the 1989 article "Coaching and the Art of Management", which advocated coaching as an alternative model for organizational management. Selman later addressed leadership in conditions of rapid technological and social change, as well as the possibilities for personal development in later life. His books included Retiring Right (2007), The Elder (2011), Living in a Real-Time World (2018), and Serene Ambition in a Real-Time World (2020).

== Biography ==
Born in Oklahoma City, Selman received his BA from the University of Oklahoma in 1965, where he majored in social psychology and philosophy.

Selman is described as being "in the forefront in helping major companies embrace the concept" of "contextual management". He formed Selman & Associates in 1976, and "began research into the nature of culture and large-scale systems change". In 1984, he partnered with Werner Erhard to form Transformational Technologies, a consulting and training franchise operation, which served as the corporate division of Werner Erhard & Associates, with Selman as its first president. In his capacity there, he was noted to have said of his philosophy of management, "when we talk management technology, what we are talking about is a rigorously tested and challenged body of distinction for having access to whatever the phenomenon of management really is".

In October 1987, Selman moderated a televised broadcast that featured Werner Erhard in discussion with top sports coaches John Wooden, Red Auerbach, Timothy Gallwey, and George Allen discussing principles of coaching across all disciplines. They sought to identify distinctions found in coaching, regardless of the subject being coached. In 1989, with the late Professor Roger Evered (U.S. Naval Graduate School at Monterrey), Selman documented the outcome in the first article on organizational coaching, titled "Coaching and the Art of Management". In another article, "Leadership and Innovation: Relating to Circumstances and Change", Selman identifies six ways of responding to change.

Selman was described as "an enormously powerful man with a deep voice and a way of speaking that held people's attention and inspired confidence". Selman & Associates became Paracomm Partners International in 1988. Selman was the host and co-producer with Phyllis Haynes of the podcast and web program Possible Futures, conversations and commentary to explore ideas and decision making and their relationship to possible futures.

Selman's later interests extended to the experience of aging and the possibilities for continued personal development after retirement. He was a former member of the California Commission on Aging, a founder of the nonprofit organization Growing Older, a founding member of the Legacy XXI Institute, and a former director of the Breakthrough Foundation. In 2021, Selman published The Elder, coauthored with Marc B. Cooper, using a fictional narrative to explore the transition from conventional retirement to an active conception of elderhood. Reviewing the book for Itineraries, Barbara Kammerlohr criticized the initially negative portrayal of the protagonist's circumstances, which she suggested might discourage readers from continuing, but praised the book's subsequent treatment of personal growth and purposeful aging, describing it as "a short and stimulating book".

Selman died at his home in Ojai, California, at age 82.

== Bibliography ==
- "Managers Anonymous," New Management, 1988 (Vol. 6, Issue 2)
- "Coaching and the Art of Management," Organizational Dynamics, 1989
- "Coaching: Beyond Management," 10-hour video course & workbook, 1989
- "Rethinking the Fundamentals," Canadian Utilities Limited (internal corporate publication), 1990
- "Rethinking Commitment to Change" with Layton Fisher, Journal of Management Inquiry, 1992
- "Ground Rules for Effective Teams," TransAlta Utilities (internal corporate publication), 1992
- "Empowering Organizational Culture," TransAlta Utilities (internal corporate publication), 1992
- "Dialogue on Commitment," Journal of Management Inquiry, 1995
- "Leadership and Innovation: Relating to Circumstances and Change", The Innovation Journal, 2002
- Retiring Right The Freeway Guide: How to Invent the Rest of Your Life! (Audiobook; Waterside, 2007)
- Leadership (2007)
- The Elder (with Dr. Marc B. Cooper; Sahalie Press, 2011)
- Living in a Real-Time World: 6 Capabilities to Prepare Us for an Unimaginable Future (Jan 7, 2019)
- Serene Ambition in a Real-Time World (with Shae Hadden; Aug 27, 2020)
