= LGAT =

LGAT may refer to:

- Large-group awareness training, activities which are usually offered by groups with links to the human potential movement
- LGAT, the ICAO code for Ellinikon International Airport, a defunct airport in Athens, Greece
