= William Penn Patrick =

American entrepreneur, businessman and fraudster

- Born: March 31, 1930; Lees Mill Township, Washington County, North Carolina, United States
- Died: June 9, 1973 (aged 43); Clearlake Oaks, California, United States
- Occupation: Businessman
- Known for: Owner, Holiday Magic, Leadership Dynamics, Mind Dynamics
- Political party: Republican

William Penn Patrick (March 31, 1930 – June 9, 1973) was an American entrepreneur, businessman, and fraudster. He was the owner of Holiday Magic, Leadership Dynamics, and Mind Dynamics. Patrick was a proponent of the sour grapes philosophy, and has been widely quoted as stating: "Those who condemn wealth are those who have none and see no chance of getting it."

Patrick tried unsuccessfully to enter politics, first running against Ronald Reagan for the Republican nomination for governor of California, and was later nominated by the California Theocratic Party for Vice President of the United States. Patrick was a member of the John Birch Society.

In 1972 an F-86 Sabre jet, owned by Patrick, crashed into an ice cream parlor in Sacramento, killing 22 people on the ground. Patrick was not the pilot at that time, but a year later he died in a crash in his P-51D Mustang in Lakeport, California.

== Business career ==
After high school, Penn Patrick joined the Air Force. In the late 1950s, he enrolled in Sacramento State College and started teaching in a junior high school after earning a temporary teaching credential. He graduated in history and political science.

Patrick began his experience in sales selling products door-to-door in Illinois. In 1964, he bought the cosmetics company Zolene for $16,500. He renamed it Holiday Magic (located 616 Canal St. in San Rafael) and turned it into a million-dollar operation within the first year. The products were labelled natural and organic, a claim that was later dropped. The company was rapidly hit by lawsuits for false advertising about the content of its products.

He was the owner of companies including Leadership Dynamics, a controversial company which was the first form of Large Group Awareness Training, and Holiday Magic, a door-to-door cosmetics company later termed by the United States Federal government to be fraudulent. Mind Dynamics was initially founded by Alexander Everett, and Patrick backed the company before buying it.

The motivation techniques of Leadership Dynamics were criticized. Those included tying people to crosses or locking them in a closed coffin, all of which Penn Patrick did not deny. Some witnessed great physical distress during the training sessions. According to Ed Dieckmann Jr., the goal of those days-long sessions was to get pyramid victims to buy thousands of dollars worth of products for resale, and break them so they would unconditionally and permanently submit to the scam. The sales methods of Leadership Dynamics were applied in all the subsidiaries of the group.

His main holding, the Patrick Company, controlled Holiday Magic, Leadership Dynamics, Spectrum Air (company owning his planes), Alexander Taylor (clothing), StaPower (oil additive) and Bob Cummings, Inc. (vitamins). He opened an air museum to exhibit his planes, which included a B‐29, a Ford tri‐motor, a P‐51 Mustang, and an F‐86.

Patrick was a mentor of Glenn W. Turner, founder of the Dare-to-Be-Great motivational course and Koscot Interplanetary cosmetics.

== Political career ==
In November 1965, a year after making his first million dollars, Patrick entered politics, running against Ronald Reagan for the Republican nomination for the governorship of California, even though he positioned himself as an outsider, declaring "I will be a David fighting the political Goliaths of both parties" and attacking Reagan saying "The Republican Party must have something other than a parrot, that candidate is not a man".

In February 1966, the California pollster Mervin Field reported a 1% vote intention for Patrick. Patrick accused Field of taking a $16,000 bribe to slant the polls. Mervin Field sued Patrick for libel, for damages of US$4 million, and was awarded US$300,000.

Patrick finished in 4th place in the primary election with 1.87% of the vote and lost the nomination to Ronald Reagan. Patrick paid a total of $327,000 for his campaign and got 38,792 votes (against 1,385,550 for Reagan). The New Republic described Patrick's campaign strategy as that of "out-Reaganing Ronald Reagan". In 1967, Patrick formed a fundraising group to run for Thomas Kuchel's Senate seat. Patrick was later nominated for Vice President of the United States, in 1967, by the California Theocratic Party. The Los Angeles Times referred to Patrick as the "strangest politician". He was mainly popular among ultraconservative and ultra right political circles in California.

At a July 1967 Republican rally, he declared "I disagree with those who want to impeach Earl Warren, I think they should hang him."

== Complaints and lawsuits ==
Patrick's companies were later investigated by the Securities and Exchange Commission, on allegations of pyramid schemes and swindling $250 million from 80,000 distributors. Patrick reacted by calling those federal investigations a political coup. By 1973, many "Holiday Girls" (Holiday Magic sales reps) had filed lawsuits against Holiday Magic because they could not find buyers, yet the company was filing an annual revenue of $22 million. During the trial for fraud against Holiday Magic, one executive testified that 95% of the revenues came from wholesale to distributors, and not from actual B2C sales. According to the SEC, if Holiday Magic really had the manpower to sell its products door-to-door, 305,175,780 salesmen would be required to sell all the inventory stocked. A month after the charges were filed, Penn Patrick died in a plane crash.

Leadership Dynamics folded amidst lawsuits and allegations of physical and sexual abuse.

California Deputy Attorney General John Porter was quoted by the San Francisco Chronicle in 1977 saying "The guy who stole the most money in California was the late William Penn Patrick, he probably hurt more people than any other promoter in our history".

== Death ==
William Penn Patrick died on June 9, 1973, at age 43, in the crash of his privately owned P-51D Mustang near his farm at Clearlake Oaks, California. He was flying the plane at the time; after making a low pass, he pulled up steeply, stalled, and entered a spin from which he did not recover. Although he was a certified pilot, he had only 154 hours of flight time in the P-51D, and only about four hours over the preceding three months. He was flying with Christian George Hagert, 30, director of Holiday Magic of Helsinki, Finland, who also died in the crash.

After his death, his wife supposedly found a secret room in their mansion where $480,000 in cash was hidden. However, after the Holiday Magic trial, all of Patrick's assets were seized. Holiday Magic kept running, but the new President of the company had to get rid of at least 80 useless shell companies.
