= PSI Seminars =

American professional development company

- Company type: Private company
- Industry: Personal and Professional Development, Education
- Founded: 1973
- Founder: Thomas Willhite, Jane Willhite
- Headquarters: Jacksonville, Florida; United States
- Key people: Jane Willhite, President and Chairman
- Services: Personal development coursework
- Subsidiaries: PSI World
- Website: psiseminars.com
- Footnotes / references PSI stands for Personal Success Institute.

PSI Seminars is a private company that offers large-group awareness training (LGAT) seminars for professional and personal development. Programs are held in many locations in the U.S., Canada, Japan and worldwide. There are PSI Seminars offices in major cities throughout North America.

== History and background ==
PSI Seminars is the oldest continuously operating personal and professional training company in the U.S., with over 500,000 graduates of the Basic Seminar. Based in Clearlake Oaks, California, it was founded in 1973 by Thomas and Jane Willhite. They also founded the non-profit PSI World, based in Clearlake Oaks, which provides free training seminars, offers trainings to at-risk youth and organizes volunteer service projects such as building a new soccer field for an elementary school.

In 1983, Thomas Willhite died when his private plane crashed in a field at the company headquarters. Since that time his widow, Jane C. Willhite, has run the company as CEO.

The Unity Movement cited PSI Seminars as one of nine growth organizations that grew out of Mind Dynamics. Other groups also cited by Vahle as having been influenced by Mind Dynamics include The Forum and Lifespring. As such, PSI Seminars was an early example of the companies providing Large-group awareness training (LGATs) associated with humanistic psychology.

== Evaluations and reviews ==
Debra Holland, PhD, took the classes and then studied participants in the PSI Basic Seminar to determine the effects a year after taking the Basic class. Of 268 people who took the seminar, 202 people completed questionnaires before the seminar and 89 completed follow-up questionnaires or telephone interviews a year later. She found that:

PSI Basic graduates, regardless of prior expectations, described mostly positive experiences at the seminar. Even those responses which were subcategorized as neutral, described positive experiences although a negative comment was included. The majority of negative comments had to do with the pressure to attend advanced seminars or to enroll others into the Basic. Many graduates of the seminar made changes in their lives from attending the seminar, changes which continued throughout the following year. This finding may indicate that, although (as some critics have expressed) there was an initial "high" from the seminar, some permanent change was found for certain individuals. ... Individuals who are not dysfunctional, who are seeking enhanced relationships, better communications skills, and desiring to increase self-awareness could best benefit from attending PSI. ... It is important for the therapist to discourage those clients who have psychiatric disorders from attending any LGAT. ... A mostly positive experience [resulting from the PSI Basic] was found, with some types of changes occurring, mostly in the area of relationships.

PSI Seminars has been favorably cited by authors of books on self-improvement. Examples include Jack Canfield's The Success Principles, Chérie Carter-Scott's If Life Is a Game... These Are the Stories, Mark Chussil's Nice Start, and Rich Fettke's Extreme Success.

In an episode of Larry King Live, guests Michael Beckwith, author Bob Proctor, and John DeMartini announced that they would be working together for two weeks at PSI Seminars. Bob Proctor stated, "Dr. Martini, Michael Beckwith and myself, are going to [be] working together next week – is it two weeks – at PSI Seminars. I don't own the company, but it is the best course I've ever seen."

== See also ==
- Large-group awareness training
- List of large-group awareness training organizations
- LGAT Academic Analysis.
