= Sterling Institute of Relationship =

American for-profit corporation and counseling business

Sterling Institute Inc. (d.b.a. Sterling Institute of Relationship)
- Type: Privately Held Company
- Industry: Seminars
- Founded: 1979
- Founder: A. Justin Sterling
- Headquarters: Oakland, California
- Key people: A. Justin Sterling
- Owner: A. Justin Sterling
- Website: Corporate Web site

The Sterling Institute of Relationship is a for-profit corporation and counseling business run by A. Justin Sterling since 1979. Focusing on heterosexual relationships through intensive, multi-hour trainings, male and female participants attend separate trainings. The company is based in Oakland, California.

A. Justin Sterling is also founder and president of "International Community Service Day Foundation", also located in California.

== Coursework ==
MSNBC reported that The Sterling Institute has been described as "John [sic] Bly meets Est". The evolution from Erhard Seminars Training has also been noted in other media pieces. The MSNBC coverage was titled, "Naked VIPs, on videotape ...it has some past participants in a panic".

Originally titled "Women, Sex and Power," and "Men, Sex and Power," the corporate web site now refers to the seminars as "The Women's Weekend" and "The Men's Weekend". The main seminar is referred to by participants simply as "the Weekend," and was described in Details Magazine as exhibiting similar traits to "New Age quasi-spiritual movements."

Participants must sign a standard waiver before beginning the weekend. The waiver is presented to the participants upon registering for the weekend and paying the fees, and is also presented through a link on the registration page of the corporate Web site.

The main idea of the weekend is to teach men how to improve their relationships with women. In addition, participants are coached on being better friends, husbands, sons, fathers, and brothers, as the context of the weekend is simply; "being better men, being strong masculine men for the betterment of humanity. " men are "slaves to their egos," and thus women are "100 percent responsible for the success of their relationships," that a woman should "Never marry a man you don’t trust," and "If giving a man what he wants when he wants it requires you to be someone you’re not, or prevents you from accepting yourself, then he’s not the right man for you." Additional advice for women is detailed in Sterling's book, What Really Works with Men.

The course itself runs all weekend, with breaks in-between, according to a reporter from Elle Magazine. The many rituals that take place symbolize a "rite of passage" from youth to maturity, and is a triumphant time of male bonding. The weekend course typically ends in a "graduation ceremony", where the participants congratulate each other.

The Sacramento News and Review ran a story in 2019 titled, "Justin Sterling became a millionaire preaching sexist ideology."

== Publications ==
Sterling, A. Justin. [1992] What Really Works with Men, Warner Books. ISBN 978-0-446-36439-3.
