= Glenn W. Turner =

Multi-level market salesman and convict

Glenn Wesley Turner (1934–2020) was a salesman best known for his Orlando, Florida based multi-level marketing cosmetic company Koscot Interplanetary, Inc. Turner and Koscot became entangled in numerous legal difficulties and Koscot went out of business in the 1970s. In 1987 Turner was convicted on charges of conspiracy, fraud and operating a pyramid scheme, and sentenced to seven years in prison.

== Early life ==
Turner was a son of a sharecropper in a South Carolina tobacco farm and an unwed mother. He was born with a cleft palate and a cleft lip; surgery to correct them left a scar for which he was bullied until he dropped out of school in the eighth grade. Turner was described as semiliterate. During his adult life, he had a speech impediment. He served briefly in the U.S. Air Force before successfully graduating from a school for those who had dropped out of high school.

== Multi-level marketing ==
Turner started out selling sewing machines, and also worked briefly for Holiday Magic, a multi-level marketing company that sold home-care products and cosmetics, and through related companies sold self-improvement programs. In the late 1960s he became an entrepreneur, founding Glenn W. Turner Enterprises, Inc. By 1972 he owned an estimated 70 companies, including Dare to Be Great, a multi-level marketing company founded in 1969 which sold motivational and self-improvement courses. The combined number of Koscot and Dare To Be Great employees was estimated to be around 500,000.

What reportedly made Turner "really rich", however, was Koscot Interplanetary Inc. (Koscot stood for "Kosmetics for the Communities of Tomorrow"), founded on August 27, 1967. Koscot and Dare to be Great grew rapidly and Turner became famous. At one point 60,000 people in 40 states and Canada worked for his businesses. By the spring of 1969, Turner was living in a large home on Lake Maitland near Orlando, Florida, and "had eight Cadillacs and a Rolls-Royce, three Learjets and a closetful of tailor-made suits and alligator shoes". In 1972 he started but did not finish a "$3.5 million white stone castle with a helicopter landing pad" on Bear Gulley Lake, also near Orlando. He was featured in an 11-page article in Life magazine in 1971, and reportedly was worth $300 million at the time.

The premise of Koscot was that participants could sell mink oil-based cosmetics door-to-door or at parties. However, the focus of the company was more about selling distributorships than cosmetics. A distributorship was sold for $5,000. Participants also could pay $2,000 to be a supervisor or $5,400 to be a director. These levels (as in "multi-level marketing"), in theory, would make the participants money by recruiting others to work at levels below them as salespeople, supervisors or directors, paying commissions from orders of cosmetics to those at levels above who recruited them. They would then recruit their own participants to earn commissions for themselves. As one news story put it:

Think about it: One person could sell 10 distributorships, and each of the 10 could sell 10 more, and so on. The distributors could make thousands. The guy at the top could make millions. ... Turner had a talent for making people believe in him. His sales rallies became legend. ... At the meeting Turner's proteges would run to the stage in their flashy suits and fancy shoes, with $100 or even $1,000 bills pinned to their lapels. They drove new Cadillacs and wore alligator shoes. "And so can you," they would tell the crowd. "All you have to do is believe it."

Turner's "rags to riches" story was to be an inspiration for others to buy franchises so that "they could all be rich and successful like him".

He warned his would-be millionaires that nefarious elites conspired against their success and would try to talk them out of joining Koscot, telling a Houston Koscot meeting in January 1970:

"Everybody is trying to frighten the little people because this nation is controlled by 2 percent of the people ... They are jerking the strings and every time we get a little bit out of line, they start working on the leaders. They start trying to chip away at them. They start by lobbying up in Washington.

To form the pyramids of success, however, many directors, larger numbers of supervisors, salespeople and still more customers were needed.

... what would happen when these distributorships reached the saturation point, when there was no one left to buy a distributorship, and so many people selling cosmetics that it was impossible to recover the large investment from the small cosmetics commissions?

When some salespeople found customers in short supply, Turner encouraged them to "'fake it until you make it,' by wearing expensive clothes and waving around $100 bills to lure in others".

== Legal difficulties ==
=== Koscot ===
As pyramid schemes were illegal in most states, Koscot became involved in substantial litigation from government agencies and Koscot's customers. The first major lawsuit was filed in October 1969 by 14 Koscot distributors in Indiana, Kentucky, and Tennessee over Turner's failure "to pay promised dividends."

According to one report, Turner was the target of prosecutors "in more than 30 states". Disillusioned recruits testified against Turner or his companies, and one judge cited the phrase "fake it until you make it", as "evidence of malfeasance". In 1971, the Federal Trade Commission (FTC) filed a lawsuit against Koscot, charging restraint of trade. In August 1972, Turner was charged with "86 counts of sale of unregistered securities and failing to register as a dealer".

The Securities and Exchange Commission also filed a lawsuit in 1972 charging that Koscot's program should be considered a security and comply with securities laws and regulations. The FTC's decision on Koscot set a precedent for defining if a company is engaging in illegal pyramiding.

In 1973, a federal judge in Pittsburgh combined more than 1,000 lawsuits by unhappy Koscot investors and regulatory officials into "a single class-action lawsuit seeking more than $900 million." Turner's attorney, F. Lee Bailey, and eight others also were indicted by a federal grand jury on conspiracy and mail fraud charges. The indictment said that Bailey had appeared in a film made for Turner's organization and had appeared with Turner at several rallies. A nine-month trial ended in a hung jury. Charges then were dropped against Bailey. In 1975, Turner pleaded guilty to a single charge of violating securities laws and was given probation, avoiding prison but financially beaten, "his empire in ruins". After Koscot was sold in bankruptcy, the new owner found that it "had generated $169 million, still had assets of $11 million, but owed $33 million."

Turner ran in the Democratic primary for the 1974 U.S. Senate election in Florida, but lost. He also lost an election for state senate in 1978.

=== Challenge ===
In 1979, his fortune gone, he attempted a comeback with another motivational company called Challenge, Inc., which led to more legal difficulties. According to one report, Turner was convicted of running a pyramid scheme in Arizona in 1985 and released after five years in prison. Another reported him sentenced to seven years in prison in 1987, after being convicted, along with Edward Rector, on charges of conspiracy, fraud and operating a pyramid scheme. He told reporters as he was led away to jail: "The good that I have done outweighs the bad. A technicality of the law is what got me."

== Legacy ==
Turner died in his home in Lake Mary, Florida, in 2020. Columnist Helaine Olen noted that despite having been "all but omnipresent in American life", at the peak of his success, his death met with almost no media or public attention. Orlando Sentinel columnist Roger Roy wrote that, of the "untold number" of former Koscot and Dare to be Great believers, "most seem anxious to forget the Koscot heydays, and some seem embarrassed by their association with Turner".

Also commenting on his conspicuously quiet passing, Jim Ridolphi told of friends who spent their weekends "traveling the backroads of the Carolinas in a high energy house party" selling Turner's Challenge product:

"And, then as suddenly as it had started, it all ended and there was never another mention of the Challenge or Glenn Turner. ... To this day I've never heard one of them mention the Challenge or Glenn Turner. I can only assume it didn't end well for them."

However, while Turner's name is not well remembered, his techniques, Olen argues, has had great influence on American culture. His slogan "fake it until you make it", she states, came to express "the scrappy, optimistic mind-set of American hustle culture". She also draws a connection between Turner and 21st century figures such as Elizabeth Holmes, Sam Bankman-Fried, and George Santos.
