= Lifespring =

Defunct American for-profit organization

- Type: Privately held company
- Industry: Personal development
- Founded: 1974
- Founder: John Hanley Sr.
- Defunct: Mid-1990s
- Headquarters: United States
- Key people: John Hanley Sr.; Charles Ingrasci

Lifespring was an American for-profit human potential organization founded in 1974 by John Hanley Sr., Robert White, Randy Revell, and Charlene Afremow. The organization encountered significant controversy in the 1970s and '80s, with various academic articles characterizing Lifespring's training methods as "deceptive and indirect techniques of persuasion and control", and allegations that Lifespring was a cult that used coercive methods to prevent members from leaving. These allegations were highlighted in a 1987 article in The Washington Post as well as local television reporting in communities where Lifespring had a significant presence.

Before becoming defunct in the mid-1990s, Lifespring claimed that it had trained more than 400,000 people through its ten centers across the United States.

== Key people ==
Lifespring was founded by John Hanley Sr. along with Robert White, Randy Revell, and Charlene Afremow. By October 1987, Hanley owned 92.7 percent of the company. Prior to Lifespring, Hanley had worked for the multi-level marketing organization Holiday Magic. He and the other founders had also worked for Mind Dynamics with Werner Erhard, the founder of est, which became the basis for Landmark Education. Holiday Magic was founded by William Penn Patrick, co-owner and board member for Mind Dynamics. Holiday Magic later folded amidst investigations by authorities and accusations of being a pyramid scheme.

The Director for Corporate Affairs of Lifespring, Charles "Raz" Ingrasci, had also worked at est to promote a mission to the USSR and the Hunger Project. Ingrasci later became President of the Hoffman Institute, an organization founded in 1967 that is also part of the human potential movement and offers programs similar to those of Lifespring.

== Course overview ==
The Lifespring training generally involved a three-level program starting with a "basic" training, an "advanced" breakthrough course, and a three-month "leadership program" which taught the students how to implement what they learned from the training into their lives. "There is no hope" is a fundamental tenet in the course. The fundamental purpose of the leadership program was enrollment; the participants in the Leadership Program were essentially an unpaid salesforce with the sole mission of enrollment by any means. The trainers used high pressure and humiliation to force participants to achieve enrollment goals. This included yelling at the group as a whole at meetings, and singling individuals out and humiliating them in front of the whole group. Participants were told the city and the world were at stake and the only solution was enrolling as many people into the trainings as possible. Less than two percent found them to be "of no value". Graduates were often eager to share their own experiences in the training with family, friends, and co-workers, although they were precluded from sharing fellow trainees' experiences. There was never any compensation for assisting in enrolling others into the workshops. However, another, independent study found, "The merging, grandiosity, and identity confusion that has been encouraged and then exploited in the training in order to control participants is now used to tie them to Vitality (Lifespring) in the future by enrolling them in new trainings and enlisting them as recruiters."

The basic training was composed of successive sessions on Wednesday night, Thursday night, Friday night, Saturday day and night, Sunday day and night, a Tuesday night post-training session ten days after graduation, and a post-training interview. Evening sessions began at 6:30 pm and lasted until 11:30 or 12 or later. Saturday sessions started at 10 am and sometimes lasted until midnight. Sunday sessions started at 9 am and lasted until approximately 6 pm. The trainings were usually held in the convention facilities of large, easily accessible, moderate priced hotels (i.e., mid-town New York). A basic training was usually composed of 150–200 participants, while an advanced training was composed of 75-100 participants. Approximately 50 percent of advanced training graduates participated in the leadership program. Training also included alumni volunteers who served as small group leaders, several official staff, an assistant trainer, and a head trainer.

The training consisted of a series of lectures and experiential processes designed to show the participants a new manner of contending with life situations and concerns and how other possible explanations and interpretations may lead to different results. Some individuals complained that they felt harangued, embarrassed, or humiliated by the trainer during the training. A few individuals chose not to complete the training. Additionally, the trainer used many English words in a manner different from their usual meaning. "Commitment", for instance, was defined as "the willingness to do whatever it takes". "Conclusion" was defined as a belief. Also, words such as "responsibility", "space", "surrender", "experience", "trust", "consideration", "unreasonable", "righteous", "totally participate", "from your head", "openness", "letting go" were redefined or used so as to assign them a more specific meaning. "Stretch" was an activity that was outside the participant's comfort zone. During the advanced course the participants were sometimes sent out to perform certain tasks. If any participant did not complete their task the group was considered in "breakdown ".

The book Evaluating a Large Group Awareness Training made comparisons between Lifespring and Erhard Seminars Training (est).

Lifespring has been characterized as a form of "Large Group Awareness Training" in several sources.

== Lawsuits ==
In one case, an asthmatic was allegedly told that her asthma exacerbation was psychological and later died from the exacerbation. The lawsuit was settled for $450,000, and Lifespring admitted no wrongdoing. In another case, a man who could not swim was made to jump into a river and drowned. This case was also settled out of court. Many suits said the trainings placed participants under extreme psychological stress.

The Washington Post published an article about the company in 1987. It quotes Hanley as saying, "If a thousand people get benefit from the training, and one person is harmed, I'd can it. I have an absolute commitment for having this training work for every person who takes it." However, according to the Post, by 1987 Hanley and other Lifespring executives had known for more than a decade that some people were not suited for this level of personal inquiry. As evidence, the Post cited:

- Talk among top company officials about how to make the trainings less harsh while maintaining their effectiveness
- Dozens of reports submitted to Hanley in the late 1970s and early 1980s by Lifespring staff about participants who became panicky, confused, or nervous

Over time, the training company began qualifying students and required doctors' signatures for people who might require therapy rather than coaching.

== Criticism ==
The Post also reported in the same article that Hanley had been convicted of six counts of felony mail fraud in 1969, and was given a five-year suspended sentence.

In 1980, a federal judge rejected Hanley's request to have the felony conviction removed from his record. His request for a presidential pardon was also denied.

In 1990 KARE-TV (Channel 11, Minneapolis-St. Paul) ran a segment called "Mind Games?" that Lifespring said was deceptive and sensationalized.

One prominent critic of Lifespring is Ginni Thomas, wife of Supreme Court Justice Clarence Thomas. A congressional aide when she took the course, Mrs. Thomas said in an interview with the Post that she was troubled by exercises that involved stripping, sexual questions, and body shaming. After talking with a cult deprogrammer, she decided she needed to stop participating, but it took several months of work to overcome the "high-pressure tactics" to fully break with Lifespring. Afterwards, she received "constant phone calls" to pressure her to stay with the group, and ended up relocating to another part of the country to escape the calls.
