= Holiday Magic =

Former pyramid scheme

- Company type: For-profit
- Industry: Multi-level marketing
- Founded: October 14, 1964
- Founder: William Penn Patrick
- Defunct: 1974
- Headquarters: San Rafael, California, United States
- Key people: Roland R. Nocera, president, CEO
- Products: Cosmetics
- Owner: William Penn Patrick

Holiday Magic was a multi-level marketing organization, founded in 1964, by William Penn Patrick (1930–1973) in the United States. Originally the organization distributed goods such as home-care products and cosmetics. Company distributors were encouraged to recruit other distributors in a multilevel marketing structure, which was later characterized as a pyramid scheme.

On May 16, 1974, a compromise settlement with approximately 31,000 class members, establishing a trust fund worth $2,600,381, was approved by the court. The organization was dissolved in 1974, subsequent to the death of Patrick in 1973.

The company had been investigated by the Market Court of Sweden, United States Securities and Exchange Commission, the Federal Trade Commission, and the State of California.

== Organization ==
=== Origins ===
In 1964, after a bankruptcy and several business failures, Patrick (age 33) was walking by a garage in San Rafael, California, and noted that fruit-scented cosmetics were being sold. The company called Zolene was about to go out of business. Patrick bought all of the cosmetics supplies for $16,250, and founded Holiday Magic, Inc. After the purchase, Patrick began selling distributorships in his new company.

Patrick, a student of Alexander Everett (founder of Mind Dynamics), used Mind Dynamics techniques as well as the Silva Method in the Holiday Magic organization.

== Legal problems ==
The State of California filed suit against Holiday Magic in December 1972.

In February 1973, Holiday Magic was sued for calumny by Avon Products. In the lawsuit, Avon Products' claimed that "Holiday Magic employees distributed leaflets accusing Avon of goon squads, paying off The District attorney's office."

In June 1973, the United States Securities and Exchange Commission filed a lawsuit against Holiday Magic, charging Patrick with "bilking some 80,000 people out of more than $250 million through his Holiday Magic cosmetics and soap empire".

The company was investigated by the Federal Trade Commission, and in June 1973 the company was found guilty of deceptive trade practices. The FTC found that Holiday Magic was in violation of section 5 of the Federal Trade Commission Act, and section 2 (a) of the Clayton Antitrust Act.

In 1973, Holiday Magic's proceedings were prohibited by the Market Court of Sweden, and a fine of 2 million Swedish kronor was imposed.

=== Pyramid scheme ===
The company was termed as part of the "big three" scams, in a 1974 United States Senate hearing before the Consumers of the Committee on Commerce that dealt with pyramid sales. 1974 hearings before the Congressional Oversight panel of the Federal Trade Commission described Holiday Magic as a "Multi-level marketer of cosmetics", that used an "unfair and deceptive pyramid distribution scheme". Holiday Magic was also labeled a "pyramid scheme" and a "multi-level distributorship" by the United States Bureau of Domestic Commerce, in their 1976 published book: Crimes Against Business: A Management Perspective.

The company was cited by the United States House of Representatives in a 1975 hearing as an example of consumer fraud, again in 1977, and in 1991, in a hearing by the House Committee on Small Business. Katz's Everybody's Business: An Almanac also referred to Holiday Magic as a "pyramid sales organization". Turner described it as one of the first "pyramid marketing" companies in America. Clarke referred to the company as an "illegitimate" business. Tobias poked fun at the pyramid nature of the organization, in his book The Only Investment Guide You'll Ever Need, telling readers to be wary of "Holiday Magic - where the big money to be made was not in selling cosmetics, but in selling franchises to sell franchises (to sell franchises)" Howe wrote in the San Francisco Chronicle that Holiday Magic was "one of the largest of all pyramid schemes".

Holiday Magic is used as an example in graduate level criminal justice coursework to analyze the nature of corporate scams. According to the Duke Law Journal: "Illegality permeated every facet of the promotion of the Holiday Magic marketing program." One of the Holiday Magic Inc. cases was also cited by The University of Chicago Law Review and the Columbia Law Review. The Office of the State Attorney General in Maine, United States cites In re Holiday Magic, Inc., 84 F.T.C. 748 as an example of pyramid schemes. Faltinsky described Holiday Magic as "the largest pyramid scam of all time".

== Related companies ==
=== Leadership Dynamics ===
In 1967, William Penn Patrick wrote a booklet, entitled Happiness and Success through Principle, and founded Leadership Dynamics based on those principles. Holiday Magic distributors were invited, though not required, to attend the Leadership Dynamics Institute self-improvement sessions at a cost of $1000 each. Those in the positions of instructor general, trainer general, and senior general were required to take the training. Navarro described the training as having "overtones of strict military training techniques.

Ben Gay, a high-level instructor at Leadership Dynamics, was president of Holiday Magic in the United States. Though he claimed Leadership Dynamics was a separate company, "in no way related to Holiday Magic, Inc.", Gene Church pointed out many inconsistencies in this statement, in his book The Pit: A Group Encounter Defiled.

=== Mind Dynamics ===
William Penn Patrick bought Mind Dynamics in 1970. The Mind Dynamics course was described as providing "a means of achieving personal success through the conscious use of the subconscious mind". Distributors for Holiday Magic, who took the course, have considered it as a Holiday Magic Business expense.

=== Sales Dynamics ===
Sales Dynamics was another program of instruction for pay available to Holiday Magic Distributors to help them in their business activities.

== Ceased operations ==
In 1974, after almost 10 years in operation and tied to pyramid schemes and controversy, both Leadership Dynamics and Mind Dynamics ceased operations.

== Later information ==
CEO and President Roland R. Nocera pleaded guilty to securities fraud, in the case United States v. Nocera, et al. (unrelated to Holiday Magic). Larry Stephen Huff, another key individual in the company, served two years in a Federal Prison, for charges related to a Ponzi scam (unrelated to Holiday Magic).

Abe F. March held several executive positions for Holiday Magic and parent company U.S. Universal; Regional Vice President, Canada (1971–1972), Vice President, Greece (1972–1973) and Managing Director for Sta-Power, Germany (1973). He subsequently bought exclusive rights for Middle East distribution of Holiday Magic cosmetics and formed his own company, Beauty Magic, in Beirut, Lebanon. In 2006 he published a book (To Beirut and Back - An American in the Middle East) dealing, in part, with his experiences.

Glenn W. Turner worked briefly for Holiday Magic in 1966. He then started two multi-level marketing companies, Koscot Interplanetary, selling cosmetics, and Dare to Be Great, selling motivational and self-improvement courses.
