= Mind Dynamics =

Seminar company

- Company type: For-profit
- Industry: Self-help, Personal development, Large Group Awareness Training
- Founded: 1968
- Founder: Alexander Everett
- Defunct: 1973
- Headquarters: Texas, United States
- Key people: Alexander Everett; William Penn Patrick; Robert White, President; John Hanley, Field Director
- Parent: Leadership Dynamics

Mind Dynamics was a seminar company, founded by Alexander Everett in Texas in 1968. The company ceased operating in December 1973 after the death of co-owner William Penn Patrick and the resignation of President Robert White, alongside investigations for fraudulent representations and practicing medicine without a license.

== Techniques, methodology ==
Mind Dynamics has been compared to Dale Carnegie, and encounter groups. Mind Dynamics trained businessmen in personal development techniques, but relied on unique activities rather than academic theories. The coursework also utilized techniques that focused on visualization, and meditation.

Techniques drawn from the Unity Church included periods of silence, focusing the mind on positive elements, and distinguishing the "intuitive inner voice."

Some of Mind Dynamics' techniques were compared to self-hypnosis, and mind control. Mind Dynamics has been described as part of the consciousness transformation movement, and has been compared to Scientology, est, Psycho-Cybernetics, and Amway.

== Influences ==
Heelas' The New Age Movement states that Mind Dynamics and Alexander Everett were influenced by Edgar Cayce, Theosophy, and Silva Mind Control, and Curtiss' Depression is a Choice also cites Silva Mind Control and self-talk as the basis for Mind Dynamics. Mind Dynamics has also been described by several authors on religious texts as an offshoot of Silva Mind Control. According to Jose Silva, Alexander Everett was a graduate of Silva Mind Control. Everett also drew on principles from the Unity Church, Egyptology and Rosicrucianism in developing Mind Dynamics.

== Leadership Dynamics, Holiday Magic ==
Other companies which had corporate relationships with Mind Dynamics included Leadership Dynamics and Holiday Magic, both of which were founded by William Penn Patrick, co-owner and Board Member for Mind Dynamics. Holiday Magic later folded, amidst investigations by authorities and accusations of being a multi-level marketing pyramid scheme. Every employee in management positions at Holiday Magic was required to participate in the coursework.

== Investigated for fraud, practicing medicine without a license ==
In December 1972, Mind Dynamics was investigated for practicing medicine without a license, and fraudulent representation of the potential benefits of participating in their coursework. The company was also investigated by the state of California for making fraudulent claims. A lawsuit brought forth by the State of California in 1973 requested that Mind Dynamics be barred from what California referred to as its unlawful practice of medicine. William Penn Patrick was named as a party with Mind Dynamics in the lawsuit.

Mind Dynamics ceased operating in 1973, after being investigated and charged with fraud and practicing medicine without a license. According to an article in Forbes, as of 1974, the State of California was still seeking to enjoin the company from making fraudulent claims, and practicing medicine without a license.

== Later groups ==
Neal Vahle's The Unity Movement lists nine personal growth organizations which grew out of Mind Dynamics, including: est and The Forum, Landmark Education, Lifespring, Lifestream, LifeResults, LifeSuccess, Context Training / Context International, PSI Seminars, Personal Dynamics in Switzerland, Life Dynamics in Japan and Hong Kong, Alpha Seminars in Australia, Hoffman Quadrinity Process, Dimensional Mind Approach, Pathwork, and Actualizations. Vahle goes on to describe similar techniques used by these groups which were incorporated from Mind Dynamics' practices. Berger's Agit-Pop also gives examples of EST, Lifespring and Actualizations as groups that grew out of Mind Dynamics and helped form the human potential movement. The organizations cited above were founded by prior instructors from Mind Dynamics who had been trained by Alexander Everett, including Stewart Emery (who founded Actualizations), Randy Revell (who developed Context Training), James Quinn (who organized Lifestream/LifeResults/LifeSuccess), and Thomas Wilhite (who founded PSI Seminars).

Werner Erhard, subsequently associated with est (1971–1984), WE&A (1981–1991) and Landmark Education (founded 1991, known as Landmark Worldwide since 2013) taught in the Mind Dynamics organization, providing a link between Mind Dynamics and several subsequent large-group awareness trainings (LGATs).

Former MDI President Robert White founded Lifespring and ARC International which delivered the Life Dynamics seminars in Japan, Taiwan, Hong Kong and Sydney.
