= Erhard Seminars Training =

Organization founded by Werner Erhard in 1971

Erhard Seminars Training, Inc.
- Type: Privately-held corporation
- Founded: October 1971
- Defunct: 1984 (dissolution)
- Headquarters: San Francisco, California, United States
- Key people: Werner Erhard, founder

Erhard Seminars Training, Inc. (marketed as est, though often encountered as EST or Est) was an organization founded by Werner Erhard in 1971 that offered a two-weekend (6-day, 60-hour) course known officially as "The est Standard Training". The purpose of the training was to use concepts loosely based on Zen Buddhism for self-improvement. The seminar aimed to "transform one's ability to experience living so that the situations one had been trying to change or had been putting up with clear up just in the process of life itself".

Est seminars operated from late 1971 to late 1984 and spawned a number of books from 1976 to 2011. Est has been featured in a number of films and television shows, including the critically acclaimed spy series The Americans, broadcast from 2013 to 2018. Est represented an outgrowth of the Human Potential Movement of the 1960s through to the 1970s.

As est grew, so did criticisms. Various critics accused est of mind control or of forming an authoritarian army; some labeled it a cult.

The last est training took place in December 1984 in San Francisco. The seminars gave way to a "gentler" course offered by Werner Erhard and Associates and dubbed "The Forum" (currently named Landmark Worldwide), which began in January 1985.

== History ==
=== Early influences. 1960s through 1971 ===
In W. W. Bartley III's biography of Werner Erhard, Werner Erhard: The Transformation of a Man, the Founding of est (1978), Erhard describes his explorations of Zen Buddhism. Bartley quotes Erhard as acknowledging Zen as the essential contribution that "created the space [for est]".

Bartley details Erhard's connections with Zen beginning with his extensive studies with Alan Watts in the mid-1960s. Bartley quotes Erhard as acknowledging:

Of all the disciplines that I studied, practiced, learned, Zen was the essential one. It was not so much an influence on me, rather it created space. It allowed those things that were there to be there. It gave some form to my experience. And it built up in me the critical mass from which was kindled the experience that produced est.

Other influences included Dale Carnegie, Subud, Scientology and Mind Dynamics.

=== As est, 1971 to 1984 ===
In 1971, Werner Erhard reported having a personal transformation, and created the est training to allow others to have the same experience. The first est course was held at a Jack Tar Hotel in San Francisco, California, in October 1971. Within a year, trainings were being held in twelve major cities and had over 62,000 graduates.

Beginning in July 1974 the est training was delivered at the U.S. Penitentiary at Lompoc, California, with the approval of the Federal Bureau of Prisons. Initial est training in Lompoc involved participation of 12–15 federal prisoners and outside community members within the walls of the maximum security prison and was personally conducted by Werner Erhard. By 1979, est had expanded to Europe and other parts of the world, and in 1980 the first est training in Israel was offered in Tel Aviv. A few years later in 1983, the organization moved into a large facility built for the Marine Cooks and Stewards in Santa Rosa, California.

As est grew, so did criticism. It was accused of mind control and labeled a cult by some critics who said that it exploited its followers by recruiting and offering numerous "graduate seminars." In 1983 in the United States, a participant named Jack Slee collapsed during a part of the seminar known as "the danger process" and later died at the hospital. A court subsequently found that the est training was not the cause of death. A jury later ruled that Erhard and his company had been negligent, but did not give Slee's estate a monetary award. The United States Tax Court in 1986, upheld an Internal Revenue Service (IRS) claim that est owed the federal government more than $3.3 million in back taxes "because of sham transactions involving the movement's 'Body of Knowledge."

According to a 1991 report by the Los Angeles Times, est had been the target of a smear campaign by the Church of Scientology. This campaign had spanned several years, with examples being found in documents seized by the FBI in 1977. This smear campaign involved hiring personal investigators to spy on Erhard, recruiting Scientologists to covertly enroll in and disrupt est courses, and compiling information from disgruntled former est participants which could be used to discredit est. Scientology founder L. Ron Hubbard (who died in 1986) believed that Erhard had copied Scientology. Erhard disputed this, saying that est was essentially different despite some similarities.

In their 1992 book Perspectives on the New Age James R. Lewis and J. Gordon Melton said that similarities between est and Mind Dynamics were "striking", as both used "authoritarian trainers who enforce numerous rules," require applause after participants "share" in front of the group, and de-emphasize reason in favor of "feeling and action." The authors also described graduates of est as "fiercely loyal," and said that it recruited heavily, reducing marketing expenses to virtually zero.

=== As Landmark, 1985 to present ===
The last est training was held in December 1984 in San Francisco, after which it was replaced by a purportedly "gentler" course called "The Forum," which began in January 1985. "est, Inc." evolved into "est, an Educational Corporation," and eventually into Werner Erhard and Associates. In 1991 the business was sold to the employees who formed a new company called Landmark Education with Erhard's brother, Harry Rosenberg, becoming the CEO. Landmark Education was structured as a for-profit, employee-owned company; since 2013, it operates as Landmark Worldwide with a consulting division called Vanto Group. Some sociology and religious movement scholars have classified Landmark as well as its parent organization 'est' as a "new religious movement" (NRM).

== Practices ==
The est Standard Training program consisted of two weekend-long workshops with evening sessions on the intervening weekdays. Workshops generally involved about 200 participants and were initially led by Erhard and later by people trained by him. Ronald Heifetz, founder of the Center for Public Leadership at Harvard University, called est "an important experience in which two hundred people go through a powerful curriculum over two weekends and have a learning experience that seemed to change many of their lives." Trainers confronted participants one-on-one and challenged them to be themselves rather than to play a role that had been imposed on them by the past.

Jonathan D. Moreno observed that "participants might have been surprised how both physically and emotionally challenging and how philosophical the training was." He writes that the critical part of the training was freeing oneself from the past, which was accomplished by "experiencing" one's recurrent patterns and problems and choosing to change them. The word experience meant to bring into full awareness the repetition of old, burdensome behaviors. The seminar sought to enable participants to shift the state of mind around which their lives were organized, from attempts to get satisfaction or to survive, to actually being satisfied and experiencing themselves as whole and complete in the present moment.

=== Anecdotal results ===
Some participants reported experiencing powerful results through their participation in the est training, characterized by Eliezer Sobel as perceived "dramatic transformations in their relationships with their families, with their work and personal vision, or most important, with the recognition who they truly were in the core of their beings". One study of "a large sample of est alumni who had completed the training at least 3 months before revealed that "the large majority felt the experience had been positive (88%), and considered themselves better off for having taken the training (80%)". Other est participants described the sessions more negatively.

=== Controversy ===
In 1976 psychologist Dr. Daniel Fullman called est more of a money making scheme than a practical way to provide therapeutic help. Dr. Leonard Glass, a clinical professor of psychology at Harvard University, alleged in 1983 that participants of est showed "severe emotional problems, notably psychosis, which occurred in the midst of or shortly after EST training." A participant of an est seminar sued the organization in 1985 over negligence and fraud, and est has been accused of mind control and labeled a cult by critics who said that it exploited its followers by recruiting and offering numerous "graduate seminars."

In 1985, a group of psychology researchers studied participants of the Forum, which had just evolved from est and was classified as a Large Group Awareness Training course. These researchers compared their outcomes to a control group of non attendees. They published their results in the book Evaluating a Large Group Awareness Training. They found that while participants had a short-term increase in internal locus of control, or the belief that one can control their own life, no long-term positive or negative effects on the study participants' self-perception were detected.

=== In Popular Fiction ===
Erhard Seminars featured in TV & film:

- Semi-Tough (1977 film)
- Crystal Lake (2026 streaming series)
- The Americans (2013 TV series)

== Related organizations ==
- The Hunger Project
- Werner Erhard and Associates
- Landmark Worldwide

== See also ==
- Semi-Tough, a 1977 film which parodied the then-popular course
- EST and The Forum in popular culture
- Getting It: The Psychology of est
- Human Potential Movement
- Large-group awareness training
- List of large-group awareness training organizations
- Outrageous Betrayal
- Circle of Power (1981 film)
