= Landmark Worldwide =

American private for-profit organization

Landmark Worldwide LLC
- Type: Privately held company LLC
- Industry: Personal development
- Founded: January 16, 1991
- Headquarters: San Francisco, California
- Key people: Michael Leavitt (CEO)
- Products: The Landmark Forum associated coursework
- Revenue: $100 million (2016)
- Net income: $5 million (2016)
- Number of employees: 500 employees and 7,500 volunteers
- Subsidiaries: The Vanto Group; Tekniko Licensing Corporation
- Website: landmarkworldwide.com

Landmark Worldwide (previously as Landmark Education), is an American privately held company that offers for-profit personal development education.

Several sociologists and scholars of religion have classified Landmark as a "new religious movement" (NRM), while others have called it a "self-religion", a "corporate religion", a "religio-spiritual corporation", and a cult. Some religious experts dispute these claims. Landmark has been criticized for the stress it puts on participants while it tries to convert them to a new worldview and for its recruitment tactics: Landmark does not use advertising, but instead pressures participants during courses to recruit relatives and friends as new customers.

Its subsidiary, the Vanto Group, markets and delivers training and consulting to organizations.

== History ==
The Landmark Forum is created in 1985 by Werner Erhard after he renamed the Erhard Seminars Training (EST) to its current name. As the creator of the Human Potential Movement, Erhard has been working on the idea for the Forum since c. 1983, and the new Forum adopted a more business-oriented and less "aggressive" philosophy. The first forum events cost $525 per person and were $50 more expensive than est. Erhard also created a "Young People's Forum" for children ages 6 to 12 with same cost as an adult event.

In 1991, Erhard sold the intellectual property rights associated with the Forum's concepts to some of his employees, (including his brother Harry Rosenberg who became CEO) who incorporated into "Landmark Education Corporation". Landmark paid Erhard $3 million as an initial licensing fee, with additional payments over the next 18 years not to exceed $15 million. The new company offered similar courses and employed many of the same staff. The Forum was reduced in length from four days to three, and its price is about 50% of the cost of the est courses. It was still considered very challenging, lasting 39 hours for each forum. In 2001, Rosenberg stated that Landmark had completely purchased the licenses to all of Erhard's concepts and all divisions of the company.

In 2003, Landmark Education Corporation was re-structured into Landmark Education LLC, and in 2013 it was renamed Landmark Worldwide LLC. Landmark Worldwide states that it operates as a for-profit company, whose employees own all the shares of the corporation. The company states that it invests its surpluses "into making its programs, initiatives, and services more widely available."

The company reported in 2019 that more than 2.4 million people had participated in its programs since 1991. Landmark holds seminars in approximately 125 locations in more than 21 countries. Landmark's revenue surpassed $100 million in 2018, with profits of about $5 million. The organization has 500 employees, and about 7,500 volunteers, an unusually large number of volunteers for a for-profit company. Their use of volunteers prompted three separate investigations by the United States Department of Labor, which concluded without requiring Landmark to make any changes to their practices.

=== Business consulting ===
In 1993, Landmark started a subsidiary named Landmark Education Business Development (LEBD), which uses the Landmark methodology to provide consulting services to businesses and other organizations. LEBD became the Vanto Group in 2008.

=== Controversial marketing practices ===
Landmark does not use advertising to reach potential customers, but instead repeatedly pressures participants during their courses to recruit relatives, friends, and acquaintances as new clients. This complete reliance on word-of-mouth advertising to market its programs has been described by reporters variously as: "evangelical", having "a Ponzi taste", "a quasi-pyramid scheme", and including a "hard, hard sell".

=== Accusations of being a cult ===
Landmark has faced accusations of being a cult. Several commentators unrelated to Landmark have stated that because it has no single central leader, is a secular (non-religious) organization, and tries to unite (and re-unite) participants with their family and friends (rather than isolate them) that it does not meet many of the characteristics of a cult.

Landmark has threatened and pursued lawsuits against people who have called or labeled it such, including individuals (clinical psychology professor Margaret Singer), magazines (Elle, Self, and Now) and organizations (Cult Awareness Network). After Singer wrote a book, Cults in Our Midst, in which she mentioned Landmark as a controversial New Age training course, Landmark sued Singer. The suit was resolved when Singer agreed to provide a sworn statement that Landmark is not a cult or sect. Singer stated that she would not recommend the group to anyone, and would not comment on whether Landmark used coercive persuasion for fear of legal recrimination from Landmark. In 1997, Landmark sued Cult Awareness Network (CAN) after they made statements alleging or implying that Landmark was a cult. That suit was resolved when CAN stated that it has no evidence that Landmark is a cult.

In 2004, it was revealed that Landmark had paid French anti-cult expert Jean-Marie Abgrall to "audit" them. Landmark had been listed as a cult by the Parliamentary Commission on Cults in France 1995 list of cults; displeased by their designation, they contacted Abgrall to have them removed from the list. Abgrall wrote a report on the organization arguing that they were not a cult, arguing that they were a "harmless organization", though they did conclude by recognizing that the group may have had some warning signs. Following his report they were removed from the list, and Abgrall was paid €45,699.49 by Landmark from the period of 2001 to 2002. Abgrall complained in 2004 when interviewed by Le Parisien that this had only been revealed to block his involvement in the ongoing Order of the Solar Temple cult trial, and that he had no conflict of interest as he "wrote an unfavorable report and paid my taxes."

In June 2004, Landmark filed a 1 million dollar lawsuit against Rick Alan Ross's Cult Education Institute, alleging that postings on the institute's websites which characterized Landmark as a cultish organization that brainwashed their clients damaged Landmark's product. In December 2005, Landmark filed to dismiss its own lawsuit with prejudice, purportedly on the grounds of a material change in case law after the publication of an opinion in another case, Donato v. Moldow, regarding the Communications Decency Act of 1996, even though Ross wanted to continue the case in order to further investigate Landmark's educational materials and history of suing critics. Ross stated that he does not see Landmark as a cult because they have no individual leader, but he considers them harmful because subjects are harassed and intimidated, causing potentially unsafe levels of stress.

=== Other lawsuits ===
In 2004, a lawsuit was filed against Landmark, accusing the business of causing a psychotic episode in an individual after they attended a Landmark Seminar.

== Courses ==
Many large companies and government agencies have paid for and encouraged their employees to take Landmark's classes.

Andrew Cherng, the founder and co-CEO of Panda Express, has said that Landmark aided his company's success. He has strongly encouraged his employees and all managers to take Landmark's classes. Chip Wilson, the founder of Lululemon Athletica, is a follower of Landmark's principles, and has directed his companies to pay for employees to attend Landmark's classes.

Some of Landmark's courses require participants to start a community project.

=== Landmark Forum ===
Erhard promoted the idea that all events (good and bad) of an individual's life were of their own making, and that individuals would be empowered when they take personal responsibility for all events in their lives, an idea based in the Human Potential Movement. Many individuals liked this belief, whether or not it is true, or simply works as a placebo. The Landmark Forum's niche was for people who did not have major psychological problems, but were nonetheless seeking self-improvement and were not served by the medical psychological establishment.

The Landmark Forum takes place over three consecutive days with three long sessions. The Forum is attended in a group varying in size between 75 and 250 people. Landmark arranges the course as a dialogue in which the Forum leader presents a series of proposals and encourages participants to take the floor to relate how those ideas apply to their own individual lives. Course leaders set up rules at the beginning of the program and Landmark strongly encourages participants not to miss any part of the program. Attendees are also urged to be "coachable" (open minded to the course's concepts) and not just be observers during the course.

Various ideas are proposed for consideration and explored during the course. These include:

- There can be a big difference between the facts and events in a person's life and the meaning, interpretation, and significance the person gives to or makes up about those events. The course proposes that people frequently conflate facts with their own interpretations of what occurred and, as a result, create self-inflicted suffering and a loss of effectiveness in their lives.
- Meaning is a function of language, something people make up, rather than something intrinsic to life or occurrences. By articulating differently in a given context, people can alter the meaning they create and experience a greater degree of effectiveness in how they deal with events.
- In learning to perceive self-created meaning, people begin to see that assumptions they have made about who they are in life are actually shaped by limitations they have made up in response to past circumstances or events. This realization allows participants to articulate new meanings that are free of self-imposed constraints. The Forum goes on to train participants in actualizing these new possible meanings by sharing them with people in their lives. This creates a supportive social environment for achieving one's dreams and goals.
- The term "new possibilities" means something different from the common definition as something that may happen. Rather, the term refers to a here-and-now opportunity to be differently or take new action, free of constraints from the past.
- A person's behavior is often governed by a perceived need to look good and be right, and people are often unaware of how their behaviors are shaped by these needs.
- People have persistent complaints that are accompanied by unproductive fixed ways of being and acting,

During the course, participants are encouraged to call friends and family members with whom they feel they have unresolved tensions, and to take responsibility for their own behavior.

The evening session follows closely on the three consecutive days of the course and completes the Landmark Forum. During this final session, the participants share information about their results and bring guests to learn about the Forum.

A 2011 Time article stated that "Landmark has been criticized for delving into the traumas of largely unscreened participants without having mental-health professionals on hand."

== Reception ==
=== Scholars ===
Sociologist Eileen Barker and sociologist of religion James A. Beckford both classified Landmark and its predecessor organization est as a "new religious movement" (NRM). Some scholars have categorized Landmark or its predecessor organizations as a "self religion" or a (broadly defined) new religious movement (NRM). Others question some aspects of these characterizations.

Renee Lockwood, a sociology of religion researcher at The University of Sydney described Landmark as a "corporate religion" and a "religio-spiritual corporation" because of its emphasis on teaching techniques for improvement in personal and employee productivity, which is marketed to businesses as well as government agencies. Sociologist of religion Thomas Robbins says that Landmark could be considered an NRM. George Chryssides, a researcher on NRMs and cults said: "est and Landmark may have some of the attributes typically associated with religion, but it is doubtful whether they should be accorded full status as religious organizations."

Stephen A. Kent, professor of sociology and an expert in new religious movements, stated in 2014 that Landmark's business is "to teach people that the values they have held up until now have held them back; that indeed they need a new set of values and this group [Landmark] can provide those new sets of values ... I don't know of any academic research that verifies that kind of perspective" and while some individuals feel "cleansed" or "invigorated" by Landmark's training, others may feel violated by the pressure put on them to reveal their innermost secrets to strangers during Landmark's training sessions.

Landmark maintains that it is an educational foundation and denies being a religious movement.

==== Large Group Awareness Training study ====
In 1985, a group of psychology researchers studied participants of the Forum, (a Large Group Awareness Training course) and compared their outcomes to a control group of non attendees. They published their results in the book Evaluating a Large Group Awareness Training. They found that participants had a short-term increase in internal locus of control (the belief that one can control their life), but found no long-term positive or negative effects on individuals' self-perception.

=== Media ===
Time reporter Nathan Thornburgh, in his review of The Landmark Forum, said, "At its heart, the course was a withering series of scripted reality checks meant to show us how we have created nearly everything we see as a problem", and, "I benefited tremendously from the uncomfortable mirror the course had put in front of me."

Reporter Laura McClure with Mother Jones attended a three-and-a-half day forum, which she described as "My lost weekend with the trademark happy, bathroom-break hating, slightly spooky inheritors of est." Heidi Beedle, writing for the Colorado Springs Independent in 2019, said that "The tangible benefits of Landmark's courses may seem hard to pin down" though community projects do seem to be one, and, "One thing is certain: Landmark is a program that is incredibly successful at making people feel good about Landmark."

In 2004, the French channel France 3 aired a television documentary on Landmark in their investigative series Pièces à Conviction. The episode, called "Voyage Au Pays des Nouveaux Gourous" ("Journey to the land of the new gurus"), was highly critical of its subject. Shot in large part with a hidden camera, it showed attendance at a Landmark course and a visit to Landmark offices. In addition, the program included interviews with former course participants, anti-cultists, and commentators. Landmark left France following the airing of the episode and a subsequent site visit by labor inspectors that noted the activities of volunteers, and sued Jean-Pierre Brard in 2004 following his appearance in the documentary.

The episode was uploaded to a variety of websites, and in October 2006 Landmark issued subpoenas pursuant to the Digital Millennium Copyright Act to Google Video, YouTube, and the Internet Archive demanding details of the identity of the person(s) who had uploaded those copies. These organizations challenged the subpoenas and the Electronic Frontier Foundation (EFF) became involved, planning to file a motion to quash Landmark's DMCA subpoena to Google Video. Landmark eventually withdrew its subpoenas.

== In popular culture ==
In "The Plan", the third episode of the second season of the American drama television series Six Feet Under, est and The Forum are parodied.

== See also ==
- Applied Ontology
- List of large-group awareness training organizations
- Lifespring
- Mind Dynamics
- Sterling Management
