= Werner Erhard =

American author, lecturer

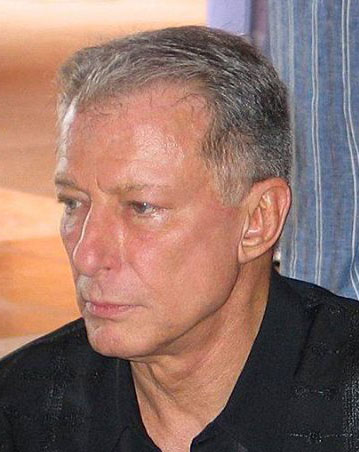
- Erhard in 2015
- Born: John Paul Rosenberg; September 5, 1935 (age 91); Philadelphia, Pennsylvania, U.S.
- Occupations: Author, lecturer
- Spouses: Patricia Fry (m. 1953; div. 1960) Ellen Erhard / June Bryde (m. 1960; div. 1983)
- Children: 7
- Website: wernererhard.net

Werner Hans Erhard (born John Paul Rosenberg; September 5, 1935) is an American author and lecturer who founded Erhard Seminars Training (est), a course of personal and social transformation, which was offered from 1971 to 1984. In 1985, Erhard replaced est with a newly designed and updated program called the Forum. Since 1991, the Forum has been kept up to date and offered by Landmark Education.

In 1977, Erhard, with the support of Donella Meadows, John Denver, Robert W. Fuller, and others, founded The Hunger Project, an NGO accredited by the United Nations in which more than four million people have participated with the goal of establishing "the end of hunger as an idea whose time has come".

In 1991, Erhard retired from business and sold his existing intellectual property to his employees, who then adopted the name Landmark Education, renamed Landmark Worldwide in 2013.

In the 1990s, Erhard lectured, taught programs, and consulted in the Soviet Union and then the Russian Federation, Japan, and Northern Ireland.

In 2004, Erhard partnered with Harvard Business School Professor Emeritus Michael C. Jensen in writing, lecturing, and teaching classes on integrity, leadership, and performance. Erhard's ideas have had an impact in academia and management and an influence on the culture at large.

== Personal life ==
John Paul Rosenberg was born in Philadelphia, Pennsylvania, on September 5, 1935. His father was a small-restaurant owner who left Judaism for a Baptist mission and then joined his wife in the Episcopalian denomination where she taught Sunday school. They agreed that their son should choose his religion when he was old enough. He chose to be baptized in the Episcopal Church, served for eight years as an acolyte and has remained an Episcopalian.

Rosenberg attended Norristown High School in Norristown, Pennsylvania, where he received the English award in his senior year. He graduated in June 1953, along with his future wife Patricia Fry, whom he married on September 26, 1953; they had four children.

In 1960, Rosenberg deserted his wife and their children in Philadelphia. He and his new wife, June Bryde, assumed false identities and traveled to Indianapolis. He chose the name "Werner Hans Erhard" from Esquire magazine articles he had read about West German economics minister Ludwig Erhard and physicist Werner Heisenberg. Bryde changed her name to Ellen Virginia Erhard. The Erhards moved to St. Louis, where Werner took a job as a car salesman.

Patricia Rosenberg and their four children initially relied on welfare and help from family and friends. After five years without contact, Patricia Rosenberg divorced Erhard for desertion and remarried.

In October 1972, a year after creating Erhard Seminars Training, Erhard contacted his first wife and family, arranged to provide support and college education for the children, and repaid Patricia's parents for their financial support. Between 1973 and 1975, members of his extended family took the est training, and Patricia and two of his siblings took jobs in the est organization.

== Career ==
=== Parents Magazine Cultural Institute ===
From the early mid-1950s until 1960, Rosenberg worked in various automobile dealerships, with a stint managing a medium-duty industrial equipment firm. In 1961, Erhard began selling correspondence courses in the Midwest. He then moved to Spokane, Washington, where he worked at Encyclopædia Britannica's "Great Books" program as an area training manager. In January 1962, he began working at Parents Magazine Cultural Institute, a division of W. R. Grace & Co. In the summer of 1962, he became territorial manager for California, Nevada, and Arizona, and moved to San Francisco, and in the spring of 1963 moved to Los Angeles. In January 1964, Parents transferred him to Arlington, Virginia as the southeast division manager, but after a dispute with the company's president, he returned to his previous position as west coast division manager in San Francisco. Over the next few years, Erhard brought on, as Parents staff, many people who later became important in est, including Elaine Cronin, Gonneke Spits, and Laurel Scheaf.

=== Influences ===
Erhard acknowledges many influences on his development, including a variety of experiences. He did not have much formal education and was self-educated. He became interested in physics in high school and later developed friendships with Nobel Laureates Richard Feynman and Murray Gell-Mann, from whom he gained knowledge of theoretical physics. Erhard also credits being tutored by philosophers Michel Foucault, Humberto Maturana, Karl Popper, and Hilary Putnam.

During his time in St. Louis in the 1960s, Erhard read two books that had a marked effect on him: Napoleon Hill's Think and Grow Rich (1937) and Maxwell Maltz's Psycho-Cybernetics (1960). When a member of his staff at Parents Magazine introduced him to the ideas of Abraham Maslow and Carl Rogers, both key figures in the Human Potential Movement, he became more interested in personal fulfillment than sales success.

After moving to Sausalito, he attended seminars by Alan Watts, a Western interpreter of Zen Buddhism, who introduced him to the distinction between mind and self; Erhard subsequently became close friends with Watts. Erhard also studied in Japan with Zen rōshi Yamada Mumon. In Bartley's biography, Werner Erhard: The Transformation of a Man, the Founding of est (1978), Bartley quotes Erhard as acknowledging Zen as an essential contribution that "created the space for" est.

Erhard attended the Dale Carnegie Course in 1967. He was sufficiently impressed by it to make his staff attend the course, and began to think about developing a course of his own. Over the following years, he investigated a wide range of movements, including Encounter, Transactional Analysis, Enlightenment Intensive, Subud and Scientology.

In 1970, Erhard became involved in Mind Dynamics and began teaching his own version of Mind Dynamics classes in San Francisco and Los Angeles. The directors of Mind Dynamics eventually invited him into their partnership, but Erhard rejected the offer, saying he would rather develop his own seminar program—est, the first program of which he conducted in October 1971. John Hanley, who later founded Lifespring, was also involved at this time. In their 1992 book Perspectives on the New Age, James R. Lewis and J. Gordon Melton write that Mind Dynamics, est, and LifeSpring have "striking" similarities, as all used "authoritarian trainers who enforce numerous rules," require applause from participants, and deemphasize reason in favor of emotion. The authors also describe graduates recruiting heavily on behalf of the companies, thereby eliminating marketing expenses.

In the early 1980s, shortly before the est training was phased out, Erhard was introduced to the work of philosopher Martin Heidegger. He consulted with the Heideggerian scholars Hubert Dreyfus and Michael E. Zimmerman, who noted commonalities between est training and elements of Heidegger's thought.

=== est (1971–1984) ===
Starting in 1971, est, short for Erhard Seminars Training and Latin for "it is", offered in-depth personal and professional development programs, the first of which was called "The est Training". The est Training's purpose was to transform the way one sees and makes sense of life so that the situations one had been trying to change or tolerating clear up in the process of living itself. The point was to leave participants free to be, while increasing their effectiveness and the quality of their lives. The est Training was experiential and transformational in nature.

The est Training was offered until 1984, when it was replaced by the Forum. As of 1984, 700,000 people had completed the est training. American ethicist, philosopher, and historian Jonathan D. Moreno has described the est training as "the most important cultural event after the human potential movement itself seemed exhausted" and a form of "Socratic interrogation". Erhard challenged participants to be themselves and live in the present instead of playing a role imposed on them by their past, and to move beyond their current points of view into a perspective from which they could observe their own positionality. The author Robert Hargrove said "you're going to notice that things do begin to clear up, just in the process of life itself".

The first est course was held in San Francisco, California, in October 1971. By the mid-1970s Erhard had trained 10 others to lead est courses. Between 1972 and 1974 est centers opened in Los Angeles, Aspen, Honolulu, and New York City.

=== Werner Erhard Foundation (1973–1991) ===
In the early 1970s, the est Foundation became the Werner Erhard Foundation, with the aim of "providing financial and organizational support to individuals and groups engaged in charitable and educational pursuits—research, communication, education, and scholarly endeavors in the fields of individual and social transformation and human well-being." The Foundation supported projects launched by people committed to altering what is possible for humanity, such as The Hunger Project, The Mastery Foundation, The Holiday Project, and the Youth at Risk Program, programs that continue to be active. It also organized presentations by scholars and humanitarians such as the Dalai Lama and Buckminster Fuller and hosted an annual conference in theoretical physics, a science in which Erhard was especially interested. The annual conference was designed to give physicists an opportunity to work with their colleagues on what they were developing before they published, and was attended by such physicists as Richard Feynman, Stephen Hawking, and Leonard Susskind.

=== The Hunger Project ===
In 1977, with the support of John Denver, Dana Meadows, and former Oberlin College president Robert W. Fuller, among others, Erhard founded The Hunger Project, a nonprofit NGO that holds consultative status with UNESCO. The project's origin can be seen in Erhard’s 1977 source document The End of Starvation: Creating an Idea Whose Time Has Come.

The Hunger Project was established as an international charitable organization with the aim of generating worldwide commitment to end hunger and starvation within 20 years. It emphasized the power of individuals to generate broad social change. Some critics described it as largely symbolic or as promoting Erhard's ideas rather than providing direct relief.

By 1979, about 750,000 people in dozens of countries had pledged their personal commitment to help end world hunger. By 1984, estimates placed participation at around 2.8 million people, and in 1985 The New York Times reported that the four-millionth person had signed the pledge declaring that the end of hunger "is an idea whose time has come".

=== Werner Erhard and Associates (1981–1991) and "The Forum" ===
In the 1980s, Erhard created a new program called the Forum, which began in January 1985. Also during that period he developed and presented a series of seminars, broadcast via satellite, that included interviews with contemporary thinkers in science, economics, sports, and the arts on topics such as creativity, performance, and money.

In October 1987, Erhard hosted a televised broadcast with sports coaches John Wooden, Red Auerbach, Timothy Gallwey, and George E. Allen to discuss principles of coaching across all disciplines. They sought to identify distinctions found in coaching regardless of the subject being coached. Jim Selman moderated the discussion and, in 1989, documented the outcome in the article "Coaching and the Art of Management."

=== Subsequent work ===
During the 1990s, Erhard lectured and led programs in various locations, including Russia, Japan, and Ireland. He had a three-year contract to give courses to Soviet managers that would allow Soviet officials to study his teaching methods. He consulted for both businesses and government agencies in Russia. In the early 1990s he conducted seminars in Japan for professionals coping with their financial crisis. In 1999, Erhard and Peter Block worked with a nonprofit organization for clergy and grassroots leaders to come up with new ways to deal with the peace process in Ireland.

Erhard and Michael C. Jensen, Professor of Business Administration emeritus, led seminars and training sessions at Harvard. They also explored the relationship between integrity and performance in a paper published at Harvard Business School.

Erhard and Jensen developed and led a course on leadership that took an experience-based, rather than knowledge-based, approach to leadership. Students were asked to master integrity and authenticity, among other principles, so that they could leave the class as leaders rather than merely learning about leadership. The course has been taught at several universities worldwide as well as at the United States Air Force Academy.

=== Landmark Education ===
In 1991, the group that later formed Landmark Education purchased Erhard's intellectual property. In 1998, Time magazine published an article about Landmark Education and its historical connection to Erhard. The article stated: "In 1991, before he left the U.S., Erhard sold the 'technology' behind his seminars to his employees, who formed a new company called the Landmark Education Corp., with Erhard's brother Harry Rosenberg at the helm." According to Landmark Education, its programs have as their basis ideas originally developed by Erhard, but Erhard has no financial interest, ownership, or management role in Landmark Education. In Stephanie Ney v. Landmark Education Corporation (1994), a court ruled that Landmark Education Corporation did not have successor-liability to Werner Erhard & Associates, the corporation whose assets it purchased.

According to Steven Pressman's 1993 book Outrageous Betrayal, Landmark Education agreed to pay Erhard a long-term licensing fee for the material used in the Forum and other courses: "Erhard stood to earn up to $15 million over the next 18 years." But Arthur Schreiber's declaration of May 3, 2005 states: "Landmark Education has never paid Erhard under the license agreements (he assigned his rights to others)."

In 2001, New York Magazine reported that Landmark Education CEO Harry Rosenberg said that the company had bought Erhard's license outright and his rights to the business in Japan and Mexico. From time to time, Erhard acts as a consultant to Landmark Education.

== Critics and disputes ==
Erhard became the object of popular fascination and criticism, with the media tending to portray him unfavorably for several decades. Moreno has written, "Allegations of all sorts of personal and financial wrongdoing were hurled at him, none of which were borne out and some [of which] were even publicly retracted by major media organizations." Various skeptics have questioned or criticized the validity of Erhard's work and his motivations. Psychiatrist Marc Galanter called Erhard "a man with no formal experience in mental health, self-help, or religious revivalism, but a background in retail sales". Michael E. Zimmerman, chair of the philosophy department at Tulane University, wrote "A Philosophical Assessment of the est Training", in which he calls Erhard "a kind of artist, a thinker, an inventor, who has big debts to others, borrowed from others, but then put the whole thing together in a way that no one else had ever done." Sacramento City College philosophy professor Robert Todd Carroll has called est a "hodge-podge of philosophical bits and pieces culled from the carcasses of existential philosophy, [and] motivational psychology." Social critic John Bassett MacCleary called Erhard "a former used-car salesman" and est "just another moneymaking scam." NYU psychology professor Paul Vitz called est "primarily a business" and said its "style of operation has been labeled as fascist."

In 1991, Erhard "vanished amid reports of tax fraud (which proved false and won him $200,000 from the IRS) and allegations of incest (which were later recanted)." The March 3, 1991, episode of 60 Minutes covered these allegations and was later removed by CBS due to factual inaccuracies. On March 3, 1992, Erhard sued CBS, San Jose Mercury News reporter John Hubner and approximately 20 other defendants for libel, defamation, slander, invasion of privacy, and conspiracy. On May 20, 1992, he filed for dismissal of his own case and sent each of the defendants $100 to cover their filing fees in the case. Erhard told Larry King in an interview that he dropped the suit after receiving legal advice telling him that in order to win it, he would have to prove not just that CBS knew the allegations were false but that CBS acted with malice. Erhard told King that his family members had since retracted their allegations, which according to Erhard had been made under pressure from the 60 Minutes producer.

Erhard's daughters have recanted the allegations they made against him. Celeste Erhard, one of the daughters featured on 60 Minutes, sued Hubner and the San Jose Mercury News for $2 million, accusing the newspaper of having "defrauded her and invaded her privacy", saying she had exaggerated information, been promised a $2 million book deal, and appeared on 60 Minutes to get publicity for the book. She said her quotations in the Mercury News article were deceitfully obtained. The case was dismissed in August 1993, with the judge ruling that the statute of limitations had expired and that Celeste "had suffered no monetary damages or physical harm and that she failed to present legal evidence that Hubner had deliberately misled her", which is legally required for damages.

CBS subsequently withdrew the video of the 60 Minutes program from the market. A disclaimer said, "this segment has been deleted at the request of CBS News for legal or copyright reasons".

In 1992, a court entered a default judgment of $380,000 against Erhard in absentia in a case alleging negligent injury. The appellate court stated that he had not been personally served and was not present at the trial.

In 1993, Erhard filed a wrongful disclosure lawsuit against the IRS, asserting that IRS agents had incorrectly and illegally revealed details of his tax returns to the media. In April 1991, IRS spokesmen were widely quoted alleging that "Erhard owed millions of dollars in back taxes, that he was transferring assets out of the country, and that the agency was suing Erhard", branding Erhard a "tax cheat". On April 15, the IRS was reported to have placed a lien of $6.7 million on Erhard's personal property. In his suit, Erhard stated that he had never refused to pay taxes that were lawfully due, and in September 1996 he won the suit. The IRS paid him $200,000 in damages. While admitting that the media reports quoting the IRS on Erhard's tax liabilities had been false, the IRS took no action to have the media correct those statements.

A private investigator quoted in the Los Angeles Times stated that, by October 1989, Scientology had collected five filing cabinets' worth of materials about Erhard, many from certain graduates of est who had joined Scientology, and that Scientology was clearly in the process of organizing a "media blitz" aimed at discrediting him. According to Erhard's brother Harry Rosenberg, "Werner made some very, very powerful enemies. They really got him."

== Impact ==
Erhard's programs have been said to have influenced millions of people's lives. He has been noted for his impact on broader cultural ideas and for introducing the modern concept of "transformation". Erhard is credited with coining or popularizing terms such as "taking a stand" and "making a difference".

Erhard's teaching methods have been characterized as engaging participants in strong and compassionate ways. Participants in his est training, a two-weekend seminar, reported experiencing significant personal changes that they perceived as valuable to their lives. Sixteen independent studies documented high rates of satisfaction among attendees of his seminars.

Organizations such as Microsoft and NASA used some of Erhard's later teachings in personal development programs designed to "optimize human capital". Management training programs and self-help books have also referenced his work.

Erhard has been described as an influential figure in the field of coaching. Many pioneers in coaching during the 1970s are reported to have participated in his programs or to have known him personally.

== Works ==
- Creating Leaders: An Ontological/Phenomenological Model with Michael C. Jensen, Chapter 16 in Handbook For Teaching Leadership: Knowing, Doing, and Being, edited by Scott A. Snook, Rakesh Khurana, and Nitin Nohria, Harvard Business School. SAGE Publications, 2012
- Four Ways of Being that Create the Foundations of A Great Personal Life, Great Leadership and A Great Organization with Michael C. Jensen, Jesse Isidor Straus Professor of Business Administration, emeritus Harvard Business School, 2013
- The Hunger Project Source Document, The End of Starvation: Creating an Idea Whose Time Has Come 1977
- Integrity: A Positive Model that Incorporates the Normative Phenomena of Morality, Ethics and Legality with Michael C. Jensen, and Steve Zaffron. Harvard Business School NOM Working Paper No. 06-11; Barbados Group Working Paper No. 06-03; Simon School Working Paper No. FR 08–05.
- Putting Integrity Into Finance: A Purely Positive Approach with Michael C. Jensen. Journal: Capitalism and Society, Issue 12, Volume 1, May 2017; National Bureau of Economic Research (NBER) #19986, March 2014;[82] European Corporate Governance Institute (ECGI) Finance Working Paper No. 417/2014; and Harvard Law School Forum on Corporate Governance and Financial Regulation.
- Hayek: A Collaborative Biography: Part 1 Influences from Mises to Bartley, Chapter 12: "Bill Bartley: An Extraordinary Biographer". Robert Leeson (ed.) Visiting Professor of Economics at Stanford University. Palgrave Macmillan. 2013.
- Werner Erhard on Transformation and Productivity – An Interview with Werner Erhard by Norman Bodek. Revision: The Journal of Consciousness and Change, Volume 7, Number 3. Winter 1984/Spring 1985.
- Being Well by Werner Erhard et al., Chapter 5 in Beyond Health and Normality: Explorations of Exceptional Psychological Well-Being, edited by Roger Walsh, M.B., PhD and Deane H. Shapiro, Jr. PhD. Van Nostrand. 1983.
- Some Aspects of the est Training and Transpersonal Psychology: A Conversation by Werner Erhard and James Fadiman. The Journal of Transpersonal Psychology, Volume 9, Number J. 1977.
- The Mind's Dedication to Survival by Werner Erhard, Gilbert Guerin and Robert Shaw. The Journal of Individual Psychology Volume 31, Number 1, May 1975.

== See also ==
- Large-group awareness training
