= Werner Erhard and Associates =

Self-help seminar company

- Company type: Private sole proprietorship(defunct)
- Industry: Personal development, Large Group Awareness Training
- Founded: February 1981
- Defunct: 1991
- Headquarters: San Francisco, California, USA
- Key people: Werner Erhard (Founder)
- Products: Seminars, workshops

Werner Erhard and Associates, also known as WE&A or as WEA, was a commercial personal development program which operated from 1984 until early 1991. It replaced Erhard Seminars Training. Initially WE&A marketed and staged est training (in the form of the est seminars and workshops), but in 1984 the est training was replaced by WE&A with a briefer, a less authoritarian and more marketable program based on Werner Erhard's teachings and called The Forum.

In 1991 Erhard sold the assets of WE&A to a group of employees, who later formed Landmark Education. Erhard then retired and left the United States.

== Timeline ==
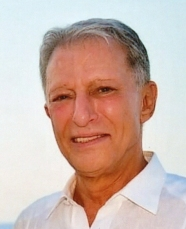
Werner Erhard

== The Forum ==
Evaluating a Large Group Awareness Training, a longitudinal study published by Springer in the series Recent Research in Psychology in 1990 concluded that attending the Forum had minimal lasting effects—positive or negative—on participants. The research won an American Psychological Association "National Psychological Consultants to Management Award" in 1989. The results of the research study appeared in two articles in the Journal of Consulting and Clinical Psychology in 1989 and in 1990.

Public-opinion analyst Daniel Yankelovich did an investigation of the response of participants to their experience of the Forum. Yankelovich reported that "more than seven out of ten participants found the Forum to be one of their life's most rewarding experiences". The study reported that 95 percent of Forum graduates believe the Forum had "specific, practical value" for many aspects of their lives, and 86 percent of those surveyed said that it helped them "cope with a particular challenge or problem".

== See also ==
- List of large-group awareness training organizations
