= Circle of Power =

1983 film by Bobby Roth

- Executives embracing after participating in "Executive Development Training"
- Directed by: Bobby Roth
- Written by: Beth Sullivan
- Based on: The Pit: A Group Encounter Defiled by: Gene Church; Conrad D. Carnes
- Produced by: Gary Mehlman; Anthony Quinn; Jeffrey White
- Starring: Yvette Mimieux; Christopher Allport; Cindy Pickett; John Considine; Walter Olkewicz; Scott Marlowe
- Cinematography: Affonso Beato
- Edited by: Gail Yasunaga
- Music by: Richard Markowitz
- Distributed by: Media Home Entertainment; Qui Productions; Televicine International
- Release date: 1981
- Running time: 98 minutes
- Country: United States
- Language: English

Circle of Power, also known as Mystique, Brainwash and The Naked Weekend, is a 1981 drama thriller film, co-produced by Gary Mehlman, Anthony Quinn and Jeffrey White, and based on the nonfiction book The Pit: A Group Encounter Defiled. It stars Yvette Mimieux in one of her final film performances.

== Plot ==
The hard-driven Bianca Ray is the chief executive of an international advertising corporation called "Mystique" who feels the gathered executive leadership is in decline. The organization is known for its effective and successful "Executive Development Training", or EDT. They are offered to take the training or face possible termination. The story highlights Jack and Lyn Nilsson, who are a decent all-American couple. As an aspiring young junior executive who is up for a promotion to vice-president, Jack concludes he and Lyn must take the training or he won’t be considered for advancement.

These executives (all men) and their wives are required to spend a weekend with Bianca and her training staff at a luxury resort where they are put under increasing psychological pressure. As a prerequisite to the training they all sign a waiver giving the company permission to physically and psychologically debase them for the duration of the course. The trainees are split into two groups by gender and are brutally forced to face their perceived shortcomings, such as obesity, alcoholism, closeted homosexuality, and cross-dressing. The mostly black hotel staff, familiar with the training, watch from the sidelines providing social commentary to each other.

The weekend starts out pleasantly as the participants play tennis, dance and socialize. The next day the men’s training begins when the white cane wielding Bianca, flanked by brawny assistants, explains the goal is “Designed to free them from themselves. . .and throw off the biological shackles that bind their lives”. She first selects obese administrator Buddy to enter “the pit”. She compels him to strip naked, accept a harsh paddling, enter a cage and be force-fed discarded food from the trash. Bianca guides him to an epiphany that causes him to understand the reason for his overeating. Next she calls out alcoholic Ben, saying he cares for nothing but drink and is already a deadman. She orders a coffin brought to the pit, has Ben sealed inside, then buried outside by the other men. His wife watches weeping as Ben screams and pounds on the coffin’s lid. Bianca orders him released. Ben says he saw himself as a deadman but now cares, exclaiming to Jack “It really works!”, thanks Bianca and hugs his coworkers in tearful gratitude.

The women’s group shows them being yelled at, slapped around (Lyn receives an especially heavy blow) and humiliated by trainer Jordan Carelli, who confronts and berates them for their failures as wives and mothers to “…relieve people of their hang-ups”. As the training proceeds, several seminar executives and their wives lose their inhibitions in the "consciousness-raising" coursework, and claim they have had a breakthrough. Back in the men’s group, Bianca accuses the accountant Ted of being a self-sacrificing martyr and coward with delusions of superiority, then orders him beaten by the other men and tied to a cross. This proves too much for Jack and he decides he cannot be a party to the violence and physical abuse.

Jack and Lyn decide to escape, but they are caught by Bianca and the other participants (many who sport bruises but are now enthusiastic acolytes) and taken to the room where Ted remains tied to a cross. Bianca accuses Jack of being a quitter, too distracted to stay at any one school or job for any meaningful length of time. Lyn is stripped to her underwear and restrained at one end of the room. Bianca will permit the couple to leave if Jack can successfully fight his way past all the others and get to Lyn. Jack succeeds and declares he feels incredible and successful as the others applaud while Lyn stands by dismayed. Bianca declares his future secure. But Jack then grabs Bianca, chokingly restrains her with the cane and declares the whole thing as a fraud that doesn’t work because no one has changed: Buddy is still gorging on sneaked food and Ben is still secretly drinking. Bianca allows the couple to leave along with Ted and his wife. After they are gone, Bianca announces that Jack has passed the training and is now a true leader.

== Cast ==
- Yvette Mimieux as Bianca Ray
- Christopher Allport as Jack Nilsson
- Cindy Pickett as Lyn Nilsson
- John Considine as Jordan Carelli
- Walter Olkewicz as Buddy Gordon
- Scott Marlowe as Ted Bartel
- Hugh Gillin as Ben Davis
- Leo Rossi as Chris Morris
- Carmen Argenziano as Tony Annese
- David Susskind as Himself

== Reception ==
The film won a Dramatic Films Award at the 1982 Sundance Film Festival (then called the U.S. Film Festival). Circle of Power played under the title Mystique at the 1981 Chicago International Film Festival.

A review in The New York Times described Circle of Power as an "attack on monolithic belief systems," and referred to it as "a worthwhile movie." Roger Ebert of the Chicago Sun-Times gave the film three out of four stars, writing that "...it's an entertaining film with serious intentions." Ebert compared it to events reported in Boston newspapers about a man who died during a seminar, commenting: "Art anticipates life." Ebert questioned the conceit of the film, asking the question: "Could a major corporation get away with this brainwashing?" The authors of the book upon which the film was based concluded their preface by stating: "And please remember as you read -- it's true."
