= Silva Method =

Self-help and meditation program

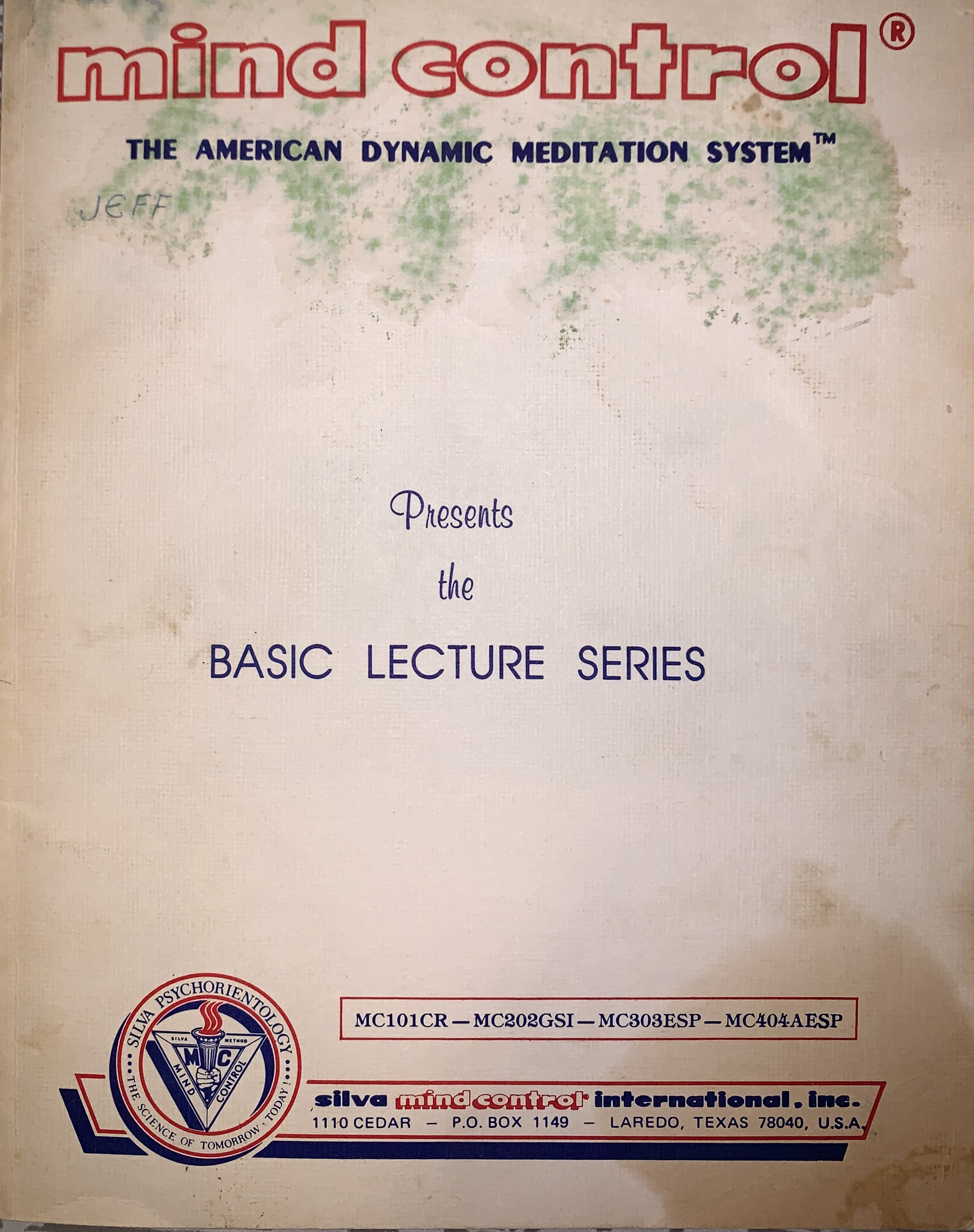

The Silva Method is a self-help and meditation program developed by José Silva. It claims to increase an individual's abilities through relaxation, improve the intelligence quotient, use the mind to heal the body, develop higher brain functions, and psychic abilities such as clairvoyance.

It has been variously classified as a self-religion, a new religious movement, and a cult, and has been criticised as pseudoscience.

== Biography of José Silva ==
José Silva (August 11, 1914- February 7, 1999), an American electronics repairman, grew up in Laredo, Texas. He developed an interest in psychology to see if it could help him increase his children's IQ. After experimenting and being convinced of his daughter's sudden clairvoyance, Silva decided to learn more about the development of psychic abilities.

In 1944 Silva began developing his method, formerly known as Silva Mind Control. He used it on his family members and friends before launching it commercially in the 1960s.

Silva was the subject of a 1990 biography.

== Technique ==
The technique aims to reach and sustain a state of mental functioning, called alpha state, where brainwave frequency is seven to fourteen Hz.^{:p19-20} Daydreaming and the transition to sleeping are alpha states.^{:p19-20}

Silva claimed to have developed a program that trained people to enter certain brain states of enhanced awareness. He also claimed to have developed several systematic mental processes to use while in these states allowing a person to mentally project with a specific intent. According to Silva, once the mind is projected, a person can allegedly view distant objects or locations and connect with higher intelligence for guidance. The information received by the projected mind is then said to be perceived as thoughts, images, feelings, smells, taste, and sound by the mind. The information obtained in this manner can be acted upon to solve problems.

== Skepticism ==
James Randi wrote of the Silva Method:

A system developed by José Silva (1914- ) that claims to develop improved memory, learning ability, and paranormal powers like telepathy. Much of the course consists of 'visiting' absent persons imagined by students and performing diagnoses on them. No tests of the validity of this practice have been done; such tests are discouraged by the teachers of the system.

== See also ==
- Autosuggestion
- Extra-sensory perception
- Visualization
- Remote viewing
- Samyama
- Self-help
