= Large-group awareness training =

Behaviour modification training carried out in large groups

Large-group awareness training (LGAT) is a type of personal development training claimed to increase self-awareness and facilitate constructive personal change. LGATs typically involve intensive group sessions, often lasting several consecutive days, with hundreds of participants led by facilitators.

LGATs emerged from the encounter group and human potential movements of the 1960s and 1970s and include commercial self-improvement programs such as Erhard Seminars Training (EST), Landmark Forum, and Lifespring. Academic research has reached mixed conclusions regarding their effectiveness and psychological effects: some studies have reported positive outcomes, while others have raised concerns about psychological stress, adverse reactions, and the methods used in some programs.

== Definitions of LGAT ==
In 2005 Rubinstein compared large-group awareness training to certain principles of cognitive therapy, such as the idea that people can change their lives by reinterpreting the way they view external circumstances.

In the 1997 collection of essays Consumer Research: Postcards from the edge, discussing behavioral and economic studies, the authors contrast the "enclosed locations" used in Large Group Awareness Trainings with the relatively open environment of a "variety store".

The Handbook of Group Psychotherapy (1994) characterised LGAT as focusing on "philosophical, psychological and ethical issues" relating "to personal effectiveness, decision-making, personal responsibility, and commitment."

Psychologist Dennis Coon's textbook, Psychology: A Journey, defines the LGAT as referring to programs claiming "to increase self-awareness and facilitate constructive personal change". Coon further defines Large Group Awareness Training in his book Introduction to Psychology. Coon and Mitterer emphasize the commercial nature of several LGAT organizations.

== The evolution of LGAT providers ==
Lou Kilzer, writing in The Rocky Mountain News, identified Leadership Dynamics (in operation 1967–1973) as "the first of the genre psychologists call 'large group awareness training'". Leadership Dynamics directly or indirectly influenced several permutations of large-group transformation trainings. Werner Erhard (successively associated with Erhard Seminars Training (est or EST), WE&A and Landmark Education) trained as an instructor with Mind Dynamics. Michael Langone notes that Erhard Seminars Training (est) became in the popular mind the archetype for LGATs.

While working for Holiday Magic, Lifespring founder John Hanley attended a course at Leadership Dynamics. Chris Mathe, at the time a PhD candidate in clinical psychology, wrote that most of the current commercial forms of Large Group Awareness Training as of 1999 were modeled after the Leadership Dynamics Institute.

== Academic analyses, studies ==
"Large Group Awareness Training", a 1982 peer-reviewed article published in Annual Review of Psychology, sought to summarize literature on the subject of LGATs and to examine their efficacy and their relationship with more standard psychology. This academic article describes and analyzes large group awareness training as influenced by the work of humanistic psychologists such as Carl Rogers, Abraham Maslow and Rollo May.

LGATs as commercial trainings took many techniques from encounter groups. They existed alongside but "outside the domains of academic psychology or psychiatry. Their measure of performance was consumer satisfaction and formal research was seldom pursued."

The article describes an est training, and discusses the literature on the testimony of est graduates. It notes minor changes on psychological tests after the training and mentions anecdotal reports of psychiatric casualties among est trainees. The article considers how est compares to more standard psychotherapy techniques such as behavior therapy, group and existential psychotherapy before concluding with a call for "objective and rigorous research" and stating that unknown variables might have accounted for some of the positive accounts. Psychologists advised borderline or psychotic patients not to participate.

Psychological factors cited by academics include emotional "flooding", catharsis, universality (identification with others), the instillation of hope, identification and what Sartre called "uncontested authorship".

In 1989 researchers from the University of Connecticut received the "National Consultants to Management Award" from the American Psychological Association for their study: Evaluating a Large Group Awareness Training.

Psychologist Chris Mathe has written in the interests of consumer-protection, encouraging potential attendees of LGATs to discuss such trainings with any current therapist or counselor, to examine the principles underlying the program, and to determine pre-screening methods, the training of facilitators, the full cost of the training and of any suggested follow-up care. One study noted the many difficulties in evaluating LGATs, from proponents' explicit rejection of certain study models to difficulty in establishing a rigorous control group. In some cases, organizations under study have partially funded research into themselves.

Not all professional researchers view LGATs favorably. Researchers such as psychologist Philip Cushman, for example, found that the program he studied "consists of a pre-meditated attack on the self". A 1983 study on Lifespring found that "although participants often experience a heightened sense of well-being as a consequence of the training, the phenomenon is essentially pathological", meaning that, in the program studied, "the training systematically undermines ego functioning and promotes regression to the extent that reality testing is significantly impaired". Lieberman's 1987 study, funded partially by Lifespring, noted that 5 out of a sample of 289 participants experienced "stress reactions" including one "transitory psychotic episode". He commented: "Whether [these five] would have experienced such stress under other conditions cannot be answered. The clinical evidence, however, is that the reactions were directly attributable to the large group awareness training."

In 2003 the Vatican reported its study results about New Age training courses:

New Age training courses (what used to be known as "Erhard seminar trainings" [EST] etc.) marry counter-cultural values with the mainstream need to succeed, inner satisfaction with outer success ...

— A Christian reflection on the New Age

In Coon's psychology textbook (Introduction to Psychology) the author references many other studies, which postulate that many of the "claimed benefits" of Large Group Awareness Training actually take the form of "a kind of therapy placebo effect".

Jarvis described Large Group Awareness Training as "educationally dubious" in the 2002 book The Theory & Practice of Teaching.

Tapper mentions that "some [unspecified] large group-awareness training and psychotherapy groups" exemplify non-religious "cults". Benjamin criticizes LGAT groups for their high prices and spiritual subtleties.

== LGAT techniques ==
Specific techniques used in some Large Group Awareness Trainings may include:

- meditation
- biofeedback
- jargon
- self-hypnosis
- relaxation techniques
- visualization
- neuro-linguistic programming
- yoga

LGATs utilize such techniques during long sessions, sometimes called "marathon" sessions. Paglia describes "EST's Large Group Awareness Training": "Marathon, eight-hour sessions, in which [participants] were confined and harassed, supposedly led to the breakdown of conventional ego, after which they were in effect born again."

Finkelstein's 1982 article provides a detailed description of the structure and techniques of an Erhard Seminars Training event—techniques similar to those used in some group therapy and encounter groups. The academic textbook, Handbook of Group Psychotherapy regards Large Group Awareness Training organisations as "less open to leader differences", because they follow a "detailed written plan" that does not vary from one training to the next.

In his book Life 102, LGAT participant and former trainer Peter McWilliams describes the basic technique of marathon trainings as pressure/release and asserts that advertising uses pressure/release "all the time", as do "good cop/bad cop" police-interrogations and revival meetings. By spending approximately half the time making a person feel bad and then suddenly reversing the feeling through effusive praise, the programs cause participants to experience a stress-reaction and an "endorphin high". McWilliams gives examples of various LGAT activities called processes with names such as "love bomb", "lifeboat", "cocktail party" and "cradling", which take place over many hours and days, physically exhausting the participants to make them more susceptible to the trainer's message, whether in the participants' best interests or not.

Although extremely critical of some LGATs, McWilliams found positive value in others, asserting that they varied not in technique but in the application of technique.

== LGATs and the anti-cult movement ==
After commissioning a report in 1983 by the APA Task Force on Deceptive and Indirect Methods of Persuasion and Control (DIMPAC) chaired by anti-cult psychologist Margaret Singer, the American Psychological Association (APA) subsequently rejected and strongly criticised the 1986 DIMPAC report, which included large group awareness trainings as one example of what it called "coercive persuasion". In 1997 the APA characterized Singer's hypotheses as "uninformed speculations based on skewed data". It stated in 1987 that the report generally lacked "the scientific rigor and evenhanded critical approach necessary for APA imprimatur." The APA also stated that "the specific methods by which Drs. Singer and Benson have arrived at their conclusions have also been rejected by all serious scholars in the field." Singer sued the APA, and lost on June 17, 1994. Despite the APA rejection of her task-force's report, Singer remained in good standing among psychology researchers. Singer reworked much of the DIMPAC report material into the book Cults in Our Midst (1995, second edition: 2003), which she co-authored with Janja Lalich.

Singer and Lalich state that "large group awareness trainings" tend to last at least four days and usually five. Their book mentions Erhard Seminars Training ("est") and similar undertakings, such as the Landmark Forum, Lifespring, Actualizations, MSIA/Insight and PSI Seminars.

In Cults in our Midst, Singer differentiated between the usage of the terms cult and Large Group Awareness Training, while pointing out some commonalities. Elsewhere she groups the two phenomena together, in that they both use a shared set of thought-reform techniques.

== See also ==
- Brainwashing
- Multi-level marketing
- List of large-group awareness training organizations
- Group dynamics
- Crowd psychology
