= Friedrich Hayek bibliography =

This is the chronological list of books by the Austrian school economist and philosopher Friedrich Hayek. The dates in brackets are the original year of publication of the book (not always in English).

The University of Chicago Press has a project called the Collected Works of F.A. Hayek, a planned series of 19 newly edited editions of Hayek's books with interviews with the author, new editions of his articles and letters, and hitherto unpublished manuscripts.

== Books ==
- Geldtheorie und Konjunkturtheorie. Beiträge zur Konjunkturforschung. Vienna und Leipzig: Hölder-Pichler-Tempsky. 1929. Monetary Theory and the Trade Cycle (PDF). Translated by Kaldor, Nicholas; H. M. Croome. London: Cape. 1933., reprinted New York: Kelley, 1966.
- Prices and Production (1931) , with a preface ("Hayek's Legacy") to the 2008 edition by Danny Quah
- Monetary Nationalism and International Stability (1937)
- Profits, Interest and Investment (1939)
- The Pure Theory of Capital (1941) ISBN 978-0-226-32099-1 Available online.
- The Road to Serfdom (1944) ISBN 978-0-226-32055-7 Available online.
- Individualism and Economic Order (1948) ISBN 978-0-226-32093-9 Available online.
- John Stuart Mill and Harriet Taylor: Their Friendship and Subsequent Marriage (1951) ISBN 978-0-678-06504-4
- The Counter-Revolution of Science: Studies on the Abuse of Reason (1952) ISBN 978-0-913966-67-9
- The Sensory Order: An Inquiry into the Foundations of Theoretical Psychology (1952) ISBN 978-0-226-32094-6
- The Political Ideal of the Rule of Law (1955)
- The Constitution of Liberty (1960) ISBN 978-0-226-32084-7
- Studies in Philosophy, Politics and Economics (1967) ISBN 978-0-226-32085-4
- Freiburger Studien: Gesammelte Aufsatze (1969) ISBN 978-3-16-146312-9
- Law, Legislation and Liberty: A New Statement of the Liberal Principles of Justice and Political Economy
  - The book is published in three volumes:
    1. Volume I. Rules and Order (1973) ISBN 978-0-226-32086-1
    2. Volume II. The Mirage of Social Justice (1976) ISBN 978-0-226-32083-0
    3. Volume III. The Political Order of a Free People (1979) ISBN 978-0-226-32090-8
- New Studies in Philosophy, Politics, Economics and the History of Ideas (1978) ISBN 978-0-226-32069-4
- Money, Capital and Fluctuations: Early Essays (1984)
- The Fatal Conceit: The Errors of Socialism (1988) ISBN 978-0-226-32066-3

== Pamphlets ==
- Das Miteterschutzproblem, Nationalékonomische Betrachtungen (1929)
- Freedom and the Economic System (1939)
- The Case of the Tyrol (1944)
- Report on the Changes in the Cost of Living in Gibraltar 1939–1944 and on Wages and Salaries (1945)
- The Road to Serfdom (1945): condensation from the book (1944)
- Individualism: True and False (1945): reprinted in Individualism and Economic Order (1948)
- Two Essays on Free Enterprise (1962)
- Wirtschaft, Wissenschaft und Politik. Freiburger Universitatsreden (1963): "The Economy, Science and Politics" is published in Studies in Philosophy, Politics and Economics (1967)
- Was der Goldwahrung geschehen ist. Ein Bericht aus dem Jabre 1932 mit zwei Erganzungen (1965)
- The Confusion of Language in Political Thought, with Some Suggestions for Remedying It (1968): republished in Freiburger Studien: Gesammelte Aufsatze (1969) and New Studies in Philosophy, Politics, Economics and the History of Ideas (1978)
- Der Wettbewerb als Entdeckungsverfabren (1968): republished in Freiburger Studien: Gesammelte Aufsatze (1969) and, "Competition as a Discovery Procedure" is republished in New Studies in Philosophy, Politics, Economics and the History of Ideas (1978)
- Die Irrtumer des Konstruktivismus und die Grundlagen legitimer Kritik gesellschaftlicher Gebilde (1970): "The Errors of Constructivism" is published in New Studies in Philosophy, Politics, Economics and the History of Ideas (1978)
- A Tiger by the Tail : The Keynesian Legacy of Inflation (1972, revised edition 1978). Issued in 1979 as "Cato Paper No. 6" by the Cato Institute
- Die Theorie Komplexer Phänomene (1972): "The Theory of Complex Phenomena" is published in Studies in Philosophy, Politics and Economics (1967)
- Economic Freedom and Representative Government (1973): republished in New Studies in Philosophy, Politics, Economics and the History of Ideas (1978)
- Full Employment at Any Price? (1975/1978): reprinted as Unemployment and Monetary Policy
- Choice in Currency. A Way to Stop Inflation (1976/1977): republished in New Studies in Philosophy, Politics, Economics and the History of Ideas (1978)
- Drei Vorlesungen tiber Demokratie, Gerechtigkeit und Sozialtsmus (1977)
- Historia y Politica (1977): See Essay "History and Politics"
- The Denationalisation of Money: An Analysis of the Theory and Practice of Concurrent Currencies (1976)
  - Revised as: Denationalisation of Money – The Argument Refined. An Analysis of the Theory and Practice of Concurrent Currencies (1978)
- The Reactionary Character of the Socialist Conception, Remarks by F. A. Hayek (1978)
- Economic Progress in an Open Society (1978)
- The Three Sources of Human Values (1978): republished in the Epilogue to Law, Legislation and Liberty, vol. III (1979)
- Social Justice, Socialism and Democracy: Three Australian Lectures (1979)
- Wissenschaft und Sozialismus (1979)
- Liberalismus (1979): translation into German of article in New Studies in Philosophy, Politics, Economics and the History of Ideas (1978)
- A Conversation with Friedrich A, Hayek (1979)
- 1980s Unemployment and the Unions (1980) ISBN 978-0-255-36173-6
- Evolution und Spontane Ordnung (1983)
- Knowledge, Evolution, and Society. London: Adam Smith Institute. 1983 – via Internet Archive.
- Our Moral Heritage (1983)
- Der Strom der Guter und Letstungen. 1984. doi:10.1628/978-3-16-165691-0.: "The Flow of Goods and Production"

== Books edited ==
- Beiträge zur Geldtheorie (1933)
- Capitalism and the Historians (1954) ISBN 978-0226320724

== Articles ==
- "Beiträge zur Theorie der Entwicklung des Bewusstseins" (1920)
- "Germany’s Finances", Letter, New York Times (Sunday, 19 August 1923)
- "Das Stabilisierungsproblem in Goldwährungsländern", Zeitschrift fur Volkswirtschaft und Sozialpolitik, n.s. 4(Vienna 1924)
- "Diskontpolitik und Warenpreise" (1924)
- "Die Währungspolitik der Vereinigten Staaten seit der Uberwindung der Krise von 1920" (1925)
- "Das amerikanische Bankwesen seit der Reform von 1914" (1925)
- "Review of Grenznutzen und Wirtschaftsrechnung by Leo Schonfeld (1925): Translated as "Marginal Utility and Economic Calculation: A Review", in Roy McCloughry (ed.), Money, Capital and Fluctuations: Early Essays (1984)
- "Der Ausbau der Wiener Stadtbahn" (1926)
- "Von gestern auf heute: Professor Dr Friedrich Wieser zu seinem. 75. Geburtstag" (1926)
- "Aus der Geschäftstätigkeit der Kammer für Handel, Gewerbe und Industrie" (1926)
- "Bemerkungen zum Zurechnungsproblem" (1926): "Some Remarks on the Problem of Imputation" in Roy McCloughry (ed.), Money, Capital and Fluctuations: Early Essays (1984), "Some Observations On the Imputation Problem" in Lawrence H. White (ed.), Capital and Interest (2015)
- "Friedrich Freiherr von Wieser" (1926)
- "Zur Problemstellung der Zinstheorie" (1927): "On the Problem of the Theory of Interest" in Roy McCloughry (ed.), Money, Capital and Fluctuations: Early Essays (1984), "On the Problem of Interest Theory" in Lawrence H. White (ed.), Capital and Interest (2015)
- "Einige Bemerkungen iiber das Geldtheorie zur Konjunkturtheorie" (1928)
- "Das intertemporale Gleichgewichtssystem der Preise und die Bewegungen des "Geldwertes"" (1928): "Intertemporal Price Equilibrium and Movements in the Value of Money" in Roy McCloughry (ed.), Money, Capital and Fluctuations: Early Essays (1984)
- "Review of Hans Neisser, Der Tauschwert des Geld" (1929): "The Exchange Value of Money" in Roy McCloughry (ed.), Money, Capital and Fluctuations: Early Essays (1984)
- "Gibt es einen "Widersinn des Sparens"? Eine Kritik der Krisentheorie von W., T. Foster und W., Catchings mit einigen Bemerkungen zur Lehre von den Beziehungen zwischen Geld und Kapital." (1929): "The Paradox of Saving", Economica 11, no. 32 (May 1931)
- "Reflections on the Pure Theory of Money of Mr. J. M. Keynes", Economica 11, no. 33 (August 1931 – Part I)
- "The Pure Theory of Money: A Rejoinder to Mr. Keynes", Economica 11, no. 34 (November 1931)
- "England and the Gold Standard": A letter written to The Times of London on 25 November 1931
- "Reflections on the Pure Theory of Money of Mr. J. M. Keynes (continued)", Economica 12, no. 35 (February 1932 – Part II)
- "Review of R. G. Hawtrey, Trade Depression and the Way Out" In Economica 12, no. 35 (February 1932)
- "Das Schicksal der Goldwahrung" (1932): "The Fate of the Gold Standard" in Roy McCloughry (ed.), Money, Capital and Fluctuations: Early Essays (1984)
- "Foreign Exchange Restrictions", The Economist (4 June 1932)
- "Money and Capital: A Reply to Mr. Sraffa", Economic Journal 42 (June 1932)
- "Kapitalaufzehrung" (1932): "Capital Consumption" in Roy McCloughry (ed.), Money, Capital and Fluctuations: Early Essays (1984)
- "A Note on the Development of the Doctrine of "Forced Saving"", Quarterly Journal of Economics 47 (November 1932)
- "The Trend of Economic Thinking", Economica 13 (May 1933)
- "Saving", Encyclopaedia of the Social Sciences. New York: Macmillan, 1934
- "On the Relationship between Investment and Ouput", Economic Journal 44 (1934)
- "The Maintenance of Capital", Economica n.s, 2, no. 7 (1935)
- "A Regulated Gold Standard", The Economist (11 May 1935)
- "Technischer Fortschritt und Überkapazität" (1936): "Technical Progress and Excess Capacity" in Roy McCloughry (ed.), Money, Capital and Fluctuations: Early Essays (1984)
- "The Mythology of Capital", Quarterly Journal of Economics 50 (1936)
- "Utility Analysis and Interest", Economic Journal 46, no. 181 (1936)
- "A "Scientific" Civilisation: The Webbs on Soviet Communism", The Sunday Times (5 January 1936)
- "Economics and Knowledge", Economica n.s. 4, no. 13 (February 1937): republished in Individualism and Economic Order (1948)
- "Das Goldproblem", Österreichische Zeitschrift fiir Bankwesen 2 (1937): "The Gold Problem" in Stephen Kresge (ed.), Good money. Part I, The new world (1999)
- "Investment that Raises the Demand for Capital", Review of Economic Statistics 19 (November 1937)
- "The Economic Conditions of Interstate Federation", New Commonwealth Quarterly 5, no. 2 (September 1939): republished in Individualism and Economic Order (1948)
- "The Counter-Revolution of Science", Parts I-III, Economica n.s. 8 (February–August 1941): republished in The Counter-Revolution of Science (1952)
- "Planning, Science and Freedom", Nature 148 (15 November 1941)
- "The Ricardo Effect" Economica n.s. 9, no. 34 (May 1942): republished in Individualism and Economic Order (1948)
- "Scientism and the Study of Society" Part I: Economica n.s. 9, no. 35 (August 1942): 267–91; Part II: Economica n.s. 10, no. 37 (February 1943): 34–63; Part III: Economica n.s. 11, no. 41 (February 1944): 27–39.: republished in The Counter-Revolution of Science (1952)
- "A Commodity Reserve Currency" Economic Journal 53, no. 210 (June–Sept. 1943): republished in Individualism and Economic Order (1948)
- "J. S. Mill's Correspondence", The Times Literary Supplement (13 February 1943)
- "The Facts of the Social Sciences", Ethics 54, no. 1 (October 1943): republished in Individualism and Economic Order (1948)
- "Planning and the Role of Law", The Eastern Economist (29 October 1943)
- Hayek, F. A. (September 1945). "The Use of Knowledge in Society". The American Economic Review. 35 (4). American Economic Association: 519–530. JSTOR 1809376.
  - republished in Individualism and Economic Order (1948)
- "Time-Preference and Productivity: A Reconsideration", Economica n.s, 12, no. 4 (February 1945)
- "The London School of Economics 1895–1945", Economica n.s. 13, no. 49 (February 1946)
- "The Meaning of Competition" (1946): republished in Individualism and Economic Order (1948)
- "Re-Nazification at Work", The Spectator (London, 31 January 1947)
- "Opening Address to a Conference at Mont Pèlerin" (1947)
- "'Free' Enterprise and Competitive Order" (1947)
- "The Intellectuals and Socialism", The University of Chicago Law Review 16, no. 3 (Spring 1949)
- "Portraits of J. S. Mill", The Times Literary Supplement (11 November 1949)
- "Economics", Chambers’ Encyclopaedia 4 (Oxford 1950)
- "Ricardo, David", Chambers’ Encyclopaedia 10–11 (Oxford 1950)
- "Full Employment, Planning and Inflation", Institute of Public Affairs Review 4 (6) (1950)
- "Capitalism and the Proletariat", Farmand 7, no. 56 (Oslo, 17 February 1951)
- "Comte and Hegel", Measure 2 (Chicago, July 1951): Reprinted in The Counter-Revolution of Science (1952)
- "The Transmission of the Ideals of Economic Freedom," (1951) Full Article
- "Worldwide Shortcomings of Wartime Planning", Commercial and Financial Chronicle (18 April 1951)
- "The Case Against Progressive Income Taxes", The Freeman 7 (28 December 1953)
- "Leftist Foreign Correspondent", The Freeman 3 (12 January 1953)
- "The Rise and Decline of the Rule of Law – I: Isonomy", Time and Tide (7 March 1953)
- "The Rise and Decline of the Rule of Law – II: Government of Law", Time and Tide (14 March 1953)
- "The Rise and Decline of the Rule of Law – III: The Rechtsstaat", Time and Tide (21 March 1953)
- "The Rise and Decline of the Rule of Law – IV: The Destruction of the Rule of Law by Socialist Jurisprudence", Time and Tide (28 March 1953)
- "History and Politics", Introduction to Capitalism and the Historians (1954)
- "Degrees of Explanation", The British Journal for the Philosophy of Science 6, no, 23 (1955)
- "The Dilemma of Specialization", in Leonard D. White (ed.), The State of the Social Sciences (1956)
- "The Road to Serfdom after Twelve Years", Foreword to the American paperback edition of the book (1956)
- "Was ist und was heisst ‘“‘sozial’’?" In Albert Hunold (ed.), Masse und Demokratie (1957): "What is “Social” – What Does It Mean?" published in Studies in Philosophy, Politics and Economics (1967)
- "The Creative Powers of a Free Civilization", In Felix Morley (ed.), Essays in Individuality (1958)
- "Economic Myths of Early Capitalism" In Essays on Liberty (1958)
- "Unions, Inflation and Profits" In Philip D. Bradley (ed.), The Public Stake in Union Power (1959)
- "Contribution to 'Symposium on Keynes: Why?'" in Christian Science Monitor (1959)
- "The Free Market Economy: The Most Efficient Way of Solving Economic Problems" (1959)
- "Inflation and Welfare State-ism", Commercial and Financial Chronicle (19 March 1959)
- "New Nations and the Problem of Power", The Listener (10 November 1960)
- "The "Non Sequitur" of the "Dependence Effect"", The Southern Economic Journal 27, no. 4 (April 1961)
- "Freedom and Coercion: Some Comments and Mr. Hamowy’s Criticism", New Individualist Review 1, no. 2 (Summer 1961)
- "The Moral Element in Free Enterprise", In National Association of Manufacturers (ed.), The Spiritual and Moral Significance of Free Enterprise (1962)
- "Rules, Perception and Intelligibility", Proceedings of the British Academy 48 (1962)
- "The Uses of "Gresham's Law" as an Illustration of "Historical Theory"", History and Theory 1 (1962)
- "The Legal and Political Philosophy of David Hume", Il Politico 28, no. 4 (December 1963)
- "The Theory of Complex Phenomena": In Mario A. Bunge (ed.), The Critical Approach to Science and Philosophy: Essays in Honor of Karl R. Popper (1964)
- "Kinds of Order in Society", New Individualist Review (University of Chicago) 3, no. 2 (Winter 1964)
- "Kinds of Rationalism", The Economic Studies Quarterly 15, no. 3 (Tokyo, 1965).
- "Personal Recollections of Keynes and the "Keynesian Revolution"", The Oriental Economist 34 (Tokyo, January 1966)
- "The Misconception of Human Rights as Positive Claims", Farmand Anniversary Issue 2, no. 12 (Oslo 1966)
- "The Principles of a Liberal Social Order", Il Politico 31, no. 4 (December 1966)
- "Dr. Bernard Mandeville", Proceedings of the British Academy 52 (1966)
- "The Results of Human Action but not of Human Design" (1967)
- "Notes on the Evolution of Systems of Rules of Conduct (The Interplay between Rules of Individual Conduct and the Social Order of Actions.)" (1967)
- "The Constitution of a Liberal State", Il Politico 32, no. 1 (September 1967)
- "Bruno Leoni, the Scholar", Il Politico 33, no. 1 (March 1968)
- "A Self-Generating Order for Society", In John Nef (ed.), Towards World Community (1968)
- "Competition as a Discovery Procedure" (1968)
- "Economic Thought, VI: The Austrian School.", In International Encyclopaedia of the Social Sciences, Edited by David L. Sills (1968)
- "Menger, Carl.", In International Encyclopaedia of the Social Sciences, Edited by David L. Sills (1968)
- "Wieser, Friedrich von.", In International Encyclopaedia of the Social Sciences, Edited by David L. Sills (1968)
- "Three Elucidations of the "Ricardo Effect"", Journal of Political Economy 77, no. 2 (March–April 1969)
- "The Primacy of 'the Abstract", In Arthur Koestler and J. R. Smythies (eds.), Beyond Reductionism – The Alpbach Symposium (1969)
- "Principles or Expediency?" In Toward Liberty: Essays in Honor of Ludwig von Mises on the Occasion of his 90th Birthday, 29 September 1971. (1971)
- "Nature vs. Nurture Once Again" (1971)
- "The Illusion of a Just Incomes Policy", The Financial Times (London, 19 April 1972)
- "Tribute to von Mises, Vienna Years", National Review (Autumn 1973)
- "Keynesian Kaleidics", Letter to The Times Literary Supplement (4 October 1974)
- "The Pretence of Knowledge" (1974)
- "Economics, Politics and Freedom: an Interview with F. A. Hayek" Interview conducted by Tibor Machan in Salzburg, Austria. Reason 6 (February 1975): 4–12.
- "The Courage of his Convictions", In Tribute to Mises 1881–1973 (1975)
- "Types of Mind", Encounter 45 (September 1975): revised as "Two Types of Mind" and republihsed in New Studies (1978)
- "A Discussion with Friedrich Hayek" (9 April 1975)
- "Adam Smith's Message in Today's Language", Daily Telegraph (London, 9 March 1976)
- "The Atavism of Social Justice" (1976)
- "Whither Democracy?", A lecture delivered to the Institute of Public Affairs, New South Wales, Sydney on 8 October 1976
- "Socialism and Science" (1976)
- "Liberal Pact with Labour", Letter to The Times (31 March 1977)
- "Remembering My Cousin Ludwig Wittgenstein", Encounter (August 1977)
- "Toward Free Market Money", The Wall Street Journal (19 August 1977)
- "Coping with Ignorance", Ludwig von Mises Memorial Lecture. Imprimis (Hillsdale College) 7 (July 1978)
- "The Miscarriage of the Democratic Ideal", Encounter 50, no. 3 (March 1978)
- "Can we still avoid inflation?" In Richard M. Ebeling (ed.), The Austrian Theory of the Trade Cycle and Other Essays (1978)
- "Towards a Free Market Monetary System" (1979)
- "The Errors of Constructivism", Forbes Magazine (10 December 1979)
- "Recession as Inflation’s Only Cure", Business Week (15 December 1980)
- "Two Pages of Fiction", Economic Affairs (1982)
- "The Austrian Critique of Keynes", The Economist (11 June 1983)
- "The Muddle of the Middle", in Svetozar Pejovič (ed.), Philosophical and economic foundations of capitalism (1983)
- "Friedrich Hayek on the Crisis", Encounter (June 1983)
- "Beware This Weasel Word", The Times (11 November 1983)
- "The Origins and Effects of Our Morals: A Problem for Science” In Nishiyama and Leube (eds.), The Essence of Hayek (1984)
- "Tribute to Ludwig von Mises by F. A. von Hayek Given at a Party in Honor of Mises New York, March 7, 1956", published in Margit von Mises, My Years with Ludwig von Mises (second enlarged edition, 1984)
- "The Theory of Currency Competition: I.1 The Future Unit of Value." Section of P. Salin (ed.), Currency Competition and Monetary Union (1984): "The Future Monetary Unit of Value" in Barry N. Siegel (ed.), Money in Crisis: The Federal Reserve, and Monetary Reform (1984)
- "Socialism, Liberalism, and the Young" in Arthur Sheldon (ed.), The ‘New Right’ Enlightenment: The Spectre that Haunts the Left (1985)
- "The Moral Imperative of the Market", in The Unfinished Agenda: Essays on the Political Economy of Government Policy in Honour of Arthur Seldon (1986)
- "Market Standards for Money", Economic Affairs (1986)
- "The Flow of Goods and Services", in Hansjoerg Klausinger (ed.), Business Cycles: Part II (2012)
- "The Overrated Reason", Journal of the History of Economic Thought (2013)
- "A New Look at Economic Theory": Four Lectures Given at the University of Virginia, 1961, in Bruce Caldwell (ed.), The Market and Other Orders (2014)
- "Economists and Philosophers": Walgreen Lecture, University of Chicago, 1963, in Bruce Caldwell (ed.), The Market and Other Orders (2014)

== Later publications ==
- Hayek, Friedrich (1992). The Fortunes of Liberalism: Essays on Austrian Economics and the Ideal of Freedom, edited by Peter G. Klein (University of Chicago Press) ISBN 978-0-226-32116-5. OCLC 24173340
- Hayek, Friedrich (2010). Studies on the Abuse and Decline of Reason: Text and Documents, edited by Bruce Caldwell (University of Chicago Press) (essays in opposition to positivism.) ISBN 978-0-226-32109-7. OCLC 406946021
- The Constitution of Liberty: The Definitive Edition (2011). Ronald Hamowy, ed., v. 17, The Collected Works of F A. Hayek. Description and preview.
- Hayek, Friedrich (2015). Hayek on Mill: The Mill-Taylor Friendship and Related Writings, edited by Sandra J. Peart (University of Chicago Press) ISBN 978-0-226-10639-7. OCLC 648146235
