= Spontaneous order =

Theory of economy and sociology

In economics and the social sciences, spontaneous order is the emergence of large-scale patterns of social coordination from the actions of many individuals, none of whom intends or designs the overall results. The Austrian economist Friedrich Hayek is the best known modern exponent of the idea, borrowing from the Scottish Enlightenment philosopher Adam Ferguson, he characterizes spontaneous order as "the result of human action but not of human design". Common examples of spontaneous order include language, morality, common law system, money, markets, evolution of life on Earth, crystal structure, the Internet, Wikipedia, and free market economy.

== Concept ==
In theory, the order arises because individuals pursuing their own separate goals interact under general rules of conduct, and their many local adjustments produce an overall pattern of coordination that no participant planned or could design. Hayek distinguished such "grown" or spontaneous orders, which he called cosmos, from "made" orders that are deliberately arranged by a directing authority, which he referred to as taxis. In this framework, an order is spontaneous because it is not the product of a single mind or plan, even as it results entirely from human action. Thus, it is neither arising in the nature itself, nor artificial as it is not consciously designed.

The term—self-organization—is generally used for comparable phenomena in the physical and biological sciences, while "spontaneous order" is typically used to describe the emergence of various kinds of social orders in human social networks from the behavior of a combination of self-interested individuals who are not intentionally trying to create an order.

== History ==
According to Murray Rothbard, the philosopher Zhuangzi (c. 369–286 BC) was the first to propose the idea of spontaneous order. Zhuangzi rejected the authoritarianism of Confucianism, writing that there "has been such a thing as letting mankind alone; there has never been such a thing as governing mankind [with success]." He articulated an early form of spontaneous order, asserting that "good order results spontaneously when things are let alone", a concept later "developed particularly by Proudhon in the nineteenth [century]".

In 1767, the sociologist and historian Adam Ferguson within the context of Scottish Enlightenment described society as the "result of human action, but not the execution of any human design". Jacobs has suggested that the term "spontaneous order" was effectively coined by Michael Polanyi in his essay, "The Growth of Thought in Society".

The Austrian school of economics, led by Carl Menger, Ludwig von Mises and Friedrich Hayek made it a centerpiece in its social and economic thought. Hayek's theory of spontaneous order is the product of two related but distinct influences that do not always tend in the same direction. As an economic theorist, his explanations can be given a rational explanation. But as a legal and social theorist, he leans, by contrast, very heavily on a conservative and traditionalist approach which instructs us to submit blindly to a flow of events over which we can have little control.

== Example and related concepts ==
=== Markets ===
Many classical-liberal theorists, such as Hayek, have argued that market economies are a spontaneous order, and that they represent "a more efficient allocation of societal resources than any design could achieve." They claim this spontaneous order (referred to as the extended order in Hayek's The Fatal Conceit) is superior to any order a human mind can design due to the specifics of the information required. Centralized statistical data, they suppose, cannot convey this information because the statistics are created by abstracting away from the particulars of the situation.

According to Norman P. Barry, this is illustrated in the concept of the invisible hand proposed by Adam Smith in The Wealth of Nations.

Lawrence Reed, president of the Foundation for Economic Education, a libertarian think tank in the United States, argues that spontaneous order "is what happens when you leave people alone—when entrepreneurs... see the desires of people... and then provide for them." He further claims that "[entrepreneurs] respond to market signals, to prices. Prices tell them what's needed and how urgently and where. And it's infinitely better and more productive than relying on a handful of elites in some distant bureaucracy."

=== Anarchism ===
Anarchists argue that the state is in fact an artificial creation of the ruling elite, and that true spontaneous order would arise if it were eliminated. This is construed by some but not all as the ushering in of organization by anarchist law. In the anarchist view, such spontaneous order would involve the voluntary cooperation of individuals. According to the Oxford Dictionary of Sociology, "the work of many symbolic interactionists is largely compatible with the anarchist vision, since it harbors a view of society as spontaneous order."

=== Sobornost ===
The concept of spontaneous order can also be seen in the works of the Russian Slavophile movements and specifically in the works of Fyodor Dostoyevsky. The concept of an organic social manifestation as a concept in Russia expressed under the idea of sobornost. Sobornost was also used by Leo Tolstoy as an underpinning to the ideology of Christian anarchism. The concept was used to describe the uniting force behind the peasant or serf Obshchina in pre-Soviet Russia.

=== Other examples ===
Perhaps the most prominent exponent of spontaneous order is Friedrich Hayek. In addition to arguing the economy is a spontaneous order, which he termed a catallaxy, he argued that common law and the brain are also types of spontaneous orders. In The Republic of Science, Michael Polanyi also argued that science is a spontaneous order, a theory further developed by Bill Butos and Thomas McQuade in a variety of papers. Gus DiZerega has argued that democracy is the spontaneous order form of government, David Emmanuel Andersson has argued that religion in places like the United States is a spontaneous order, and Troy Camplin argues that artistic and literary production are spontaneous orders. Paul Krugman has also contributed to spontaneous order theory in his book The Self-Organizing Economy, in which he claims that cities are self-organizing systems. Credibility thesis suggests that the credibility of social institutions is the driving factor behind the endogenous self-organization of institutions and their persistence.

Different rules of game would cause different types of spontaneous order. If an economic society obeys the equal-opportunity rules, the resulting spontaneous order is reflected as an exponential income distribution; that is, for an equal-opportunity economic society, the exponential income distribution is most likely to evolve and survive. By analyzing datasets of household income from 66 countries and Hong Kong SAR, ranging from Europe to Latin America, North America and Asia, Tao et al. found that, for all of these countries, the income structure for the great majority of populations (low and middle income classes) follows an exponential income distribution.

== Criticism ==
Roland Kley writes about Hayek's theory of spontaneous order that "the foundations of Hayek's liberalism are so incoherent" because the "idea of spontaneous order lacks distinctness and internal structure." The three components of Hayek's theory are lack of intentionality, the "primacy of tacit or practical knowledge", and the "natural selection of competitive traditions." While the first feature, that social institutions may arise in some unintended fashion, is indeed an essential element of spontaneous order, the second two are only implications, not essential elements.

Hayek's theory has also been criticized for not offering a moral argument, and his overall outlook contains "incompatible strands that he never seeks to reconcile in a systematic manner."

Abby Innes has criticised many of the economic ideas as a fatal confrontation between economic libertarianism and reality, arguing that it represents a form of materialist utopia that has much in common with Soviet Russia

== See also ==
- Anonymous
- Deregulation
- Emergence
- Élan vital
- Free price system
- "I, Pencil" by Leonard Read
- Mutual aid
- Natural law
- Natural order
- Revolutionary spontaneity
- Stigmergy
- Tragedy of the commons
- Wu wei (effortless action)
