= Werner Erhard (disambiguation) =

Werner Erhard (born 1935) was the founder of Erhard Seminars Training, also called est.

Werner Erhard may also refer to:

- Werner Erhard and Associates (1981–1991), company started by Erhard
- Werner Erhard (book) (1978), biography of Erhard by William Warren Bartley
