= Extended order =

Economics and sociology concept

Extended order as a concept in economics and sociology first appeared in Friedrich Hayek's 1988 book The Fatal Conceit. Hayek describes an extended order as the outcome of a system that embraces specialization and trade, and he claims that it "constitutes an information gathering process, able to call up, and put to use, widely dispersed information that no central planning agency, let alone any individual, could know as a whole, possess or control." The result is an interconnected web where people can benefit from the actions and knowledge of those they don't know. This is possible and efficient, in Hayek's view, because a proper legal framework replaces trust, which is only practical in small circles of people who know each other socially. The extended order is at the heart of Hayek's thesis in The Fatal Conceit when he argues that "our civilization depends, not only for its origin but also for its preservation, on what can be precisely described only as the extended order of human cooperation, an order more commonly, if somewhat misleading, known as capitalism."

== Development of the extended order in society ==
Hayek argues that the extended order "is a framework of institutions – economic, legal, and moral – into which we fit ourselves by obeying certain rules of conduct that we never made, and which we have never understood in the sense of which we understand how the things that we manufacture function." This "order resulted not from human design or intention but spontaneously: it arose from unintentionally conforming to certain traditional & largely moral practices, many of which men tend to dislike, whose significance they usually fail to understand, whose validity they cannot prove, and which have nonetheless fairly rapidly spread by means of an evolutionary selection – the comparative increase in population & wealth – of those groups that happened to follow them."

According to Hayek, the adoption of these practices by these groups, "increased their access to valuable information of all sorts, & enabled them to be 'fruitful, and multiply, and replenish the earth, and subdue it' (Genesis 1:28). This process is perhaps the least appreciated facet of human evolution."

Hayek argues that the extended order's formation "required individuals to change their 'natural' or instinctual' responses to others, something strongly resisted", whereas any and all "constraints on the practices of the small group, it must be emphasized & repeated, are hated." This is because man "knows so many objects that seem desirable but for which he is not permitted to grasp, and he cannot see how other beneficial features of his environment depend on the discipline to which he is forced to submit – a discipline forbidding him to reach out for these same appealing objects. Disliking these constraints so much, we can hardly be said to have selected them; rather, these constraints selected us: they enabled us to survive."

Hayek says that the evolutionary process of the extended order can be stimulated by increases in individual freedom and has even realized some of its greatest advances during times of anarchy, however it can (and quite often has throughout history) been hindered by government constraint. He continues: "Protection of several property, not the direction of its use by government, laid the foundations for the growth of the dense network of exchange of services that shaped the extended order." The extended order is "not a creation of man's reason but a distinct second endowment conferred on him by cultural evolution."

Hayek posits that, since it is not genetically transferred, the continuing cultural evolution of the extended order requires teaching and passing on to each new generation the prevailing traditions, customs, morality and rules. This cultural evolutionary requirement was also analyzed by Will and Ariel Durant who said: "Civilization is not inherited; it has to be learned and earned by each generation anew; if the transmission should be interrupted for one century, civilization would die, and we should be savages again."

== See also ==
- Catallactics
- Free Market
- Spontaneous order
