= W. W. Bartley III =

American philosopher

- Born: October 2, 1934; Wilkinsburg, Pennsylvania, U.S.
- Died: February 5, 1990 (aged 55); Oakland, California, U.S.
- Occupations: Philosopher; professor; author; advisory board member of Erhard Seminars Training

William Warren Bartley III (October 2, 1934 – February 5, 1990), known as W. W. Bartley III, was an American philosopher specializing in 20th century philosophy, language and logic, and the Vienna Circle.

== Early life and education ==
Born in Wilkinsburg, Pennsylvania, on October 2, 1934, Bartley was brought up in a Protestant home. He completed his secondary education in Pittsburgh and studied at Harvard University between 1952 and 1956, graduating with a BA degree in philosophy. While an undergraduate at Harvard, he was an editor at The Harvard Crimson newspaper. He spent the winter semester of 1956 and the summer semester of 1957 at the Harvard Divinity School and the Episcopal Theological School in Cambridge, Massachusetts. In 1958, he completed his MA degree in philosophy at Harvard. Bartley was training to become a Protestant minister, but rejected Christianity at that point. He went on to study under Sir Karl Popper at the London School of Economics, where he completed his PhD in 1962. Parts of his dissertation, Limits of Rationality: A Critical Study of Some Logical Problems of Contemporary Pragmatism and Related Movements, were subsequently published as The Retreat to Commitment in the same year.

== Career ==
After his doctoral graduation, Bartley worked as a lecturer in logic in London. In the following years, he held positions at the Warburg Institute and the University of California, San Diego. He began teaching at the University of Pittsburgh in 1963, and was appointed to his first full professorship there in 1969.

In 1973, he joined the California State University, Hayward faculty as a professor of philosophy, where he received the distinction of "Outstanding Professor" of the entire California State University system in 1979. His last position there before his retirement was that of a senior research fellow at the Hoover Institution.

== Relationship with Sir Karl Popper ==
Bartley and Popper had a great admiration for each other, partly because of their common stand against justificationism. However, at the International Colloquium in the Philosophy of Science at Bedford College, University of London, July 11–17, 1965, they came into conflict with each other. Bartley had presented a paper, "Theories of Demarcation Between Science and Metaphysics," in which he accused Popper of displaying a positivist attitude in his early works and proposed that Popper's demarcation criterion was not as important as Popper thought it was. Popper took this as a personal attack, and Bartley took his reply as indicating that Popper was ignoring his criticism. Their friendship was not restored until 1974, after the publication of The Philosophy of Karl Popper (edited by Paul Schillpp). Bartley changed the tone of his remarks about Popper's criterion of demarcation, making it less aggressive. However, despite the restored friendship, Bartley's view was never accepted by Popper, who criticised it even after Bartley's death.

== Author and editor ==
Bartley published a biography of the philosopher Ludwig Wittgenstein, titled simply Wittgenstein, in 1973. The book contained a relatively brief, 4–5 page treatment of Wittgenstein's homosexuality, relying mainly on reportage from the philosopher's friends and acquaintances. This matter caused enormous controversy in intellectual and philosophical circles; many perceived it as a posthumous "attack" on Wittgenstein. For example one review by Reuben Goodstein criticized what he called Bartley's "vicious and unsubstantiated charge of promiscuity ... written in language which is calculated to give the maximum offence both to Wittgenstein's family and to the many who knew and admired him". He adds that "Bartley's claim to have met in the parks and bars of Vienna men who remembered chance encounters with Wittgenstein more than fifty years ago is as mischievously irresponsible as his pretence to support the charge by quotations from letters which in fact do not at all support the construction Bartley places upon them".

Some foreign translations of the book, such as the first edition of the Spanish translation, omitted the "offending" material. In the second edition of the biography (La Salle, Illinois: Open Court, 1985, pp. 159–97), Bartley answered the objections of critics, pointing out that Wittgenstein's periods of active homosexuality are verified by the philosopher's own private writings, including his coded diaries, and that extensive confirmation was also available from people who knew Wittgenstein in Vienna between the two World Wars, including ex-lovers. Bartley also considered, and rejected, the idea of a connection between the private life and the philosophy.

Bartley also wrote a biography of Werner Erhard, the founder of Erhard Seminars Training. Bartley was graduate of Erhard Seminars Training and served on its advisory board.

Bartley edited Lewis Carroll's book Symbolic Logic (see symbolic logic), including the second volume, which Carroll had never published.

Bartley extended Popperian epistemology in his book The Retreat to Commitment, in which he describes pancritical rationalism (PCR), a development of critical rationalism and panrationalism. PCR attempts to work around the problem of ultimate commitment or infinite regress by decoupling criticism and justification. A pancritical rationalist holds all positions open to criticism, including PCR, and never resorts to authority for justification.

Parts of Popper's Realism and the Aim of Science, a book that Bartley edited, and the Addendum to the fourth edition of The Open Society and Its Enemies contain passages that are commonly interpreted as Popper's acceptance of Bartley's views. Mariano Artigas held that these were in fact written by Bartley himself.

Alan Ebenstein, a biographer of F. A. Hayek, criticized Bartley for the extent of the changes he made as the editor of The Fatal Conceit, a book attributed to Hayek. Bruce Caldwell suggests that the book in its published form may actually have been written by Bartley.

== Death ==
Bartley died of bladder cancer on February 5, 1990, at his home in Oakland, California, after having been diagnosed with the disease in the middle of the preceding year.

At the time of his death, Bartley had just finished his last book, Unfathomed Knowledge, Unmeasured Wealth: On Universities and the Wealth of Nations. Other works he was preparing at that time included writing a biography, and editing the collected works, of Friedrich Hayek. The latter was being completed after Bartley's death by his colleague and executor Stephen Kresge. Also unfinished was a biography of Popper. Both biographies were in an advanced stage at the time of Bartley's death.

== Bibliography ==
- Bartley, William W. (1962). The Retreat to Commitment. New York: Alfred A. Knopf – via Internet Archive.
- Morality and Religion, 1971
- Carrol, Lewis (1977). Bartley, William W. (ed.). Lewis Carroll's Symbolic Logic. Harvester Press (John Spiers) – via Internet Archive.
- Bartley, William Warren (1985). Wittgenstein (2nd ed.). Open Court. ISBN 978-0-87548-441-9.
- Ludwig Wittgenstein e Karl Popper: maestri di scuola elementare, 1976
- Come demarcare la scienza della metafisica, 1983
- Werner Erhard: The Transformation of a Man, The Founding of est, 1978
- Popper, Karl R. (1982). Bartley, William W. (ed.). The Open Universe, An Argument for Indeterminism: From the Postscript of the Logic of Scientific Discovery. Vol. II. Totowa, New Jersey: Rowman and Littlefield. ISBN 978-0-8476-7016-1.
- Popper, Karl R. (1983). Bartley, William W. (ed.). The Realism and the Aim of Science: From the Postscript of the Logic of Scientific Discovery. Vol. I. Totowa, New Jersey: Rowman and Littlefield. ISBN 978-0-8476-7015-4.
- Popper, Karl R. (1985). Bartley, William W. (ed.). Quantum Theory and the Schism of Physics: From the Postscript of the Logic of Scientific Discovery. Vol. III. Totowa, New Jersey: Rowman and Littlefield.
- Hayek, F.A. (1988). Bartley, William W. (ed.). The Collected Works of F.A. Hayek: The Fatal Conceit: The Errors of Socialism. Vol. I. Chicago: University of Chicago Press. ISBN 978-0-226-32068-7.
- Radnitzky, Gerard; Bartley, William W., eds. (1988). Evolutionary Epistemology, Rationality, and the Sociology of Knowledge. La Salle, Illinois: Open Court.
- Bartley, William W. (1989). "The Market in Ideas and the Entrenchment of False Philosophies". In Meiners, Roger E.; Amacher, Ryan C. (eds.). The Federal Support for Higher Education: The Growing Challenge to Intellectual Freedom. New York: Paragon House. pp. 293-336 – via Internet Archive.
- Rehearsing a Revolution – Karl Popper: A Life, 1989
- Unfathomed Knowledge, Unmeasured Wealth. 1990.
- Hayek, F.A. (1991). Bartley, William W.; Kresge, Stephen (eds.). The Collected Works of F.A. Hayek: The Trend of Economic Thinking. Vol. II. Chicago: University of Chicago Press. ISBN 978-0-86597-742-6.
- Leeson, Robert (ed.). Hayek: A Collaborative Biography: Part 1 Influences from Mises to Bartley. UK: Palgrave Macmillan, 2013.

== See also ==
- American philosophy
- List of American philosophers
