= The Counter-Revolution of Science =

1952 book by Friedrich von Hayek

- Cover of the first edition
- Author: Friedrich Hayek
- Language: English
- Subject: Political economy
- Publisher: Liberty Fund Inc.
- Publication date: 1952, 1980
- Publication place: United States
- Media type: Print (hardback & paperback)
- Pages: 415
- ISBN: 0913966665
- OCLC: 265949

The Counter-Revolution of Science: Studies on the Abuse of Reason is a 1952 book by Nobel laureate economist Friedrich Hayek. In it Hayek condemns the positivist view of the social sciences for what he sees as scientism, arguing that attempts to apply the methods of natural science to the study of social institutions necessarily overlook the dispersed knowledge of the individuals which compose those institutions.

== Synopsis ==
This book is divided into three parts. The first is a reworking of Hayek's essay "Scientism and the Study of Society". The second part is an intellectual history of French positivism. Hayek lifts the title of the book from a name given to the movement by Louis de Bonald, a French counter-revolutionary and contemporary of Saint-Simon. The last segment examines Comte and Hegel, and their similar takes on the philosophy of history. The first two sections were both originally published in the peer-reviewed magazine Economica, in the early 1940s.

In Hayek's view the task of the natural sciences is to replace the qualitative description of nature provided by the senses with a quantitative description which is arrived at through experiment:

[W]hat men know or think about the external world or about themselves, their concepts and even the subjective qualities of their sense perceptions are to Science never ultimate reality, data to be accepted. Its concern is not what men think about the world and how they consequently behave, but what they ought to think. The concepts which men actually employ, the way in which they see nature, is to the scientist necessarily a provisional affair and his task is to change this picture, to change the concepts in use so as to be able to make more definite and more certain our statements about the new classes of events.

— Friedrich A. Hayek, The Counter-Revolution of Science (II: The Problem and the Method of the Natural Sciences)

Hayek then goes on to argue that, in this view, the methods of the natural sciences are inadequate in the social sciences because subjective knowledge, the knowledge that other people classify the world as we do, is relevant to the study of human activity:

[T]he object, the "facts" of the social sciences are also opinions—not opinions of the student of the social phenomena, of course, but opinions of those whose actions produce the object of the social scientist. In one sense his facts are thus as little "subjective" as those of the natural sciences, because they are independent of the particular observer; what he studies is not determined by his fancy or imagination but is in the same manner given to the observation by different people. But in another sense in which we distinguish facts from opinions, the facts of the social sciences are merely opinions, views held by the people whose actions we study. They differ from the facts of the physical sciences in being beliefs or opinions held by particular people, beliefs which as such are our data, irrespective of whether they are true or false, and which, moreover, we cannot directly observe in the minds of the people but which we can recognize from what they do and say merely because we have ourselves a mind similar to theirs.

— Friedrich A. Hayek, The Counter-Revolution of Science (III: The Subjective Character of the Data of the Social Sciences)

== Publishing history ==
Parts of the book were published in Economica magazine in the early 1940s. The book itself was compiled and printed in 1952. It eventually fell out of print, but was re-published in the US in 1980, and has remained available since.

== Reception ==
Czech Neo-Marxist Karel Kosík in his book Dialectics of the Concrete (1976) criticizes the following passage of the book: "The object of scientific inquiry is never the totality of all observable phenomena in a given time and space, but always only certain aspects of it ... The human spirit can never encompass the 'whole' in the sense of all different aspects of the real situation". Kosík, who believes Hayek wrote it in a polemic against Marxist concept of totality, clarifies that, "Totality indeed does not signify all facts. Totality signifies reality as structured dialectical whole, within which any particular fact (or any group or set of facts) can be rationally comprehended" as "the cognition of a fact or of a set of facts is the cognition of their place in the totality of reality." He considers Hayek's theory to be part of the atomist–rationalist philosophical thinking of reality, declaring "Opinions as to whether cognition of all facts is knowable or not are based on the rationalist–empiricist idea that cognition proceeds by the analytic–summative method. This idea is in turn based on the atomist idea of reality as a sum of things, processes and facts". Kosík claims that Hayek and those philosophers (including Karl Popper on The Poverty of Historicism and Ferdinand Gonseth of Dialectica) lack the understanding of the dialectical process of forming the totality.

American philosopher Susan Haack references Hayek's book several times in her 2009 essay "Six Signs of Scientism".
