= Rationalism =

Epistemological view centered on reason

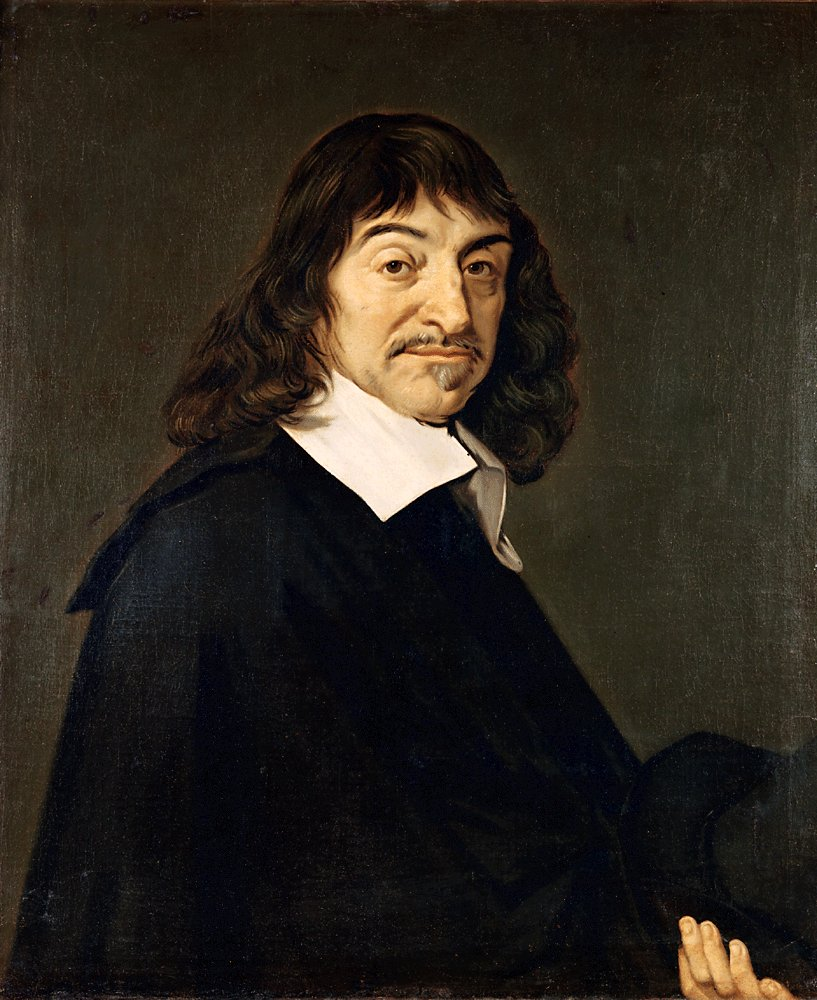
René Descartes

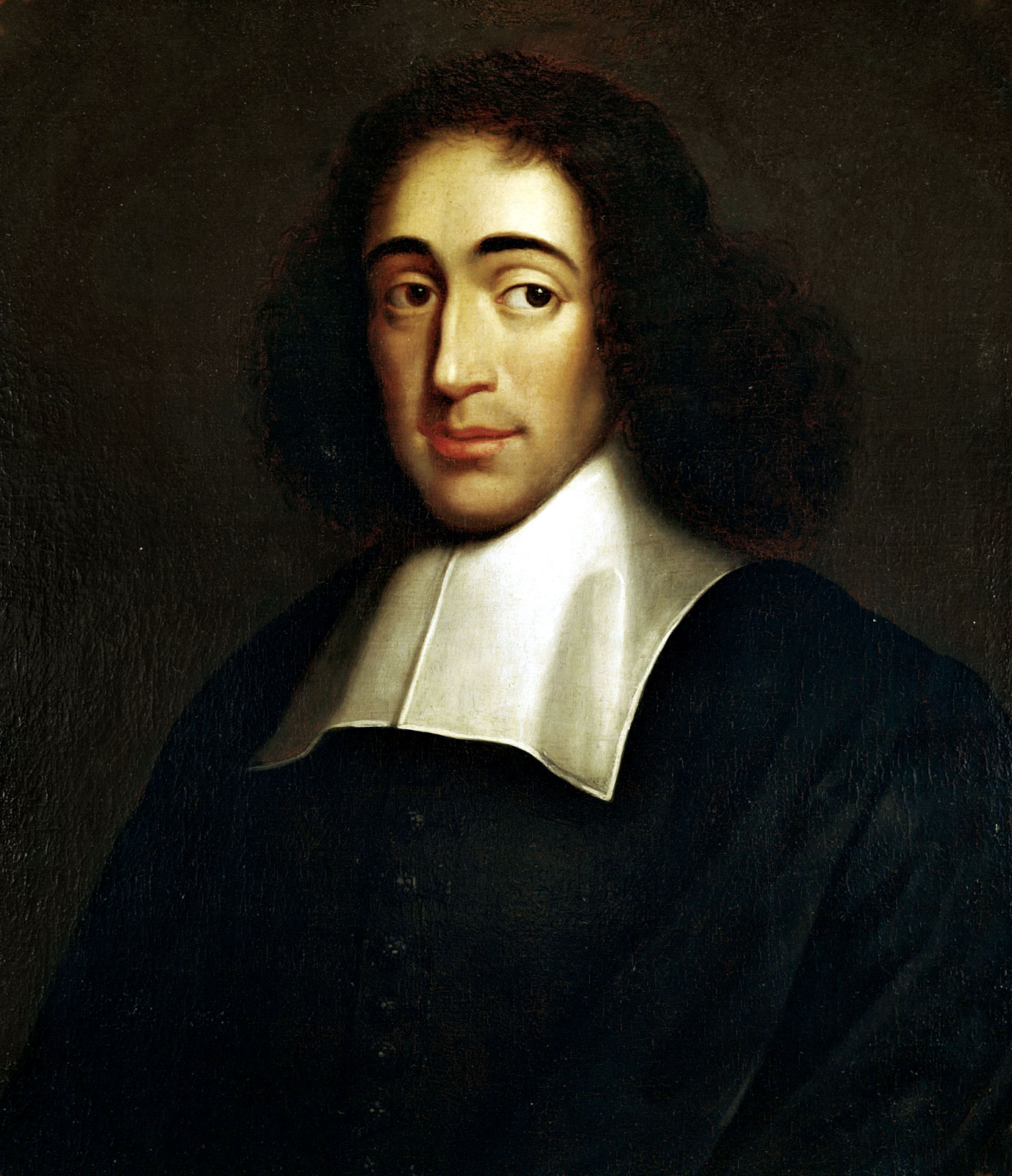
Baruch Spinoza

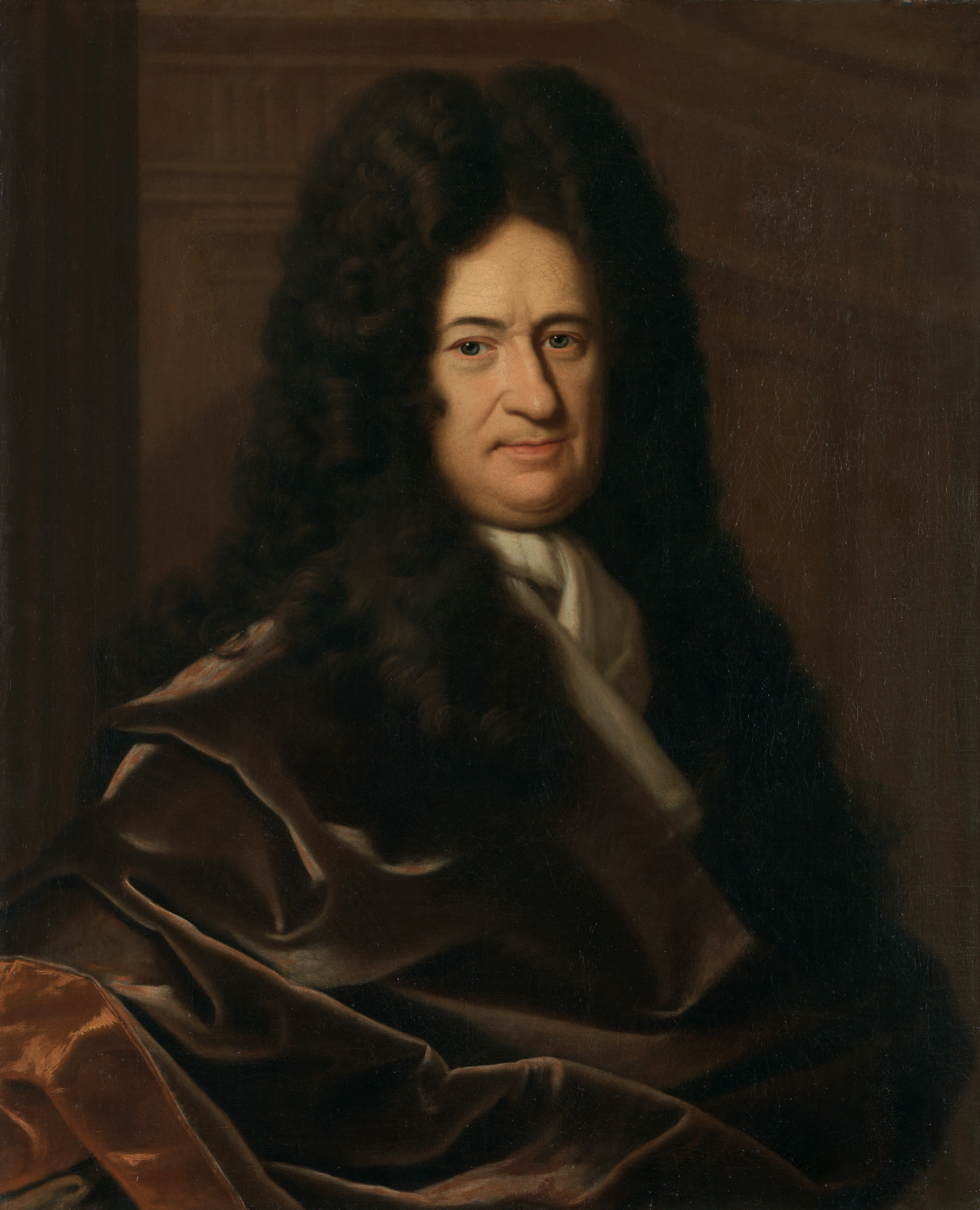
Gottfried Leibniz

In philosophy, rationalism is the epistemological view that "regards reason as the chief source and test of knowledge" or "the position that reason has precedence over other ways of acquiring knowledge", often in contrast to other possible sources of knowledge such as faith, tradition, or sensory experience. More formally, rationalism is defined as a methodology or a theory "in which the criterion of truth is not sensory but intellectual and deductive".

In a major philosophical debate during the Enlightenment, rationalism (sometimes here equated with innatism) was opposed to empiricism. On the one hand, rationalists like René Descartes emphasized that knowledge is primarily innate and the intellect, the inner faculty of the human mind, can therefore directly grasp or derive logical truths; on the other hand, empiricists like John Locke emphasized that knowledge is not primarily innate and is best gained by careful observation of the physical world outside the mind, namely through sensory experiences. Rationalists asserted that certain principles exist in logic, mathematics, ethics, and metaphysics that are so fundamentally true that denying them causes one to fall into contradiction. The rationalists had such a high confidence in reason that empirical proof and physical evidence were regarded as unnecessary to ascertain certain truths – in other words, "there are significant ways in which our concepts and knowledge are gained independently of sense experience".

Different degrees of emphasis on this method or theory lead to a range of rationalist standpoints, from the moderate position "that reason has precedence over other ways of acquiring knowledge" to the more extreme position that reason is "the unique path to knowledge". Given a pre-modern understanding of reason, rationalism is identical to philosophy, the Socratic life of inquiry, or the zetetic (skeptical) clear interpretation of authority (open to the underlying or essential cause of things as they appear to our sense of certainty).

== Background ==
Rationalism has a philosophical history dating from antiquity. The analytical nature of much of philosophical enquiry, the awareness of apparently a priori domains of knowledge such as mathematics, combined with the emphasis of obtaining knowledge through the use of rational faculties (commonly rejecting, for example, direct revelation) have made rationalist themes very prevalent in the history of philosophy.

Since the Enlightenment, rationalism is usually associated with the introduction of mathematical methods into philosophy as seen in the works of Descartes, Leibniz, and Spinoza. This is commonly called continental rationalism, because it was predominant in the continental schools of Europe, whereas in Britain empiricism dominated.

Even then, the distinction between rationalists and empiricists was drawn at a later period and would not have been recognized by the philosophers involved. Also, the distinction between the two philosophies is not as clear-cut as is sometimes suggested; for example, Descartes and Locke have similar views about the nature of human ideas.

Proponents of some varieties of rationalism argue that, starting with foundational basic principles, like the axioms of geometry, one could deductively derive the rest of all possible knowledge. Notable philosophers who held this view most clearly were Baruch Spinoza and Gottfried Leibniz, whose attempts to grapple with the epistemological and metaphysical problems raised by Descartes led to a development of the fundamental approach of rationalism. Both Spinoza and Leibniz asserted that, in principle, all knowledge, including scientific knowledge, could be gained through the use of reason alone, though they both observed that this was not possible in practice for human beings except in specific areas such as mathematics. On the other hand, Leibniz admitted in his book Monadology that "we are all mere Empirics in three fourths of our actions."

=== Political usage ===
In politics, rationalism, since the Enlightenment, historically emphasized a "politics of reason" centered upon rationality, deontology, utilitarianism, secularism, and irreligion – the latter aspect's antitheism was later softened by the adoption of pluralistic reasoning methods practicable regardless of religious or irreligious ideology. In this regard, the philosopher John Cottingham noted how rationalism, a methodology, became socially conflated with atheism, a worldview:

In the past, particularly in the 17th and 18th centuries, the term 'rationalist' was often used to refer to free thinkers of an anti-clerical and anti-religious outlook, and for a time the word acquired a distinctly pejorative force (thus in 1670 Sanderson spoke disparagingly of 'a mere rationalist, that is to say in plain English an atheist of the late edition...'). The use of the label 'rationalist' to characterize a world outlook which has no place for the supernatural is becoming less popular today; terms like 'humanist' or 'materialist' seem largely to have taken its place. But the old usage still survives.

== Philosophical usage ==
Rationalism is often contrasted with empiricism. Taken very broadly, these views are not mutually exclusive, since – on some definitions – a philosopher can be both rationalist and empiricist. Taken to extremes, the empiricist view holds that all ideas come to us a posteriori, that is to say, through experience; either through the external senses or through such inner sensations as pain and gratification. The empiricist essentially believes that knowledge is based on or derived directly from experience. The rationalist believes we come to knowledge a priori – through the use of logic – and is thus independent of sensory experience. In other words, as Galen Strawson once wrote, "you can see that it is true just lying on your couch. You don't have to get up off your couch and go outside and examine the way things are in the physical world. You don't have to do any science."

Between both philosophies, the issue at hand is the fundamental source of human knowledge and the proper techniques for verifying what we think we know. Whereas both philosophies are under the umbrella of epistemology, their argument lies in the understanding of the warrant, which is under the wider epistemic umbrella of the theory of justification. Part of epistemology, this theory attempts to understand the justification of propositions and beliefs. Epistemologists are concerned with various epistemic features of belief, which include the ideas of justification, warrant, rationality, and probability. Of these four terms, the term that has been most widely used and discussed by the early 21st century is "warrant". Loosely speaking, justification is the reason that someone (probably) holds a belief.

If A makes a claim and then B casts doubt on it, A's next move would normally be to provide justification for the claim. The precise method one uses to provide justification is where the lines are drawn between rationalism and empiricism (among other philosophical views). Much of the debate in these fields are focused on analyzing the nature of knowledge and how it relates to connected notions such as truth, belief, and justification.

At its core, rationalism consists of three basic claims. For people to consider themselves rationalists, they must adopt at least one of these three claims: the intuition/deduction thesis, the innate knowledge thesis, or the innate concept thesis. In addition, a rationalist can choose to adopt the claim of Indispensability of Reason and or the claim of Superiority of Reason, although one can be a rationalist without adopting either thesis.

The indispensability of reason thesis: "The knowledge we gain in subject area, S, by intuition and deduction, as well as the ideas and instances of knowledge in S that are innate to us, could not have been gained by us through sense experience." In short, this thesis claims that experience cannot provide what we gain from reason.

The superiority of reason thesis: '"The knowledge we gain in subject area S by intuition and deduction or have innately is superior to any knowledge gained by sense experience". In other words, this thesis claims reason is superior to experience as a source for knowledge.

Rationalists often adopt similar stances on other aspects of philosophy. Most rationalists reject skepticism for the areas of knowledge they claim are knowable a priori. When you claim some truths are innately known to us, one must reject skepticism in relation to those truths. Especially for rationalists who adopt the Intuition/Deduction thesis, the idea of epistemic foundationalism tends to crop up. This is the view that we know some truths without basing our belief in them on any others and that we then use this foundational knowledge to know more truths.

=== Intuition/deduction thesis ===
"Some propositions in a particular subject area, S, are knowable by us by intuition alone; still others are knowable by being deduced from intuited propositions."

Generally speaking, intuition is a priori knowledge or experiential belief characterized by its immediacy; a form of rational insight. We simply "see" something in such a way as to give us a warranted belief. Beyond that, the nature of intuition is hotly debated. In the same way, generally speaking, deduction is the process of reasoning from one or more general premises to reach a logically certain conclusion. Using valid arguments, we can deduce from intuited premises.

For example, when we combine both concepts, we can intuit that the number three is prime and that it is greater than two. We then deduce from this knowledge that there is a prime number greater than two. Thus, it can be said that intuition and deduction combined to provide us with a priori knowledge – we gained this knowledge independently of sense experience.

To argue in favor of this thesis, Gottfried Wilhelm Leibniz, a prominent German philosopher, says,

The senses, although they are necessary for all our actual knowledge, are not sufficient to give us the whole of it, since the senses never give anything but instances, that is to say particular or individual truths. Now all the instances which confirm a general truth, however numerous they may be, are not sufficient to establish the universal necessity of this same truth, for it does not follow that what happened before will happen in the same way again. … From which it appears that necessary truths, such as we find in pure mathematics, and particularly in arithmetic and geometry, must have principles whose proof does not depend on instances, nor consequently on the testimony of the senses, although without the senses it would never have occurred to us to think of them…

Empiricists such as David Hume have been willing to accept this thesis for describing the relationships among our own concepts. In this sense, empiricists argue that we are allowed to intuit and deduce truths from knowledge that has been obtained a posteriori.

By injecting different subjects into the Intuition/Deduction thesis, we are able to generate different arguments. Most rationalists agree mathematics is knowable by applying the intuition and deduction. Some go further to include ethical truths into the category of things knowable by intuition and deduction. Furthermore, some rationalists also claim metaphysics is knowable in this thesis. Naturally, the more subjects the rationalists claim to be knowable by the Intuition/Deduction thesis, the more certain they are of their warranted beliefs, and the more strictly they adhere to the infallibility of intuition, the more controversial their truths or claims and the more radical their rationalism.

In addition to different subjects, rationalists sometimes vary the strength of their claims by adjusting their understanding of the warrant. Some rationalists understand warranted beliefs to be beyond even the slightest doubt; others are more conservative and understand the warrant to be belief beyond a reasonable doubt.

Rationalists also have different understanding and claims involving the connection between intuition and truth. Some rationalists claim that intuition is infallible and that anything we intuit to be true is as such. More contemporary rationalists accept that intuition is not always a source of certain knowledge – thus allowing for the possibility of a deceiver who might cause the rationalist to intuit a false proposition in the same way a third party could cause the rationalist to have perceptions of nonexistent objects.

=== Innate knowledge thesis ===
"We have knowledge of some truths in a particular subject area, S, as part of our rational nature."

The Innate Knowledge thesis is similar to the Intuition/Deduction thesis in the regard that both theses claim knowledge is gained a priori. The two theses go their separate ways when describing how that knowledge is gained. As the name, and the rationale, suggests, the Innate Knowledge thesis claims knowledge is simply part of our rational nature. Experiences can trigger a process that allows this knowledge to come into our consciousness, but the experiences do not provide us with the knowledge itself. The knowledge has been with us since the beginning and the experience simply brought into focus, in the same way a photographer can bring the background of a picture into focus by changing the aperture of the lens. The background was always there, just not in focus.

This thesis targets a problem with the nature of inquiry originally postulated by Plato in Meno. Here, Plato asks about inquiry; how do we gain knowledge of a theorem in geometry? We inquire into the matter. Yet, knowledge by inquiry seems impossible. In other words, "If we already have the knowledge, there is no place for inquiry. If we lack the knowledge, we don't know what we are seeking and cannot recognize it when we find it. Either way we cannot gain knowledge of the theorem by inquiry. Yet, we do know some theorems." The Innate Knowledge thesis offers a solution to this paradox. By claiming that knowledge is already with us, either consciously or unconsciously, a rationalist claims we don't really learn things in the traditional usage of the word, but rather that we simply use words we know.

=== Innate concept thesis ===
"We have some of the concepts we employ in a particular subject area, S, as part of our rational nature."

Similar to the Innate Knowledge thesis, the Innate Concept thesis suggests that some concepts are simply part of our rational nature. These concepts are a priori in nature and sense experience is irrelevant to determining the nature of these concepts (though, sense experience can help bring the concepts to our conscious mind).

In his book Meditations on First Philosophy, René Descartes postulates three classifications for our ideas when he says, "Among my ideas, some appear to be innate, some to be adventitious, and others to have been invented by me. My understanding of what a thing is, what truth is, and what thought is, seems to derive simply from my own nature. But my hearing a noise, as I do now, or seeing the sun, or feeling the fire, comes from things which are located outside me, or so I have hitherto judged. Lastly, sirens, hippogriffs and the like are my own invention."

Adventitious ideas are those concepts that we gain through sense experiences, ideas such as the sensation of heat, because they originate from outside sources; transmitting their own likeness rather than something else and something you simply cannot will away. Ideas invented by us, such as those found in mythology, legends and fairy tales, are created by us from other ideas we possess. Lastly, innate ideas, such as our ideas of perfection, are those ideas we have as a result of mental processes that are beyond what experience can directly or indirectly provide.

Gottfried Wilhelm Leibniz defends the idea of innate concepts by suggesting the mind plays a role in determining the nature of concepts, to explain this, he likens the mind to a block of marble in the New Essays on Human Understanding,

This is why I have taken as an illustration a block of veined marble, rather than a wholly uniform block or blank tablets, that is to say what is called tabula rasa in the language of the philosophers. For if the soul were like those blank tablets, truths would be in us in the same way as the figure of Hercules is in a block of marble, when the marble is completely indifferent whether it receives this or some other figure. But if there were veins in the stone which marked out the figure of Hercules rather than other figures, this stone would be more determined thereto, and Hercules would be as it were in some manner innate in it, although labour would be needed to uncover the veins, and to clear them by polishing, and by cutting away what prevents them from appearing. It is in this way that ideas and truths are innate in us, like natural inclinations and dispositions, natural habits or potentialities, and not like activities, although these potentialities are always accompanied by some activities which correspond to them, though they are often imperceptible."

Some philosophers, such as John Locke (who is considered one of the most influential thinkers of the Enlightenment and an empiricist), argue that the Innate Knowledge thesis and the Innate Concept thesis are the same. Other philosophers, such as Peter Carruthers, argue that the two theses are distinct from one another. As with the other theses covered under the umbrella of rationalism, the more types and greater number of concepts a philosopher claims to be innate, the more controversial and radical their position; "the more a concept seems removed from experience and the mental operations we can perform on experience the more plausibly it may be claimed to be innate. Since we do not experience perfect triangles but do experience pains, our concept of the former is a more promising candidate for being innate than our concept of the latter.

== History ==
=== Rationalist philosophy in Western antiquity ===
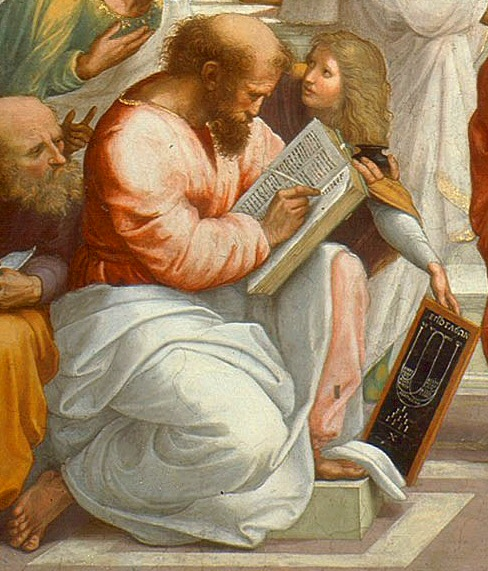
Detail of Pythagoras with a tablet of ratios, numbers sacred to the Pythagoreans, from The School of Athens by Raphael. Vatican Palace, Vatican City

Although rationalism in its modern form post-dates antiquity, philosophers from this time laid down the foundations of rationalism. In particular, the understanding that we may be aware of knowledge available only through the use of rational thought.

==== Pythagoras (570–495 BCE) ====
Pythagoras was one of the first Western philosophers to stress rationalist insight. He is often revered as a great mathematician, mystic and scientist, but he is best known for the Pythagorean theorem, which bears his name, and for discovering the mathematical relationship between the length of strings on lute and the pitches of the notes. Pythagoras "believed these harmonies reflected the ultimate nature of reality. He summed up the implied metaphysical rationalism in the words 'All is number'. It is probable that he had caught the rationalist's vision, later seen by Galileo (1564–1642), of a world governed throughout by mathematically formulable laws". It has been said that he was the first man to call himself a philosopher, or lover of wisdom.

==== Plato (427–347 BCE) ====
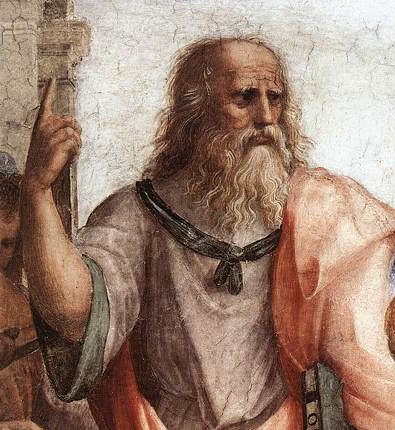
Plato in The School of Athens, by Raphael

Plato held rational insight to a very high standard, as is seen in his works such as Meno and The Republic. He taught on the Theory of Forms (or the Theory of Ideas) which asserts that the highest and most fundamental kind of reality is not the material world of change known to us through sensation, but rather the abstract, non-material (but substantial) world of forms (or ideas). For Plato, these forms were accessible only to reason and not to sense. In fact, it is said that Plato admired reason, especially in geometry, so highly that he had the phrase "Let no one ignorant of geometry enter" inscribed over the door to his academy.

==== Aristotle (384–322 BCE) ====
Aristotle's main contribution to rationalist thinking was the use of syllogistic logic and its use in argument. Aristotle defines syllogism as "a discourse in which certain (specific) things having been supposed, something different from the things supposed results of necessity because these things are so." Despite this very general definition, Aristotle limits himself to categorical syllogisms which consist of three categorical propositions in his work Prior Analytics. These included categorical modal syllogisms.

=== Middle Ages ===
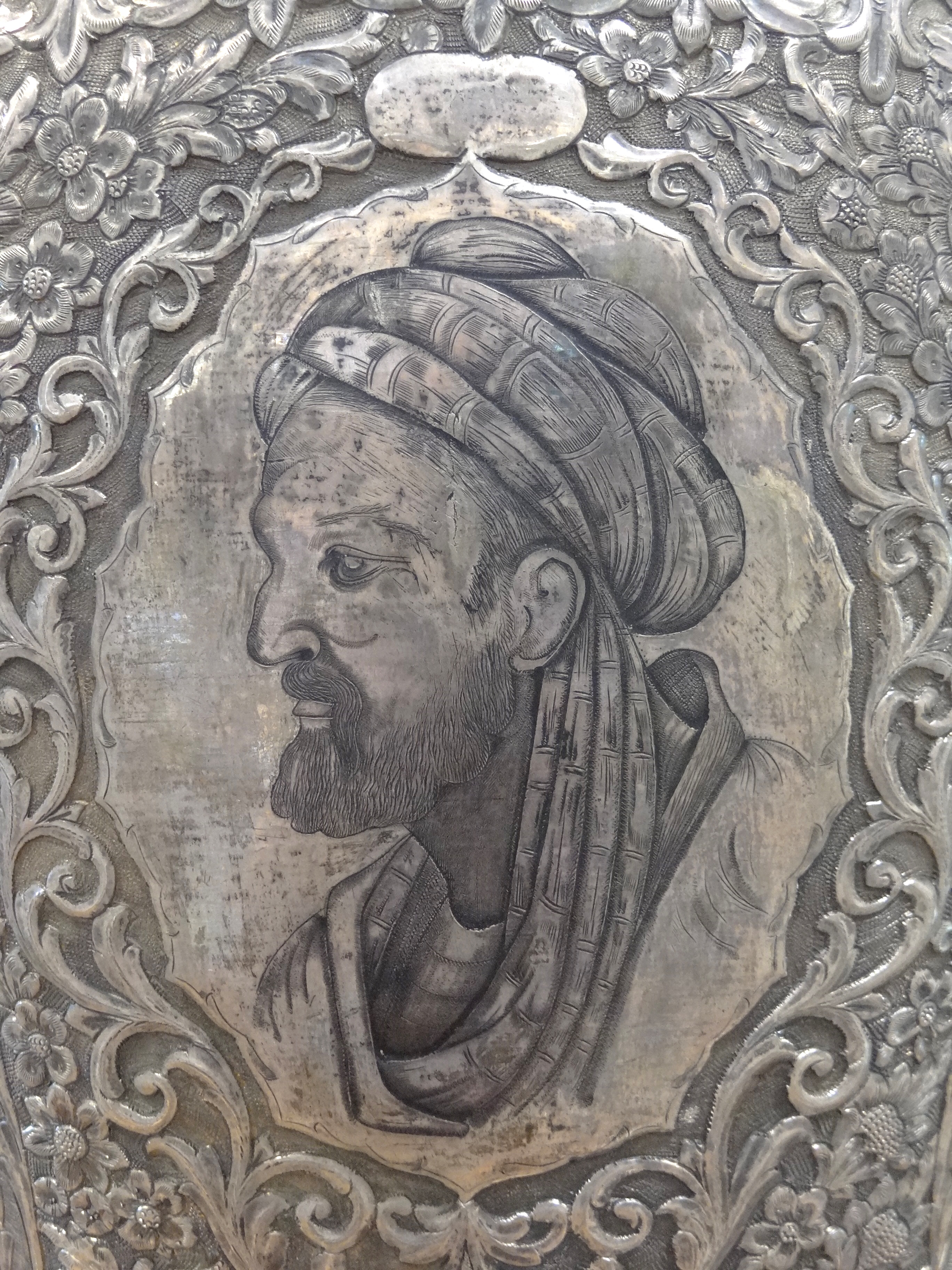
Ibn Sina Portrait on Silver Vase

Although the three great Greek philosophers disagreed with one another on specific points, they all agreed that rational thought could bring to light knowledge that was self-evident – information that humans otherwise could not know without the use of reason. After Aristotle's death, Western rationalistic thought was generally characterized by its application to theology, such as in the works of Augustine, the Islamic philosopher Avicenna (Ibn Sina), Averroes (Ibn Rushd), and Jewish philosopher and theologian Maimonides. The Waldensians sect also incorporated rationalism into their movement. One notable event in the Western timeline was the philosophy of Thomas Aquinas who attempted to merge Greek rationalism and Christian revelation in the thirteenth-century. Generally, the Roman Catholic Church viewed Rationalists as a threat, labeling them as those who "while admitting revelation, reject from the word of God whatever, in their private judgment, is inconsistent with human reason."

=== Classical rationalism ===
==== René Descartes (1596–1650) ====
Descartes was the first of the modern rationalists and has been dubbed the 'Father of Modern Philosophy.' Much subsequent Western philosophy is a response to his writings, which are studied closely to this day.

Descartes thought that only knowledge of eternal truths – including the truths of mathematics, and the epistemological and metaphysical foundations of the sciences – could be attained by reason alone; other knowledge, the knowledge of physics, required experience of the world, aided by the scientific method. He also argued that although dreams appear as real as sense experience, these dreams cannot provide persons with knowledge. Also, since conscious sense experience can be the cause of illusions, then sense experience itself can be doubtable. As a result, Descartes deduced that a rational pursuit of truth should doubt every belief about sensory reality. He elaborated these beliefs in such works as Discourse on the Method, Meditations on First Philosophy, and Principles of Philosophy. Descartes developed a method to attain truths according to which nothing that cannot be recognised by the intellect (or reason) can be classified as knowledge. These truths are gained "without any sensory experience", according to Descartes. Truths that are attained by reason are broken down into elements that intuition can grasp, which, through a purely deductive process, will result in clear truths about reality.

Descartes therefore argued, as a result of his method, that reason alone determined knowledge, and that this could be done independently of the senses. For instance, his famous dictum, cogito ergo sum or "I think, therefore I am", is a conclusion reached a priori i.e., prior to any kind of experience on the matter. The simple meaning is that doubting one's existence, in and of itself, proves that an "I" exists to do the thinking. In other words, doubting one's own doubting is absurd. This was, for Descartes, an irrefutable principle upon which to ground all forms of other knowledge. Descartes posited a metaphysical dualism, distinguishing between the substances of the human body ("res extensa") and the mind or soul ("res cogitans"). This crucial distinction would be left unresolved and lead to what is known as the mind–body problem, since the two substances in the Cartesian system are independent of each other and irreducible.

==== Baruch Spinoza (1632–1677) ====
The philosophy of Baruch Spinoza is a systematic, logical, rational philosophy developed in seventeenth-century Europe. Spinoza's philosophy is a system of ideas constructed upon basic building blocks with an internal consistency with which he tried to answer life's major questions and in which he proposed that "God exists only philosophically." He was heavily influenced by Descartes, Euclid and Thomas Hobbes, as well as theologians in the Jewish philosophical tradition such as Maimonides. But his work was in many respects a departure from the Judeo-Christian-Islamic tradition. Many of Spinoza's ideas continue to vex thinkers today and many of his principles, particularly regarding the emotions, have implications for modern approaches to psychology. To this day, many important thinkers have found Spinoza's "geometrical method" difficult to comprehend: Goethe admitted that he found this concept confusing. His magnum opus, Ethics, contains unresolved obscurities and has a forbidding mathematical structure modeled on Euclid's geometry. Spinoza's philosophy attracted believers such as Albert Einstein and much intellectual attention.

==== Gottfried Leibniz (1646–1716) ====
Leibniz was the last major figure of seventeenth-century rationalism who contributed heavily to other fields such as metaphysics, epistemology, logic, mathematics, physics, jurisprudence, and the philosophy of religion; he is also considered to be one of the last "universal geniuses". He did not develop his system, however, independently of these advances. Leibniz rejected Cartesian dualism and denied the existence of a material world. In Leibniz's view there are infinitely many simple substances, which he called "monads" (which he derived directly from Proclus).

Leibniz developed his theory of monads in response to both Descartes and Spinoza, because the rejection of their visions forced him to arrive at his own solution. Monads are the fundamental unit of reality, according to Leibniz, constituting both inanimate and animate objects. These units of reality represent the universe, though they are not subject to the laws of causality or space (which he called "well-founded phenomena"). Leibniz, therefore, introduced his principle of pre-established harmony to account for apparent causality in the world.

==== Immanuel Kant (1724–1804) ====
Kant is one of the central figures of modern philosophy, and set the terms by which all subsequent thinkers have had to grapple. He argued that human perception structures natural laws, and that reason is the source of morality. His thought continues to hold a major influence in contemporary thought, especially in fields such as metaphysics, epistemology, ethics, political philosophy, and aesthetics.

Kant named his brand of epistemology "Transcendental Idealism", and he first laid out these views in his famous work The Critique of Pure Reason. In it he argued that there were fundamental problems with both rationalist and empiricist dogma. To the rationalists he argued, broadly, that pure reason is flawed when it goes beyond its limits and claims to know those things that are necessarily beyond the realm of every possible experience: the existence of God, free will, and the immortality of the human soul. Kant referred to these objects as "The Thing in Itself" and goes on to argue that their status as objects beyond all possible experience by definition means we cannot know them. To the empiricist, he argued that while it is correct that experience is fundamentally necessary for human knowledge, reason is necessary for processing that experience into coherent thought. He therefore concludes that both reason and experience are necessary for human knowledge. In the same way, Kant also argued that it was wrong to regard thought as mere analysis. "In Kant's views, a priori concepts do exist, but if they are to lead to the amplification of knowledge, they must be brought into relation with empirical data".

=== Contemporary rationalism ===
Rationalism has become a rarer label of philosophers today; rather many different kinds of specialised rationalisms are identified. For example, Robert Brandom has appropriated the terms "rationalist expressivism" and "rationalist pragmatism" as labels for aspects of his programme in Articulating Reasons, and identified "linguistic rationalism", the claim that the contents of propositions "are essentially what can serve as both premises and conclusions of inferences", as a key thesis of Wilfred Sellars.

Outside of academic philosophy, some participants in the internet communities surrounding LessWrong and Slate Star Codex have described themselves as "rationalists" or the "rationalist community" in reference to rationality, rather than rationalism. The term has also been used in this way by critics such as Timnit Gebru.

== Criticism ==
Rationalism was criticized by American psychologist William James for being out of touch with reality. James also criticized rationalism for representing the universe as a closed system, which contrasts with his view that the universe is an open system.

Later in the 20th century, other philosophers utilized an appeal to philosophical wisdom to warn against the dangers associated with attempts to adopt rationalism as a universal epistemological standardard. Included among them were Lewis White Beck, who cited a reductio ad absurdum argument against the exclusive use of rationalism to explain human behvaior by noting that all such attempts are by their very nature "self-stultifying" and should be accompanied by a "self-exemption clause." Others, such as Colin Murray Turbayne objected to rationalism on epistemological grounds by noting that even "objective" mechanistic theories of the natural world rely upon subjective dead conceptual metaphors, which over time have contributed to widespread philosophical confusion since their introduction by Rene Descartes and Isaac Newton. Other philosophers such as Richard Clyde Taylor have questioned whether scientific rationalism or determinism can properly serve as a generalized ontological explanation of human behavior on the grounds that the "certainty" associated with such "cold" intellectual conceptions precludes any reference to the utilization of "understanding" or "love" as a motivation for the exercise of humanity's free will. According to this objection, rationalism may provide useful intellectual paradigms based upon knowledge of the natural world but is limited in its universal application because philosophical wisdom dictates that "the fruit of metaphysical thought is not knowledge but understanding."

Proponents of emotional choice theory criticize rationalism by drawing on new findings from emotion research in psychology and neuroscience. They point out that the rationalist paradigm is generally based on the assumption that decision-making is a conscious and reflective process based on thoughts and beliefs. It presumes that people decide on the basis of calculation and deliberation. However, cumulative research in neuroscience suggests that only a small part of the brain's activities operate at the level of conscious reflection. The vast majority of its activities consist of unconscious appraisals and emotions. The significance of emotions in decision-making has generally been ignored by rationalism, according to these critics. Moreover, emotional choice theorists contend that the rationalist paradigm has difficulty incorporating emotions into its models, because it cannot account for the social nature of emotions. Even though emotions are felt by individuals, psychologists and sociologists have shown that emotions cannot be isolated from the social environment in which they arise. Emotions are inextricably intertwined with people's social norms and identities, which are typically outside the scope of standard rationalist accounts. Emotional choice theory seeks to capture not only the social but also the physiological and dynamic character of emotions. It represents a unitary action model to organize, explain, and predict the ways in which emotions shape decision-making.

== See also ==
- 17th-century philosophy
- Critical rationalism
- Emotional choice theory
- Historical criticism
- Humanism
- Idealism
- Innatism
- Irrationalism
- Logical truth
- Natural philosophy
- Nominalism
- Noology
- Objectivism
- Objectivity (philosophy)
- Objectivity (science)
- Pancritical rationalism
- Panrationalism
- Phenomenology (philosophy)
- Philosophical realism
- Platonic realism
- Positivism
- Psychological nativism
- Rational choice theory
- Rational expectations
- Rational mysticism
- Rational realism
- Rationality and Power
- Realistic rationalism
- Pluralistic rationalism
- Scientific rationalism
- Theistic rationalism

== Sources ==
=== Primary ===
- Descartes, René (1637), Discourse on the Method.
- Spinoza, Baruch (1677), Ethics.
- Leibniz, Gottfried (1714), Monadology.
- Kant, Immanuel (1781/1787), Critique of Pure Reason.

=== Secondary ===
- Audi, Robert (ed., 1999), The Cambridge Dictionary of Philosophy, Cambridge University Press, Cambridge, 1995. 2nd edition, 1999.
- Baird, Forrest E.; Walter Kaufmann (2008). From Plato to Derrida. Upper Saddle River, NJ: Pearson Prentice Hall. ISBN 978-0131585911.
- Blackburn, Simon (1996), The Oxford Dictionary of Philosophy, Oxford University Press, Oxford, 1994. Paperback edition with new Chronology, 1996.
- Bourke, Vernon J. (1962), "Rationalism", p. 263 in Runes (1962).
- Douglas, Alexander X.: Spinoza and Dutch Cartesianism: Philosophy and Theology. (Oxford: Oxford University Press, 2015)
- Fischer, Louis (1997). The Life of Mahatma Gandhi. HarperCollins. pp. 306–307. ISBN 0006388876.
- Förster, Eckart; Melamed, Yitzhak Y. (eds.): Spinoza and German Idealism. (Cambridge: Cambridge University Press, 2012)
- Fraenkel, Carlos; Perinetti, Dario; Smith, Justin E. H. (eds.): The Rationalists: Between Tradition and Innovation. (Dordrecht: Springer, 2011)
- Hampshire, Stuart: Spinoza and Spinozism. (Oxford: Clarendon Press; New York: Oxford University Press, 2005)
- Huenemann, Charles; Gennaro, Rocco J. (eds.): New Essays on the Rationalists. (New York: Oxford University Press, 1999)
- Lacey, A.R. (1996), A Dictionary of Philosophy, 1st edition, Routledge and Kegan Paul, 1976. 2nd edition, 1986. 3rd edition, Routledge, London, 1996.
- Loeb, Louis E.: From Descartes to Hume: Continental Metaphysics and the Development of Modern Philosophy. (Ithaca, New York: Cornell University Press, 1981)
- Nyden-Bullock, Tammy: Spinoza's Radical Cartesian Mind. (Continuum, 2007)
- Pereboom, Derk (ed.): The Rationalists: Critical Essays on Descartes, Spinoza, and Leibniz. (Lanham, MD: Rowman & Littlefield, 1999)
- Phemister, Pauline: The Rationalists: Descartes, Spinoza and Leibniz. (Malden, MA: Polity Press, 2006)
- Runes, Dagobert D. (ed., 1962), Dictionary of Philosophy, Littlefield, Adams, and Company, Totowa, NJ.
- Strazzoni, Andrea: Dutch Cartesianism and the Birth of Philosophy of Science: A Reappraisal of the Function of Philosophy from Regius to 's Gravesande, 1640–1750. (Berlin: De Gruyter, 2018)
- Verbeek, Theo: Descartes and the Dutch: Early Reactions to Cartesian Philosophy, 1637–1650. (Carbondale: Southern Illinois University Press, 1992)
