= Credibility thesis =

The credibility thesis is a proposed heterodox theoretical framework for understanding how societal institutions or social rules come about and evolve. It posits that institutions emerge from intentional institution-building but never in the originally intended form. Instead, institutional development is endogenous and spontaneously ordered and institutional persistence can be explained by their credibility, which is provided by the function that particular institutions serve rather than their theoretical or ideological form. The credibility thesis can be applied to explain, for example, why purported institutional improvements do not take hold as part of structural adjustment programs, while other economies in the developing world deliver growth despite absence of clear and strong market mechanisms such as indisputable private property rights or clearly delineated and registered land tenure. The thesis has been applied to explain the failure and success of institutional reforms for various sectors and property rights, including but not limited to, land, housing, informal housing and slums, natural resources, climate change policy and environmental policy.

== Postulates of the credibility thesis ==
According to the credibility thesis, institutional persistence, meaning the survival and change of particular institutions through time is determined by the function of the institution and actors' expectations of the institution to play that function. The Credibility Thesis has put forward "that what ultimately determines the performance of institutions is not their form in terms of formality, privatization, or security, but their spatially and temporally defined function. In different wording, institutional function presides over form; the former can be expressed by its credibility, that is, the perceived social support at a given time and space." Or, as Pero and Smith phrased "institutional credibility refers to peoples' acceptance of an institution based on their perceptions of that institutions' accountability, representation, legitimacy, transparency, fairness and justice."

In light of the above, the thesis predicts that institutions that persist over time likely are credible, thus functional. If not, they would have changed or gone extinct. This principle holds for whatever form an institution may assume, regardless whether it is formal or informal, public or private, secure or insecure. A typical example is sharecropping, which has been regarded as economically inefficient or "second-best". However, its persistence throughout the ages has challenged this premise, leading others to conclude that it is efficient, thus credible and functional. That credibility has been confirmed in other studies. In this context, Fan et al. noted: "Compared with other institutional theories, the credibility thesis places more emphasis on the function of the institution. (…) The credibility thesis explains successfully why some seemingly imperfect institutions, even without clear property rights, have persisted and been championed, while other seemingly perfect institutions have had poor operation effects."

Changes in institutional arrangements, such as changes from informal land tenure and informal housing to a formalized real estate market or gradually declining prevalence of formal marriage or customary rights, are brought about by rule-making in a multi-actor playing field, where even the strongest actors cannot fully dictate institutional arrangements. In effect, when powerful actors exogenously impose institutions that contradict the evolutionary flow of endogenously emerged functions, the newly designed arrangements will invariably develop into "empty institutions" and "non credible" institutions.

An institution that appears stable and unchanging over time is often alleged to exist in an equilibrium wherein actors' conflicting interests on what form the institution should take are locked in a frozen conflict. For example, whether land holdings should be registered in a cadastre or if informal exchange of payment for use rights can suffice as confirmation of a land sale, constitute two possible institutional arrangements and either can be beneficial to different actors' interests. That no actor perceives an immediate opportunity to change the arrangement to their advantage is a sign of the credibility of the assignment and the source of the equilibrium of institutional arrangement. However, in actuality disequilibrium characterises institutional arrangements and equilibrium is transitory and rare. What is perceived as persistence of institutions is, in fact, the occurrence of infinitesimally small institutional changes over time under a veneer of apparent stability. In this context, the credibility thesis is predicated upon the notion of dynamic disequilibrium. It is also why in this respect the credibility theory is juxtaposed to structural functionalism, which is based on presupposed equilibrium.

A series of underlying postulates for the credibility thesis has been proposed:

- Institutions are the resultant of unintentional development. Although actors have intentions, there is no agency that can externally or exogenously design institutions, as actors' actions are part of the same endogenous game. Institutions emerge as an unanticipated outcome of actors' multitudinous interactions, in effect, are the result of an autonomous, Unintended Intentionality.
- Institutional change is driven by disequilibrium. Contrary to the notion that institutions settle around equilibrium, actors' interactions are seen as an ever-changing and conflicting process in which stable status is never reached. One could see it as a "Dynamic Disequilibrium" or institutional change as perpetual alteration, yet, with alternating speeds of change; sometimes, imperceptibly slow, sometimes, sudden and with shocks.
- Institutional Form is subordinate to Function. In other words, functional adaptation as evident through the use and disuse of institutions over time and space is what matters for understanding their role in development, not their appearance.

== Key concepts ==
Term	Definition	Example
Credibility	Perceived social support of an institutional arrangement at a given time and space; a measure of individual actors' aggregate perceptions of an institution as a jointly shared arrangement	Informal settlements and extra-legal housing that provide non-state social welfare for low-income residents.
Institutional function	The use that a particular institutional arrangement can provide to actors.	In the agricultural economy, land is a primary asset from a subsistence point of view: it provides food security, enables utilization of family labour, and reduces vulnerability The agricultural lease system in China functions as a social welfare net for the vast surplus of China's rural labour.
Empty institution	"[Institutional] compromises over sensitive political issues. The interests opposed to them ensure that they are established in such a way that they cannot achieve their aims, whereas the interests supporting them win a pyrrhic victory as their rules, as represented by the new institution, have no practical impact on social actors' behaviour".	Vilhelm Aubert observed that the Housemaid Law in Norway regulating the working conditions of domestic workers in Norway was on the books and technically being implemented but had not any effect.
Non-credible institution	An institution that is being enforced by a powerful actor, complied by but not accepted by others.	Expropriation of customary Native Title for dam-building and privatization of common property of indigenous peoples in Malaysia. Evictions of peasants and urban citizens in China.
Dynamic disequilibrium	Contrary to the concept that institutions settle around equilibrium, actors' interactions are defined as an ever-changing and conflicting process in which a stable status is never achieved. It will be proposed … as a Theorem on "Dynamic Disequilibrium": institutional change as a process of perpetual alteration, however, by which the pace of change varies; at times imperceptibly slow, and at other times, sudden and with shocks.	"[O]ngoing subtle shifts beneath the surface of apparently stable formal institutions."
Institutional form	The categorical description of institutional arrangements.	Secure, private, formal as opposed to fuzzy, common, and customary property rights.

== Methodological approaches ==
Nail house
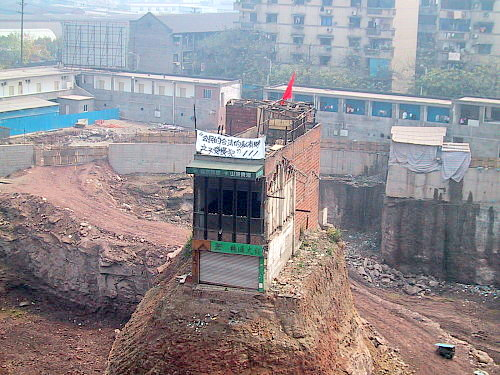
- Conflicting interests over how institutions should be arranged drive institutional design such as the limits to refuse to vacate condemned property, such as this nail house in Chongqing in 2007 or another in Rotterdam in 2018.

"Given that all involved actors are constantly interested in changing institutional design, credibility cannot be measured by directly asking respondents whether they find an institution credible.

Instead it has to be operationalized through proxies, such as the level of conflict that an institution generates, the extent of 'institutional robustness' expressed as a function of institutional lifespan and flexibility, the degree to which an institution facilitates or frustrates overall socio-economic, political and cultural change, and the extent to which an institution fulfils the functions it ought to perform in the eyes of social actors."

Such opening of the black box of institutions is possible using mixed methods to describe institutions in detail over time and space, which serves as an archaeology of institutions. The archaeology of institutions can be understood as "an approach by which the change of institutions is meticulously recorded, interpreted and studied through the collection of data from every possible source, regardless of whether that is socio-economic, historical, ethno-anthropological, geographical, psychological or legal-political." An example of this, is the history of China's titling and housing ownership.

While predominantly applied to land-related institutions, this approach could be applied to analysis of other means of production, such as capital (e.g. banks and industries), labor (trade unions) or beyond (water management and notaries).

The proxies that can be used to measure credibility include the following:

- Actors' aggregate perceptions of institutions, which can be operationalized according to the FAT Institutional Framework (in other words, an assessment of Formal, Actual and Targeted institutions);
- Actors' aggregate perceptions of conflict generated by institutions in terms of "incidence, frequency, intensity (e.g., measured in terms of economic costs), the length (in time), and the nature (e.g., violent/non-violent)";
- Speed of institutional change through an institutional archaeology of temporal changes in the formal property rights structure.

When credibility is assessed through these proxies, a better sense can be obtained of the current function that institutions fulfil for a group of actors. In result, one is likely better positioned to predict institutional interventions that might rally social support. Depending on the level of credibility, these can be envisioned as positioned on a gradient from condoning or non-intervention to co-opting, facilitating, prohibiting and ordaining.

The CSI Checklist (Credibility Scales and Intervention) was developed for this purpose.

Credibility level / trend	Institutional intervention	Desired effect
High	Condoning	Accepting praxis by non-intervention
Medium high	Co-opting	Formalizing what is done
Neutral	Facilitating	Supporting what needs to be done
Medium low	Prohibiting	Dictating what shall not be done
Low	Ordaining	Commanding what must be done

Apart from studying credibility in real-life situations, the particular premises of the theory – endogeneity, dis-equilibrium, and functional adaptation – make it also suitable for simulation in agent-based models.

== Emergence and reception of the theory ==
The question of credibility first emerged along with concern about certain institutional interventions failing. In the mid-20th century Vilhelm Aubert noted that the Housemaid Law in Norway had been implemented but flaunted by all involved actors. The concept of credibility was initially coined as an explanandum for the success and failure of Western monetary, anti-inflationary policies in the 1970s. A concern for the credibility of policy emerged in the latter half of the 20th century in response to frequently observed failures of neoliberal structural adjustments in the developing world associated with the Washington Consensus. Institutional reform, such as privatization, failed to deliver the predicted economic growth, not because of lacking credible commitment on part of actors but due to the absence of endogenous credibility. For this reason, Grabel noted that "credibility is always secured endogenously (. . .) rather than exogenously by virtue of the epistemological status of the theory that promotes it."

In contrast, the growth of the Chinese economy despite lack of many institutions considered to be essential for economic growth indicated that institutional arrangements do not necessarily determine economic outcomes, and also at the same time economic development does not automatically lead to teleologically predetermined institutional forms. This has been particularly striking in the case of real estate sector in China. In this context, there is a growing body of research suggesting one should focus on the circular cumulative causation aspects of function or quality of institutional performance rather than their form. As noted by Ha-Joon Chang: "a big problem that dogs the current orthodox literature on development is its inability to clearly distinguish between the forms and functions of institutions."

The term credibility thesis was put forth by Peter Ho in 2014. In a review of the credibility thesis, Delilah Griswold contended that "credibility is a powerful metric by which to understand and evaluate tenure systems. Importantly, understanding the credibility of a given institution requires analysis outside of theory and politics, analysis that is locally and temporally specific and multilayered." Benjamin Davy described it as a "rallying call of function presides over form" which "takes a fresh approach to credibility, land policy, and property theory. Initially developed with regard to land policy in main-land China, the credibility of property rights is also interesting from the perspective of Western property theory." George Lin deemed the thesis "inspirational, innovative, and provocative with great potentials to advance theoretical inquiry into the intriguing nature of China's developmental model in a rapidly changing world." The theoretical and methodological groundwork on the credibility thesis was awarded with the William Kapp Prize by the European Association for Evolutionary Political Economy.

== Application ==
The credibility thesis was developed to explain the apparent contradiction between China's insecure land tenure and the support it rallied by farmers. Since the Household Contract Responsibility System replaced collective farming of the People's Communes in the mid-1980s, farm households are allowed to lease agricultural land up to 30 years. Although the security of the lease is protected by law, the contracted land has been subjected to frequent reallocations by the village collective in response to demographic changes. Markedly, studies have found a high support for the land reallocations – and thus, an insecure tenure – by the majority of the farmers. This finding has been confirmed in consecutive research over three decades since the early 1990s.

In the years after it was mooted, the credibility thesis has been applied to various sectors and resources, including land, slums and informal settlements, affordable and commercial housing, grasslands, forests, mineral resources, water management, apartment and strata rights, customary land rights, climate and environmental policy, and issues of urbanization and planning. In addition, the thesis has also been used to explain property rights changes of labor markets, intellectual property rights and technology, and financial institutions.

The contributions of these studies to the understanding of institutions relate to:

1) Falsifying the relation between form and performance. Research has demonstrated that private, formal, and secure institutions may fail to deliver on their predicted positive performance. Contrarily, other research has ascertained that public, informal, and insecure property rights are not economically inefficient, but functional and credible.

2) Advancing the methodology and measurement of credibility, such as through refinement of the FAT Institutional Framework in relation to socio-ecological systems; development of the Conflict Analysis Model; and calculation of endogenous transaction costs as a measure of credibility;

3) Assessing the functions of institutions, such as for political influence, social welfare, sustainability, the catering for traditional markets, and social cohesion.

4) Examining conditions for diminishing credibility due to the imposition of institutional arrangements on hitherto credible property rights.

== See also ==
- Emergence
- Endogeneity
- Spontaneous order
- Lamarckism (the use and disuse of function determines the persistence, change or disappearance of institutions)
- Circular cumulative causation
- Form follows function (Architecture)

Related theories and theoretical bodies

- General disequilibrium
- Heterodox economics, Neo-Marxism, and Evolutionary economics
- Institutional economics
- Thorstein Veblen and John R. Commons
