= Henry Dunning Macleod =

Scottish economist (1821–1902)

- Born: 31 March 1821; Edinburgh, Scotland
- Died: 16 July 1902 (aged 81); Norwood, London
- Resting place: Norwood Cemetery
- Occupations: Barrister (Inner Temple); Banker (Royal British Bank)
- Spouse: Elizabeth Mackenzie (m. 1853)
- Parent(s): Roderick Macleod, 4th of Cadboll (father); Isabella Cunninghame (mother)

Academic background
- Education: Eton; Edinburgh University, and Trinity College, Cambridge

Academic work
- Discipline: Commercial law Political Economy; Economics
- Notable ideas: Coined the term "Gresham's law"

Henry Dunning Macleod (31 March 1821 – 16 July 1902) was a Scottish economist and lawyer.

== Life ==
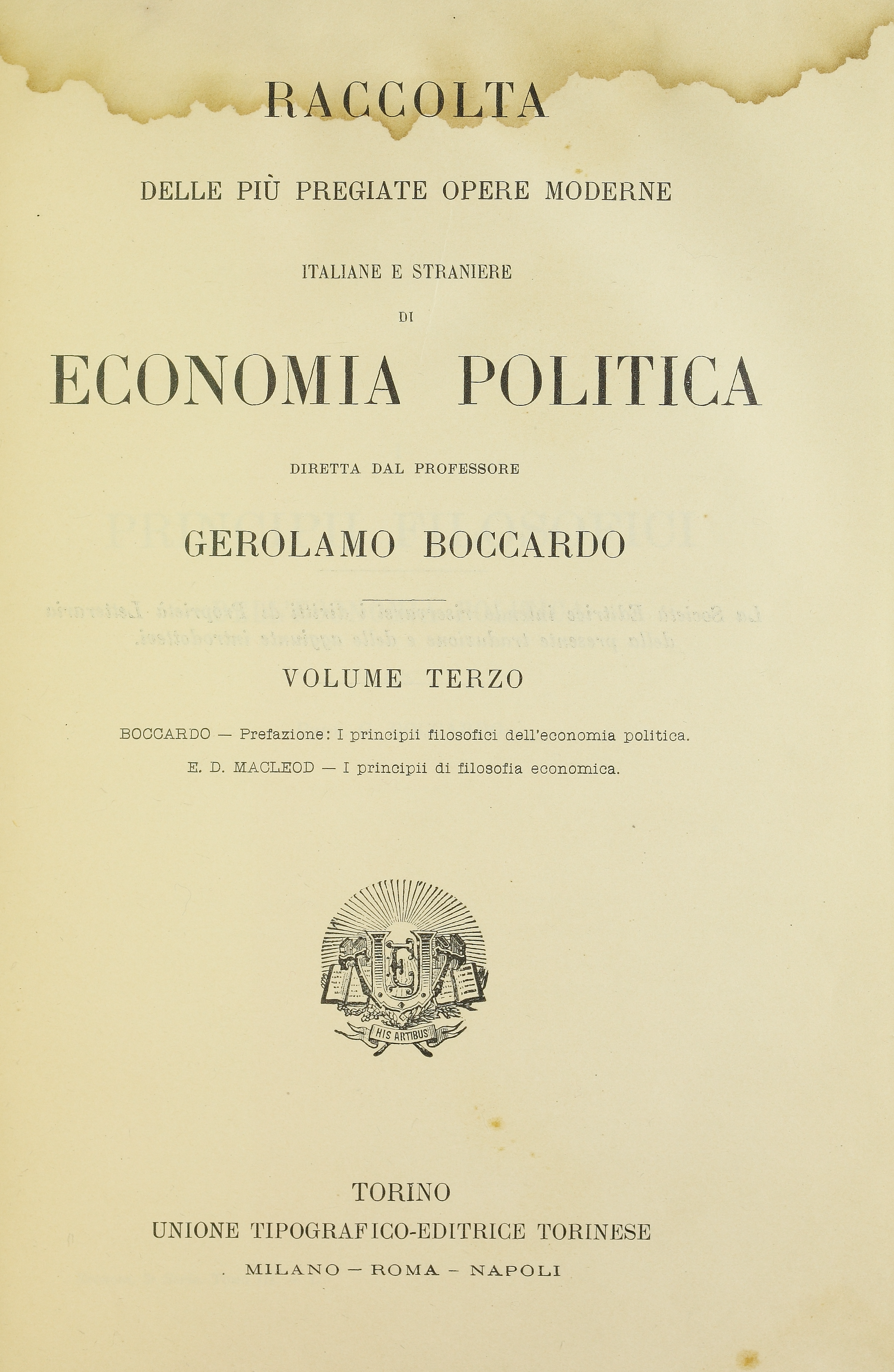
Italian translation of Elements of political economy, 1877

Henry Dunning Macleod was born in Edinburgh, and educated at Eton, Edinburgh University, and Trinity College, Cambridge, where he graduated in 1843. In 1843 Macleod was entered as a student at Inner Temple, travelled in Europe, and in 1849 was called to the English bar.

Macleod was a director of the Royal British Bank, after the failure of which he was one of those convicted of conspiracy to misrepresent the bank's financial position, and was sentenced to 3 months imprisonment.

He was employed in Scotland on the work of poor-law reform, and devoted himself to the study of economics. In 1856 he published his Theory and Practice of Banking, in 1858 Elements of Political Economy, and in 1859 A Dictionary of Political Economy. In 1873 his Principles of Economical Philosophy appeared, and in 1889 his The Theory of Credit. Between 1868 and 1870 he was employed by the government in digesting and codifying the law of bills of exchange. In 1896, he published The History of Economics.

== Contributions ==
Macleod's principal contribution to the study of economics consists in his work on the theory of credit, to which he was the first to give due prominence. A major feature of his work was to create a theory of money starting from a theory of credit instead of the usual reverse path. In The Theory of Credit he says:

Money and Credit are essentially of the same nature: Money being only the highest and most general form of Credit

Macleod's Credit Theory of Money influenced Alfred Mitchell-Innes and later work of the modern Chartalists. John R. Commons considered Macleod's work to be the foundation of Institutional economics.

In his 1954 History of Economic Analysis, Joseph Schumpeter mentions Macleod:

The English leaders from Thornton to Mill did explore the credit structure, and in doing so made discoveries that constitute their chief contributions to monetary analysis but could not be adequately stated in terms of the monetary theory of credit. But they failed to go through with the theoretical implications of these discoveries, that is, to build up a systematic credit theory of money...

Then, he adds a footnote:

We might see the outlines of such a theory in the works of Macleod. But they remained so completely outside of the pale of recognized economics...

Then, Schumpeter concludes:

Henry Dunning Macleod [...] was an economist of many merits who somehow failed to achieve recognition, or even to be taken quite seriously, owing to his inability to put his many good ideas in a professionally acceptable form.

It was Macleod who coined in 1857 the term "Gresham's law" (stated simply as: "Bad money drives out good").

For a judicious discussion of the value of Macleod's writings, see an article on "The Revolt against Orthodox Economics" in the Quarterly Review for October 1901 (no. 388).

== Bibliography ==
- Macleod, Henry Dunning (1855). The Theory and Practice of Banking. Longman, Brown, Green, and Longmans.
- Macleod, Henry Dunning. (1858). The Elements of Banking. Longmans.
- Macleod, Henry Dunning (1859). A Dictionary of Political Economy, Longman, Brown, Green, and Longmans.
- Macleod, Henry Dunning (1873). Principles of Economical Philosophy, Longmans, Green, Reader, and Dyer.
- Macleod, Henry Dunning (1889). Theory of Credit, Longmans, Green, and Company.
- Macleod, Henry Dunning (1896). The History of Economics. London: Bliss, Sands and Co.

== See also ==
- List of multiple discoveries
- A History of Banking in all the Leading Nations (1896), to which Macleod contributed the chapters in vol. 2 on the history of banking in Great Britain.
- Catallactics
