= Royal British Bank v Turquand =

British company law case

Royal British Bank v Turquands
- (1856) 6 E&B 327
- Court: Court of Exchequer

Court membership
- Judge sitting: Lord Jervis CJ

Keywords
- Ostensible authority, indoor management rule

Royal British Bank v Turquand (1856) 6 E&B 327 is a UK company law case that held people transacting with companies are entitled to assume that internal company rules are complied with, even if they are not. This "indoor management rule" or the "Rule in Turquand's Case" is applicable in most of the common law world. It originally mitigated the harshness of the constructive notice doctrine, and in the UK it is now supplemented by the Companies Act 2006 sections 39-41.

== Facts ==
Mr Turquand was the official manager (liquidator) of the insolvent Cameron's Coalbrook Steam, Coal and Swansea and Loughor Railway Company. It was incorporated under the Joint Stock Companies Act 1844. The company had given a bond for £2,000 to the Royal British Bank, which secured the company's drawings on its current account. The bond was under the company's seal, signed by two directors and the secretary. When the company was sued, it alleged that under its registered deed of settlement (the articles of association), directors only had the power to borrow up to an amount authorised by a company resolution. A resolution had been passed but did not specify how much the directors could borrow.

== Judgment ==
Sir John Jervis CJ, for the Court of Exchequer Chamber ruled that the bond was valid, so the Royal British Bank could enforce the terms. He said the bank was deemed to be aware that the directors could borrow only up to the amount resolutions allowed. Articles of association were registered with Companies House, so there was constructive notice. But the bank could not be deemed to know which ordinary resolutions passed, because these were not registrable. The bond was valid because there was no requirement to look into the company's internal workings. This is the indoor management rule, that the company's indoor affairs are the company's problem. Jervis CJ gave the judgment of the Court.

I am of opinion that the judgment of the Court of Queen's Bench ought to be affirmed. I incline to think that the question which has been principally argued both here and in that Court does not necessarily arise, and need not be determined. My impression is (though I will not state it as a fixed opinion) that the resolution set forth in the replication [332] goes far enough to satisfy the requisites of the deed of settlement. The deed allows the directors to borrow on bond such sum or sums of money as shall from time to time, by a resolution passed at a general meeting of the Company, be authorized to be borrowed: and the replication shews a resolution, passed at a general meeting, authorizing the directors to borrow on bond such sums for such periods and at such rates of interest as they might deem expedient, in accordance with the deed of settlement and the Act of Parliament; but the resolution does not otherwise define the amount to be borrowed. That seems to me enough. If that be so, the other question does not arise. But whether it be so or not we need not decide; for it seems to us that the plea, whether we consider it as a confession and avoidance or a special Non est factum, does not raise any objection to this advance as against the Company. We may now take for granted that the dealings with these companies are not like dealings with other partnerships, and that the parties dealing with them are bound to read the statute and the deed of settlement. But they are not bound to do more. And the party here, on reading the deed of settlement, would find, not a prohibition from borrowing, but a permission to do so on certain conditions. Finding that the authority might be made complete by a resolution, he would have a right to infer the fact of a resolution authorizing that which on the face of the document appeared to be legitimately done.

Pollock CB, Alderson B, Cresswell J, Crowder J and Bramwell B concurred.

== Significance ==
The rule in Turquand's case was not accepted as being firmly entrenched in law until it was endorsed by the House of Lords. In Mahony v East Holyford Mining Co Lord Hatherly phrased the law thus:

When there are persons conducting the affairs of the company in a manner which appears to be perfectly consonant with the articles of association, those so dealing with them externally are not to be affected by irregularities which may take place in the internal management of the company.

So, in Mahoney, where the company's articles provided that cheques should be signed by any two of the three named directors and by the secretary, the fact that the directors who had signed the cheques had never been properly appointed was held to be a matter of internal management, and the third parties who received those cheques were entitled to presume that the directors had been properly appointed, and cash the cheques.

The position in English law is now superseded by section 40 of the Companies Act 2006, but the Rule in Turquand's Case is still applied throughout many common law jurisdictions in the Commonwealth. According to the Turquand rule, each outsider contracting with a company in good faith is entitled to assume that the internal requirements and procedures have been complied with. The company will consequently be bound by the contract even if the internal requirements and procedures have not been complied with. The exceptions here are: if the outsider was aware of the fact that the internal requirements and procedures have not been complied with (acted in bad faith); or if the circumstances under which the contract was concluded on behalf of the company were suspicious.

However, it is sometimes possible for an outsider to ascertain whether an internal requirement or procedure has been complied with. If it is possible to ascertain this fact from the company's public documents, the doctrine of disclosure and the doctrine of constructive notice will apply and not the Turquand rule. The Turquand rule was formulated to keep an outsider's duty to inquire into the affairs of a company within reasonable bounds, but if the compliance or non-compliance with an internal requirement can be ascertained from the company's public documents, the doctrine of disclosure and the doctrine of constructive notice will apply. If it is an internal requirement that a certain act should be approved by a special resolution, the Turquand rule will therefore not apply in relation to that specific act, since a special resolution is registered with Companies House (in the United Kingdom), and is deemed to be public information.

== See also ==
- United Kingdom company law
- Constructive notice
