= Pancritical rationalism =

Theory developed by William Warren Bartley

Pancritical rationalism (literally "criticism of all things", from pan-, "all", also known as PCR), also called comprehensively critical rationalism (CCR), is a development of critical rationalism and panrationalism originated by William Warren Bartley in his book The Retreat to Commitment. PCR attempts to work around the problem of ultimate commitment or infinite regress by decoupling criticism and justification. A pancritical rationalist holds all positions open to criticism, including PCR itself. Such a position in principle never resorts to appeal to authority for justification of stances, since all authorities are held to be intrinsically fallible.
