= Royal British Bank =

British joint-stock bank (1849–1856)

The Royal British Bank was a British joint-stock bank, established under a Royal Charter in 1849, that collapsed in 1856. This caused a scandal. The circumstances were described by The Economist as "an extraordinary example of the little trouble the public take to think for themselves".

The bank's main founders were John MacGregor, a Member of Parliament for Glasgow, and Edward Mullins, a solicitor. After difficulties in raising the necessary capital, the bank was launched in 1849.

After press articles alleging substantial losses appeared in 1856, the share price dropped and in September 1856 the bank suspended operations after experiencing a run, leaving 6,000 depositors owed money.

It then became apparent that various directors and former directors had taken substantial sums from the bank, though most of the directors in post at the time of the collapse had not done so.

The eight surviving directors—among them Henry Dunning Macleod—were put on trial in February 1858. (The bank's founder, MacGregor, had fled to France and died there in 1857.) They were tried for conspiracy to defraud the bank's customers at the Court of Queen's Bench before the Lord Chief Justice, Lord Campbell. On the first day of the trial, the Prince of Wales attended and sat on the bench next to the Lord Chief Justice. The jury found each of the defendants guilty of the charges and they were given sentences ranging from a nominal fine of one shilling to imprisonment for up to one year. By July 1858, however, only one of the convicted, the former manager of the bank, and arguably the least influential person among the convicted, remained in prison; the contrast with the treatment of the directors in the City of Glasgow Bank collapse is perhaps instructive.

The collapse gave rise to a new legislation tightening banking regulation, including the publication of balance sheets and the auditing of accounts.

== See also ==
- Royal British Bank v Turquand
