= Werner Erhard (book) =

Book by W.W. Bartley, III

- 1978 Edition
- Author: William Warren Bartley
- Language: English
- Genre: Biography
- Publisher: Clarkson Potter
- Publication date: 1978
- Publication place: United States
- Media type: Print (Hardback)
- Pages: 279
- ISBN: 0-517-53502-5
- OCLC: 3892730
- Dewey Decimal: 158 B
- LC Class: RC339.52.E7 B37 1978

Werner Erhard: The Transformation of a Man, The Founding of est is a biography of Werner Erhard by philosophy professor William Warren Bartley, III. The book was published in 1978 by Clarkson Potter. Bartley was a graduate of Erhard Seminars Training and served on its advisory board. Erhard wrote a foreword to the book. The book's structure describes Erhard's education, transformation, reconnection with his family, and the theories of the est training.

The book went through five editions in its first year. Reviewers generally commented that the book was favorable to Erhard, and a number of critics felt that it was unduly so, or lacked objectivity, citing Bartley's close relationship to Erhard. Responses to the writing were mixed; while some reviewers found it well written and entertaining, others felt the tone was too slick, promotional, or hagiographic.

== Background ==
This biography tells Werner Erhard's early life story and the creation of the est Training which he designed to provide people with access to their own transformational experience.

Werner Erhard (born John Paul Rosenberg), a California-based former salesman, training manager and executive in the encyclopedia business, created the Erhard Seminars Training (est) course in 1971. est was a form of Large Group Awareness Training, and was part of the Human Potential Movement. est was a four-day, 60-hour self-help program given to groups of 250 people at a time. The program was very intensive. Participants were taught that they were responsible for their life outcomes.

est was widely ridiculed in the popular press and aroused a great deal of controversy.

In 1985, Werner Erhard and Associates repackaged the course as "The Forum", a seminar focused on "goal-oriented breakthroughs".

In the early 1990s Erhard faced family problems, as well as tax problems that were eventually resolved in his favor. In 1991 a group of his associates formed the company Landmark Education, purchasing The Forum's course "technology" from Erhard.

== Author ==
William Warren Bartley, III, professor of philosophy at California State University, Hayward from 1973, prior to writing his biography on Erhard, had authored The Retreat to Commitment (1962), on the epistemology of Sir Karl Popper; Wittgenstein (1973), a biography of the philosopher Ludwig Wittgenstein; edited (1977) Lewis Carroll's Symbolic Logic of 1896; and authored a book titled Morality and Religion (1971). Bartley was first introduced to and referred to est in March 1972 by a doctor whom he had consulted about his nine-year struggle with insomnia. As a result of his experience in the est training his insomnia was cured. He then became very involved in the est organization, and served for several years as the company's philosophical consultant. He received payments of over US$30,000 in this capacity during the two years he spent writing the book. He also served on the "Advisory Board" of est. Bartley interviewed a number of individuals who were involved in his subject's life and made use of quotations from a wide array of sources. Bartley commented on his subject in an article on the book in The Evening Independent, stating: "He's not a huckster, although he's a great salesman. I think he's a very good man, a very important man. ... He's a fascinating man. People are interested in him."

== Contents ==
Life story

The book recounts how Erhard's childhood events, job positions and self-education led to the development of the est training. Born Jack Rosenberg, Erhard was an inquisitive child who was close to his mother. In his student years, he read profusely and earned superior grades. As a teenager, Erhard experienced both conflicts with his mother and a growing dissatisfaction with his life. Shortly after graduating from high school he married his girlfriend Pat Campbell, who had become pregnant. Instead of pursuing his plans for higher education, he took on a variety of jobs including meat-packing, heating and plumbing, estimating and selling cars. By the age of 21, Erhard had become the top car salesman at the dealership he worked for. By the time he was 25, Erhard and his wife had four children and he was feeling increasingly restless and constrained. He formed a friendship with a woman named June Bryde, which gradually deepened into an affair. He secretly arranged a flight from Philadelphia, Pennsylvania with June in 1960, leaving behind his wife and their four children, who would not hear from him for twelve years. The couple settled for a time in St Louis, and it was at this time that he changed his name to Werner Erhard with June changing hers to Ellen Erhard. After more work in car sales, Erhard joined the sales staff of Parents Magazine and was rapidly promoted to training manager and eventually appointed vice-president in 1967. During this period Erhard moved frequently to different parts of the US as dictated by the demands of the job, finally settling in San Francisco. When Parents Magazine was sold to the Time-Life group, he was recruited by the Grolier Society as Divisional Manager. According to Grolier vice-president John Wirtz the intention of appointing Erhard was that he would bring "integrity, honesty and straightforwardness" to their sales practices.

Personal search and self-education

Shortly after moving to St. Louis Erhard began to embark on a program of inquiry and self-education. Initially he focused on self-improvement books such as Think and Grow Rich by Napoleon Hill and Psycho-Cybernetics by Maxwell Maltz. From there, he widened his search to Human Potential Movement psychologists such as Abraham Maslow and Carl Rogers, a range of traditional Western philosophers, and Eastern disciplines such as Zen Buddhism, Taoism, Confucianism, Subud and the Martial arts as well as contemporary movements including Mind Dynamics, and Scientology.

Creating the est training

Bartley recounts a revelation that Erhard said he had experienced in March 1971 while driving into San Francisco, California to work at Grolier Society. Erhard described to Bartley what the revelation experience felt like: "What happened had no form. It was timeless, unbounded, ineffable, beyond language." He told Bartley that he realized: "I had to 'clean up' my life. I had to acknowledge and correct the lies in my life. I saw that the lies that I told about others — my wanting my family, or Ellen (his second wife), or anyone else, to be different from the way that they are -- came from lies that I told about myself -- my wanting to be different from the way that I was." His desire to share this experience led to the plans formed later that year to create the est training. The first promotional seminar was held in September with over one thousand attendees, and the first est training took place in October 1971 in a San Francisco hotel. In October 1972, while leading an est session in New York, Erhard realized that the time had come to reconnect with his family after an absence of 12 years. Although his long absence from his family caused them feelings of confusion and pain, he re-established cordial and loving relationships with all of them. His brother and sister became est Trainers and took on prominent roles in the business. He also set up a separate business venture for Ellen that gave her the financial freedom to choose how to structure her life and her relationship with him.

Key concepts of the est training as defined by Erhard and described in the book include:

- Completion: the acknowledgement of actions or decisions taken in the past, and the taking of steps to bring a resolution.
- Rackets: behavior patterns ostensibly involving complaints about people in one's life, but actually resulting in the perpetuation of the complaint and the securing of a payoff such as dominating the other person.
- Integrity: being whole and complete, and honoring one's word. In the est context the word is used to depict a matter of workability, rather than with the moral overtones it has in everyday usage.
- Stories: the interpretations of experiences which are regarded as reality, leading to conflict with other people who have created differing interpretations of the same events.
- Responsibility: the willingness to accept oneself as the source of outcomes in life – whether welcome or unwelcome – rather than blaming others for them.

Intersections

The biographical chapters on Erhard are interspersed with chapters that Bartley refers to as "Intersections". These chapters contain Bartley's scholarly overview and analysis of the various disciplines that Werner Erhard explored before founding the est training.

== Reception ==
The book was 8th place on the Time non-fiction bestseller list of November 20, 1978. Bartley told The Evening Independent in February 1979 that the book had sold a total of 110,000 copies and gone through five editions.

Jonathan Lieberson, writing for The New York Review of Books, described the book as "attractively written, never shrill or unduly proselytizing, careful to avoid the hysteria and tribalism that usually characterize the early years of movements like est", but considered Bartley to have "fallen" for Erhard. Given Bartley's previous work, Lieberson stated, he might have made an ideal interpreter of Erhard, but he found this expectation "disappointed [although] the book is nevertheless instructive". A review of Werner Erhard in Kirkus Reviews similarly concluded, "Too entranced to be truly objective, Bartley is nonetheless an insightfully partial observer." Booklist stated that Bartley, as an est student, had made the "mistake of being too close to his subject to be objective or critical."

In Psychology Today, Morris B. Parloff stated that Bartley had written his biography of Erhard "carefully, lovingly, and well". Kris Jeter, writing in Cults and the Family, commented that "wise researchers know and teach that one should be in love with their research topic", and counted Bartley's book among several in which "this love was highly evident". Steve McNamarra, in the Pacific Sun, said that the book was "clearly written and, while basically sympathetic" was not "an adulatory 'house job'." McNamarra found the sections detailing Erhard's "soap opera", making up three-quarters of the book, the easiest to read, while the "intersections", passages in which Bartley provided concise summaries of the philosophical traditions underpinning Erhard's est training, were tougher but ultimately rewarding.

Kenneth Wayne Thomas, in Intrinsic Motivation at Work, described the book as "somewhat sympathetic" to Erhard and the est philosophy; Steve Jackson, writing in Westword, similarly included it among "books sympathetic to Erhard, est and Landmark", written by an "old friend of Erhard's". Stephen Goldstein, in a Washington Post review, said Bartley had made it "obvious from the start that he cares about his subject and his own est experience" and had told "a rather simple, straightforward story that pretty much lets you draw your own conclusions [about Erhard] or keep the ones you have already reached." A reviewer in Choice: Current Reviews for Academic Libraries stated he was "enthusiastic about this book", praising the "personal quality [of] the narrative, which, though, sometimes becomes overly detailed." He highly recommended the book for general and college libraries focused on the social sciences.

Other commentators felt that the book was unduly favorable to Erhard. A review of the book in The Christian Century stated that Bartley had got "sucked into" writing a "promo on Erhard, founder of one of the pseudo-therapies of the '70s." The Los Angeles Times commented that "[Bartley's] philosophical justification of est as a mishmash of totalitarianism, hucksterism and existentialism makes this book more a public relations product than an objective study." A Chicago Tribune review described the book as a "painstaking ... act of devotion" that nevertheless failed in its mission: "No one reading it is likely to agree with Bartley that the founder of est is a philosopher and spiritual leader of Gandhian magnitude except the already convinced." James R. Fisher, in Six Silent Killers: Management's Greatest Challenge, and Suzanne Snider, writing for The Believer magazine, referred to Bartley's book as a "hagiography", and Rachel Jones of Noseweek considered the book "sycophantic". A review in The Evening Independent described Bartley as Erhard's "friend and admitted booster", telling his "often-sordid story in detail." E. C. Dennis, writing for Library Journal, found that Bartley's work "has a slick tone and more than a trace of hero worship". Dennis acknowledged that the book gave "the full details of Erhard's 'soap opera,' often in his own words," but was critical of Bartley's writing, saying he cast "a Freud's-eye-view on his subject's youthful failings, but after the famous 'transformation' his tone becomes almost reverential." Dennis stated that the book failed to ask important questions, but that large public libraries should carry a copy, given its status as an "authorized" biography.

== See also ==
- Getting It: The psychology of est
- New age
- Outrageous Betrayal
- The Book of est
