= Bruce Caldwell (economist) =

Economic historian

Bruce J. Caldwell
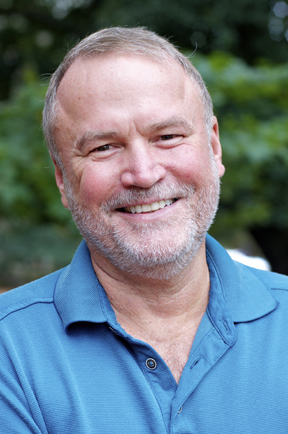
- Born: 1952 (age 73–74)

Academic background
- Education: College of William & Mary (BA); University of North Carolina at Chapel Hill (PhD); New York University
- Influences: Friedrich Hayek

Academic work
- Discipline: Economic methodology history of economic thought
- School or tradition: Austrian School of Economics
- Institutions: Duke University

Bruce J. Caldwell (born 1952) is an American historian of economics, Research Professor of Economics at Duke University, and Director of the Center for the History of Political Economy. Prior to holding this position, Caldwell was the Joe Rosenthal Excellence Professor of Economics at the University of North Carolina at Greensboro. In 1979, he received his Ph.D. in Economics from the University of North Carolina at Chapel Hill. He has held fellowships at New York University, London School of Economics, the Hoover Institution, and Clare Hall, Cambridge, where he is a Life Fellow. While at New York University in 1981-82 for his postdoctoral work, he met and interacted with a number of economists, among them Ludwig Lachmann, Israel Kirzner, Mario Rizzo, Jerry O'Driscoll, Larry White, and Dick Langlois. He is a former president and a distinguished fellow of the Southern Economic Association and the History of Economics Society.

Caldwell is the author of Beyond Positivism: Economic Methodology in the 20th Century, first published in 1982. Born out of his doctoral dissertation, this book provided an early comprehensive treatment of twentieth century philosophy of science which emphasizes the issues relevant to economics.

For the past three decades Caldwell's research has focused on the multi-faceted writings of the Nobel Prize-winning economist and social theorist Friedrich A. Hayek. Caldwell is the General Editor of the University of Chicago's The Collected Works of F.A. Hayek. He is the third editor of the series, after W.W. Bartley III and Stephen Kresge. In particular, Caldwell edited The Road to Serfdom: Text and Documents –The Definitive Edition. His intellectual biography of Hayek, Hayek's Challenge, was published in 2004 by the University of Chicago Press. His more recent biography, Hayek: A Life, 1899-1950, co-authored with Hansjoerg Klausinger, became a 2022 Economist Best Book of the Year and won the 2023 Joseph J. Spengler Prize for the Best Book in the History of Economics from the History of Economics Society. Overall, Caldwell has written and edited more than ten books and fifty scholarly articles in the history and philosophy of economics.
