= Individualism and Economic Order =

Book by Friedrich A. von Hayek

- First US edition
- Author: Friedrich Hayek
- Language: English
- Subject: Economics, philosophy
- Publisher: Routledge Press (UK), University of Chicago Press (US)
- Publication date: 1948
- Publication place: United Kingdom
- Media type: Print
- Pages: 280
- ISBN: 0-226-32093-6
- OCLC: 35953883

Individualism and Economic Order is a book written by Friedrich Hayek. It is a collection of essays originally published in the 1930s and 1940s, discussing topics ranging from moral philosophy to the methods of the social sciences and economic theory to contrast free markets with planned economies. It contains several of his major contribution to the fields of economics, philosophy, and political science. Published in 1948, the book is widely considered a classic of libertarian thought. Hayek presents his vision of individualism as a cornerstone of economic and social theory.

The book's chapters have had a major impact on both economics and political philosophy. His arguments have been cited by many leading economists, including Nobel laureates like Elinor Ostrom, James M. Buchanan, and Milton Friedman, who have used Hayek's theories to shape their own work in these fields. It has also shaped the thinking of many libertarians who continue to use his concepts when arguing for the importance of individual freedom in modern economies.

== Essays ==
=== "Individualism: True and False" ===
This chapter was delivered at University College Dublin, December 17, 1945. In it, Hayek argues that two basic tendencies have developed in thinking about Individualism, a British tendency and a French tendency. The British tendency emphasizes the limited abilities of human beings and therefore defends a social vision of emergent order through the rule of law and individual freedom. The French tendency emphasizes the greatness of humans' individual abilities, and therefore tends towards the view that individuals can create great societies through deliberate intention. This leads to the expansion of state authority and is therefore, in Hayek's view, a false individualism.

Hayek argues for the defense of "true individualism," a social philosophy rooted in the intellectual traditions of British thinkers like John Locke, Adam Smith, and the Irishman Edmund Burke. He contrasts this with a different form of "individualism" influenced by Cartesian rationalism, which tends to evolve into collectivism or socialism. True individualism, according to Hayek, is not about isolated individuals but recognizes that human nature is shaped by society. It values the limitations of human knowledge and emphasizes minimal coercion, advocating for decentralized power, local autonomy, and voluntary associations. Hayek criticizes the modern trend toward centralization and overreliance on reason, warning that it leads to a reduction of social complexity to the limited scope of individual minds, which could ultimately harm society's freedom and richness.

=== "Economics and Knowledge" ===
Delivered at the London Economic Club at the London School of Economics, November 1936, this article argues the economic concept of an equilibrium can only be made coherent if economists understand equilibrium as being about the cessation of the revision of plans in light of newly acquired knowledge.

Hayek discusses the role of knowledge and foresight in economic analysis, particularly within the context of equilibrium theory. Hayek writes how assumptions about what individuals know, and how they foresee the future, are crucial in understanding economic equilibrium. The concept of equilibrium depends on individuals’ plans being consistent with their knowledge at a given time. If their knowledge changes, their plans, and thus equilibrium, may be disrupted. Hayek criticizes the traditional equilibrium analysis for confusing subjective data (what individuals know) with objective data (real-world facts). He writes on the importance of understanding the real-world relevance of economic models and ensuring that theoretical analysis remains connected to practical realities.

=== "The Facts of the Social Sciences" ===
This chapter contains Hayek's argument that explanations of social behavior must be founded in the beliefs of the agents whose actions are being explained, not objective facts about the world or the opinions of the social scientist studying the behavior. It was delivered as a talk at the Cambridge University Moral Science Club, November 1942.

Hayek discusses the nature and scope of the social sciences. Hayek writes that not all disciplines within the social sciences present the same issues, and that the focus should be on understanding and classifying individual behavior rather than explaining it. Hayek argues that social theory is fundamentally connected to history, providing a framework to understand and explain historical events and patterns. This theoretical framework guides the selection and interpretation of historical facts, and it is through this lens that social phenomena can be understood and explained.

=== "The Use of Knowledge in Society" ===
Published in the American Economic Review, September 1945.

=== "The Meaning of Competition" ===
Hayek argues that the conventional definition of competition in economic theory, perfect competition, actually completely excludes any activity that can be meaningfully called competition. Rather, that theory describes a state of affairs that obtains after competition has completed. Derived from a paper delivered at Princeton University, May 1946.

Hayek presents a critical examination of the modern theory of perfect competition in economics and its assumptions. It argues that this theory falls short in capturing the true nature of competition and its impact. According to Hayek, the modern theory of competition, the theory of competitive equilibrium, assumes a state of perfect information and harmony among market participants. In this state, all individuals and firms are assumed to have perfect knowledge of the lowest production costs, demands, and other relevant data, leading to a balanced and stable market. However, Hayek writes that this state is not inherent but rather the outcome of a dynamic process of competition. Competition is a force that drives market participants to adapt, innovate, and seek out information to improve their positions. By assuming perfect knowledge and adjustment of data among participants, the theory overlooks the crucial question of how this equilibrium is achieved in the first place. In reality, it is through the competitive process that such knowledge is discovered and disseminated. Hayek also writes the notion of imperfect competition and how it is often misunderstood. Imperfect competition does not imply a lack of competitive spirit or intensity but rather refers to the inherent differences in commodities and services. These differences can lead to variations in the outcomes of competition, but they do not diminish the significance or effectiveness of the competitive process itself. Hayek writes that true competition, even if imperfect, tends to result in efficient resource allocation and market responsiveness. On the other hand, the suppression of competition, often with the involvement of state power, can lead to entrenched monopolies, higher costs, and inefficiencies. Hayek writes about the dynamic and informational aspects of competition. Competition is described as a process of opinion and market formation, where participants continuously adapt and learn. This evolving nature of competition is overlooked when it is treated as a static concept with perfect equilibrium.

=== "'Free' Enterprise and Competitive Order" ===
Derived from a paper delivered to the Mont Pelerin Society, April 1947.

=== "Socialist Calculation I: The Nature and History of the Problem" ===
Published in Collectivist Economic Planning (1935)

=== "Socialist Calculation II: The State of the Debate (1935)" ===
Published in Collectivist Economic Planning (1935)

=== "Socialist Calculation III: The Competitive 'Solution'" ===
Published in the Economica, May 1940.

=== "A Commodity Reserve Currency" ===
Published in the Economic Journal, June–September 1943.

=== "The Ricardo Effect" ===
Published in Economica, May 1942.

=== "The Economic Conditions of Interstate Federalism" ===
Published in the New Commonwealth Quarterly, September 1939.
