= Panrationalism =

Panrationalism (or comprehensive rationalism) holds two premises true:

1. A rationalist accepts any position that can be justified or established by appeal to the rational criteria or authorities.
2. They accept only those positions that can be so justified.

The first problem that needs to be dealt with is: what is the rational criterion or authority to which they appeal? Here the panrationalists diverge into two groups:

1. Intellectualists – to whom the rational authority lies in the human intellect, in the faculty of reason.
2. Empiricists – to whom the rational authority is achieved by sense experience (such as seeing or hearing).

Descartes is considered the founder of rationalism and gave the illustration cogito ergo sum as the paradigm to demonstrate what he believed.

The problem of both these appeals is that:

1. Intellectualism is "too wide" by letting too much in (basically everything, in a strict sense).
2. Empiricism is "too narrow" in that it excludes too much (basically everything, in a strict sense).

In his The Critique of Pure Reason Kant sought to reconcile both appeals.

== See also ==
- Critical rationalism
- Pancritical rationalism
