= Catallactics =

Theory about the free market system in economies

Catallactics or catallaxy is a theory of the way the free market system reaches exchange ratios and prices. It aims to analyse all actions based on monetary calculation and trace the formation of prices back to the point where agents have made choices. It explains prices as they are, rather than as they "should" be. The laws of catallactics are not value judgments, but aim to be exact, empirical, and of universal validity. It was used extensively by the Austrian School economist Ludwig von Mises.

== Etymology ==
The term catallactics comes from the Greek verb καταλλάσσω which means to exchange, to reconcile.

== Definition ==
Catallactics is a praxeological theory. The term catallaxy was used by Friedrich Hayek to describe "the order brought about by the mutual adjustment of many individual economies in a market." Hayek was dissatisfied with the usage of the word "economy" because its Greek root, which translates as "household management", implies that economic agents in a market economy possess shared goals. He derived the word "Catallaxy" (Hayek's suggested Greek construction would be rendered καταλλαξία) from the Greek verb katallasso (καταλλάσσω) which meant not only "to exchange" but also "to admit in the community" and "to change from enemy into friend."

According to Mises and Hayek it was Richard Whately who coined the term "catallactics". Whately's Introductory Lectures on Political Economy (1831) reads:

It is with a view to put you on your guard against prejudices thus created, (and you will meet probably with many instances of persons influenced by them,) that I have stated my objections to the name of Political-Economy. It is now, I conceive, too late to think of changing it. A. Smith, indeed, has designated his work a treatise on the "Wealth of Nations;" but this supplies a name only for the subject-matter, not for the science itself. The name I should have preferred as the most descriptive, and on the whole least objectionable, is that of CATALLACTICS, or the "Science of Exchanges."

== See also ==
- Price signal
- Catallaxy
- Henry Dunning Macleod

== Bibliography ==
- Buchanan, James M. (1979). What Should Economists Do?. Indianapolis, IN: Liberty Press. pp. 19 – via Internet Archive.
- Buchanan, James M. (1992). "I did not call him "Fritz": Personal Recollection of Professor F. A. v. Hayek". Constitutional Political Economy. 3 (2): 134. doi:10.1007/BF02393117.
- Chafuen, Alejandro (24 December 2022). "The Free Economy As A Gift From God". Forbes.
- Hayek, F. A. (1968). The Confusion of Language in Political Thought. London: Institute of Economic Affairs. pp. 28–31.
- Hayek, F.A. (1978). "The Confusion of Language in Political Thought". New Studies in Philosophy, Politics, Economics and History of Ideas. London and Chicago: Routledge and University of Chicago Press. pp. 90–92 – via Internet Archive.
- Hayek, F. A. (1988). Bartley III, W. W. (ed.). The Fatal Conceit: The Errors of Socialism (The Collected Works of F. A. Hayek). Vol. 1. Chicago: The University of Chicago Press. pp. 111–112 – via Internet Archive.
- Kirzner, Israel M. (1960). The Economic Point of View: An Essay in the History of Economic Thought. Kansas City: Sheed and Ward, Inc. pp. 72–73.
- Machlup, Fritz (May 1951). "Schumpeter's Economic Methodology". Review of Economics and Statistics. 33 (2): 145–151. doi:10.2307/1925877. JSTOR 1925877.
- Macleod, Henry Dunning (1896). The History of Economics. London: Bliss, Sands and Co. pp. 108–110 – via Internet Archive.
- Perry, Arthur Latham (1891). Principles of Political Economy. New York: Scribner.
- Plough, Patrick (1842). Letters on the Rudiments of a Science, called, formerly, improperly, Political Economy, recently more pertinently, Catallactics. London: Joseph Masters – via Google Books.
- Ruskin, John (1903). "Ad Valorem". "Unto This Last": Four Essays on the Principles of Political Economy. London: George Allen. p. 132 – via Internet Archive.
