= The Fatal Conceit =

1988 book by Friedrich Hayek

- Author: Friedrich Hayek
- Language: English
- Series: The Collected Works of F. A. Hayek
- Subject: Socialism
- Publisher: University of Chicago Press (US); Routledge Press (UK)
- Publication date: 1988
- Publication place: United States
- Media type: Print
- Pages: 194
- ISBN: 0-226-32066-9
- OCLC: 24815557

The Fatal Conceit: The Errors of Socialism is a book written by the economist and political philosopher Friedrich Hayek and edited by the philosopher William Warren Bartley. The book was first published in 1988 by the University of Chicago Press.

The title of the book derives from a passage in Adam Smith's The Theory of Moral Sentiments (1759), though the exact phrase does not occur in Smith's book.

== Summary ==
The book aims to refute socialism by demonstrating not only that socialist theories are logically incorrect, but also that even the premises those theories rely on are incorrect. According to Hayek, civilizations grew because societal traditions placed importance on private property, enabling economic expansion, trade, and eventually the modern capitalist system, which he calls the extended order. Hayek says this demonstrates a key flaw within socialist thought, which holds that only purposefully designed changes can be maximally efficient. He also says that "statist" economies (which include socialist economies) cannot be efficient because efficiency in a modern economy requires that knowledge be dispersed rather than concentrated. Hayek notes that modern civilization and all its customs and traditions naturally led to the current order and are needed for its continuance. It follows therefore, he asserts, that fundamental changes to the system — made in an attempt to control it — are impossible or unsustainable in modern civilization, and so are doomed to fail. Price signals are the only means of enabling each economic decision-maker to exchange tacit knowledge or dispersed knowledge with each other to solve the economic calculation problem.

== Authorship ==
There is scholarly debate on the extent of William Warren Bartley's influence on the work. Officially, Bartley was the editor who prepared the book for publication once Hayek fell ill in 1985. However, the inclusion of material from Bartley's philosophical point of view and citations that other people provided to Bartley have led to questions about how much of the book was written by Hayek and whether Hayek knew about the added material. Bruce Caldwell thinks the evidence "clearly points towards a conclusion that the book was a product more of [Bartley's] pen than of Hayek's. ... Bartley may have written the book".

== See also ==
- Dispersed knowledge
- Fallibilism
- Invisible hand
- Opportunity cost
- Tax choice
- "The Use of Knowledge in Society", essay by Hayek
