= The Use of Knowledge in Society =

1945 scholarly article by economist Friedrich Hayek

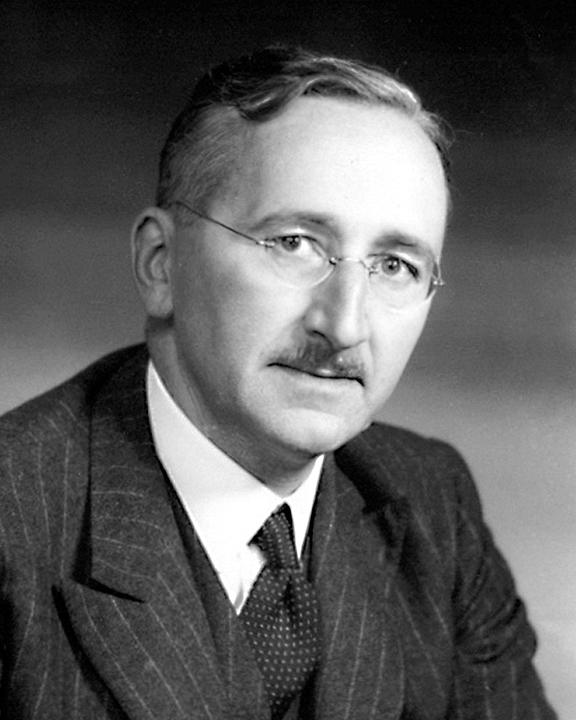
Friedrich Hayek

"The Use of Knowledge in Society" is a scholarly article written by Austrian-British academic economist Friedrich Hayek, first published in the September 1945 issue of The American Economic Review.

Written (along with The Meaning of Competition) as a rebuttal to fellow economist Oskar R. Lange and his endorsement of a planned economy, it was included among the twelve essays in Hayek's 1948 compendium Individualism and Economic Order. The article is considered one of the most important in the field of modern economics.

Hayek argues that information is decentralized and that that knowledge is unevenly dispersed among different members of society. As a result, decisions are best made by those with local knowledge rather than by a central authority. The article's influence extended beyond economics, Jimmy Wales, co-founder of Wikipedia, stated these concepts were "central" to his thinking about "how to manage the Wikipedia project".

== Argument ==
Hayek's article argues against the establishment of a Central Pricing Board (advocated by Lange) by highlighting the dynamic and organic nature of market price-fluctuations, and the benefits of this phenomenon. He asserts that a centrally planned economy could never match the efficiency of the open market because what is known by a single agent is only a small fraction of the sum total of knowledge held by all members of society. A decentralized economy thus complements the dispersed nature of information spread throughout society. In Hayek's words, "The marvel is that in a case like that of a scarcity of one raw material, without an order being issued, without more than perhaps a handful of people knowing the cause, tens of thousands of people whose identity could not be ascertained by months of investigation, are made to use the material or its products more sparingly; that is, they move in the right direction." The article also discusses the concepts of 'individual equilibrium' and of Hayek's notion of the divide between information which is useful and practicable versus that which is purely scientific or theoretical.

== Reception ==
Regarded as a seminal work, "The Use of Knowledge in Society" was one of the most praised and cited articles of the twentieth century. The article managed to convince market socialists and members of the Cowles Commission (Hayek's intended target) and was positively received by economists Herbert A. Simon, Paul Samuelson, and Robert Solow.

UCLA economist Armen Alchian remembers the excitement of reading Hayek's essay and stopping fellow economists in the hallway to ask if they had read Hayek's essay. In 2011 "The Use of Knowledge in Society" was selected as one of the top 20 articles published in the American Economic Review during its first 100 years. Tom Butler-Bowdon included "The Use of Knowledge in Society" in his 2017 book, 50 Economics Classics.

While calling the essay "powerful and luminous," economist George Stigler, in his Nobel Prize Lecture, stated that Hayek failed to address the principles of knowledge acquisition.

As of 2023, the article had over 22,000 citations in Google Scholar.

== Influence ==
Jimmy Wales, co-founder of Wikipedia, cites "The Use of Knowledge in Society", which he read as an undergraduate student, as "central" to his thinking about "how to manage the Wikipedia project". Hayek argued that information is decentralized – that knowledge is unevenly dispersed among different members of society – and that as a result, decisions are best made by those with local knowledge rather than by a central authority.

The article "set the stage" for later use of game theory models. The article vitally influenced economist Thomas Sowell and served as his inspiration to write Knowledge and Decisions. Swedish economist Assar Lindbeck, who chaired the prize committee for the Nobel Memorial Prize in Economic Sciences, testified that "The Use of Knowledge in Society" was the work that clarified the "advantages of well-functioning markets" for him.

== See also ==
- Invisible hand
- Opportunity cost
- The Fatal Conceit: The Errors of Socialism, a book by Hayek
- “I, Pencil”
