= Heinrich Hayek =

Austrian anatomist and zoologist (1900–1969)

- Hayek in 1958
- Born: Heinrich Franz Felix Edler von Hayek; 29 October 1900; Vienna, Austria-Hungary
- Died: 28 September 1969 (aged 68); Vienna, Austria
- Education: University of Vienna
- Occupations: Anatomist; comparative zoologist
- Father: August von Hayek
- Relatives: Friedrich Hayek (brother); Gustav von Hayek (grandfather)

Heinrich Hayek (born Heinrich Franz Felix Edler von Hayek; 29 October 1900 – 28 September 1969) was an Austrian anatomist and comparative zoologist. He had been a member of the Nazi Party from 1938 (member number 5518677) and was involved in anatomical studies, several made on the bodies of victims executed by the Third Reich. A major and influential work resulting from this was a book on the human lung Die Menschliche Lunge (1953).

== Early life ==
Von Hayek was born in Vienna, son of physician and professor of botany August von Hayek (1871–1928) and grandson of zoologist Gustav von Hayek. His younger brother Erich Gustav became a professor of chemistry, while his older brother Friedrich August became a Nobel prize winner in economics in 1974. The family had been given a noble title which was taken away in Austria in 1919.

Von Hayek was educated at Vienna where he received a medical degree in 1924. He did not get drafted into World War I, as he was considered to be of poor physique. He worked as an assistant to Ferdinand Hochstetter at the University of Vienna while also studying zoology. In 1929, he earned a doctorate in zoology specializing in comparative anatomy. He then became a senior assistant at the University of Rostock under Curt Elze.

== Career ==
During the Nazi years, he investigated methods to study arteries using freshy executed victims of the Third Reich. In 1935, Hayek was recruited as a professor of anatomy at the Tongji University in Shanghai, which had an anatomy department traditionally headed by Germans. In 1937, the institute where he worked was destroyed during the Second Sino-Japanese War and Hayek fled into interior China. At the end of year, he received a position at the University of Würzburg, but he was able to leave China only in 1938. He worked on various anatomical topics, including physical anthropology research with studies of Chinese frontal lobes. Hayek taught at Würzburg and served as an interim director in 1939-40 when Hans Petersen (1885–1946) was away. In 1945, the city was bombed and the university was largely destroyed. In August 1945, the Allied forces dismissed him from his position based on his membership in the NSDAP. He had also been a member of the NS Volkswohlfahrt and NS teachers' associations. He served as a Stützpunktleiter (local manager) for the Reichs-dozentenschaft (teachers union).

Hayek published 17 papers between 1938 and 1945, and he noted in a 1940 manuscript that his studies of the interlobar septa of the lungs was best carried out on the lungs of young executed persons which had been made available to him. Nine of the 17 studies noted that the bodies used were of execution victims. The University of Würzburg received 910 bodies, of which 120 came from well-known execution sites. The anatomical institute received 80 bodies killed by carbon monoxide at a psychiatric institution under a program of euthanasia headed by Werner Heyde. According to the questionnaire that Hayek had to fill during denazification, Hayek had to take an oath of secrecy under a high-ranking SS officer regarding the origin of the bodies. Hayek made use of his network of connections to rehabilitate himself after the war. He became a non-tenured professor at the University of Würzburg in November 1947.

In 1952, he moved to Vienna, where he became a professor working until his death. He also held the chair of histology and embryology in 1957 and served as dean of medicine in 1960–61.

== Death ==
He died on 28 September 1969 in Vienna.
