= The Denationalisation of Money =

1976 Friedrich Hayek book

- Author: Friedrich Hayek
- Publisher: Institute of Economic Affairs
- English publication date: 1976

The Denationalisation of Money is a 1976 book by Friedrich Hayek. The author advocated the establishment of competitively issued private moneys. In 1978 Hayek published a revised and enlarged edition entitled Denationalisation of Money: The Argument Refined, where he speculated that rather than entertaining an unmanageable number of currencies, markets would converge on one or only a limited number of monetary standards, on which institutions would base the issue of their notes.

== Overview ==
According to Hayek, instead of a national government issuing a specific currency, use of which is imposed on all members of its economy by force in the form of legal tender laws, private businesses should be allowed to issue their own forms of money, deciding how to do so on their own.

== Synopsis ==
Hayek advocates a system of private currency in which financial institutions create currencies that compete for acceptance. Stability in value is presumed to be the decisive factor for acceptance. Hayek makes the assumption that competition will favor currencies with the greatest stability in value since a devalued currency hurts creditors, and an upward-revalued currency hurts debtors. Hence users would choose the monies which they expected to offer a mutually acceptable intersection between depreciation and appreciation. Hayek suggests that institutions may find through experimentation that an extensive basket of commodities forms the ideal monetary base. Institutions would issue and regulate their currency primarily through loan-making, and secondarily through currency buying and selling activities. It is postulated that the financial press would report daily information on whether institutions are managing their currencies within a previously defined tolerance. Hayek's effort has been cited by economists George Selgin, Richard Timberlake, and Lawrence White.

== Criticism ==
Economist Milton Friedman was critical of Hayek's writings of the 1970s on monetary reform. Noting Hayek's vigorous defense of invisible hand evolution that Hayek said has created better economic institutions than could be created by central planning, Friedman claimed Hayek was then proposing to replace the monetary system thus created with a deliberate construct of his own design. Moreover, Friedman claimed, there is nothing in the current law of most developed economies to prevent voluntary bilateral exchange via any medium freely accepted by two parties.

In a 1977 review of the book, economist David H. Howard also noted that Hayek neglected to address the extent to which existing monetary institutions evolved to meet real economic needs. Furthermore, Howard states, Hayek's regime of competitive moneys may result in the establishment of a new monopoly similar to the existing system. According to Howard, Hayek did not consider the real costs and other inefficiencies of a system of competing monies that might lead to such an outcome.

Austrian School economist Lawrence H. White was critical of Hayek's assumption that the most stable currencies would win market acceptance.

== Impact and Bitcoin ==
According to the European Central Bank, the decentralisation of money offered by bitcoin has its theoretical roots in The Denationalisation of Money: The Argument Refined, whilst political philosopher Adam James Tebble has argued that there are important differences between Hayek's vision and cryptocurrency, because the latter takes decentralisation a step further than Hayek ever envisaged.

== See also ==
- The Road to Serfdom
- Bernard von NotHaus
- Counterfeit money
- Digital currency
- Complementary currency
