= Free banking =

Economic system

Free banking is a monetary arrangement where banks are free to issue their own paper currency (banknotes) while also being subject to no special regulations beyond those applicable to most enterprises.

In a free banking system, market forces control the total quantity of banknotes and deposits that can be supported by any given stock of cash reserves, where such reserves consist either of a scarce commodity (such as gold) or of an artificially limited stock of fiat money issued by a central bank.

In the strictest versions of free banking, however, there is either no role at all for a central bank, or the supply of central bank money is supposed to be permanently "frozen". There is, therefore, no government agency acting as a monopoly "lender of last resort", leaving that to the private sector as happened in the US in the panic of 1907. Nor is there any government insurance for banknotes or bank deposit accounts.

Notable supporters include Fred Foldvary, David D. Friedman, Friedrich Hayek, George Selgin, Steven Horwitz, and Richard Timberlake.

While Hayek is generally considered to be the pioneering proponent of free banking in the post war era with his 1976 tract, The Denationalization of Money, prior to him economist Benjamin Klein in his article The Competitive Supply of Money (1974) had argued in its favour.

== History ==
Banking has been more regulated in some times and places than others, and in some times and places it has hardly been regulated at all, giving some experiences of more or less free banking. Free banking systems have existed in more than 60 countries. The first system of competitive issuance of notes began more than 1,000 years ago in China (see below). Free banking was widespread in the 19th and early 20th centuries. Dowd (1992) lists the most currently known episodes of free banking and discusses in some depth a number of them, including Canada, Colombia, Fuzhou, France, and Ireland. Monetary arrangements with monopoly issues of notes, including government treasury issues, currency boards, and central banking, replaced all episodes of free banking by the mid-20th century. There were several reasons for the demise of free banking:

- Economic theories claim the superiority of central banking.
- Desire to imitate the institutions of more advanced economies, especially Great Britain. The Bank of England was the model for many later central banks, even outside the British Empire.
- Desire of national governments to collect seigniorage (revenue from issue) from note issues.
- Financial crises in some free banking systems that created demands to replace free banking with another system that advocates hoped would have fewer problems.

Some prominent 18th and 19th century economists, most notably Adam Smith, defended free banking as opposed to the real bills doctrine. After the mid 19th century, though, economists interested in monetary issues focused their attention elsewhere, and free banking received little attention. Free banking as a subject of renewed debate among economists got its modern start in 1976 with The Denationalisation of Money, by economist Friedrich Hayek, who advocated that national governments stop claiming a monopoly on the issuing of currency, and allow private issuers like banks to voluntarily compete to do so.

In the 1980s, this expanded into an increasingly elaborate theory of free market money and banking, with proponents Lawrence White, George Selgin, and Richard Timberlake increasingly centering their writing and research around the concept, either regarding modern theory and application, or researching the history of spontaneously free banking.

=== Australia ===
In the late 19th century, banking in Australia was subject to little regulation. There were four large banks with over 100 branches each, that together had about half of the banking business, and branch banking and deposit banking were much more advanced than in other more regulated countries such as the UK and US. Banks accepted each other's notes at par. Interest margins were about 4% p.a. In the 1890s a land price crash caused the failure of many smaller banks and building societies. Bankruptcy legislation put in place at the time gave bank debtors generous terms they could restructure under, and most of the banks used this as a means to restructure their debts in their favor, even though they did not really need to.

=== Switzerland ===
In the 19th century, several Swiss cantons deregulated banking, allowing free entry and the issue of notes. Cantons retained jurisdiction over banking until the enactment of the Federal Banking Law of 1881. The centralisation of note issue reduced the problem of the existence of "a bewildering variety of notes of varying qualities ... at fluctuating exchange rates."

=== Scotland ===
Scottish free banking lasted between 1716 and 1845, and is arguably the most researched and developed instance of free banking. The system was organized around three chartered banks – the Bank of Scotland, the Royal Bank of Scotland, and the British Linen Company – and numerous unchartered banks. It resulted in a highly stable and competitive banking system.

=== United States ===
Although the period from 1837 to 1864 in the US is often referred to as the Free Banking Era, the term is a misnomer in terms of the definition of "free banking" above. Free Banking in the United States before the Civil War refers to various state banking systems based on what were called "free banking" laws at the time. These laws made it necessary for new entrants to secure charters, each of which was subject to a vote by the state legislature with obvious opportunities for corruption. These general banking laws also restricted banks' activities in important ways. Most importantly, US free banks could have only one office and had to provide security for their notes not only through gold reserves but also by purchasing and surrendering to state banking authorities certain securities the state law deemed acceptable for the purpose. The securities generally included bonds of state governments. The depreciation of these bonds was the chief cause of bank failures in various episodes when many banks in a state failed. The lack of branch banking, in turn, caused state-issued banknotes to be discounted at varying rates once they had traveled any considerable distance from their sources, which was an inconvenience. Depreciation of assets more generally is also used to explain failures. Several authors attribute the high-rate of bank failures during the Free Banking era in the US ultimately to restrictions on banks' portfolios of assets. Then, from 1863 to 1913, known as the National Banks Era, state-chartered banks operated under a free banking system. Some scholars have found that the system was mostly stable compared to the National Banks of that era.

=== Sweden ===
Sweden had two periods of free banking, 1830–1860 and 1860–1902. Following a bank crisis in 1857, there was a rise in popular support for private banks and private money issuers (especially Stockholms Enskilda Bank, founded in 1856). A new bank law was adopted by parliament in 1864, deregulating the interest rate. The following decades marked the height of the Swedish free banking era. After 1874, no new private banks were founded. In 1901, issuing of private money was prohibited. Research on the Swedish free banking era suggests stability, and a single bank failure related to fraud in 70 years.

=== China ===
Jiaozi was a form of banknote that appeared around the 10th century in the Sichuan capital of Chengdu, China. Between 960 and 1004, the bank notes were totally run by private merchants. Until the government decided to regulate the business due to alleged increasing fraud cases and disputes, it granted 16 licenses to the biggest merchants of all.

=== India ===
Free Banking prevailed in India in the first half of the 19th century. There are about fifteen recorded cases of such banks and possibly many more existed. The earliest one was the Bank of Hindustan. The Paper Currency Act of 1861 marked the start of a monopoly in currency note issue by the Government of (British) India, four years after it ascended to power after 1857 taking over from the East India Company.

== See also ==
- Bank Charter Act 1844, a U.K. law ending permission for banks to issue bank notes that acted as currency
- Money as Debt, 2006 animated documentary film
- Henry Meulen, author of Free Banking: An Outline of a Policy on Individualism, 1934
- Wildcat banking

== Bibliography ==
- Selgin, George (1988). The Theory of Free Banking. Rowman & Littlefield Publishers; Cato Institute. ISBN 9780847675784. OCLC 16405124.
- White, Lawrence H (1992). Competition and Currency: Essays on Free Banking and Money. New York University Press. ISBN 9780814792247. OCLC 19392491.
