= Law, Legislation and Liberty =

Book by Friedrich von Hayek

- Author: Friedrich Hayek
- Publication date: 1973-1979

Law, Legislation and Liberty is a work in three volumes by Nobel laureate economist and political philosopher Friedrich Hayek. In it, Hayek further develops the philosophical principles he discussed earlier in The Road to Serfdom, The Constitution of Liberty, and other writings. Law, Legislation and Liberty is more abstract than Hayek's earlier work, and it focuses on the conflicting views of society as either a design, a made order ("taxis"), on the one hand, or an emergent system, a grown order ("cosmos"), on the other. These ideas are then connected to two different forms of law: law proper, or "nomos" coinciding more or less with the traditional concept of natural law, which is an emergent property of social interaction, and legislation, or "thesis", which is properly confined to the administration of non-coercive government services, but is easily confused with the occasional acts of legislature that do actually straighten out flaws in the nomos.

== Contents ==
Vol. 1 : Rules and Order (1973)

1. Reason and Evolution
2. Cosmos and Taxis
3. Principles and Expediency
4. The Changing Concept of Law
5. Nomos: The Law of Liberty
6. Thesis: The Law of Legislation

Vol. 2 : The Mirage of Social Justice (1976)

1. General Welfare and Particular Purposes
2. The Quest for Justice
3. 'Social' or Distributive Justice
4. The Market Order or Catallaxy
5. The Discipline of Abstract Rules and the Emotions of the Tribal Society

Vol. 3 : The Political Order of a Free People (1979)

1. Majority Opinion and Contemporary Democracy
2. The Division of Democratic Powers
3. The Public Sector and the Private Sector
4. Government Policy and the Market
5. The Miscarriage of the Democratic Ideal: A Recapitulation
6. A Model Constitution
7. The Containment of Power and the Dethronement of Politics
- Epilogue: The Three Sources of Human Values

== See also ==
- Austrian School of economics
- Philosophy of law
- Catallaxy
