= Laurence Hayek =

British physician and microbiologist, and son of F.A. Hayek

Laurence Joseph Hayek
- Born: 15 July 1934; Vienna, Republic of Austria
- Died: 15 July 2004 (aged 70); Dartington, Devon, UK
- Other name: Larry Hayek
- Citizenship: Austrian (1934–1938); British (1938–2004)
- Education: King's College, Cambridge
- Occupations: Physician; microbiologist
- Spouse: Ann Esca Drury (m. 1961)
- Children: 3
- Parents: Friedrich von Hayek (father); Helen Berta Maria von Fritsch (mother)
- Relatives: Christine Maria Felicitas von Hayek (sister); August von Hayek (grandfather)
- Scientific career
- Fields: Microbiology

Laurence Joseph Hayek (15 July 1934 – 15 July 2004), a.k.a. Larry Hayek, was an Austrian-born English microbiologist. He was the son of the economist and political philosopher Friedrich August Hayek (1899–1992).

== Life ==
Born Lorenz Josef Heinrich Erich von Hayek on 15 July 1934 in Vienna, Austria. He was brought up in Britain, where his father worked at the London School of Economics, and was naturalized, together with his sister, on 18 July 1938. During the war the LSE was evacuated to Cambridge, and Hayek was found a place at King's College School, Cambridge, with the help of John Maynard Keynes (1883–1946), his father's friend and fellow economist.

After the war Laurence Hayek finished school at Westminster School, and studied medicine at King's College, Cambridge.

He performed his National Service as cadet and 2nd Lt.

He became GP and then pathologist at Middlesex Hospital. He married Esca Drury, a nurse, in 1961, they had three children, Ann, Catherine and Crispin. In 1974 the family moved to Devon, where he was consultant microbiologist at Torbay Hospital. He was a council member of the Association of Clinical Pathologists and a member of the editorial board of the Journal of Clinical Pathology.

Laurence retired in 1999 yet spent much of his remaining years taking locums in other hospitals. He spent a good deal of his time promoting his father's work. He and Esca were keen campanologists.

Hayek died unexpectedly in 2004 in Dartington, Devon on the morning of his 70th birthday with his family with him.
