= Richard Timberlake =

Professor of economics (1922–2020)

- Born: Richard Henry Timberlake, Jr. June 24, 1922; Steubenville, Ohio, U.S.
- Died: May 22, 2020 (aged 97); Athens, Georgia, U.S.

Academic background
- Education: University of Chicago (Ph.D.), 1957
- Influences: Friedrich Hayek, Milton Friedman, Earl J. Hamilton

Academic work
- Discipline: Economics
- School or tradition: Free Banking
- Institutions: University of Georgia (1964–1990)
- Notable ideas: Real bills doctrine as the origin of the Great Depression, free banking

Richard Henry Timberlake Jr. (June 24, 1922 – May 22, 2020) was an American economist who was Professor of Economics at the University of Georgia for much of his career. He became a leading advocate of free banking, the belief that money should be issued by private companies, not by a government monopoly. He wrote about the Legal Tender Cases of the U.S. Supreme Court in his book Constitutional Money: A Review of the Supreme Court's Monetary Decisions.

== History ==
Born in Steubenville, Ohio on June 24, 1922, Timberlake was in the US military in World War II. He became a pilot in the U.S. Air Forces and flew 26 missions as a co-pilot in the 8th Air Force. He was awarded three Purple Hearts. He obtained a Bachelor of Arts at Kenyon College in 1946, a Master's at Columbia University in 1950, and a Ph.D. in 1959 from the University of Chicago where he studied under Milton Friedman and Earl J. Hamilton.

He then taught economics at Muhlenberg College, Norwich University, Rensselaer Polytechnic, Florida State University, and the University of Georgia from 1963 to 1990, when he retired. Timberlake's research was on the history of money, central banking, and monetary policy. He died in Georgia on May 22, 2020.

== Ideas ==
Timberlake's research on the development of private moneys occurred at the time of Friedrich Hayek's idea of The Denationalisation of Money, extending and expanding upon it in coordination with the free banking movement. He believed that, instead of a government-imposed central bank, there should be a free market in the production of money, with banks choosing how to issue their own, competing currencies.

Timberlake also examined the causes of the Great Depression, and emphasized the switch of the Federal Reserve, starting in 1929, to the real bills doctrine of money management, and an anti-speculation policy that severely reduced bank reserves and the amount of deposit money that the banks could create. The money supply contracted by 30% in four years, something that no market economy could tolerate. Along with Hayek of the Austrian school, Milton Friedman of the Chicago school, and even the Keynesians, Timberlake saw this Fed policy as the primary cause of the Great Depression.

However, Timberlake did not reject the gold standard. While many economists blamed the gold standard for the monetary collapse, Timberlake cited data that refutes the validity of their complaints. He showed that the Fed Banks and U.S. Treasury had plenty of gold in the 1929–1933 period. Timberlake concluded that government interference with gold standard adjustments caused most of the trouble in the past, producing cycles of money growth and deflation, panic and depression.

Timberlake's papers are housed at the Hoover Institution Library & Archives at Stanford University.

== Politics ==
Timberlake was active in politics as a member of the Libertarian Party. He was involved in the Harry Browne presidential campaign, writing and signing open letters advocating various positions, such as school choice and rejection of policies that would have raised taxes. In the past he was a vocal and outspoken opponent of the science behind anthropogenic climate change, writing a number of op-ed pieces for the Athens Banner Herald. He was an adjunct scholar at the Cato Institute.

== Works ==
- Money and Banking, with Edward Selby (1972)
- The origins of central banking in the United States. Harvard University Press. 1978. ISBN 978-0-674-64480-9.
- Gold, Greenbacks, and the Constitution (1991)
- Money and the Nation State, with Kevin Dowd (1998)
- Monetary Policy in the United States: An Intellectual and Institutional History. University of Chicago Press. 1993. ISBN 978-0-226-80384-5.
- They Never Saw Me Then (2002)
- Constitutional Money: A Review of the Supreme Court’s Monetary Decisions (2013)
- Gold, the Real Bills Doctrine, and the Fed: Sources of Monetary Disorder – 1922–1938, with Thomas M. Humphrey (2019) ISBN 978-1948647557

Articles in:

- The New Palgrave Dictionary of Money and Finance
- The Encyclopedia of Business History and Biography

== See also ==
- 'Gold standard' theory of the Great Depression
