= The Geistkreis =

Viennese seminar of science and ideas active between 1921 and 1938

The Geistkreis ("Mind Circle") was an informal Viennese seminar of science and ideas founded by Friedrich Hayek and Herbert Furth in the early 1920s, whose members included sociologist Alfred Schutz, philosopher Felix Kaufmann, economists Fritz Machlup, Gottfried Haberler and Oskar Morgenstern, political scientist Eric Voegelin, Friedrich Engel-Janosi, Franz Glück, mathematician Karl Menger, art historians Otto Benesch and Johannes Wilde, among others.

The members of the circle presented papers on mathematics, the natural science, sociology, history, philosophy, art, literature, neuroscience, economics, among other intellectual topics. The members met once or twice a month to discuss technical and theoretical subjects from across the world of ideas. The circle was first formed in 1921 and continued to meet in one form or another until 1938. Over the course of that period 25 individuals participated in the circle.
