= Friedrich Engel-Janosi =

Austrian-American historian

Friedrich Engel-Jánosi (18 February 1893 – 7 March 1978) was an Austrian historian. Born Friedrich Engel von Jánosi, he wrote under the name Engel-Janosi. A leading expert on the relationship between the Holy See and the Habsburg monarchy, he also wrote on Italian history, on the history of historiography, and on more general topics.

== Biography ==
Born to an ennobled Austrian Jewish family of industrialists, von Jánosi fought in the Austro-Hungarian Army during the First World War, winning the Silver Medal for Bravery. After completing doctorates in jurisprudence and in philosophy, he took up a position with the Lombard and Escompte Bank, working there until the bank collapsed in 1924. During this period, he published his first historical works, which were received favourably. He completed his habilitation and received his venia docendi from the University of Vienna in 1929, where he was given the title of "Außerordentlicher Professor" in 1935. During the 1920s, he was a member of The Geistkreis.

After an academic exchange in Rome in 1937 and 1938, during which he became a Roman Catholic, His venia docendi was rescinded in 1938 for racial reasons, and he fled to Switzerland in 1939 in the aftermath of the Anschluss. After stays in France and the United Kingdom, where he was briefly a lecturer at the University of Cambridge, he went to the United States, working at Johns Hopkins University, then the Catholic University of America, becoming a full professor at the latter.

Returning to Austria in 1949, he declined the offer of the chair for contemporary history at the University of Vienna. Owing to his age, he was made an honorary professor, but accorded all the rights of a full professor. In 1965, he served as the president of the International Committee of Historical Sciences.

Engel-Jánosi was awarded a Guggenheim Fellowship in 1955 and was elected a corresponding fellow of the British Academy. He was a recipient of the Austrian Decoration for Science and Art, First Class and of the Medal of Honor of the Federal Capital Vienna in gold.

== Works ==
- “Reflections of Lord Action on Historical Principles.” The Catholic Historical Review 27, no. 2 (1941): 166–85. http://www.jstor.org/stable/25014017.
- “Politics and History in the Age of the Enlightenment.” The Journal of Politics 5, no. 4 (1943): 363–90. https://doi.org/10.2307/2125294.
- “Two Austrian Ambassadors Discuss the Successor of Pius IX.” The Catholic Historical Review 30, no. 1 (1944): 1–27. http://www.jstor.org/stable/25014369.
- “The Return of Pius IX in 1850.” The Catholic Historical Review 36, no. 2 (1950): 129–62. http://www.jstor.org/stable/25015155.
- “French and Austrian Political Advice to Pius IX, 1846-1848.” The Catholic Historical Review 38, no. 1 (1952): 1–20. http://www.jstor.org/stable/25015382.
- “Austria and the Conclave of 1878.” The Catholic Historical Review 39, no. 2 (1953): 142–66. http://www.jstor.org/stable/25015571.
- “The Roman Question in the First Years of Benedict XV.” The Catholic Historical Review 40, no. 3 (1954): 269–85. http://www.jstor.org/stable/25015747.
