= Thomas M. Humphrey =

American economist (born 1935)

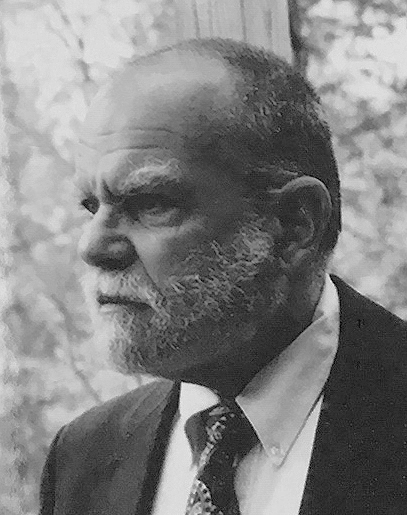
- Humphrey
- Born: March 8, 1935; Louisville, Kentucky
- Died: September 16, 2023 (aged 88)
- Other name: Thomas MacGillivray Humphrey
- Education: University of Tennessee (B.S, M.S); Tulane University (Ph.D)
- Occupations: Economist, author, Federal Reserve Bank of Richmond
- Years active: until 2005 (retired)
- Known for: History of monetary thought
- Spouse: Mitzi Greene Humphrey (married June 1957)

Thomas MacGillivray Humphrey (March 8, 1935 - September 16, 2023) was an American economist. Until 2005 he was a research advisor and senior economist in the research department of the Federal Reserve Bank of Richmond and editor of the bank's flagship publication, the Economic Quarterly. His publications cover macroeconomics, monetary economics, and the history of economic thought. Mark Blaug called him the "undisputed master" of British classical monetary thought.

== Writing and research ==
Humphrey has written books and journal articles on monetary policy history. He is the author of articles published in journals such as the Cato Journal, HOPE (History of Political Economy), Southern Economics Journal, and Econ Focus (formerly Region Focus). He wrote over 70 articles published in the journals of the Richmond Federal Reserve. Articles by Humphrey such as Rival Notions of Money may be freely accessed and downloaded at the Federal Reserve Bank of Richmond's website.

Humphrey was an editor of the Federal Reserve of Richmond Economic Quarterly, previously known as the Economic Review and before that as the Monthly Review. In 1998 his annual report for the Federal Reserve Bank of Richmond was Mercantilists and Classicals: Insights from Doctrinal History.

His first four books on the history of monetary thought were: The Monetary Approach to the Balance of Payments, Exchange Rates, and World Inflation (co-author Robert Keleher); Money, Banking and Inflation: Essays in the History of Monetary Thought; Money, Exchange and Production: Further Essays in the History of Economic Thought; and Essays on Inflation. Charles R. McCann Jr. stated, in reference to Humphrey's book Money, Banking and Inflation: Essays in the History of Monetary Thought that "monetary economists looking for an accessible introduction to their discipline's past will find few better starting points than this volume."(registration required)

In 2019 The Cato Institute published his fifth book, Gold, the Real Bills Doctrine, and the Fed: Sources of Monetary Disorder – 1922–1938, a collaboration between Humphrey and his co-author Richard H. Timberlake.

His writing on the history of economic thought was included in the first edition to the New Palgrave and in the later An Encyclopedia of Keynesian Economics to which he contributed an article on the Chicago School of Economics, and also in festschriften, book reviews, textbooks, annual reports, and anthologies. For Famous Figures in Diagrams and Economics by Mark Blaug and Peter Lloyd, Humphrey wrote the first chapter, Marshallian Cross Diagrams and Chapter 55, Intertemporal utility maximization – the Fisher diagram. Humphrey's works on monetary theory are cited in David Laidler's book Fabricating the Keynesian Revolution: Studies of the Inter-War Literature on Money, the Cycle, and Unemployment.

In 2006, Federal Reserve Chairman Ben S. Bernanke at the Fourth ECB Central Banking Conference, Frankfurt, Germany, cited Humphrey's article on the real bills doctrine. In 2008 Humphrey gave the Fourth Annual Ranlett Lecture in Economics at California State University, Sacramento, entitled Lender of Last Resort: The Concept in History. In 2009 Humphrey participated in the Adam Smith Program, Jepson School of Leadership Studies at the University of Richmond, where he presented The Fed's Deviation from Classical Thornton-Bagehot Lender-of-Last-Resort Policy, a paper co-authored with Richard Timberlake. At the 2010 Annual Meeting of the American Economics Association (AEA) in Atlanta, Georgia, his subject was The Lender of Last Resort in the History of Economic Thought. In February 2013, he wrote Working Paper No. 751 Arresting Financial Crises: The Fed Versus the Classicals for the Levy Economics Institute of Bard College, an essay which was subsequently presented at the 2013 Annual Meeting in Philadelphia of the American Economics Association. He wrote reviews of books by other writers on economic subjects, such as Sylvia Nasar, Arie Arnon, and Robert W. Dimand's "Irving Fisher (Great Thinkers in Economics)".

== Books ==
- The Monetary Approach to the Balance of Payments, Exchange Rates, and World Inflation (co-author Robert Keleher). ISBN 9780030559563
- Money, Banking and Inflation: Essays in the History of Monetary Thought. ISBN 9781852789411
- Money, Exchange, and Production: Further Essays in the History of Economic Thought. ISBN 1858986524
- Essays on Inflation. ISBN 0894990888
- Gold, the Real Bills Doctrine, and the Fed: Sources of Monetary Disorder 1922–1938. (co-author Richard H. Timberlake). ISBN 9781948647557

== See also ==
- List of economists
- List of Tulane University people
