= Curt Elze =

Curt Elze (16 February 1885 – 9 April 1972) was a German anatomist and professor at the universities of Rostock, Giessen, and Würzburg during the Third Reich. He headed the anatomical institute at Würzburg and was associated with Werner Heyde for the supply of execution victims for use in medical studies.

Elze was born in Halle, son of a namesake lawyer and Lina née Frenkel (1857–1936). He went to school in Halle and studied medicine at the Universities of Freiburg and Halle, graduating in 1907. He studied human embryology and development under Franz Julius Keibel (1861–1929) and received a doctorate in 1908 after which he worked at the University of Vienna under Ferdinand Hochstetter. He completed his habilitation at the University of Heidelberg and became a lecturer. During World War I he served as a military doctor and returned in 1916 to work at the Heidelberg Hospital. He served in Heidelberg until 1921 when he became a professor of anatomy at the University of Rostock. In 1931 he served as a rector and the next year as vice-rector. In 1934 he joined the Nazi teachers' association and in 1940 he became a NSDAP member (number 8007883). He became chair of anatomy at Giessen in 1936. From 1940 he was a professor at the University of Würzburg where he succeeded Hans Petersen as director of the anatomical institute. During this period the institute received numerous bodies of Nazi execution victims for their use in dissection and study. Elze collaborated with Hermann Braus on his anatomical atlas ("Anatomie des Menschen") and served as an editor for the Zeitschrift für Anatomie und Entwicklungsgeschichte. From 1940 the anatomical institute received 80 bodies from Werner Heyde who headed a Nazi euthanasia program. Elze would later claim during denazification that he took his membership to the Nazi party only due to pressure from the teachers.

Elze married Annemarie Keil (1892–1995) in 1916 and they had two sons and two daughters. He is buried in the Protestant Laurentiusfriedhof in Halle.
