= The Constitution of Liberty =

1960 book by Friedrich von Hayek

- First edition dust jacket
- Author: Friedrich Hayek
- Language: English
- Subject: Politics, Economics
- Publisher: University of Chicago Press (US)
- Publication date: 1960
- Publication place: United States
- Media type: Print
- Pages: 576
- ISBN: 0-226-32084-7

The Constitution of Liberty is a book written by Friedrich Hayek, first published in 1960 by the University of Chicago Press. Many scholars have considered The Constitution of Liberty as the most important work by Hayek.

== Background ==
In 1950, when Hayek moved to Chicago, he had been working on The Abuse and Decline of Reason essays for a while; some of the early findings had been published in Individualism and Economic Order (1948), and more would be published in The Counter-Revolution of Science (1952). He was interested in the connection between societal transformation and the manner in which scientific knowledge is presented. In comparison to being a member of the economics department, he fared substantially better on the Committee on Social Thought. On March 7, 1954, Hayek requested funding from the Guggenheim Foundation for his travels to Italy and Greece. He did this not only for his study of John Stuart Mill, but also because he believed that visiting these non-industrialized regions would help him better understand how tradition and culture develop in agrarian societies. He was concerned in the development of nonrational, but nonverbally explicit, rules and traditions. He planned to publish two books on the liberal order, The Constitution of Liberty and "The Creative Powers of a Free Civilization" (eventually the title for the second chapter of The Constitution of Liberty). He completed The Constitution of Liberty in May 1959, with publication in February 1960.

== Contents ==
According to Bruce Caldwell, the challenges posed by H. D. Dickinson and John Maynard Keynes to Hayek's ideas on political philosophy and economics, Dickinson asked for a positive program from opponents of collectivism, while Keynes wanted guidance on where to draw the line between good and bad government intervention. Hayek addressed these challenges in this book.

Hayek contrasts two approaches on liberty and reason; rationalistic and evolutionary. Rationalistic approaches emphasize deliberate design and control, and evolutionary perspectives stress the importance of tradition, spontaneous order, and the limitations of human reason. Due to the inherent complexity and unpredictability of human civilization, human reason must operate within the framework of societal evolution.

Hayek argues property rights are essential for preventing coercion. Coercion prevention is a primary function of the state, while moral rules and conventions exert pressure on behavior without constituting severe coercion. These noncoercive rules facilitate social interaction without severely impeding liberty. Hayek discusses the concept of law and its relationship to freedom within society. Law as a set of general, abstract rules that apply equally to everyone, provides a secure and free sphere for individual action. Hayek argues laws are characterized by their generality and abstractness, allowing individuals to make their own decisions within the framework provided by the law. Hayek also argued how laws serve to coordinate individual actions, help mutual cooperation, and establish order in society without the need for centralized direction. The rule of law is essential for preserving individual liberty and enabling effective social organization.

== Table of Contents ==
- Introduction

=== Part I – The Value of Freedom ===
- 1. Liberty and Liberties
- 2. The Creative Powers of a Free Civilization
- 3. The Common Sense of Progress
- 4. Freedom, Reason, and Tradition
- 5. Responsibility and Freedom
- 6. Equality, Value, and Merit
- 7. Majority Rule
- 8. Employment and Independence

=== Part II – Freedom and the Law ===
- 9. Coercion and the State
- 10. Law, Commands, and Order
- 11. The Origins of the Rule of Law
- 12. The American Contribution: Constitutionalism
- 13. Liberalism and Administration: The Rechtsstaat
- 14. The Safeguards of Individual Liberty
- 15. Economic Policy and the Rule of Law
- 16. The Decline of the Law

=== Part III – Freedom in the Welfare State ===
- 17. The Decline of Socialism and the Rise of the Welfare State
- 18. Labor Unions and Employment
- 19. Social Security
- 20. Taxation and Redistribution
- 21. The Monetary Framework
- 22. Housing and Town Planning
- 23. Agriculture and Natural Resources
- 24. Education and Research

Postscript: Why I am Not a Conservative

== Reception ==
Sidney Hook criticized Hayek's belief in the superiority of tradition over reason and his rejection of intelligent social control. Hook argued that history shows the dangers of relying solely on non-rational processes, and planning can coexist with democracy and freedom. Hook also criticizes Hayek's narrow definition of freedom and his binary thinking. While he acknowledged Hayek's value as a cautionary voice, he ultimately said that Hayek's economic philosophy could lead to disaster.

Lionel Robbins agreed with Hayek's emphasis on the non-rational element in social habits and institutions, but expressed concern that this emphasis may lead to indiscriminate acceptance and admiration of all institutions and habits, including those that are harmful. Robbins noted a contrast between Hume and Burke, with Hume being more willing to subject institutions to critical scrutiny based on public utility, while Burke's conservatism sometimes becomes indefensible. Robbins also disagreed with Hayek's classification of nineteenth century English Utilitarians as "false" Continental Rationalists, and argued that their thought was squarely within the tradition of English empiricism and not deserving of the label "false" liberalism. Robbins also suggested that Bentham and his followers were not doctrinaire individualists, but rather had nuanced views on economic organization and were not necessarily supportive of collectivization.

Frank Knight criticized Hayek for its lack of attention to the critical events and principles of the Liberal Revolution that established democratic societies, emphasizing the importance of democracy, political order, and rule of law. Knight criticized Hayek for being scornful towards politically organized freedom. Knight accused Hayek of making anarchist statements that exclude rulers and limit legislation logically, and that Hayek's criticisms of democracy imply that the government should do nothing unless to enforce universally known laws. He also criticized Hayek's treatment of equality, arguing that his extreme absolutism is a mistake. Knight further accused Hayek of reaching a supreme absurdity in his discussion of equality of opportunity, ignoring the role of social structures in shaping opportunities and the consequences of history and social forces on individual achievements.

Jacob Viner argued that Hayek's conclusions are unconditional because Hayek selected extreme positions to attack and works with a limited set of values. According to Viner, This approach can lead to logical fallacies, such as attacking a straw man or the fallacy of the unexplored remainder. He also questioned Hayek's doctrine appears similar to social Darwinism and historicism.

Ronald Hamowy criticized Hayek's views on coercion and the difficulty in defining it within his theoretical framework. He criticized Hayek's proposed framework, arguing that it allows for the concentration of power in the hands of the state and can lead to the overthrow of personal liberty. Hamowy concluded that Hayek's position on coercion and freedom must be rejected due to its inconsistencies. Hayek responded to Hamowy's criticism.

The Constitution of Liberty was notably held up at a British Conservative Party policy meeting and banged on the table by Margaret Thatcher, who reportedly interrupted a presentation to indicate, in reference to the book, that "This is what we believe".

The Constitution of Liberty was placed 9th on the list of the 100 best non-fiction books of the twentieth century compiled by the biweekly conservative magazine National Review.

== See also ==
- The Road To Serfdom (1944), Hayek's most well-known work.
