= Lawrence H. White =

American economist (born 1954)

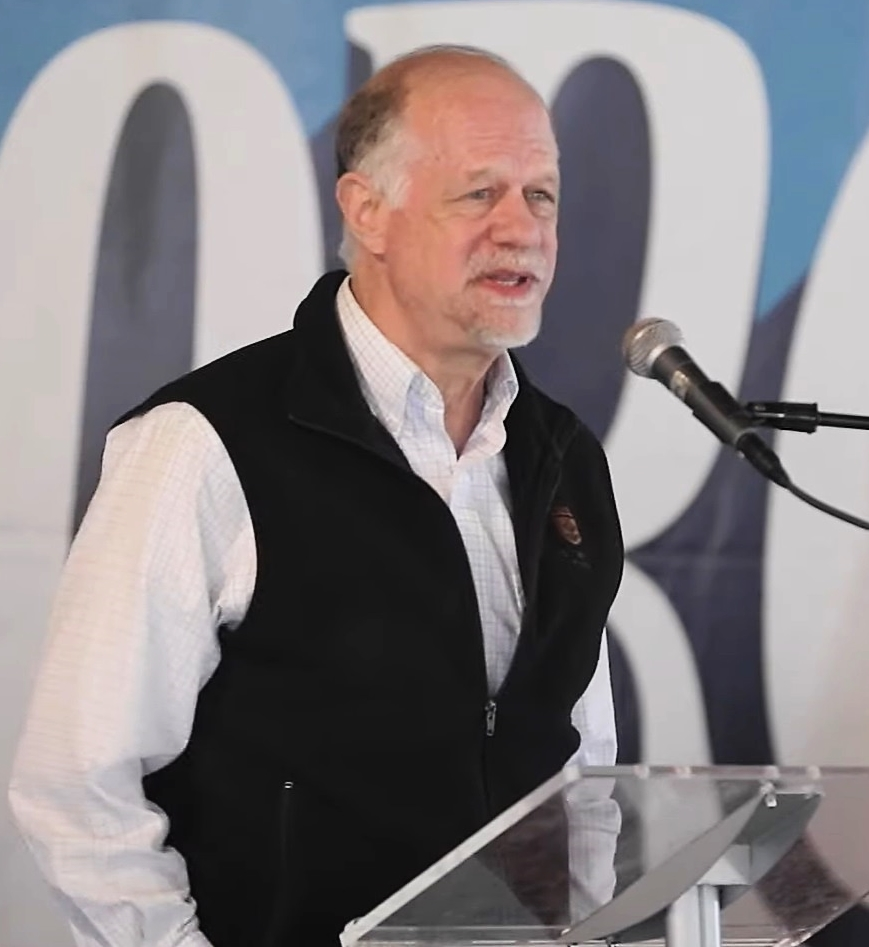
- White speaking at PorcFest in 2021
- Born: November 27, 1954 (age 71)

Academic background
- Influences: F. A. Hayek

Academic work
- Discipline: Monetary theory, banking history
- School or tradition: Free Banking
- Website: Information at IDEAS / RePEc

Lawrence Henry White (born November 27, 1954) is an American economics professor at George Mason University who teaches graduate level monetary theory and policy. He is considered an authority on the history and theory of free banking. His writings support the abolition of the Federal Reserve System and the promotion of private and competitive banking.

== Career ==
White earned his BA at Harvard University (1977) and PhD at the University of California at Los Angeles (1982). Before his current role at George Mason University he held a position as F. A. Hayek Professor of Economic History with the University of Missouri–St. Louis Economics department from 2000 to 2009, teaching American Economic History, Monetary Theory, and Money and Banking. Previously, he was assistant professor at New York University and associate professor at The University of Georgia in Athens, Georgia.

Articles by White on monetary theory and banking history have appeared in the American Economic Review, the Journal of Economic Literature, the Journal of Money, Credit, and Banking as well as other professional journals. White is an associate editor of the "Review of Austrian Economics", a contributing editor to the Foundation for Economic Education's magazine The Freeman, and an adjunct scholar of the Cato Institute.

== Economic views ==
White has been influenced by and writes about the Austrian School of Economics and considers himself an "economist who values the Austrian tradition." He has analyzed the theory and history of free banking, a system under which commercial banks and market forces control the provision of banking services. He supports "depoliticizing the supply of money," considers "free market monetary arrangements" feasible and argues that market monetary institutions "can more credibly be found by contract to perform as desired."

White's Free Banking in Britain analyzes the efficient systems of free banking in Scotland for 128 years until it was suppressed by the British Parliament which was having problems with its own banking system. The book brought respectability in academic economics to the idea of free banking. However, some supporters of free banking who prefer commodity backed currency to private fractional reserve currency disagree with his portrayal of the Scottish banking system as truly free. White has countered their arguments. However, White does not dismiss the possibility that in a free market people might prefer a commodity standard, such as the gold standard.

White's 1999 book The Theory of Monetary Institutions is a theoretical and historical account of both existing and alternative monetary regimes used as an advanced undergraduate and graduate-level economics text. Professor Steve Hanke writes that "White provides a uniquely insightful perspective into a difficult and controversial area, and his arguments and analysis are unbeatable."

White, who has been a visiting scholar at the Federal Reserve Bank of Atlanta, frequently has criticized the Federal Reserve System. He has written that the economics profession is greatly influenced by the Federal Reserve because of the millions of dollars in research grants it supplies to academics. White has been quoted as saying that nationalized banks "divert money to the most vote-productive uses rather than the most economically productive uses." White's view on the usefulness of transferring digital money via cellphone and on his criticism of Limited Purpose Banking have been mentioned in mainstream publications.

White received an Honorary Doctoral Degree at Universidad Francisco Marroquín in 2011 due his research on monetary policy and monetary history.

== Books ==
- Editor, Hayek, F. A.; White, Lawrence H. (2015). Capital and Interest. Collected Works of F. A. Hayek Volume XI. Chicago: The University of Chicago Press. doi:10.7208/chicago/9780226274904.001.0001. ISBN 978-0226274874.
- The Clash of Economic Ideas: The Great Policy Debates and Experiments of the Last Hundred Years, Cambridge, England: Cambridge University Press, 2012, ISBN 978-1107012424
- Editor, Pure Theory of Capital. Collected Works of F.A. Hayek Volume XII. London and New York: Routledge (Taylor & Francis). 2008.
- Editor, The History of Gold and Silver, 3 vols., London: Pickering and Chatto, 2000.
- The Theory of Monetary Institutions, Oxford: Basil Blackwell, 1999 ISBN 0631212140
- Free Banking in Britain: Theory, Experience and Debate 1800–1845 (2nd ed.). London: Institute of Economic Affairs. 1995. ISBN 0255363753.
- Editor, The Crisis in American Banking, New York: New York University Press, 1993
- Editor, Free Banking, 3 vols., Aldershot, UK: Edward Elgar, 1993
- Editor, African Finance: Research and Reform, San Francisco: ICS Press, 1993
- Competition and Currency: Essays on Free Banking and Money, New York: New York University Press, 1992, ISBN 0814792472
- Editor, William Leggett, Democratick Editorials: Essays in Jacksonian Political Economy, Indianapolis: Liberty Press, 1984
- Free Banking in Britain: Theory, experience and debate 1800–1845. Cambridge: Cambridge University Press. 1984. ISBN 978-0521258593 – via Internet Archive.
