= Friedrich Hayek =

Austrian economist and philosopher (1899–1992)

Friedrich Hayek CH FBA
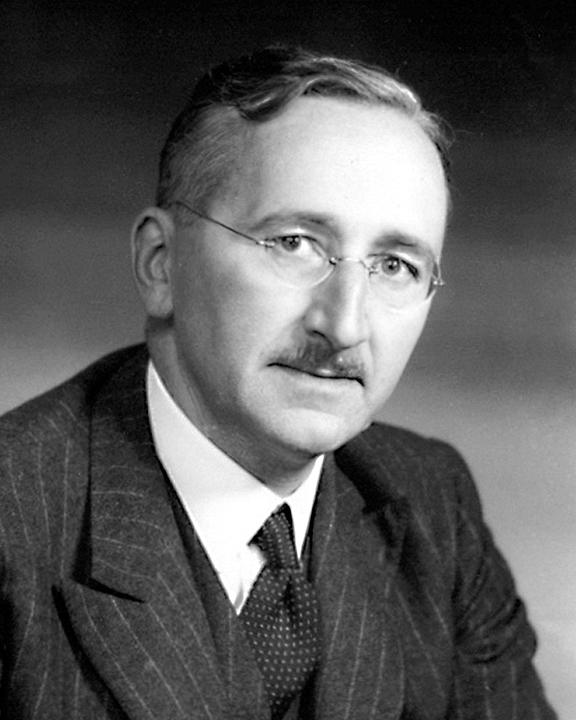
- Born: Friedrich August von Hayek; 8 May 1899; Vienna, Austria-Hungary
- Died: 23 March 1992 (aged 92); Freiburg im Breisgau, Germany
- Citizenship: Austria (until 1938); United Kingdom (from 1938)
- Spouses: Helen Berta Maria von Fritsch (m. 1926; div. 1950) Helene Bitterlich (m. 1950)
- Children: 3, including Laurence
- Father: August von Hayek
- Relatives: Heinrich von Hayek (brother); Gustav von Hayek (grandfather); Ludwig Wittgenstein (cousin)

Academic background
- Education: University of Vienna (Dr. jur., 1921; Dr. rer. pol, 1923)
- Influences: Acton; Belloc; Böhm-Bawerk; Benson; Burke; Carlyle; Chesterton; Darwin; Dickens; Eucken; Ferguson; Fetter; Franklin; Freud; Gibbon; Hume; Hugo; Hobbes; Jefferson; Keynes; Lewis; Locke; Mach; Mandeville; Marx; Maistre; Menger; Mill; Mises; Newman; Nietzsche; Orwell; Paine; Popper; Rousseau; Schmitt; Sidney; Smith; Spann; Tolkien; Tocqueville; Tucker; Twain; Voltaire; Wicksell; Wieser; Wittgenstein

Academic work
- Discipline: Political economy; Jurisprudence; Political philosophy
- School or tradition: Austrian School
- Institutions: London School of Economics (1931–1950); University of Chicago (1950–1962); University of Freiburg (1962–1968; 1978–1992); University of Salzburg (1969–1977)
- Notable ideas: Economic calculation problem; Dispersed knowledge; Price signal; Spontaneous order; Austrian Business Cycle Theory; Hayek–Hebb model; Hayekian triangle
- Awards: Nobel Memorial Prize in Economic Sciences (1974); Member of the Order of the Companions of Honour (1984); Presidential Medal of Freedom (1991)
- Website: Information at IDEAS / RePEc

Friedrich August von Hayek (Note: /ˈhaɪək/ HY-ək; German: [ˈfʁiːdʁɪç ˈaʊɡʊst fɔn ˈhaɪɛk]) (8 May 1899 – 23 March 1992) was an Austrian economist and philosopher. He is known for his contributions to political economy, political philosophy and intellectual history. Hayek shared the 1974 Nobel Memorial Prize in Economic Sciences with Gunnar Myrdal for work on money and economic fluctuations, and the interdependence of economic, social and institutional phenomena. His account of how prices communicate information is widely regarded as an important contribution to economics that led to his receiving the prize. He was a notable member of the Austrian school of economics.

During his teenage years, Hayek fought in World War I. He later said this experience, coupled with his desire to help avoid the mistakes that led to the war, drew him into economics. He earned doctoral degrees in law in 1921 and political studies in 1923 from the University of Vienna. He subsequently lived and worked in Austria, Great Britain, the United States and Germany. He became a British national in 1938. He studied and taught at the London School of Economics and later at the University of Chicago, before returning to Europe late in life to teach at the Universities of Salzburg and Freiburg.

Hayek had considerable influence on a variety of political and economic movements of the 20th century, and his ideas continue to influence thinkers from a variety of political and economic backgrounds today. Although sometimes described as a conservative, Hayek himself rejected this label and preferred to be thought of as a classical liberal or libertarian. His most popular work, The Road to Serfdom (1944), has been republished many times over the eight decades since its original publication.

Hayek was appointed a Member of the Order of the Companions of Honour in 1984 for his academic contributions to economics. He was the first recipient of the Hanns Martin Schleyer Prize in 1984. He also received the Presidential Medal of Freedom in 1991 from President George H. W. Bush. In 2011, his article "The Use of Knowledge in Society" (1945) was selected as one of the top 20 articles published in the American Economic Review during its first 100 years.

== Early life ==
Friedrich August von Hayek was born in Vienna to August von Hayek and Felicitas Hayek (née von Juraschek). The surname Hayek is derived from the Czech surname Hájek and can be traced to an ancestor with the surname "Hagek" who migrated from Prague in the 1500s.

His father, born in 1871, also in Vienna, was a medical doctor employed by the municipal health ministry. August was a part-time botany lecturer at the University of Vienna. Friedrich had two brothers, Heinrich (1900–1969) and Erich (1904–1986), who were one-and-a-half and five years younger than he.

His father's career as a university professor influenced Hayek's goals later in life. Both of his grandfathers, who lived long enough for Hayek to know them, were scholars. His maternal grandfather, Franz von Juraschek, was an economist in Austria-Hungary and a close friend of Eugen von Böhm-Bawerk, one of the founders of the Austrian School of Economics. Hayek's paternal grandfather, Gustav Edler von Hayek, taught natural sciences at the Imperial Realobergymnasium (secondary school) in Vienna. He wrote works in the field of biological systematics.

On his mother's side, Hayek was second cousin to the philosopher Ludwig Wittgenstein. His mother knew Wittgenstein well and often played with his sisters. As a result of the family relationship, Hayek was among the first to read Wittgenstein's Tractatus Logico-Philosophicus when that book was published in its original German edition in 1921. Although he met Wittgenstein on only a few occasions, Hayek said that Wittgenstein's philosophy and methods of analysis had a profound influence on his own life and thought. In his later years, Hayek recalled a discussion of philosophy with Wittgenstein when both were officers during World War I.

After Wittgenstein's death, Hayek had intended to write a biography of him; he worked on collecting family materials and later assisted biographers of Wittgenstein. He was related to Wittgenstein on the non-Jewish side of the Wittgenstein family. Since his youth, Hayek had frequently socialized with Jewish intellectuals, and he mentioned that people often speculated as to whether he too was of Jewish ancestry. That made him curious, so he spent some time researching his ancestors and found out that he had no Jewish ancestors within five generations.

Hayek displayed an intellectual and academic bent from a very young age and was an avid reader before entering school. However, he did quite poorly at school, due to his lack of interest and problems with teachers. He was at the bottom of his class in most subjects and once received failing grades in Latin, Greek and mathematics. He was very interested in theater, even attempting to write some tragedies, and in biology, regularly helping his father with botanical work. At his father's suggestion, as a teenager he read the genetic and evolutionary works of Hugo de Vries and August Weismann and the philosophical works of Ludwig Feuerbach, noting Goethe as his greatest early intellectual influence. In school, Hayek was much taken by one instructor's lectures on Aristotle's ethics. In his unpublished autobiographical notes, Hayek recalled a division between him and his younger brothers, whom he regarded as somehow of a different generation, despite their having been born only a few years after he was. He preferred to associate with adults.

In 1917, Hayek joined an artillery regiment in the Austro-Hungarian Army and fought on the Italian front. Hayek suffered damage to his hearing in his left ear during the war and was decorated for bravery.

Hayek's pursuit of an academic career was influenced by a desire to help avoid the mistakes that he saw as having led to the war. Hayek said of his experience: "The decisive influence was really World War I. It's bound to draw your attention to the problems of political organization".

== Education ==
At the University of Vienna, Hayek initially studied mostly philosophy, psychology and economics. The university allowed students to choose their subjects freely and there was not much obligatory written work, or tests except main exams at the end of the study. By the end of his studies Hayek became more interested in economics, mostly for financial and career reasons; he planned to combine law and economics to start a career in diplomatic service. He earned doctorates in law and political science in 1921 and 1923 respectively.

For a short time, when the University of Vienna closed he studied in Constantin von Monakow's Institute of Brain Anatomy, where Hayek spent much of his time staining brain cells. Hayek's time in Monakow's lab and his deep interest in the work of Ernst Mach inspired his first intellectual project, eventually published as The Sensory Order (1952). It located connective learning at the physical and neurological levels, rejecting the "sense data" associationism of the empiricists and logical positivists. Hayek presented his work to the private seminar he had created with Herbert Furth called the Geistkreis.

During Hayek's years at the University of Vienna, Carl Menger's work on the explanatory strategy of social science and Friedrich von Wieser's commanding presence in the classroom left a lasting influence on him. Upon the completion of his examinations, Hayek was hired by Ludwig von Mises on the recommendation of Wieser as a specialist for the Austrian government working on the legal and economic details of the Treaty of Saint-Germain-en-Laye. Between 1923 and 1924, Hayek worked as a research assistant to Professor Jeremiah Jenks of New York University, compiling macroeconomic data on the American economy and the operations of the Federal Reserve. He was influenced by Wesley Clair Mitchell and started a doctoral program on problems of monetary stabilization but didn't finish it. His time in America wasn't especially happy. He had very limited social contacts, missed the cultural life of Vienna, and was troubled by his poverty. His family's financial situation deteriorated significantly after the War.

Initially sympathetic to Wieser's democratic socialism, Hayek found Marxism rigid and unattractive, and his mild socialist phase lasted until he was about 23. Hayek's economic thinking shifted away from socialism and toward the classical liberalism of Carl Menger after reading von Mises' book Socialism. It was sometime after reading Socialism that Hayek began attending von Mises' private seminars, joining several of his university friends, including Fritz Machlup, Alfred Schutz, Felix Kaufmann and Gottfried Haberler, who were also participating in Hayek's own more general and private seminar. It was during this time that he also encountered and befriended noted political philosopher Eric Voegelin, with whom he retained a long-standing relationship.

== Career ==
=== London School of Economics ===
With the help of Mises, in the late 1920s, he founded and served as director of the Austrian Institute for Business Cycle Research before joining the faculty of the London School of Economics (LSE) in 1931 at the behest of Lionel Robbins. Upon his arrival in London, Hayek was quickly recognised as one of the leading economic theorists in the world and his development of the economics of processes in time and the co-ordination function of prices inspired the ground-breaking work of John Hicks, Abba P. Lerner and many others in the development of modern microeconomics.

In 1932, Hayek suggested that private investment in the public markets was a better road to wealth and economic co-ordination in Britain than government spending programs as argued in an exchange of letters with John Maynard Keynes, co-signed with Lionel Robbins and others in The Times. The nearly decade long deflationary depression in Britain dating from Winston Churchill's decision in 1925 to return Britain to the gold standard at the old pre-war and pre-inflationary par was the public policy backdrop for Hayek's dissenting engagement with Keynes over British monetary and fiscal policy. Keynes called Hayek's book Prices and Production "one of the most frightful muddles I have ever read", famously adding: "It is an extraordinary example of how, starting with a mistake, a remorseless logician can end in Bedlam".

Notable economists who studied with Hayek at the LSE in the 1930s and 1940s include Arthur Lewis, Ronald Coase, William Baumol, CH Douglas, John Kenneth Galbraith, Leonid Hurwicz, Abba Lerner, Nicholas Kaldor, George Shackle, Thomas Balogh, L. K. Jha, Arthur Seldon, Paul Rosenstein-Rodan and Oskar Lange. Some were supportive and some were critical of his ideas. Hayek also taught or tutored many other LSE students, including David Rockefeller.

In 1937, Hayek gave a summer course at the Geneva Graduate Institute, then a stronghold of neoliberal thought that was home to Ludwig von Mises. Unwilling to return to Austria after the Anschluss brought it under the control of Nazi Germany in 1938, Hayek remained in Britain. Hayek and his children became British subjects in 1938. He held this status for the remainder of his life, but he did not live in Great Britain after 1950. He lived in the United States from 1950 to 1962 and then mostly in Germany, but also briefly in Austria.

In 1947, Hayek was elected a Fellow of the Econometric Society.

=== The Road to Serfdom ===
Hayek was concerned about the general view in Britain's academia that fascism was a capitalist reaction to socialism and The Road to Serfdom arose from those concerns. In the book, Hayek "[warns] of the danger of tyranny that inevitably results from government control of economic decision-making through central planning." He further argues that the abandonment of individualism and classical liberalism inevitably leads to a loss of freedom, the creation of an oppressive society, the tyranny of a dictator, and the serfdom of the individual. Hayek challenged the view, popular among British Marxists, that fascism (including Nazism) was a capitalist reaction against socialism. He argued that fascism, Nazism, and state-socialism had common roots in central economic planning and empowering the state over the individual.

The title was inspired by the French classical liberal thinker Alexis de Tocqueville's writings on the "road to servitude". It was first published in Britain by Routledge in March 1944 and was quite popular, leading Hayek to call it "that unobtainable book" also due in part to wartime paper rationing. When it was published in the United States by the University of Chicago in September of that year, it achieved greater popularity than in Britain. At the instigation of editor Max Eastman, the American magazine Reader's Digest also published an abridged version in April 1945, enabling The Road to Serfdom to reach a far wider audience than academics. The book is widely popular among those advocating individualism and classical liberalism.

=== Chicago ===
In 1950, Hayek left the London School of Economics. After spending the 1949–1950 academic year as a visiting professor at the University of Arkansas, Hayek became a professor at the University of Chicago's Committee on Social Thought. Hayek's salary was funded not by the university but by an outside foundation, the William Volker Fund.

Hayek had made contact with many at the University of Chicago in the 1940s, with Hayek's The Road to Serfdom playing a seminal role in transforming how Milton Friedman and others understood the workings of society. Hayek conducted a number of influential faculty seminars while at the University of Chicago, and a number of academics worked on research projects sympathetic to Hayek's own, such as Aaron Director, who was active in the Chicago School in helping to fund and establish what became the University of Chicago Law School's "Law and Society" program. Hayek, Frank Knight, Friedman and George Stigler worked together in forming the Mont Pèlerin Society, an international forum for neoliberals. Hayek and Friedman cooperated in support of the Intercollegiate Society of Individualists, later renamed the Intercollegiate Studies Institute, an American student organisation devoted to libertarian ideas.

Although they shared most political beliefs, disagreeing primarily on monetary policy, Hayek and Friedman worked in separate university departments with different research interests and never developed a close working relationship. According to Alan O. Ebenstein, who wrote biographies of both of them, Hayek may have had a closer friendship with Keynes than with Friedman. Another influential political philosopher and German-speaking exile at the University of Chicago at the time was Leo Strauss, but according to his student Joseph Cropsey, who also knew Hayek, there was no contact between the two.

Hayek received a Guggenheim Fellowship in 1954.

After editing a book on John Stuart Mill's letters, he planned to publish two books on the liberal order, The Constitution of Liberty and "The Creative Powers of a Free Civilization" (eventually the title for the second chapter of The Constitution of Liberty). He completed The Constitution of Liberty in May 1959, with publication in February 1960. Hayek was concerned with "that condition of men in which coercion of some by others is reduced as much as is possible in society" and was disappointed that the book received a poor reception.

He left Chicago mostly for financial reasons, complaining about his pension provisions. He supplemented his salary with additional money from book royalties but avoided other lucrative sources of income for academics, such as writing textbooks. Much of his income was spent on his frequent travels, regularly spending summers in the Austrian Alps, usually in the Tyrolean village of Obergurgl, where he enjoyed mountain climbing. He also visited Japan four times, with additional trips to Tahiti, Fiji, Indonesia, Australia, New Caledonia and Ceylon. After his divorce, his financial situation worsened.

=== Freiburg and Salzburg ===
From 1962 until his retirement in 1968, he was a professor at the University of Freiburg, West Germany, where he began work on his next book, Law, Legislation and Liberty. Hayek regarded his years at Freiburg as "very fruitful". Following his retirement, Hayek spent a year as a visiting professor of philosophy at the University of California, Los Angeles, where he continued work on Law, Legislation and Liberty, teaching a graduate seminar by the same name and another on the philosophy of social science. Preliminary drafts of the book were completed by 1970, but Hayek chose to rework his drafts and finally brought the book to publication in three volumes in 1973, 1976 and 1979.

Hayek became a professor at the University of Salzburg from 1969 to 1977 and then returned to Freiburg. When Hayek left Salzburg in 1977, he wrote: "I made a mistake in moving to Salzburg". The economics department was small, and the library facilities were inadequate.

Although Hayek's health suffered, and he fell into a depressive bout, he continued to work on his magnum opus, Law, Legislation and Liberty in periods when he was feeling better.

=== Nobel Memorial Prize ===
On 9 October 1974, it was announced that Hayek would be awarded the Nobel Memorial Prize in Economics with Swedish economist Gunnar Myrdal. He was surprised at being given the award and believed that he was given it with Myrdal to balance the award with someone from the opposite side of the political spectrum.

Among the reasons given, the committee stated, Hayek "was one of the few economists who gave warning of the possibility of a major economic crisis before the great crash came in the autumn of 1929." The following year, Hayek further confirmed his original prediction. An interviewer asked, "We understand that you were one of the only economists to forecast that America was headed for a depression, is that true?" Hayek responded, "Yes." However, no textual evidence has emerged of "a prediction". Indeed, Hayek wrote on 26 October 1929, three days before the crash, "at present there is no reason to expect a sudden crash of the New York stock exchange. ... The credit possibilities/conditions are, at any rate, currently very great, and therefore it appears assured that an outright crisis-like destruction of the present high [price] level should not be feared."

During the Nobel ceremony in December 1974, Hayek met the Russian dissident Aleksandr Solzhenitsyn. Hayek later sent him a Russian translation of The Road to Serfdom. He spoke with apprehension at his award speech about the danger the authority of the prize would lend to an economist, but the prize brought much greater public awareness to the then controversial ideas of Hayek and was described by his biographer as "the great rejuvenating event in his life".

=== British politics ===
In February 1975, Margaret Thatcher was elected leader of the British Conservative Party. The Institute of Economic Affairs arranged a meeting between Hayek and Thatcher in London soon after. During Thatcher's only visit to the Conservative Research Department in the summer of 1975, a speaker had prepared a paper on why the "middle way" was the pragmatic path the Conservative Party should take, avoiding the extremes of left and right. Before he had finished, Thatcher "reached into her briefcase and took out a book. It was Hayek's The Constitution of Liberty. Interrupting our pragmatist, she held the book up for all of us to see. 'This', she said sternly, 'is what we believe', and banged Hayek down on the table".

Despite the media depictions of him as Thatcher's guru and power behind the throne, the communication between him and the Prime Minister was not very regular, they were in contact only once or twice a year. Besides Thatcher, Hayek also had a significant influence on Enoch Powell, Keith Joseph, Nigel Lawson, Geoffrey Howe and John Biffen.

Hayek gained some controversy in 1978 by praising Thatcher's anti-immigration policy proposal in an article which ignited numerous accusations of antisemitism and racism because of his reflections on the inability of assimilation of Eastern European Jews in the Vienna of his youth. He defended himself by explaining that he made no racial judgements, only highlighted the problems of acculturation.

In 1977, Hayek was critical of the Lib–Lab pact in which the British Liberal Party agreed to keep the British Labour government in office. Writing to The Times, Hayek said: "May one who has devoted a large part of his life to the study of the history and the principles of liberalism point out that a party that keeps a socialist government in power has lost all title to the name 'Liberal'. Certainly no liberal can in future vote 'Liberal'". Hayek was criticised by Liberal politicians Gladwyn Jebb and Andrew Phillips, who both claimed that the purpose of the pact was to discourage socialist legislation.

Jebb pointed out that the German Free Democrats were in coalition with the German Social Democrats. Hayek was defended by Professor Antony Flew, who stated that—unlike the British Labour Party—the German Social Democrats had since the late 1950s abandoned public ownership of the means of production, distribution and exchange and had instead embraced the social market economy.

In 1978, Hayek came into conflict with Liberal Party leader David Steel, who argued that liberty was possible only with "social justice and an equitable distribution of wealth and power, which in turn require a degree of active government intervention" and that the Conservative Party were more concerned with the connection between liberty and private enterprise than between liberty and democracy. Hayek argued that a limited democracy might be better than other forms of limited government at protecting liberty, but that an unlimited democracy was worse than other forms of unlimited government because "its government loses the power even to do what it thinks right if any group on which its majority depends thinks otherwise".

Hayek stated that if the Conservative leader had said "that free choice is to be exercised more in the market place than in the ballot box, she has merely uttered the truism that the first is indispensable for individual freedom while the second is not: free choice can at least exist under a dictatorship that can limit itself but not under the government of an unlimited democracy which cannot".

Hayek supported Britain in the Falklands War, writing that it would be justified to attack Argentinian territory instead of just defending the islands, which earned him a lot of criticism in Argentina, a country which he also visited several times. He was also displeased by the weak response of the United States to the Iran hostage crisis, claiming that an ultimatum should be issued and Iran bombed if they do not comply. He supported Ronald Reagan's decision to keep high defence spending, believing that a strong US military is a guarantee of world peace and necessary to keep the Soviet Union under control. President Reagan listed Hayek as among the two or three people who most influenced his philosophy and welcomed him to the White House as a special guest. Senator Barry Goldwater listed Hayek as his favourite political philosopher and congressman Jack Kemp named him an inspiration for his political career.

=== Recognition ===
In 1980, Hayek was one of twelve Nobel laureates to meet with Pope John Paul II "to dialogue, discuss views in their fields, communicate regarding the relationship between Catholicism and science, and 'bring to the Pontiff's attention the problems which the Nobel Prize Winners, in their respective fields of study, consider to be the most urgent for contemporary man'".

Hayek was appointed a Member of the Order of the Companions of Honour (CH) in the 1984 Birthday Honours on the advice of British Prime Minister Margaret Thatcher for his "services to the study of economics". Hayek had hoped to receive a baronetcy and after being awarded the CH sent a letter to his friends requesting that he be called the English version of Friedrich (i.e. Frederick) from now on. After his twenty-minute audience with the Queen, he was "absolutely besotted" with her according to his daughter-in-law Esca Hayek. Hayek said a year later that he was "amazed by her. That ease and skill, as if she'd known me all my life". The audience with the Queen was followed by a dinner with family and friends at the Institute of Economic Affairs. When later that evening Hayek was dropped off at the Reform Club, he commented: "I've just had the happiest day of my life".

In 1991, President George H. W. Bush awarded Hayek the Presidential Medal of Freedom, one of the two highest civilian awards in the United States, for a "lifetime of looking beyond the horizon".

== Personal life ==
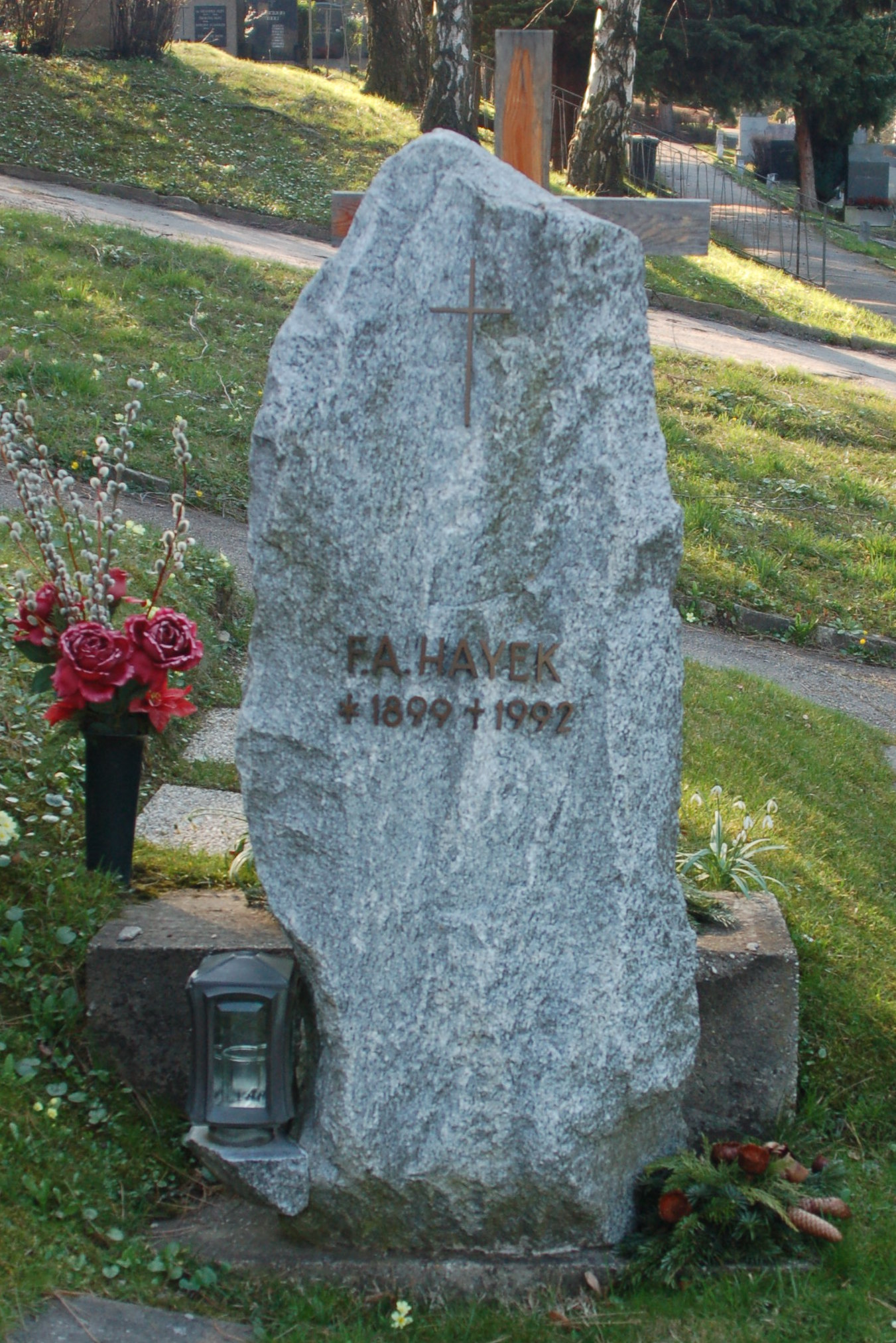
Hayek's grave in Neustifter Friedhof, Vienna

In August 1926, Hayek married Helen Berta Maria von Fritsch (1901–1960), a secretary at the civil service office where he worked. They had two children together. Upon the close of World War II, Hayek restarted a relationship with an old girlfriend, who had married since they first met, but kept it secret until 1948. Hayek and Fritsch divorced in July 1950 and he married his third cousin Helene Bitterlich (1900–1996) just a few weeks later, after moving to Arkansas to take advantage of permissive divorce laws. His wife and children were offered settlement and compensation for accepting a divorce. The divorce caused a scandal at LSE, where some academics refused to have anything to do with Hayek. In a 1978 interview to explain his actions, Hayek stated that he was unhappy in his first marriage and as his wife would not grant him a divorce he had taken steps to obtain one unilaterally.

For a time after his divorce, Hayek rarely visited his children, but kept up more regular contact with them in his older years after moving to Europe. Hayek's son, Laurence Hayek (1934–2004) was a distinguished microbiologist. His daughter Christine was an entomologist at the British Museum of Natural History, and she cared for him during his last years, when he had declining health.

Hayek had a lifelong interest in biology and was also concerned with ecology and environmental protection. After being awarded his Nobel Prize, he offered his name to be used for endorsements by World Wildlife Fund, National Audubon Society, and the National Trust, a British conservationist organisation. Evolutionary biology was simply one of his interests in natural sciences. Hayek also had an interest in epistemology, which he often applied to his own thinking, as a social scientist. He held that methodological differences in the social sciences and in natural sciences were key to understanding why incompetent policies are often allowed.

Hayek was brought up in a non-religious setting and decided from age 15 that he was an agnostic.

Hayek died on 23 March 1992, aged 92, in Freiburg, Germany, where he had lived since leaving Chicago in 1961. Despite his advanced age by the 1980s, he continued to write, even purportedly finishing a book, The Fatal Conceit, in 1988, although its actual authorship is unclear. He was buried on 4 April in the Neustift am Walde cemetery in the northern outskirts of Vienna according to the Catholic rite.

== Work and views ==
=== Business cycle ===
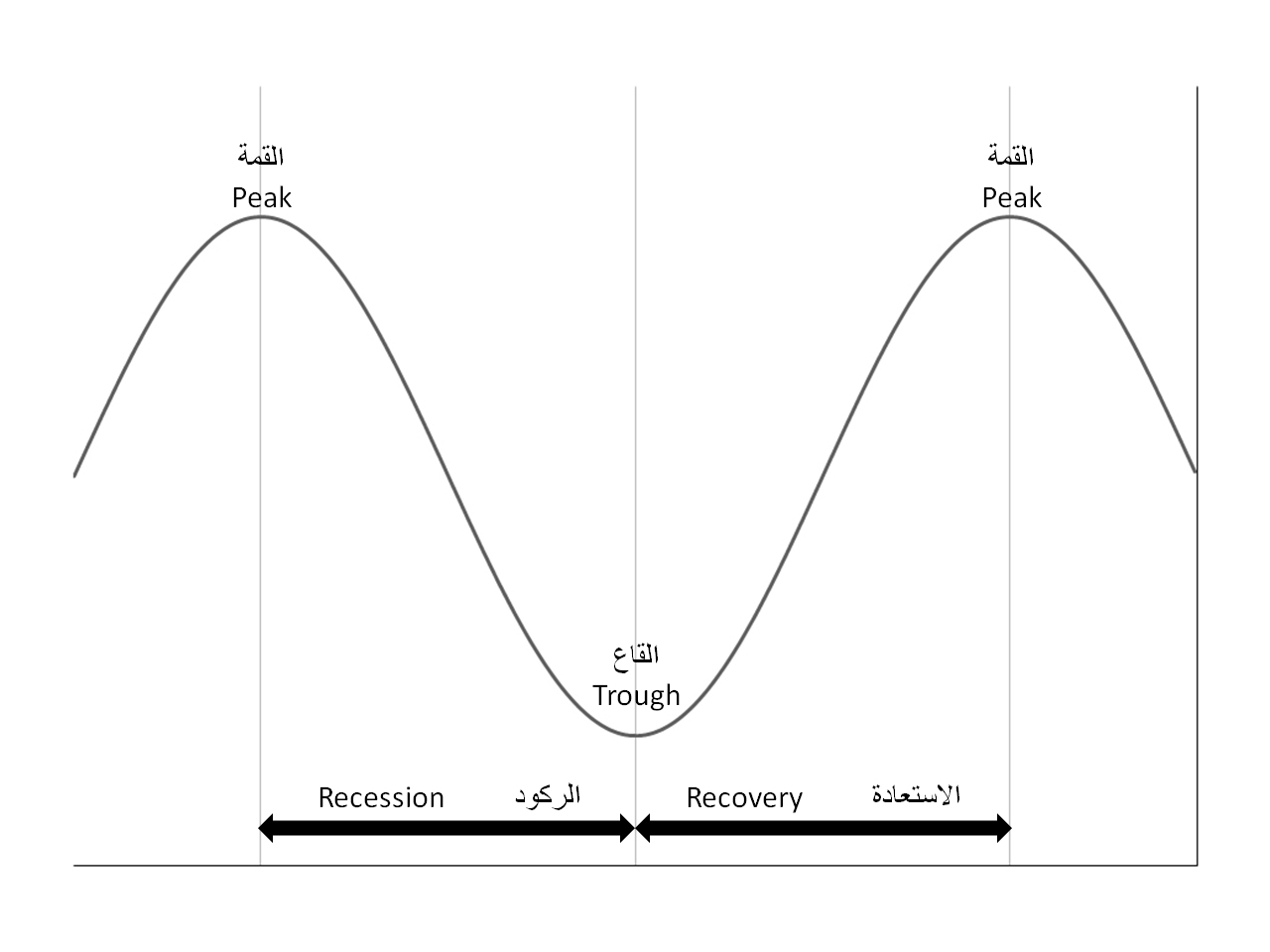
Parts of a business cycle

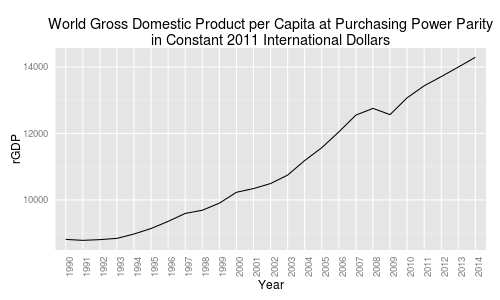
Actual business cycle

Ludwig von Mises had earlier applied the concept of marginal utility to the value of money in his Theory of Money and Credit (1912) in which he also proposed an explanation for "industrial fluctuations" based on the ideas of the old British Currency School and of Swedish economist Knut Wicksell. Hayek used this body of work as a starting point for his own interpretation of the business cycle, elaborating what later became known as the Austrian theory of the business cycle. Hayek spelled out the Austrian approach in more detail in his book, published in 1929, an English translation of which appeared in 1933 as Monetary Theory and the Trade Cycle. There, Hayek argued for a monetary approach to the origins of the cycle. In his Prices and Production (1931), Hayek argued that the business cycle resulted from the central bank's inflationary credit expansion and its transmission over time, leading to a capital misallocation caused by the artificially low interest rates. Hayek argued that "the past instability of the market economy is the consequence of the exclusion of the most important regulator of the market mechanism, money, from itself being regulated by the market process".

Hayek's analysis was based on Eugen Böhm von Bawerk's concept of the "average period of production" and on the effects that monetary policy could have upon it. In accordance with the reasoning later outlined in his essay "The Use of Knowledge in Society" (1945), Hayek argued that a monopolistic governmental agency like a central bank can neither possess the relevant information which should govern supply of money, nor have the ability to use it correctly.

In 1929, Lionel Robbins assumed the helm of the London School of Economics (LSE). Eager to promote alternatives to what he regarded as the narrow approach of the school of economic thought that then dominated the English-speaking academic world (centred at the University of Cambridge and deriving largely from the work of Alfred Marshall), Robbins invited Hayek to join the faculty at LSE, which he did in 1931. According to Nicholas Kaldor, Hayek's theory of the time-structure of capital and of the business cycle initially "fascinated the academic world" and appeared to offer a less "facile and superficial" understanding of macroeconomics than the Cambridge school's.

Also in 1931, Hayek crititicised John Maynard Keynes's Treatise on Money (1930) in his "Reflections on the pure theory of Mr. J.M. Keynes" and published his lectures at the LSE in book form as Prices and Production. For Keynes, unemployment and idle resources are caused by a lack of effective demand, but for Hayek they stem from a previous unsustainable episode of easy money and artificially low interest rates. Keynes asked his friend Piero Sraffa to respond. Sraffa elaborated on the effect of inflation-induced "forced savings" on the capital sector and about the definition of a "natural" interest rate in a growing economy (see Sraffa–Hayek debate). Others who responded negatively to Hayek's work on the business cycle included John Hicks, Frank Knight and Gunnar Myrdal, who, later on, would share the Sveriges-Riksbank Prize in Economics with him. Kaldor later wrote that Hayek's Prices and Production had produced "a remarkable crop of critics" and that the total number of pages in British and American journals dedicated to the resulting debate "could rarely have been equalled in the economic controversies of the past".

Hayek's work, throughout the 1940s, was largely ignored, except for scathing critiques by Nicholas Kaldor. Lionel Robbins himself, who had embraced the Austrian theory of the business cycle in The Great Depression (1934), later regretted having written the book and accepted many of the Keynesian counter-arguments.

Hayek never produced the book-length treatment of "the dynamics of capital" that he had promised in the Pure Theory of Capital. At the University of Chicago, Hayek was not part of the economics department and did not influence the rebirth of neoclassical theory that took place there (see Chicago school of economics). When in 1974 he shared the Nobel Memorial Prize in Economics with Myrdal, the latter complained about being paired with an "ideologue". Milton Friedman declared himself "an enormous admirer of Hayek, but not for his economics". Milton Friedman also commented on some of his writings, saying "I think Prices and Production is a very flawed book. I think his [Pure Theory of Capital] is unreadable. On the other hand, The Road to Serfdom is one of the great books of our time".

=== Central banking ===
Hayek was a staunch critic of central banking stating, "I doubt whether it has ever done any good except to the rulers and their favorites," and concluding that "money is certainly too dangerous an instrument to leave to the fortuitous expediency of politicians." As alternative systems, Hayek supports free banking and a free and private market in currency which would tend to naturally emphasize sound money over fiat currency. Hayek offered praise to the gold standard stating,

"With the exception only of the 200 year period of the gold standard, practically all governments of history have used their exclusive power to issue money in order to defraud and plunder the people."

— F.A. Hayek, Choice in Currency

Following the collapse of the Bretton Woods system and the 1970s inflation surge, Hayek stated that he hoped for, "complete freedom to deal in any money one likes [to] be regarded as the essential mark of a free country."

"The Denationalisation of Money" is one of his literary works, in which he advocated the establishment of competitions in issuing moneys.

=== Economic calculation problem ===
Building on the earlier work of Mises and others, Hayek also argued that while in centrally planned economies an individual or a select group of individuals must determine the distribution of resources, these planners will never have enough information to carry out this allocation reliably. This argument, first proposed by Max Weber and Ludwig von Mises, says that the efficient exchange and use of resources can be maintained only through the price mechanism in free markets (see economic calculation problem).

In 1935, Hayek published Collectivist Economic Planning, a collection of essays from an earlier debate that had been initiated by Mises. Hayek included Mises's essay in which Mises argued that rational planning was impossible under socialism.

Socialist Oskar Lange responded by invoking general equilibrium theory, which they argued disproved Mises's thesis. They noted that the difference between a planned and a free market system lay in who was responsible for solving the equations. They argued that if some of the prices chosen by socialist managers were wrong, gluts or shortages would appear, signalling them to adjust the prices up or down, just as in a free market. Through such a trial and error, a socialist economy could mimic the efficiency of a free market system while avoiding its many problems.

Hayek challenged this vision in a series of contributions. In "Economics and Knowledge" (1937), he pointed out that the standard equilibrium theory assumed that all agents have full and correct information, and how, in his mind, in the real world different individuals have different bits of knowledge and furthermore some of what they believe is wrong.

In "The Use of Knowledge in Society" (1945), Hayek argued that the price mechanism serves to share and synchronise local and personal knowledge, allowing society's members to achieve diverse and complicated ends through a principle of spontaneous self-organization. He contrasted the use of the price mechanism with central planning, arguing that the former allows for more rapid adaptation to changes in particular circumstances of time and place. Thus, Hayek set the stage for Oliver Williamson's later contrast between markets and hierarchies as alternative co-ordination mechanisms for economic transactions. He used the term catallaxy to describe a "self-organizing system of voluntary co-operation". Hayek's research into this argument was specifically cited by the Nobel Committee in its press release awarding Hayek the Nobel prize.

=== Investment and choice ===
Hayek made breakthroughs in the choice theory, and examined the inter-relations between non-permanent production goods and "latent" or potentially economic permanent resources, building on the choice theoretical insight that "processes that take more time will evidently not be adopted unless they yield a greater return than those that take less time".

=== Philosophy of science ===
During World War II, Hayek began the Abuse of Reason project. His goal was to show how a number of then-popular doctrines and beliefs had a common origin in some fundamental misconceptions about the social science.

Ideas were developed in The Counter-Revolution of Science in 1952 and in some of Hayek's later essays in the philosophy of science such as "Degrees of Explanation" (1955) and "The Theory of Complex Phenomena" (1964).

In Counter-Revolution, for example, Hayek observed that the hard sciences attempt to remove the "human factor" to obtain objective and strictly controlled results:

[T]he persistent effort of modern Science has been to get down to 'objective facts', to cease studying what men thought about nature or regarding the given concepts as true images of the real world, and, above all, to discard all theories which pretended to explain phenomena by imputing to them a directing mind like our own. Instead, its main task became to revise and reconstruct the concepts formed from ordinary experience on the basis of a systematic testing of the phenomena, so as to be better able to recognize the particular as an instance of a general rule.

— Friedrich Hayek, The Counter-Revolution of Science (Chapter II, "The Problem and the Method of the Natural Sciences")

Meanwhile, the soft sciences are attempting to measure human action itself:

The social sciences in the narrower sense, i.e., those which used to be described as the moral sciences, are concerned with man's conscious or reflected action, actions where a person can be said to choose between various courses open to him, and here the situation is essentially different. The external stimulus which may be said to cause or occasion such actions can of course also be defined in purely physical terms. But if we tried to do so for the purposes of explaining human action, we would confine ourselves to less than we know about the situation.

— Friedrich Hayek, The Counter-Revolution of Science (Chapter III, "The Subjective Character of the Data of the Social Sciences")

He notes that these are mutually exclusive and that social sciences should not attempt to impose positivist methodology, nor to claim objective or definite results:

=== Psychology ===
Hayek's first academic essay was a psychological work titled "Contributions to the Theory of the Development of Consciousness" (Beiträge zur Theorie der Entwicklung des Bewußtseins) In The Sensory Order: An Inquiry into the Foundations of Theoretical Psychology (1952), Hayek independently developed a "Hebbian learning" model of learning and memory—an idea he first conceived in 1920 prior to his study of economics. Hayek's expansion of the "Hebbian synapse" construction into a global brain theory received attention in neuroscience, cognitive science, computer science and evolutionary psychology by scientists such as Gerald Edelman, Vittorio Guidano and Joaquin Fuster.

The Sensory Order can be viewed as a development of his attack on scientism. Hayek posited two orders, namely the sensory order that we experience and the natural order that natural science revealed. Hayek thought that the sensory order actually is a product of the brain. He described the brain as a very complex yet self-ordering hierarchical classification system, a huge network of connections. Because of the nature of the classifier system, richness of our sensory experience can exist. Hayek's description posed problems to behaviorism, whose proponents took the sensory order as fundamental.

=== International relations ===
Hayek was a lifelong federalist. He joined several pan-European and federalist movements throughout his career, and called for federal ties between the U.K. and Europe, and between Europe and the United States. After the 1950s, when the Cold War began in earnest, Hayek largely kept his federalist proposals out of the public sphere, although he did propose to federate Jerusalem as late as the 1970s.

Hayek argued that closer economic ties without closer political ties would lead to more problems because interest groups in nation-states would best be able to counter the internationalisation of markets that comes with closer economic ties by appealing to nationalism. Much of his time in the pro-federalist and pan-European groups was spent arguing with pro-federal and pan-European democratic socialists over the proper extent of a world federal government. Hayek argued that such a world government should do little more than act as a negative check on national sovereignties and serve as a focal point for collective defense.

As the Cold War heated up, Hayek grew more hawkish and he pushed his federal proposals aside in favour of more traditional public policy proposals that acknowledged and respected the sovereignty of nation-states. Yet Hayek never disavowed his famous call for "the abrogation of national sovereignties" and his lifetime of work in the area of international relations continues to attract attention from scholars searching for federalist answers to contemporary problems in international relations.

=== Social and political philosophy ===
==== Two traditions in the theory of liberty ====
In the latter half of his career, Hayek made a number of contributions to social and political philosophy which he based on his views on the limits of human knowledge and the idea of spontaneous order in social institutions. He argues in favour of a society organised around a market order in which the apparatus of state is employed almost (though not entirely) exclusively to enforce the legal order (consisting of abstract rules and not particular commands) necessary for a market of free individuals to function. These ideas were informed by a moral philosophy derived from epistemological concerns regarding the inherent limits of human knowledge. Hayek argued that his ideal individualistic and free-market polity would be self-regulating to such a degree that it would be "a society which does not depend for its functioning on our finding good men for running it".

Hayek discusses the contrasting traditions of liberty—British and French—in the theory of freedom. The British tradition, influenced by thinkers like David Hume and Adam Smith, emphasises the organic growth of institutions and the spontaneous evolution of society. It recognises that political order arises from the cumulative experience and success of individuals, rather than from deliberate design. In contrast, the French tradition, rooted in Cartesian rationalism, seeks to construct a utopia based on a belief in the unlimited powers of human reason. The French tradition, that Hayek called constructivist rationalism, gained influence over time, partly due to its assumptions about human ambition and pride. However, according to Hayek, the British tradition, with its emphasis on the gradual development of civilization and the role of individual freedom, provides a more valid theory of liberty.

==== Spontaneous order ====
Hayek viewed the free price system not as a conscious invention (intentionally designed by humans), but as spontaneous order or what Scottish philosopher Adam Ferguson referred to in 1767 as "the result of human action but not of human design". For instance, Hayek put the price mechanism on the same level as language, an idea which he developed in his price-signal theory.

The Fatal Conceit (1988) recapitulates the Enlightenment-era assumption that the birth of civilisation relies on private property. Hayek holds that price signals are the only means of enabling each economic decision-maker to communicate tacit knowledge or dispersed knowledge to each other to solve the economic calculation problem. Alain de Benoist of the Nouvelle Droite (New Right) produced a highly critical essay on Hayek's work in a 1998 issue of Telos, citing the flawed assumptions behind Hayek's idea of "spontaneous order" and the authoritarian and totalising implications of his free-market ideology.

Andy Lamey has applied Hayek's concept of the market as a spontaneous order to ecosystems to defend a broadly non-interventionist policy. Like the market, ecosystems contain complex networks of information, involve an ongoing dynamic process, and contain orders within orders; the entire system operates without being directed by a conscious mind. On this analysis, species takes the place of price as a visible element of the system formed by a complex set of largely unknowable elements. Human ignorance about the countless interactions between the organisms of an ecosystem limits humans' ability to manipulate nature.

Hayek's price-signal concept is in relation to how consumers are often unaware of specific events that change a market, yet change their decisions, simply because the price goes up. Thus pricing communicates information.

Though Hayek did argue that the state should provide law centrally, others have pointed out that this contradicts his arguments about the role of judges in "discovering" the law, suggesting that Hayek would have supported decentralized provision of legal services.

==== Criticism of collectivism ====
Hayek was one of the leading academic critics of collectivism in the 20th century. In Hayek's view, the central role of the state should be to maintain the rule of law, with as little arbitrary intervention as possible. In his popular book The Road to Serfdom (1944) and in subsequent academic works, Hayek argued that socialism required central economic planning and that such planning in turn leads towards totalitarianism.

In The Road to Serfdom, Hayek wrote:

Although our modern socialists' promise of greater freedom is genuine and sincere, in recent years observer after observer has been impressed by the unforeseen consequences of socialism, the extraordinary similarity in many respects of the conditions under "communism" and "fascism".

Hayek posited that a central planning authority would have to be endowed with powers that would impact and ultimately control social life because the knowledge required for centrally planning an economy is inherently decentralised, and would need to be brought under control.

Hayek's argument has been criticized as a slippery slope argument and therefore fallacious. Peter Boettke has argued that this is a fundamental misunderstanding of the book and Hayek's point is about what central planning directly entails, not what it is likely to lead to.

==== Social safety nets ====
With regard to a social safety net, Hayek advocated "some provision for those threatened by the extremes of indigence or starvation due to circumstances beyond their control" and argued that the "necessity of some such arrangement in an industrial society is unquestioned—be it only in the interest of those who require protection against acts of desperation on the part of the needy". Summarizing Hayek's views on the topic, journalist Nicholas Wapshott has argued that "[Hayek] advocated mandatory universal health care and unemployment insurance, enforced, if not directly provided, by the state". Critical theorist Bernard Harcourt has argued further that "Hayek was adamant about this". In 1944, Hayek wrote in The Road to Serfdom:

There is no reason why in a society which has reached the general level of wealth which ours has attained that security against severe physical privation, the certainty of a given minimum of sustenance for all; or more briefly, the security of a minimum income should not be guaranteed to all without endangering general freedom. There are difficult questions about the precise standard which should thus be assured... but there can be no doubt that some minimum of food, shelter, and clothing, sufficient to preserve health and the capacity to work, can be assured to everybody. Indeed, for a considerable part of the population of England this sort of security has long been achieved.
Nor is there any reason why the state should not assist... individuals in providing for those common hazards of life against which, because of their uncertainty, few individuals can make adequate provision. Where, as in the case of sickness and accident, neither the desire to avoid such calamities nor the efforts to overcome their consequences are as a rule weakened by the provision of assistance—where, in short, we deal with genuinely insurable risks—the case for the state's helping to organize a comprehensive system of social insurance is very strong. There are many points of detail where those wishing to preserve the competitive system and those wishing to supersede it by something different will disagree on the details of such schemes; and it is possible under the name of social insurance to introduce measures which tend to make competition more or less effective. But there is no incompatibility in principle between the state's providing greater security in this way and the preservation of individual freedom. Wherever communal action can mitigate disasters against which the individual can neither attempt to guard himself nor make the provision for the consequences, such communal action should undoubtedly be taken.

In 1973, Hayek reiterated in Law, Legislation and Liberty:

There is no reason why in a free society government should not assure to all, protection against severe deprivation in the form of an assured minimum income, or a floor below which nobody need to descend. To enter into such an insurance against extreme misfortune may well be in the interest of all; or it may be felt to be a clear moral duty of all to assist, within the organised community, those who cannot help themselves. So long as such a uniform minimum income is provided outside the market to all those who, for any reason, are unable to earn in the market an adequate maintenance, this need not lead to a restriction of freedom, or conflict with the Rule of law.

Political theorist Adam James Tebble has argued that Hayek's concession of a social minimum provided by the state introduces a conceptual tension with his epistemically derived commitment to private property rights, free markets, and spontaneous order. Hayek's views on social welfare policies have also been the subject of criticism. Critics contend that his opposition to government intervention in the economy fails to recognize the need for social safety nets and other forms of support for vulnerable populations. Furthermore, it has been argued that his views on welfare policy contradict his views on social justice.

Hayek also wrote that the state can play a role in the economy, specifically in creating a safety net, saying:

There is no reason why, in a society which has reached the general level of wealth ours has, the first kind of security should not be guaranteed to all without endangering general freedom; that is: some minimum of food, shelter and clothing, sufficient to preserve health. Nor is there any reason why the state should not help to organize a comprehensive system of social insurance in providing for those common hazards of life against which few can make adequate provision.

==== Criticism of "social justice" ====
Although Hayek believed in a society governed by laws, he disapproved of the notion of "social justice". He compared the market to a game in which "there is no point in calling the outcome just or unjust" and argued that "social justice is an empty phrase with no determinable content". Likewise, "the results of the individual's efforts are necessarily unpredictable, and the question as to whether the resulting distribution of incomes is just has no meaning". He generally regarded government redistribution of income or capital as an unacceptable intrusion upon individual freedom, saying that "the principle of distributive justice, once introduced, would not be fulfilled until the whole of society was organized in accordance with it. This would produce a kind of society which in all essential respects would be the opposite of a free society".

==== Liberalism and skepticism ====
Arthur M. Diamond argues Hayek's problems arise when he goes beyond claims that can be evaluated within economic science. Diamond argued:

The human mind, Hayek says, is not just limited in its ability to synthesize a vast array of concrete facts, it is also limited in its ability to give a deductively sound ground to ethics. Here is where the tension develops, for he also wants to give a reasoned moral defense of the free market. He is an intellectual skeptic who wants to give political philosophy a secure intellectual foundation. It is thus not too surprising that what results is confused and contradictory.

Chandran Kukathas argues that Hayek's defence of liberalism is unsuccessful because it rests on presuppositions that are incompatible. The unresolved dilemma of his political philosophy is how to mount a systematic defence of liberalism if one emphasizes the limited capacity of reason. Norman P. Barry similarly notes that the "critical rationalism" in Hayek's writings appears incompatible with "a certain kind of fatalism, that we must wait for evolution to pronounce its verdict". Milton Friedman and Anna Schwartz argue that the element of paradox exists in the views of Hayek. Noting Hayek's vigorous defense of "invisible hand" evolution that Hayek claimed created better economic institutions than could be created by rational design, Friedman pointed out the irony that Hayek was then proposing to replace the monetary system thus created with a deliberate construct of his own design. John N. Gray summarized this view as "his scheme for an ultra-liberal constitution was a prototypical version of the philosophy he had attacked". Bruce Caldwell wrote that "[i]f one is judging his work against the standard of whether he provided a finished political philosophy, Hayek clearly did not succeed", although he thinks that "economists may find Hayek's political writings useful".

==== Dictatorship and totalitarianism ====
Hayek sent António de Oliveira Salazar a copy of The Constitution of Liberty (1960) in 1962. Hayek hoped that his book—this "preliminary sketch of new constitutional principles"—"may assist" Salazar "in his endeavour to design a constitution which is proof against the abuses of democracy".

Hayek visited Chile in the 1970s and 1980s during the Government Junta of general Augusto Pinochet and accepted being appointed Honorary Chairman of the Centro de Estudios Públicos, the think tank formed by the economists who transformed Chile into a free market economy.

Asked about the military dictatorship of Chile by a Chilean interviewer, Hayek is translated from German to Spanish to English as having said the following:

As long term institutions, I am totally against dictatorships. But a dictatorship may be a necessary system for a transitional period. [...] Personally I prefer a liberal dictatorship to democratic government devoid of liberalism. My personal impression—and this is valid for South America—is that in Chile, for example, we will witness a transition from a dictatorial government to a liberal government.

In a letter to the London Times, he defended the Pinochet regime and said that he had "not been able to find a single person even in much maligned Chile who did not agree that personal freedom was much greater under Pinochet than it had been under Allende". Hayek admitted that "it is not very likely that this will succeed, even if, at a particular point in time, it may be the only hope there is", but he explained that "[i]t is not certain hope, because it will always depend on the goodwill of an individual, and there are very few individuals one can trust. But if it is the sole opportunity which exists at a particular moment it may be the best solution despite this. And only if and when the dictatorial government is visibly directing its steps towards limited democracy".

For Hayek, the distinction between authoritarianism and totalitarianism has much importance and he was at pains to emphasise his opposition to totalitarianism, noting that the concept of transitional dictatorship which he defended was characterised by authoritarianism, not totalitarianism. For example, when Hayek visited Venezuela in May 1981, he was asked to comment on the prevalence of totalitarian regimes in Latin America. In reply, Hayek warned against confusing "totalitarianism with authoritarianism" and said that he was unaware of "any totalitarian governments in Latin America. The only one was Chile under Allende". For Hayek, the word "totalitarian" signifies something very specific, namely the intention to "organize the whole of society" to attain a "definite social goal" which is stark in contrast to "liberalism and individualism". He claimed that democracy can also be repressive and totalitarian; in The Constitution of Liberty he often refers to Jacob Talmon's concept of totalitarian democracy.

==== Immigration, nationalism and race ====
Hayek was skeptical about international immigration and supported Thatcher's anti-immigration policies. In Law, Legislation and Liberty he elaborated:

Freedom of migration is one of the widely accepted and wholly admirable principles of liberalism. But should this generally give the stranger a right to settle down in a community in which he is not welcome? Has he a claim to be given a job or be sold a house if no resident is willing to do so? He clearly should be entitled to accept a job or buy a house if offered to him. But have the individual inhabitants a duty to offer either to him? Or ought it to be an offence if they voluntarily agree not to do so? Swiss and Tyrolese villages have a way of keeping out strangers which neither infringe nor rely on any law. Is this anti-liberal or morally justified? For established old communities I have no certain answers to these questions.

He was mainly preoccupied with practical problems concerning immigration:

There exist, of course, other reasons why such restrictions appear unavoidable so long as certain differences in national or ethnic traditions (especially differences in the rate of propagation) exist-which in turn are not likely to disappear so long as restrictions on migration continue. We must face the fact that we here encounter a limit to the universal application of those liberal principles of policy which the existing facts of the present world make unavoidable.

He was not sympathetic to nationalist ideas and was afraid that mass immigration might revive nationalist sentiment among domestic population and ruin the postwar progress that was made among Western nations. He additionally explained:

However far modern man accepts in principle the ideal that the same rules should apply to all men, in fact he does concede it only to those whom he regards as similar to himself, and only slowly learns to extend the range of those he does accept as his likes. There is little legislation can do to speed up this process and much it may do to reverse it by re-awakening sentiments that are already on the wane.

Hayek made several culturally insensitive remarks about ethnic groups which he stated was not based on a racial feeling. During World War II he discussed the possibility of sending his children to the United States but was concerned that they might be placed with a "coloured family". In a later interview, questioned about his attitude towards Black people, he said laconically that he "did not like dancing Negroes" and on another occasion he ridiculed the decision to award the Nobel Peace Prize to Martin Luther King Jr. He also made negative comments about awarding the Prize to Ralph Bunche, Albert Luthuli, and his LSE colleague W. Arthur Lewis whom he described as an "unusually able West Indian negro". In 1978 Hayek made a month-long visit to South Africa (his third) where he gave numerous lectures, interviews, and met prominent politicians and business leaders, unconcerned about possible propagandistic effect of his tour for Apartheid regime. He expressed his opposition to some of the government policies, believing that publicly funded institutions should treat all citizens equally, but also claimed that private institutions have the right to discriminate. Additionally, he condemned the "scandalous" hostility and interference of the international community in South African internal affairs. He further explained his attitude:

People in South Africa have to deal with their own problems, and the idea that you can use external pressure to change people, who after all have built up a civilization of a kind, seems to me morally a very doubtful belief.

While Hayek gave somewhat ambiguous comments on the injustices of Apartheid and proper role of the state, some of his Mont Pelerin colleagues, such as John Davenport and Wilhelm Röpke, were more ardent supporters of South African government and criticized Hayek for being too soft on the subject.

==== Inequality and class ====
In The Constitution of Liberty, Hayek wrote:

Yet is it really so obvious that the tennis or golf professional is a more useful member of society than the wealthy amateurs who devoted their time to perfecting these games? Or that the paid curator of a public museum is more useful than a private collector? Before the reader answers these questions too hastily, I would ask him to consider whether there would ever have been golf or tennis professionals or museum curators if wealthy amateurs had not preceded them. Can we not hope that other new interests will still arise from the playful explorations of those who can indulge in them for the short span of a human life? It is only natural that the development of the art of living and of the non-materialistic values should have profited most from the activities of those who had no material worries.

Hayek was against high taxes on inheritance, believing that it is natural function of the family to transmit standards, traditions and material goods. Without transmission of property, parents might try to secure the future of their children by placing them in prestigious and high-paying positions, as was customary in socialist countries, which creates even worse injustices. He was also strongly against progressive taxation, noting that in most countries additional taxes paid by the rich amount to insignificantly small amount of total tax revenue and that the only major result of the policy is "gratification of the envy of the less-well-off". He also claimed that it is contrary to the idea of equality under the law and against democratic principle for the majority to impose discriminatory rules against the minority.

== Influence and recognition ==
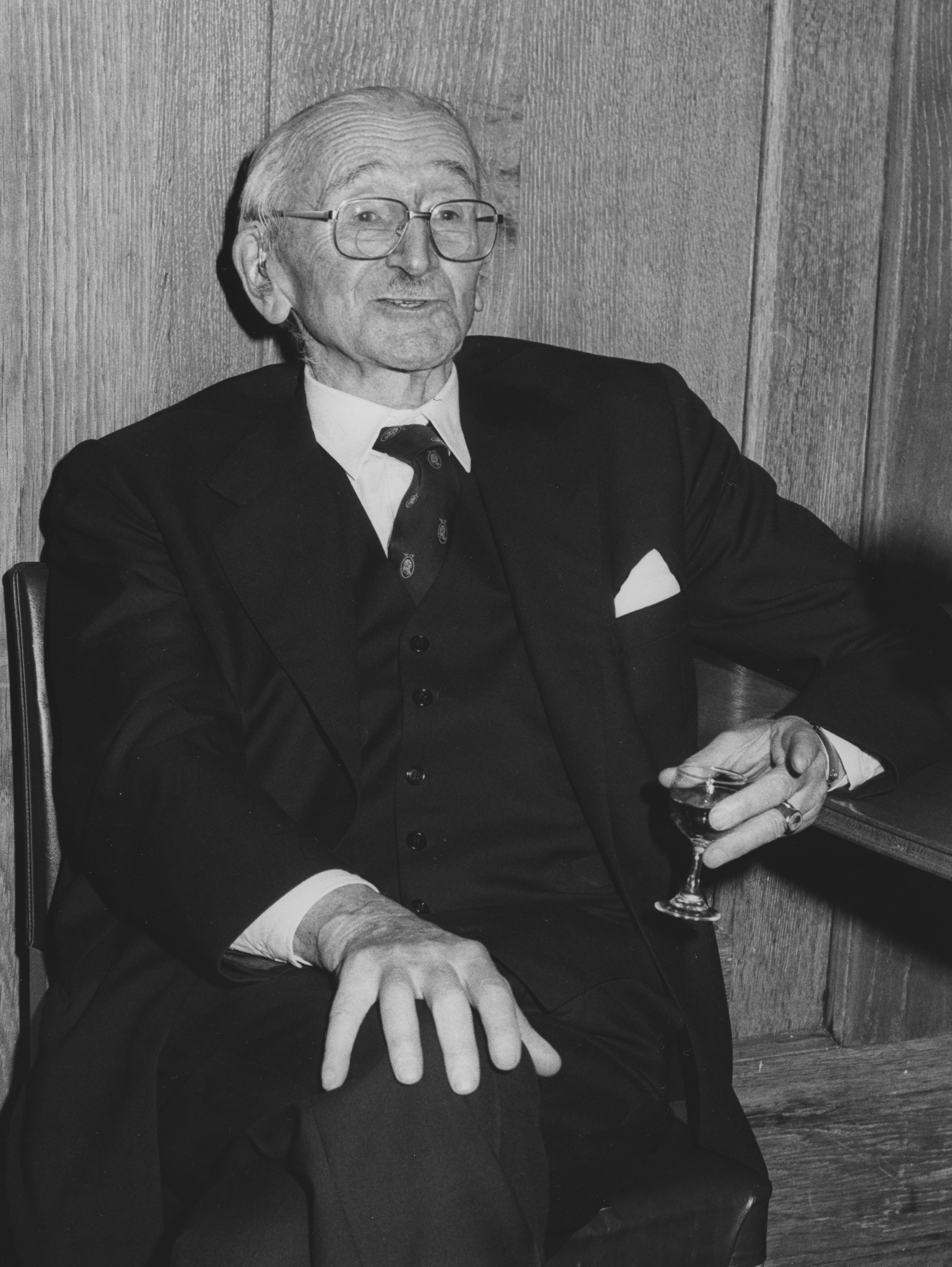
An elderly Hayek in 1981

Hayek's influence on the development of economics is widely acknowledged. With regard to the popularity of his Nobel acceptance lecture, Hayek is the second-most frequently cited economist (after Kenneth Arrow) in the Nobel lectures of the prize winners in economics. Hayek wrote critically there of the field of orthodox economics and neo-classical modelisation. A number of Nobel Laureates in economics, such as Vernon Smith and Herbert A. Simon, recognise Hayek as the greatest modern economist. (Note: Smith: Smith, Vernon (1999). "Reflections on Human Action after 50 years" (PDF). Cato Journal. 19 (2). "Hayek, in my view, is the leading economic thinker of the 20th century."; Simon, Herbert (1981). The Sciences of the Artificial (2nd ed.). Cambridge: The MIT Press. "No one has characterized market mechanisms better than Friedrich von Hayek") Economic historian Douglass North, also a Nobel Laureate, claimed in a lecture that "Hayek talked about most of the interesting problems of our time" and that he considered him "the most interesting economist of the 20th century". Another Nobel winner, Paul Samuelson, believed that Hayek was worthy of his award, but nevertheless claimed that "there were good historical reasons for fading memories of Hayek within the mainstream last half of the twentieth century economist fraternity. In 1931, Hayek's Prices and Production had enjoyed an ultra-short Byronic success. In retrospect hindsight tells us that its mumbo-jumbo about the period of production grossly misdiagnosed the macroeconomics of the 1927–1931 (and the 1931–2007) historical scene". Despite this comment, Samuelson spent the last 50 years of his life obsessed with the problems of capital theory identified by Hayek and Böhm-Bawerk, and Samuelson flatly judged Hayek to have been right and his own teacher Joseph Schumpeter to have been wrong on the central economic question of the 20th century, the feasibility of socialist economic planning in a production goods dominated economy.

Conservative philosopher Roger Scruton wrote that Hayek was "the most powerful intellect on the right".

In 1944, he was elected as a Fellow of the British Academy after he was nominated for membership by Keynes.

Harvard economist and former Harvard University President Lawrence Summers explains Hayek's place in modern economics: "What's the single most important thing to learn from an economics course today? What I tried to leave my students with is the view that the invisible hand is more powerful than the [un]hidden hand. Things will happen in well-organized efforts without direction, controls, plans. That's the consensus among economists. That's the Hayek legacy".

By 1947, Hayek was an organiser of the Mont Pelerin Society, a group of classical liberals who sought to oppose socialism. Hayek was also instrumental in the founding of the Institute of Economic Affairs, the right-wing libertarian and free-market think tank that inspired Thatcherism. He was in addition a member of the conservative and libertarian Philadelphia Society.

Hayek had a long-standing and close friendship with philosopher of science Karl Popper, who was also from Vienna. In a letter to Hayek in 1944, Popper stated: "I think I have learnt more from you than from any other living thinker, except perhaps Alfred Tarski". Popper dedicated his Conjectures and Refutations to Hayek. For his part, Hayek dedicated a collection of papers, Studies in Philosophy, Politics, and Economics, to Popper and in 1982 said that "ever since his Logik der Forschung first came out in 1934, I have been a complete adherent to his general theory of methodology". Popper also participated in the inaugural meeting of the Mont Pelerin Society. Their friendship and mutual admiration do not change the fact that there are important differences between their ideas.

Hayek also played a central role in Milton Friedman's intellectual development. Friedman wrote:

My interest in public policy and political philosophy was rather casual before I joined the faculty of the University of Chicago. Informal discussions with colleagues and friends stimulated a greater interest, which was reinforced by Friedrich Hayek's powerful book The Road to Serfdom, by my attendance at the first meeting of the Mont Pelerin Society in 1947, and by discussions with Hayek after he joined the university faculty in 1950. In addition, Hayek attracted an exceptionally able group of students who were dedicated to a libertarian ideology. They started a student publication, The New Individualist Review, which was the outstanding libertarian journal of opinion for some years. I served as an adviser to the journal and published a number of articles in it....

While Friedman often mentioned Hayek as an important influence, Hayek rarely mentioned Friedman. He deeply disagreed with Chicago School methodology, quantitative and macroeconomic focus, and claimed that Friedman's Essays in Positive Economics was as dangerous a book as Keynes' General Theory. Friedman also claimed that despite some Popperian influence, Hayek always retained basic Misesian praxeological views, which he found "utterly nonsensical". He also noted that he admired Hayek only for his political works and disagreed with his technical economics; he called Prices and Production a "very flawed book" and The Pure Theory of Capital "unreadable". There were occasional tensions at the Mont Pelerin meetings between Hayek's and Friedman's followers that sometimes threatened to split the Society. Although they worked at the same university and shared political beliefs, Hayek and Friedman rarely collaborated professionally and were not close friends.

Some radical libertarians had a negative view of Hayek and his milder form of liberalism. Ayn Rand disliked him, seeing him as a conservative and compromiser. In a letter to Rose Wilder Lane in 1946 she wrote:

Now to your question: 'Do those almost with us do more harm than 100% enemies?' I don't think this can be answered with a flat 'yes' or 'no,' because the 'almost' is such a wide term. There is one general rule to observe: those who are with us, but merely do not go far enough are the ones who may do us some good. Those who agree with us in some respects, yet preach contradictory ideas at the same time, are definitely more harmful than 100% enemies. As an example of the kind of 'almost' I would tolerate, I'd name Ludwig von Mises. As an example of our most pernicious enemy, I would name Hayek. That one is real poison.

Hayek made no known written references to Rand.

Wikipedia co-founder Jimmy Wales was influenced by Hayek's ideas on spontaneous order and the Austrian School of economics, after being exposed to these ideas by Austrian economist and Mises Institute Senior Fellow Mark Thornton.

In the 21st century, some libertarian political scientists argue that Hayek would be in favor of Bitcoin and cryptocurrencies due to its resistance to political pressure and due to Hayek's emphasis of sound money and competition in currencies. They also argue that cryptocurrency and Bitcoin serve as a "Hayekian escape", a method that people can use to escape the government's currency monopoly.

=== Relation to conservatism ===
Hayek received new attention in the 1980s and 1990s with the rise of conservative governments in the United States, United Kingdom and Canada. After winning the 1979 United Kingdom general election, Margaret Thatcher appointed Keith Joseph, the director of the Hayekian Centre for Policy Studies, as her secretary of state for industry in an effort to redirect parliament's economic strategies. Likewise, David Stockman, Ronald Reagan's most influential financial official in 1981, was an acknowledged follower of Hayek.

Although usually identified as a conservative liberal or a liberal conservative, Hayek published an essay, "Why I Am Not a Conservative" (included as an appendix to The Constitution of Liberty), in which he criticized certain aspects of conservatism from a liberal perspective. Edmund Fawcett summarizes Hayek's critique as follows:

Conservatives, on Hayek's account, suffered from the following weaknesses. They feared change unduly. They were unreasonably frightened of uncontrolled social forces. They were too fond of authority. They had no grasp of economics. They lacked the feel for "abstraction" needed for engaging with people of different outlooks. They were too cozy with elites and establishments. They gave in to jingoism and chauvinism. They tended to think mystically, much as socialists tended to overrationalize. They were, last, too suspicious of democracy.

Hayek identified himself as a classical liberal but noted that in the United States it had become almost impossible to use "liberal" in its original definition and the term "libertarian" was used instead. He also found libertarianism as a term "singularly unattractive" and offered the term "Old Whig" (a phrase borrowed from Edmund Burke) instead. In his later life, he said: "I am becoming a Burkean Whig". Whiggery as a political doctrine had little affinity for classical political economy, the tabernacle of the Manchester School and William Gladstone.

In his 1956 preface to The Road to Serfdom, Hayek summarized all his disagreements with conservatism in this way:

Conservatism, though a necessary element in any stable society, is not a social program; in its paternalistic, nationalistic, and poweradoring tendencies it is often closer to socialism than true liberalism; and with its traditionalistic, anti-intellectual, and often mystical propensities it will never, except in short periods of disillusionment, appeal to the young and all those others who believe that some changes are desirable if this world is to become a better place. A conservative movement, by its very nature, is bound to be a defender of established privilege and to lean on the power of government for the protection of privilege. The essence of the liberal position, however, is the denial of all privilege, if privilege is understood in its proper and original meaning of the state granting and protecting rights to some which are not available on equal terms to others.

Samuel Brittan, concluded in 2010 that "Hayek's book [The Constitution of Liberty] is still probably the most comprehensive statement of the underlying ideas of the moderate free market philosophy espoused by neoliberals". Brittan adds that although Raymond Plant (2009) comes out in the end against Hayek's doctrines, Plant gives The Constitution of Liberty a "more thorough and fair-minded analysis than it has received even from its professed adherents". As a neo-liberal, he helped found the Mont Pelerin Society, a prominent neo-liberal think tank where many other minds, such as Mises and Friedman gathered.

Although Hayek is likely a student of the neo-liberal school of libertarianism, he is nonetheless influential in the conservative movement, mainly for his critique of collectivism.

=== Policy discussions ===
Hayek's ideas on spontaneous order and the importance of prices in dealing with the knowledge problem inspired a debate on economic development and transition economies after the fall of the Berlin wall. For instance, economist Peter Boettke elaborated in detail on why reforming socialism failed and the Soviet Union broke down. Economist Ronald McKinnon uses Hayekian ideas to describe the challenges of transition from a centralized state and planned economy to a market economy. Former World Bank Chief Economist William Easterly emphasizes why foreign aid tends to have no effect at best in books such as The White Man's Burden: Why the West's Efforts to Aid the Rest Have Done So Much Ill and So Little Good.

Since the 2008 financial crisis, there is a renewed interest in Hayek's core explanation of boom-and-bust cycles, which serves as an alternative explanation to that of the savings glut as launched by economist and former Federal Reserve Chair Ben Bernanke. Economists at the Bank for International Settlements, e.g. William R. White, emphasize the importance of Hayekian insights and the impact of monetary policies and credit growth as root causes of financial cycles. Andreas Hoffmann and Gunther Schnabl provide an international perspective and explain recurring financial cycles in the world economy as consequence of gradual interest rate cuts led by the central banks in the large advanced economies since the 1980s. Nicolas Cachanosky outlines the impact of American monetary policy on the production structure in Latin America.

In line with Hayek, an increasing number of contemporary researchers sees expansionary monetary policies and too low interest rates as mal-incentives and main drivers of financial crises in general and the subprime market crisis in particular. To prevent problems caused by monetary policy, Hayekian and Austrian economists discuss alternatives to current policies and organizations. For instance, Lawrence H. White argued in favor of free banking in the spirit of Hayek's "Denationalisation of Money". Along with market monetarist economist Scott Sumner, White also noted that the monetary policy norm that Hayek prescribed, first in Prices and Production (1931) and as late as the 1970s, was the stabilization of nominal income.

Hayek's ideas find their way into the discussion of the post-Great Recession issues of secular stagnation. Monetary policy and mounting regulation are argued to have undermined the innovative forces of the market economies. Quantitative easing following the financial crises is argued to have not only conserved structural distortions in the economy, leading to a fall in trend-growth. It also created new distortions and contributes to distributional conflicts.

=== Central European politics ===
In the 1970s and 1980s, the writings of Hayek were a major influence on some of the future postsocialist economic and political elites in Central and Eastern Europe. Supporting examples include the following:

There is no figure who had more of an influence, no person had more of an influence on the intellectuals behind the Iron Curtain than Friedrich Hayek. His books were translated and published by the underground and black market editions, read widely, and undoubtedly influenced the climate of opinion that ultimately brought about the collapse of the Soviet Union.

— Milton Friedman (Hoover Institution)

The most interesting among the courageous dissenters of the 1980s were the classical liberals, disciples of F.A. Hayek, from whom they had learned about the crucial importance of economic freedom and about the often-ignored conceptual difference between liberalism and democracy.

— Andrzej Walicki (History, Notre Dame)

Estonian Prime Minister Mart Laar came to my office the other day to recount his country's remarkable transformation. He described a nation of people who are harder-working, more virtuous—yes, more virtuous, because the market punishes immorality—and more hopeful about the future than they've ever been in their history. I asked Mr. Laar where his government got the idea for these reforms. Do you know what he replied? He said, "We read Milton Friedman and F.A. Hayek."

— United States Representative Dick Armey

I was 25 years old and pursuing my doctorate in economics when I was allowed to spend six months of post-graduate studies in Naples, Italy. I read the Western economic textbooks and also the more general work of people like Hayek. By the time I returned to Czechoslovakia, I had an understanding of the principles of the market. In 1968, I was glad at the political liberalism of the Dubcek Prague Spring, but was very critical of the Third Way they pursued in economics.

— Václav Klaus (former President of the Czech Republic)

== Legacy and honours ==
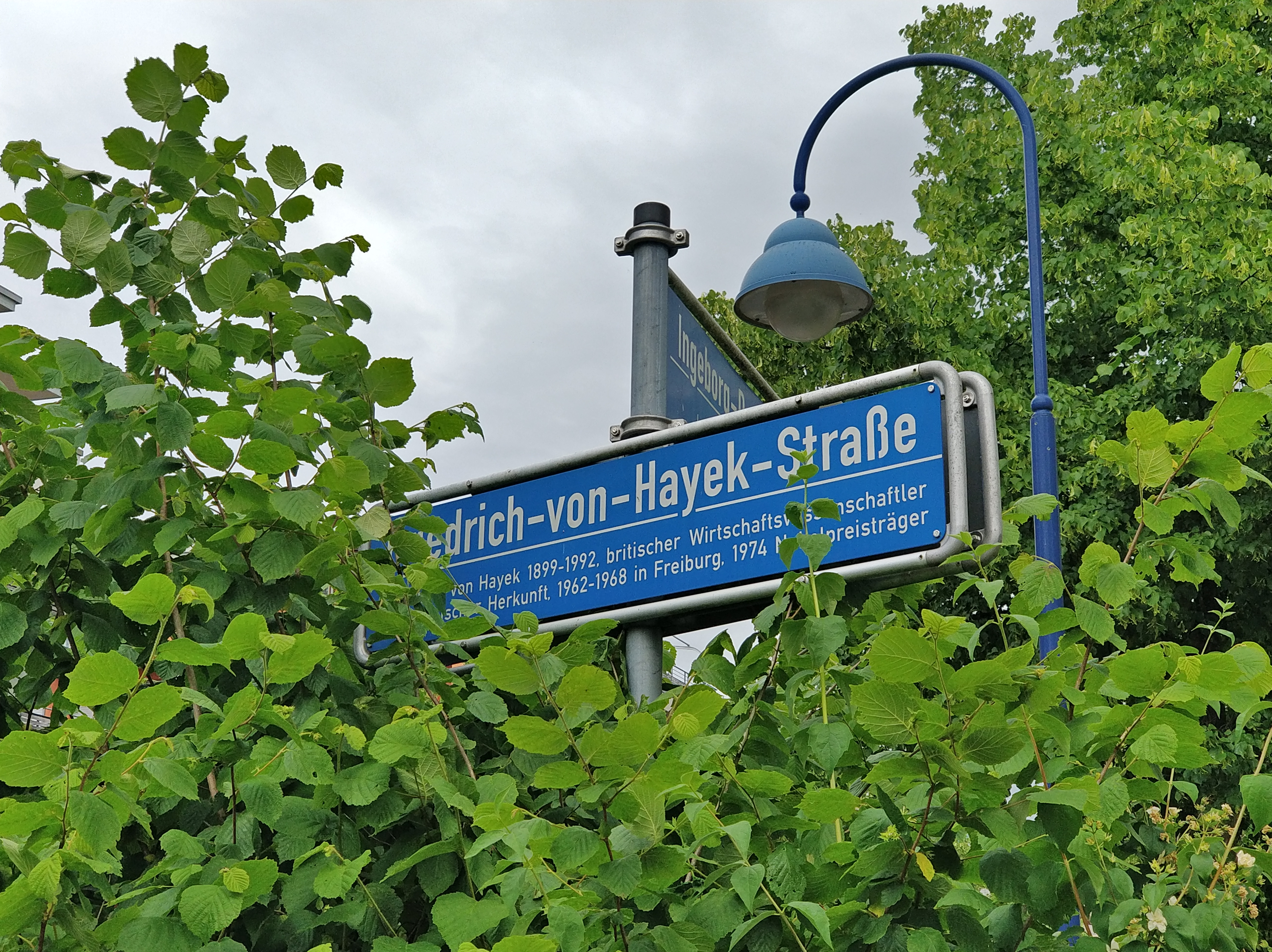
A street sign named for Hayek in Freiburg im Breisgau, Germany

Hayek's intellectual presence has remained evident in the years following his death, especially in the universities where he had taught, namely the London School of Economics, the University of Chicago and the University of Freiburg. His influence and contributions have been noted by many. A number of tributes have resulted, many established posthumously:

- The Hayek Society, a student-run group at the London School of Economics, was established in his honour.
- The Oxford Hayek Society, founded in 1983, is named after Hayek.
- The Cato Institute named its lower level auditorium after Hayek, who had been a Distinguished Senior Fellow at Cato during his later years.
- The auditorium of the school of economics in Universidad Francisco Marroquín in Guatemala is named after him.
- The Hayek Fund for Scholars of the Institute for Humane Studies provides financial awards for academic career activities of graduate students and untenured faculty members.
- The Ludwig von Mises Institute holds a lecture named after Hayek every year at its Austrian Scholars Conference and invites notable academics to speak about subjects relating to Hayek's contributions to the Austrian School.
- George Mason University has an economics essay award named in honour of Hayek.
- The Mercatus Center, a free-market think tank also at George Mason University, who has a philosophy, politics and economics program of study named for Hayek.
- The Mont Pelerin Society has a quadrennial economics essay contest named in his honour.
- Hayek was awarded honorary degrees from Rikkyo University, University of Vienna and University of Salzburg.
- Hayek has an investment portfolio named after him. The Hayek Fund invests in corporations who financially support free market public policy organisations
- 1974: Austrian Decoration for Science and Art
- 1974: Nobel Memorial Prize in Economic Sciences (Sweden)
- 1977: Pour le Mérite for Science and Art (Germany)
- 1983: Honorary Ring of Vienna
- 1984: Honorary Dean of WHU – Otto Beisheim School of Management
- 1984: Hanns Martin Schleyer Prize
- 1984: Member of the Order of the Companions of Honour (United Kingdom)
- 1990: Grand Gold Medal with Star for Services to the Republic of Austria
- 1991: Presidential Medal of Freedom (United States)
- 1994: The FA Hayek Scholarship in Economics or Political Science, University of Canterbury. The scholarship supports students toward study for an honours or master's degree in the Economics or Political Science at the university. It was established in 1994 by a gift from entrepreneur Alan Gibbs.

In 2011, his article "The Use of Knowledge in Society" was selected as one of the top 20 articles published in The American Economic Review during its first 100 years.

The New York University Journal of Law and Liberty holds an annual lecture in his honor.

== Notable works ==
- The Road to Serfdom, 1944.
- Individualism and Economic Order, 1948.
- The Constitution of Liberty, 1960. The Definitive Edition, 2011. Description and preview.
- Law, Legislation and Liberty (3 volumes)
  - Volume I. Rules and Order, 1973.
  - Volume II. The Mirage of Social Justice, 1976.
  - Volume III. The Political Order of a Free People, 1979.
- The Fatal Conceit: The Errors of Socialism, 1988. The authorship of The Fatal Conceit is under scholarly dispute. The book in its published form may actually have been written entirely by its editor W. W. Bartley III and not by Hayek.

== See also ==
- Neoliberalism
- Constructivist epistemology
- Hayek Lecture
- Fear the Boom and Bust, a series of music videos produced by the Mercatus Center in which Keynes and Hayek take part in a rap battle
- Global financial system, which describes the financial system consisting of institutions and regulators that act on the international level
- History of economic thought
- Liberalism in Austria
