= August von Hayek =

Austrian physician and botanist (1871–1928)

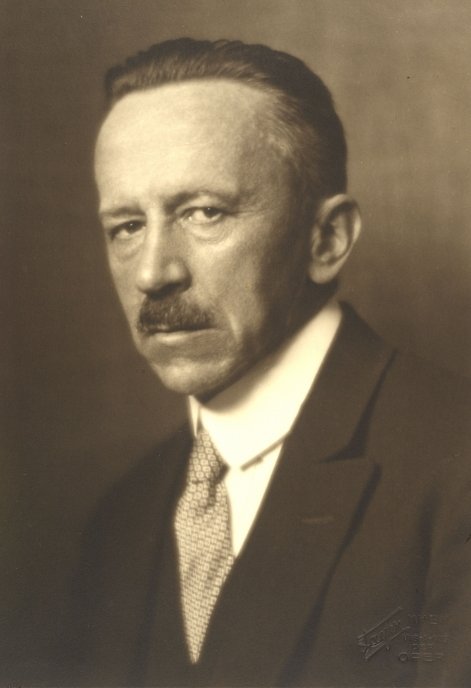
- Hayek in 1927
- Born: 14 December 1871; Vienna, Austria-Hungary
- Died: 11 June 1928 (aged 56); Vienna, Austria
- Education: University of Vienna (MD, PhD)
- Occupations: Physician; botanist; educator
- Spouse: Felicitas von Juraschek (m. 1898)
- Children: Friedrich; Heinrich; Erich
- Father: Gustav von Hayek

August von Hayek (14 December 1871 – 11 June 1928) was an Austrian physician and botanist born in Vienna.

== Early life and education ==
August von Hayek was born on 14 December 1871 in Vienna, to naturalist Gustav von Hayek and Sidonie Marie Anna Mayerhofer.

In 1895 he obtained his medical doctorate from the University of Vienna. Soon, he was employed by the municipal ministry of health. He obtained his PhD in 1905.

== Career ==
Beginning in 1922, he taught classes at the Hochschule für Bodenkultur in Vienna, and from 1926, he was an associate professor at the university. He died in 1928 in Vienna.

He is remembered for phytogeographical investigations that took place within the Austria-Hungarian Empire, in particular, Styria and the Balkans. He also conducted detailed studies on the historical development of flora found along the eastern and southeastern edge of the Alps. In the field of plant systematics, he specialized in Centaurea species native to Austria-Hungary.

== Personal life and death ==
He was married to Felicitas von Juraschek. Their children were Friedrich, Heinrich, and Erich.

He died on 11 June 1928 in Vienna.

== Principal works ==
- Prodromus Florae Peninsulae Balkanicae 1. Band. Pteridophyta, Gymnospermae, Dicotyledoneae (Apetalae et Choripetalae) (PDF). Dahlem bei Berlin: Verlag des Repertoriums. 1924–1927. (Prodomus of Balkan Peninsula flora).
- Friedrich Markgraf, ed. (1928–1931). Prodromus Florae Peninsulae Balcanicae. 2. Band. Dicotyledoneae Sympetalae (PDF). Dahlem bei Berlin: Verlag des Repertoriums.
- Friedrich Markgraf, ed. (1932–1933). Prodromus Florae Peninsulae Balcanicae. 3. Band. Monocotyledoneae (PDF). Dahlem bei Berlin: Verlag des Repertoriums.
- Flora von der Steiermark: eine systematische Bearbeitung der im Herzogtum Steiermark wildwachsenden oder im Grossen gebauten Farn- und Blütenpflanzen nebst einer pflanzengeographischen Schilderung des Landes. Berlin: Borntraeger. 1908 – via Internet Archive.
- Schedae ad Florum stiriacum exsiccatum, 1904–1912.
- Die Pflanzendecke Österreich-Ungarns. Vol. 1. Leipzig und Wien: Franz Deuticke. 1916 – via Internet Archive.
- Allgemeine Pflanzengeographie. Berlin: Gebrüder Borntraeger. 1926.

Hayek edited two exsiccata series, namely Flora stiriaca exsiccata and Centaureae exsiccatae criticae.
