= The Road to Serfdom =

Book by Friedrich von Hayek

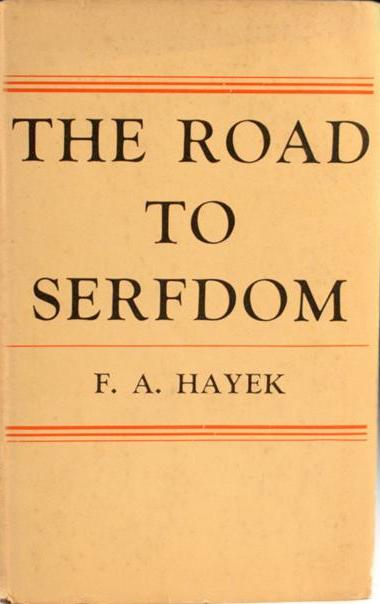
- Cover of the first UK edition
- Author: Friedrich Hayek
- Language: English
- Subject: Political science, economics
- Published: 1944 (Routledge Press, England); 1944 (University of Chicago Press, US)
- Publication place: England
- Media type: Print
- Pages: 266
- ISBN: 0-226-32061-8
- OCLC: 30733740
- Dewey Decimal: 338.9 20
- LC Class: HD82 .H38 1994

The Road to Serfdom is a book by the Austrian-British economist and philosopher Friedrich Hayek. In the book, Hayek "[warns] of the danger of tyranny that inevitably results from government control of economic decision-making through central planning." He further argues that the abandonment of individualism and classical liberalism inevitably leads to a loss of freedom, the creation of an oppressive society, the tyranny of a dictator, and the serfdom of the individual. Hayek challenged the view, popular among British Marxists, that fascism (including Nazism) was a capitalist reaction against socialism. He argued that fascism, Nazism, and state-socialism had common roots in central economic planning and empowering the state over the individual.

Since its publication in 1944, The Road to Serfdom has been popular among liberal (especially classical liberal) and conservative thinkers. It has been translated into more than 20 languages and sold over two million copies (as of 2010). The book was first published in Britain by Routledge in March 1944, during World War II, and was quite popular, leading Hayek to call it "that unobtainable book", also due in part to wartime paper rationing. It was published in the United States by the University of Chicago Press in September 1944 and achieved great popularity. At the arrangement of editor Max Eastman, the American magazine Reader's Digest published an abridged version in April 1945, enabling The Road to Serfdom to reach a wider non-academic audience.

The Road to Serfdom was to be the popular edition of the second volume of Hayek's treatise entitled "The Abuse and Decline of Reason", and the title was inspired by the writings of the 19th century French classical liberal thinker Alexis de Tocqueville on the "road to servitude". Initially written as a response to the report written by William Beveridge, the Liberal politician and dean of the London School of Economics where Hayek worked at the time, the book made a significant impact on 20th-century political discourse, especially American conservative and libertarian economic and political debate.

== Publication ==
While a professor at the London School of Economics in the early 1930s – in the era of the Great Depression, the rise of autocracies in Russia, Italy and Germany, and World War II – Hayek wrote a memo to William Beveridge, then the director there, to dispute the then-popular claim that fascism represented the dying gasp of a failed capitalist system. The memo grew into a magazine article, and he intended to incorporate elements of the article into a book much larger than The Road to Serfdom. However, he ultimately decided to write The Road to Serfdom as its own book.

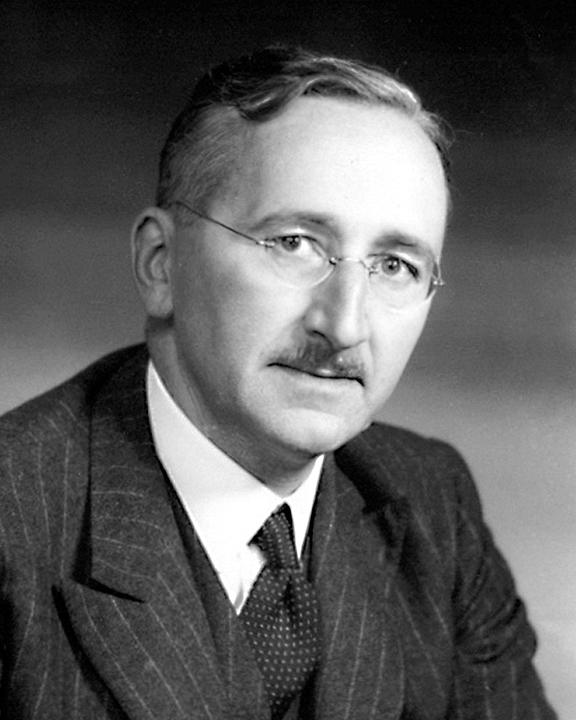
Friedrich Hayek

The book was originally published for a British audience by Routledge Press in March 1944 in the United Kingdom. The book was subsequently rejected by three publishers in the United States, and it was only after economist Aaron Director spoke to friends at the University of Chicago that the book was published in the U.S. by the University of Chicago Press on September 18, 1944. The American publisher's expectation was that the book would sell between 900 and 3,000 copies. However, the initial printing run of 2,000 copies was quickly sold out, and 30,000 copies were sold within six months. In 2007, the University of Chicago Press estimated that more than 350,000 copies had been sold.

A 20-page version of the book was then published in the April 1945 issue of Reader's Digest, with a press run of several million copies. A 95-page abridged version was also published in 1945 and 1946. In February 1945, a picture-book version was published in Look magazine, later made into a pamphlet and distributed by General Motors. The book has been translated into approximately 20 languages and is dedicated "To the socialists of all parties". The introduction to the 50th anniversary edition is written by Milton Friedman (another recipient of the Nobel Prize in Economics 1976).

In 2007, the University of Chicago Press issued a "Definitive Edition", Volume 2 in the Collected Works of F. A. Hayek series. In June 2010, the book achieved new popularity by rising to the top of the Amazon.com bestseller list following extended coverage of the book on The Glenn Beck Program. Since that date, it has sold another 250,000 copies in its print and digital editions.

== Summary ==
Hayek argues that Western democracies, including the United Kingdom and the United States, have "progressively abandoned that freedom in economic affairs without which personal and political freedom has never existed in the past". Society has mistakenly tried to ensure continuing prosperity by centralized planning, which inevitably leads to totalitarianism. "We have in effect undertaken to dispense with the forces which produced unforeseen results and to replace the impersonal and anonymous mechanism of the market by collective and 'conscious' direction of all social forces to deliberately chosen goals." Socialism, while presented as a means of assuring equality, does so through "restraint and servitude", while "democracy seeks equality in liberty". Planning, because it is coercive, is an inferior method of regulation, while the competition of a free market is superior "because it is the only method by which our activities can be adjusted to each other without the coercive or arbitrary intervention of authority".

Centralized planning is inherently undemocratic in Hayek's view, because it requires "that the will of a small minority be imposed upon the people". The power of these minorities to act by taking money or property in pursuit of centralized goals, destroys the Rule of law and individual freedoms. Where there is centralized planning, "the individual would more than ever become a mere means, to be used by the authority in the service of such abstractions as the 'social welfare' or the 'good of the community'". Even the very poor have more personal freedom in an open society than a centrally planned one. "While the last resort of a competitive economy is the bailiff, the ultimate sanction of a planned economy is the hangman." Socialism is a hypocritical system because its professed humanitarian goals can only be put into practice by brutal methods "of which most socialists disapprove". Such centralized systems also require effective propaganda, so that the people come to believe that the state's goals are theirs.

Hayek argues that the roots of National Socialism lie in socialism, and then draws parallels to the thought of British leaders:

The increasing veneration for the state, the admiration of power, and of bigness for bigness' sake, the enthusiasm for "organization" of everything (we now call it "planning") and that "inability to leave anything to the simple power of organic growth" ... are all scarcely less marked in England now than they were in Germany.

Hayek believed that after World War II, "wisdom in the management of our economic affairs will be even more important than before and that the fate of our civilization will ultimately depend on how we solve the economic problems we shall then face". The only chance to build a decent world is "to improve the general level of wealth" via the activities of free markets. He saw international organization as involving a further threat to individual freedom. He concluded: "The guiding principle that a policy of freedom for the individual is the only truly progressive policy remains as true today as it was in the nineteenth century."

=== Role of government ===
Although Hayek believed that government intervention in markets would lead to a loss of freedom, he recognized a limited role for government to perform tasks for which he believed free markets were not capable:

The successful use of competition as the principle of social organization precludes certain types of coercive interference with economic life, but it admits of others which sometimes may very considerably assist its work and even requires certain kinds of government action.

While Hayek is opposed to regulations that restrict the freedom to enter a trade, or to buy and sell at any price, or to control quantities, he acknowledges the utility of regulations that restrict legal methods of production, so long as these are applied equally to everyone and not used as an indirect way of controlling prices or quantities, and without forgetting the cost of such restrictions:

To prohibit the use of certain poisonous substances, or to require special precautions in their use, to limit working hours or to require certain sanitary arrangements, is fully compatible with the preservation of competition. The only question here is whether in the particular instance, the advantages gained are greater than the social costs they impose.

He notes that there are certain areas, such as the environment, where activities that cause damage to third parties (known to economists as "negative externalities") cannot effectively be regulated solely by the marketplace:

Nor can certain harmful effects of deforestation, of some methods of farming, or of the smoke and noise of factories, be confined to the owner of the property in question, or to those willing to submit to the damage for an agreed compensation.

The government also has a role in preventing fraud:

Even the most essential prerequisite of its [the market's] proper functioning, the prevention of fraud and deception (including exploitation of ignorance), provides a great and by no means fully accomplished object of legislative activity.

The government also has a role in creating a safety net:

There is no reason why, in a society which has reached the general level of wealth ours has, the first kind of security should not be guaranteed to all without endangering general freedom; that is: some minimum of food, shelter, and clothing, sufficient to preserve health. Nor is there any reason why the state should not help to organize a comprehensive system of social insurance in providing for those common hazards of life against which few can make adequate provision.

He concludes: "In no system that could be rationally defended would the state just do nothing."

=== Clarifications ===
After publication, Hayek offered a number of clarifications on words that were frequently misinterpreted:

- "Socialism", as Hayek used it, refers to state socialism and is used to mean state control of the economy, not a welfare state
- "Classical liberal ideals", means liberty, freedom and individual rights, as Hayek understood them

== Reception ==
=== Impact ===
In 2007, the University of Chicago Press estimated that more than 350,000 copies of The Road to Serfdom have been sold. It appears on Martin Seymour-Smith's list of the 100 Most Influential Books Ever Written, and it made number 1 on Human Events: Top Ten Books Every Republican Congressman Should Read in 2006. It was influential enough to warrant mention during the 1945 British general election, when according to Harold Macmillan, Winston Churchill was "fortified in his apprehensions [of a Labour government] by reading Professor Hayek's The Road to Serfdom" when he warned in an election broadcast in 1945 that a socialist system would "have to fall back on some form of Gestapo". The Labour leader Clement Attlee responded in his election broadcast by claiming that what Churchill had said was the "second-hand version of the academic views of an Austrian professor, Friedrich August von Hayek". The Conservative Central Office sacrificed 1.5 tons of their precious paper ration allocated for the 1945 election so that more copies of The Road to Serfdom could be printed, although to no avail, as Labour won a landslide victory.

Political historian Alan Brinkley had this to say about the impact of The Road to Serfdom:

The publication of two books ... helped to galvanize the concerns that were beginning to emerge among intellectuals (and many others) about the implications of totalitarianism. One was James Burnham's The Managerial Revolution ... [A second] Friedrich A. Hayek's The Road to Serfdom ... was far more controversial—and influential. Even more than Burnham, Hayek forced into public discourse the question of the compatibility of democracy and statism ... In responding to Burnham and Hayek ... liberals [in the statist sense of this term as used by some in the United States] were in fact responding to a powerful strain of Jeffersonian anti-statism in American political culture ... The result was a subtle but important shift in liberal [i.e. American statist] thinking.

=== Reviews ===
The Road to Serfdom has been the subject of much praise and much criticism. It was placed fourth on the list of the 100 best non-fiction books of the 20th century compiled by National Review magazine, was ranked number 16 in reader selections of the hundred best non-fiction book of the twentieth century administered by Modern Library, and appears on a recommended reading list for the libertarian right hosted on the Political Compass test website.

John Maynard Keynes said of it: "In my opinion it is a grand book ... Morally and philosophically I find myself in agreement with virtually the whole of it: and not only in agreement with it, but in deeply moved agreement." However, Keynes did not think Hayek's philosophy was of practical use; this was explained later in the same letter, commenting: "What we need therefore, in my opinion, is not a change in our economic programmes, which would only lead in practice to disillusion with the results of your philosophy; but perhaps even the contrary, namely, an enlargement of them. Your greatest danger ahead is the probable practical failure of the application of your philosophy in the United States."

George Orwell responded with both praise and criticism, stating, "in the negative part of Professor Hayek's thesis there is a great deal of truth. It cannot be said too often – at any rate, it is not being said nearly often enough – that collectivism is not inherently democratic, but, on the contrary, gives to a tyrannical minority such powers as the Spanish Inquisitors never dreamt of." Yet he also warned, "[A] return to 'free' competition means for the great mass of people a tyranny probably worse, because more irresponsible, than that of the state."

Milton Friedman described The Road to Serfdom as "one of the great books of our time", and said of it:

I think the Adam Smith role was played in this cycle [i.e. the late twentieth century collapse of socialism in which the idea of free-markets succeeded first, and then special events catalyzed a complete change of socio-political policy in countries around the world] by Friedrich Hayek's The Road to Serfdom.

Herman Finer, a Fabian socialist, published a rebuttal in his The Road to Reaction in 1946. Hayek called Finer's book "a specimen of abuse and invective which is probably unique in contemporary academic discussion".

In his review (collected in The Present as History, 1953) Marxist Paul Sweezy joked that Hayek would have you believe that if there was an over-production of baby carriages, the central planners would then order the population to have more babies instead of simply warehousing the temporary excess of carriages and decreasing production for next year. The cybernetic arguments of Stafford Beer in his 1973 CBC Massey Lectures, Designing Freedom – that intelligent adaptive planning can increase freedom – are of interest in this regard, as is the technical work of Herbert A. Simon and Albert Ando on the dynamics of hierarchical nearly decomposable systems in economics; namely, that everything in such a system is not tightly coupled to everything else.

Mises Institute economist Walter Block has observed critically that while The Road to Serfdom makes a strong case against centrally planned economies, it appears only lukewarm in its support of a free market system and laissez-faire capitalism, with Hayek even going so far as to say that "probably nothing has done so much harm to the liberal cause as the wooden insistence of some liberals on certain rules of thumb, above all the principle of laissez-faire capitalism". In the book, Hayek writes that the government has a role to play in the economy through the monetary system (a view that he later withdrew), work-hours regulation, social welfare, and institutions for the flow of proper information. Through analysis of this and many other of Hayek's works, Block asserts that: "in making the case against socialism, Hayek was led into making all sort of compromises with what otherwise appeared to be his own philosophical perspective – so much so, that if a system was erected on the basis of them, it would not differ too sharply from what this author explicitly opposed".

Critics such as Jeffrey Sachs, Gordon Tullock, Karl Polanyi, Barbara Wootton, Eric Zencey, and others believe that Hayek's contention that welfare states and economic planning inevitably lead to tyranny is not supported by empirical evidence or history. They point to examples such as Nordic countries, such as Sweden, to demonstrate that economic planning and civil liberties can co-exist. Other commentators argue that these critiques do not refute Hayek's core warning about the dangers of centralized planning and the nationalization of industry.

== See also ==
=== General concepts ===
- Criticism of anarchism
- Criticism of communism
- Criticism of socialism
- Economic calculation problem, the difficulties of central planning
- Institute of Economic Affairs
- New class, a theory of new social groups in post-industrial societies
- Nomenklatura, a class of Soviet communist appointees

=== Books ===
- Individualism and Economic Order
- Law, Legislation and Liberty
- Omnipotent Government
- The Constitution of Liberty
- The Fatal Conceit
