= Gustav von Hayek =

Austrian naturalist (1836–1911)

- Born: 21 March 1836; Brno, Austria-Hungary
- Died: 11 January 1911 (aged 74); Vienna, Austria-Hungary
- Education: Vienna University
- Occupations: Naturalist, educator
- Spouse: Sidonie Marie Anna Mayerhofer
- Children: August von Hayek
- Relatives: Friedrich von Hayek (grandson)

Gustav von Hayek (21 March 1836 – 11 January 1911) was an Austrian naturalist. He was the father of botanist August von Hayek (1871–1928) and the grandfather of economist Friedrich von Hayek (1899–1992).

== Biography ==
Hayek studied natural sciences at the University of Vienna, and served as an assistant to naturalist Andreas Kornhuber (1824–1905). Following graduation in 1869, he worked as a Gymnasialprofessor of natural sciences and chemistry in Vienna (1869 to 1901). He was secretary of the Comité international permanent ornithologique.

He was the author of a popular textbook for secondary school students, titled "Illustrierter Leitfaden der Naturgeschichte des Thierreiches" (Illustrated guide to the natural history of the animal kingdom, 1876). He was also author of the four volume "Handbuch der Zoologie", published from 1877 to 1893:

- Volume I: Protozoa, Coelenterata, Echinodermata und Vermes. Wien: C. Gerold's Sohn. 1877 – via Internet Archive.
- Volume II: Arthropoda, 1881
- Volume III: Mollusca, Vertebrata Anallantoidica. Wien: C. Gerold's Sohn. 1885 – via Internet Archive.
- Volume IV: Vertebrata Allantoidica: Reptilia, Aves, Mammalia. Wien: C. Gerold's Sohn. 1893 – via Internet Archive.
