= Lowestoft Chronicle =

American literary magazine

- Editor: Nicholas Litchfield
- Categories: Literary magazine
- Frequency: Quarterly
- Publisher: Lowestoft Chronicle Press
- Founded: 2009
- First issue: September 2009
- Country: United States
- Based in: Boston, Massachusetts
- Language: English
- Website: lowestoftchronicle.com
- ISSN: 2160-4274
- OCLC: 707083134

The Lowestoft Chronicle is a quarterly online magazine, based in Boston, Massachusetts, United States. It publishes short stories, flash fiction, poetry, creative nonfiction, interviews, and artwork. An anthology of the best work is published annually. Preference is given to humorous submissions with an emphasis on travel.

== History and reception ==
The magazine was established in September 2009 by Nicholas Litchfield, an English-born author and journalist who lives in Western New York. The name was inspired by the English coastal town of Lowestoft, in Suffolk, which was a regular weekend getaway of his. After the publication of its fourth issue, Cheryl LaGuardia of the Library Journal wrote of the magazine: "All things considered, it might just be a very good thing if the Lowestoft Chronicle were to achieve their goal of world domination."

The magazine has received compliments from Jay Parini, James R. Benn, Laurence Klavan, James Reasoner, Franz Wisner, Sheldon Russell, Matthew P. Mayo, Jim Daniels, and many other authors. It has also been favorably reviewed by the Austrian national radio station FM4 and the literary journal review website The Review Review, which gave Lowestoft Chronicle a five star review on two occasions, describing it as "full of great talent and exceptionally well-written pieces." In their assessment of issue eight, NewPages.com observed: "Lowestoft Chronicle presents entertaining and exciting stories that lend themselves toward travel without dipping completely over into travel writing." Praising Lowestoft Chronicle for its layout, artwork, poetry, and fiction, it noted: "Many of the works take one to far-away and exotic places." Afar magazine placed Lowestoft Chronicle top of its list of best free travel journals, commenting: "Wander around the site and you'll find intriguing stories with a welcome dose of humor in many."

The magazine also publishes a print anthology series. American novelist Luke Rhinehart, author of the cult novel The Dice Man, touted their first anthology as an impetus for inspiring him to want to write short stories again. In Examiner.com, Mary Beth Magee praised the variety and quality of the writing in the 2015 collection Other Places and Frank Mundo said of the 2013 anthology, Intrepid Travelers: "Without a single stinker or filler piece in the bunch, this wonderful 160-page 'little' anthology definitely bids well for the strength of work the online magazine version must regularly publish.” More recently, Kirkus Reviews described An Adventurous Spirit, the 2022 collection, as “a refreshingly original collection” full of “entertaining, varied, and clever writing,” and A Place to Pause, the 2024 collection, as “creative variations on a theme that often makes for vibrant reading." Julia McMichael, writing for Seattle Book Review, considered A Place to Pause “a treasure trove of excellent writing.” Summing up the 2025 collection Unfamiliar Territory Jo Niederhoff of the San Diego Book Review wrote that the anthology “has a mix of humor and wonder which the fiction pieces never quite reach, and which I enjoyed greatly.” Niederhoff concluded that there is “something within this book to appeal to many different styles of readers,” and praised its creative nonfiction as “where I found it to truly shine.”

The magazine has featured in numerous British newspapers, most notably the Lancashire Evening Post, which defined Lowestoft Chronicle as a “refreshingly unique” literary magazine that produces entertaining compendiums of “original and amusing travelogues, poetic reflections, and tales of far-flung adventure that range from science fiction and fantasy to mystery and crime, offering something for all tastes.” The newspaper called Intrepid Travelers "a coruscating cornucopia of humour, drama and big, beautiful adventures", and Other Places "a mouth-watering feast", noting: "Packed into the pages are stories to entice, enthral, and entertain...incisive and enlightening interviews...and a tasty blend of pleasing and deftly prepared poems." It also described the 2018 anthology, Invigorating Passages, as “a rare and dynamic literary collection which grabs readers firmly and sweeps them away to strange and exhilarating places, presenting intriguing situations, colourful characters, and making us yearn to strap on the backpack and go exploring.”

== Anthologies ==
- Lowestoft Chronicle 2011 Anthology (2011)
- Far-flung and Foreign (2012)
- Intrepid Travelers (2013)
- Somewhere, Sometime (2014)
- Other Places (2015)
- Grand Departures (2016)
- Invigorating Passages (2018)
- Steadfast Trekkers (2018)
- The Vicarious Traveler (2019)
- An Adventurous Spirit (2022)
- A Place to Pause (2024)
- Unfamiliar Territory (2025)

== See also ==
- List of literary magazines
