= The Search for the Dice Man =

1993 novel by Luke Rhinehart

- Cover to the UK first edition
- Author: Luke Rhinehart
- Language: English
- Genre: Novel
- Publisher: HarperCollins
- Publication date: 7 June 1993
- Publication place: United States
- Media type: Print (hardback & paperback)
- Pages: 450 pp (hardback edition) & 386 pp (paperback edition)
- ISBN: 0-00-223937-X (hardback edition) & ISBN 0-586-21515-8 (paperback edition)
- OCLC: 28561047
- Preceded by: The Dice Man

The Search for the Dice Man was written by George Cockcroft under the pen name Luke Rhinehart. It is the official sequel to The Dice Man, and was published in 1993.

The story was optioned for a film adaptation in 2009, though none was made.

Other books by George Cockcroft with the same premise: Adventures of Wim, The Book of the Die.

== Plot summary ==
The book is set 20 years after the end of The Dice Man, and Luke's dicechild, Larry Rhinehart, has grown up to become a hotshot investor on the stock market. He has totally rejected his father's reverence for chance: he sees it as an adversary to be overcome, and has managed to create a stable, normal life for himself, in spite of his early abandonment. Indeed, he is due to wed the daughter of his boss, and live wealthily ever after.

This state of affairs would make a dull story and soon his father's ghostly presence intervenes. He gets approached by the FBI, who are trying to trace his father's location, and find out whether he's alive or dead. Though Larry naturally refuses to have anything to do with the FBI, he soon starts to pursue his own investigations. He is financed in this by his fiancée's father, who wants to put the whole dice business to rest, and is accompanied by his fiancée's cousin, an unreformed hippy.

It takes a long time - a whole book in fact, but Larry eventually does complete his quest. Along the way, what he sees and hears change his views somewhat; by the end of the book it is he who is trying to convince Luke, his father, to accept more chance into his life, rather than the other way round.

== Release details ==
- 1993, UK, HarperCollins ISBN 0-00-223937-X, Pub date 7 June 1993, hardback
- 1994, UK, HarperCollins ISBN 0-586-21515-8, Pub date 10 October 1994, paperback
- 1999, UK, HarperCollins ISBN 0-00-651391-3, Pub date 15 December 1999, paperback

== See also ==
- Flipism
