= Ivan Edwards =

Ugandan American medical doctor

Ivan Edwards FAAPMR, FRSA
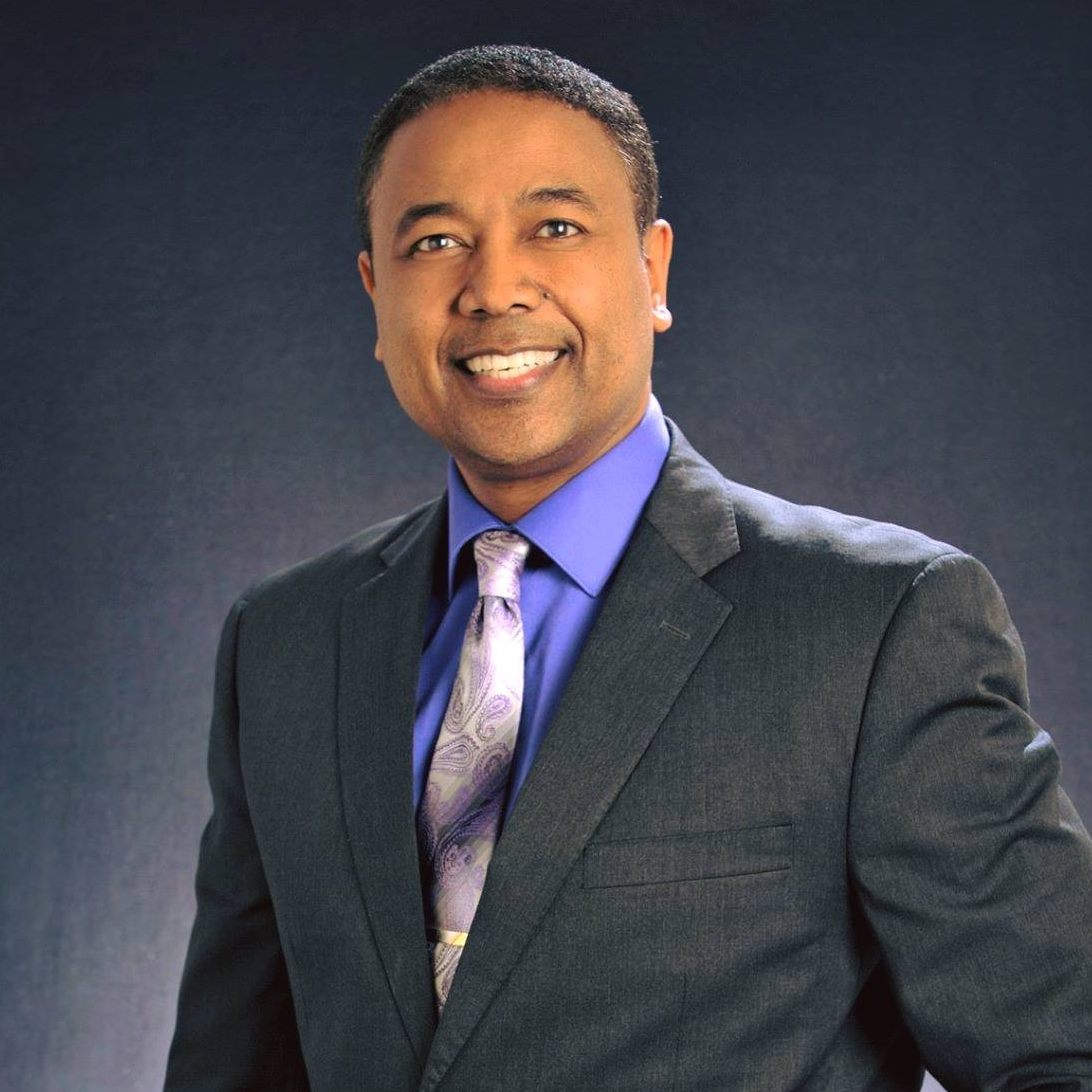
- Born: Kampala, Uganda
- Citizenship: United States
- Education: Rivier University (BS); Midwestern University (D.O.); Eastern Virginia Medical School (Internal medicine); UTHSCSA (PM&R); United States Air Force School of Aerospace Medicine (Flight surgeon)
- Years active: Since 2004
- Known for: Medicine (specialist); Community leadership/activism Public speaking Poetry
- Medical career
- Profession: Medical doctor flight surgeon business owner minister poet
- Field: PM&R; Comprehensive pain management
- Institutions: Jovana Rehab Medicine & Pain; IEME LLC
- Military career
- Allegiance: United States
- Branch: United States Air Force Reserves
- Service years: 2004–current
- Rank: Lieutenant-Colonel
- Website: https://www.drivanedwardsfaapmr.com/

Ivan Edwards is an American doctor, of Ugandan-European heritage, a former pastor, and a US Air Force Reserve flight surgeon, currently serving at the rank of lieutenant colonel. In February 2026, he was selected for promotion to colonel. He is the first known U.S. Air Force flight surgeon of Ugandan descent. He was involved in a community activist role in a neighborhood of Nashua, New Hampshire, and later organized a movement that opposed the sale of a historic cemetery in Uganda. He is a writer and poet. He participates in public speaking. He is CEO and founder of Jovana Rehabilitation Medicine & Pain and IEME LLC, both located in San Antonio, Texas.

== Background and education ==
Edwards is of mixed Ugandan/European descent and experienced racial bias because of his multiracial background. He lived in Uganda throughout the dictatorship reign of Idi Amin – a time of tribulation in which he experienced human rights abuses he described as "a common practice in the bloody dictator’s regime.", In the late 1980s, he emigrated to the USA as part of the diaspora. His emigration was "in search for a better life, and an opportunity to develop [his] potential."

Edwards completed his university, medical school, and postgraduate medical training in the United States. He graduated from Rivier University and later earned his medical degree from Midwestern University. He subsequently completed an internship in internal medicine at Eastern Virginia Medical School in Norfolk, followed by a residency in physical medicine and rehabilitation at the University of Texas Health Science Center at San Antonio.

He is a board certified physiatrist with a specialty focus on neuro-rehabilitation and pain management, and promotes "a holistic approach to healthcare."

He accepted a direct commission as a medical officer in the US Air Force Reserve and had other additional specialized training at the Air Force School of Aerospace Medicine to become a flight surgeon.

== Career ==
=== Medicine and advocacy ===
Besides practicing medicine, both as a reserve flight surgeon and civilian physician, Edwards has appeared on local US and Uganda television to talk about topics on multiple sclerosis and self empowerment. He has also touched on issues of class privilege, social inequities and environmental degradation.

While in ministry in the early 1990s, he helped start a child sponsorship program that provided educational and financial resources to orphaned and displaced children facing poverty in Uganda.

=== Writing and Poetry ===
Edwards is a writer and poet. He has authored opinion articles and op-eds with various literary, medical, and journalistic platforms, including Watchdog Uganda, Doximity, and The Dallas Morning News. He authored an anthology, Resonance of the Soul: Flowers and Harmonics which was awarded The Literary Titan Book Award in Sept 2025.

In November 2025, the Uganda Poetry Society announced and launched the Dr. Ivan Edwards Poetry Award, initially set at US $1,000 as a national annual poetry prize. The award was later increased to US $1,200, with US $200 reserved for a youth category for writers under 18. Organizers indicated that while the award was initially open to Ugandan poets, it would expand regionally and internationally in future years.

=== Public speaking ===
Edwards has spoken at the Uganda Diaspora's international events held annually in Kampala, Uganda. On December 30, 2017, he was a special keynote speaker at the Ugandan diaspora event, after which he received the Ugandan Diaspora Award in recognition of his achievements and advocacy. Vice President of Uganda Edward Ssekandi (who presented him the award) and then-French ambassador to Uganda Stéphanie Rivoal were in attendance.

On September 9, 2020, Edwards presented via webinar on the topic of post-traumatic stress disorder (PTSD), including the impact of COVID-19 on the local community, to an audience of nurses, social workers, case managers and other professionals—under the auspices of the Alamo chapter of the Case Management Society of America.

=== Military career ===
Edwards is an Alamo Wing flight surgeon at the 433rd Aerospace Medicine Squadron at Joint Base San Antonio at Lackland AFB. He joined the U.S. Air Force Reserves in 2004 after completing medical school. In 2008, he was first assigned to the 934th Airlift Wing at Minneapolis-St Paul Joint Air Reserve Station in Minnesota. In 2010, he was then reassigned to the Alamo Wing.

Some of his awards include the Air Force Commendation Medal, and the Military Outstanding Volunteer Service Medal.

=== Social activism ===
==== Community advocacy/leadership – Nashua, New Hampshire ====
Edwards was involved in a community activist role in a Nashua, New Hampshire, neighborhood over the closure of a basketball court in a local park, a place purportedly attracting acts of vandalism, illegal activity and speeding. He came up with a petition, backed by some registered voters in the neighborhood community. Although the drive ultimately failed, it got the attention of top city officials, including Mayor Donald Davidson. The mayor instituted increased police patrols, in response to the community outcry.

==== Cemetery protest and vigil – Kampala European Cemetery, Uganda ====
Edwards organized a movement that opposed the sale of a historic cemetery in Kampala, Uganda, in April 2009. The Kampala European Cemetery, owned by the Kampala City Council, is a cemetery where prominent personalities in Uganda's colonial past, including some of Edwards' ancestral relatives, were laid to rest. The prospective buyers had planned to erect a shopping center to replace the cemetery—a move Edwards vowed to stop from materializing.

Edwards' family was reported to be the first to galvanize opposition to the sale of the historic Kampala European Cemetery. The Kampala City Council then denied the attempted sale and lease of the cemetery to foreign investors. In 2006, city council had received an offer to sell two historic cemeteries, including the Kampala European Cemetery. The offer was reportedly turned down because the council re-designated both cemeteries as tourist attractions.

The news of Edwards' protest and vigils reached the Goan community and beyond, which, in 1972, had been part of the Ugandan diaspora, including Ugandan-Asians (Expulsion of Asians from Uganda). The Goan Voice, announced the protest which helped propel the cause of preserving the cemetery.

By February 2013, due to press coverage and community outcry, the Kampala European Cemetery was finally slated for renovation and deemed a protected historical site.

=== Memberships ===
Some of Edwards' memberships include:

- Member of the American Academy of Physical Medicine and Rehabilitation
- Member of the Aerospace Medical Association
- Member of the Distinguished Society of USAF Flight Surgeons
- Fellow of the American Academy of Physical Medicine and Rehabilitation

== Selected works ==
Edwards, Ivan (2025-07-19). Resonance of the Soul: Flowers and Harmonics (1st ed.). IEME LLC. ISBN 979-8-9989829-1-0.

== Awards and honors (civilian) ==
- 2008–2011, 2013–2020: Patients Choice Awards.
- 2010–2011, 2013–2020: Compassionate Doctor Recognition Awards.
- 2021: Fellow of the Royal Society of Arts.
- 2021: Kentucky Colonel Commission.
- 2025: The Literary Titan Book Award: Poetry.
- 2025: Dr. Ivan Edwards Poetry Award, a national award named after him and established by the Uganda Poetry Society.

== See also ==
- Ugandan Americans
