= The Book of est =

Book by George Cockcroft

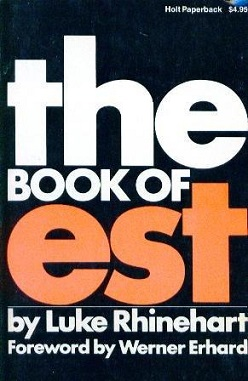
- Book cover, 1976 ed.
- Author: Luke Rhinehart
- Language: English
- Subject: Erhard Seminars Training
- Genre: Fiction
- Publisher: Holt, Rinehart and Winston
- Publication date: October 1976
- Publication place: United States
- Media type: Hardcover
- Pages: 271
- ISBN: 0-03-017386-8
- OCLC: 2317910

The Book of est is a fictional account of the training created by Werner Erhard, (est), or Erhard Seminars Training, first published in 1976 by Holt, Rinehart and Winston. The book was written by est graduate Luke Rhinehart. Rhinehart is the pen name of writer George Cockcroft. The book was endorsed by Erhard, and includes a foreword by him. Its contents attempts to replicate the experience of the est training, with the reader being put in the place of a participant in the course. The end of the book includes a comparison by the author between Erhard's methodologies to Zen, The Teachings of Don Juan by Carlos Castaneda, and to Rhinehart's own views from The Dice Man.

Reception to the book was mixed. There were reviews in Library Journal, Kirkus Reviews, and The New York Times Book Review. An article about Erhard and est in the religious journal Quarterly Review placed the book among "the most accessible sources about est". Professor Walter A. Effross of the American University Washington College of Law cites The Book of est in an article in the Buffalo Law Review analyzing the control of new age movements over their intellectual property.

== Background ==
Werner Erhard (born John Paul Rosenberg), originally from Pennsylvania, migrated to California. He was a former salesman, training manager and executive in the encyclopedia business. He created the Erhard Seminars Training (est) course in 1971. est was a four-day, 60-hour self-help program given to groups of 250 people at a time. The program was very intensive: each day would contain 15–20 hours of instruction. During the training, est personnel utilized specialized terms to convey key concepts, and participants agreed to certain rules which remained in effect for the duration of the course. Participants were taught that they were responsible for their life outcomes.

By 1977 over 100,000 people completed the est training, including public figures and mental health professionals. Est was controversial. It had its critics and proponents. Werner Erhard and Associates repackaged the course as "The Forum", a seminar focused on "goal-oriented breakthroughs". By 1988, approximately one million people had taken some form of the trainings. A group of his associates formed the company Landmark Education in 1991. In 2013 they renamed it Landmark Worldwide LLC. Landmark fully purchased from Erhard the intellectual property in the Forum and other courses by 2002.

== Publication ==
The book was first published in 1976 in a hardcover format by Holt, Rinehart and Winston, and a paperback edition was released later in the same year. It was published in German in 1983 by Hugendubel. In November 2008, Luke Rhinehart, in association with Joe Vitale and Mark J. Ryan, re-released The Book of est as an E-book.

== Contents ==
The Book of est includes a one-page foreword by Werner Erhard. Erhard writes in the foreword that Rhinehart's book "brilliantly ... communicates clearly to the reader both a sense of being in the training room and the spirit of what takes place there." Erhard's foreword notes: "although this book dramatizes the highlights of the training and attempts to give you the vicarious experience of being at a training, this is a book, and the est experience cannot result from reading any book".

With Erhard's endorsement, Rhinehart attempts to replicate the "transformation" experience from est. The book imparts the message that the participant's life "doesn't work", and that after two weekends the individual will come to understand how to "win". The book presents a fictional dramatization of the est training. Punctuation style usage, including exclamation points and boldface type, bring the reader's attention to key items in the text.

Rhinehart describes the est training as a form of participatory theatre, writing: "Seeing the trainer as a master actor ... permits us to evaluate his acts and words more intelligently than if we misinterpret him as being a scholar or scientist giving a lecture." In an analysis of how to approach the est training, Rhinehart comments that "It might best be described, if it can be described at all, as theater—as living theater, participatory theater, encounter theater. Once we begin to see est in these terms, much that fails to fit the scheme of therapy or religion or science begins to make sense."

In Rhinehart's fictional account of the training, the est course leader begins with the instruction: "Let me make one thing clear. I don't want any of you to believe a thing I'm saying. Get that. Don't believe me. Just listen." The est trainer explains that the course techniques are used because "Werner has found that they work." When one of the est participants asks why the instructor says certain statements during the course, the instructor responds: "I'm saying them because Werner has found that the trainer's saying them works."

The concluding portion of the book includes a comparison of Werner Erhard's methodologies to Zen, The Teachings of Don Juan by Carlos Castaneda, and to Rhinehart's views from The Dice Man. Drawing a parallel to the "controlled folly" described in Castaneda's A Separate Reality, Rhinehart argues that in almost all cases, enlightenment is linked to humor: "One can rarely have an enlightenment experience except under the impact of nonsense ... Every time we laugh we are in a way experiencing a mini enlightenment, a tiny letting go of some attachment to some bit of belief or sense. Full enlightenment, in these terms, is accepting what is, which leads to experiencing fully whatever one is experiencing."

Rhinehart comments that those who have taken part in the est training feel the need for a sense of community: "Most graduates indicate that the value of the seminar series depends not so much on its ostensible data content or on the processes introduced, but on the sharing on an intimate basis with others." He notes that some of the graduates of the est training "treat him [Erhard] with the love and awe normally associated with that of disciples for spiritual teachers". He likens Erhard's relationship to his staff members to the way in which a guru interacts with disciples: "[It is] the essentially eastern phenomenon of a powerful being (usually a guru or a spiritual teacher) attracting other powerful beings who nevertheless choose to channel their power through their leader." Rhinehart argues that est "may be seen as in many ways the culmination to date of the 'Easternization of America', a process that first became notable in the late fifties and early sixties".

== Critical reception ==
James Charney notes in his review of the book for Library Journal, "Questions of effectiveness or possible harm are hardly considered." Charney characterizes the problem of the book and its subject matter as a "kind of with-it diffuseness which disallows any intelligent understanding on principle". In a review of the book for The New York Times Book Review, Zane Berzins was critical of the work, commenting: "There isn't much to be said for the book except that it exudes a kind of repellent fascination." A review of the book in Kirkus Reviews was negative; the review characterizes it as, "Not a book, really. A verbatim transcription of one of Werner Erhard's weekend sessions in $250 doublethink." Kirkus Reviews criticizes the author for not engaging in any judgmental analysis of the est training methodology. The review concludes, "at least the reader finally has an opportunity to see what an estian seminar is, with vomit bags, circuitous logic, pathetic interplay between overbearing trainer and angst-ridden trainee, and all."

In an article about Erhard and est for the religious journal Quarterly Review, Florida International University assistant religious studies professor Robert R. Hann places the book among "the most accessible sources about est". Hann comments that since the book has been "reviewed by Erhard and carries his statement of support for the author", it "can therefore be presumed to be, if not 'canonical,' then at least not significantly at odds with the perspective of est itself."

Professor Walter A. Effross of the American University Washington College of Law cites The Book of est along with Adelaide Bry's est: 60 Hours That Transform Your Life, in an article in the Buffalo Law Review analyzing the control of new age movements over their intellectual property. Effross notes that the copyright page of The Book of est gives a notice that: "material based in part on unpublished lectures created and copyrighted by Werner Erhard and used by the author with his permission. No material created and copyrighted by Werner Erhard may be used or disseminated in any medium or language without his prior written authorization." Effross comments on the potential loss of control over his material that Erhard may have invited due to endorsing these books about his methodology: "...because it enabled commentators to make 'fair use' of the disclosed information, it was not helpful for ... Werner Erhard, the founder of est, to endorse a first-person account of an est training, even one which provided only simulations of est's 'processes,' or guided meditations. (However, the publicity [Erhard's organization] achieved from such exposure during crucial periods of ... expansion may have been seen as justifying the intellectual property risk.)"

== See also ==
- Getting It: The Psychology of est
- Human Potential Movement
- Large Group Awareness Training
- New age
