= Finding Sutton's Choice =

2025 contemporary women's fiction novel

- First US Edition
- Author: Brenda Haas
- Language: English
- Genre: Literary Fiction, Women's fiction
- Publisher: Orange Hat Publishing
- Publication date: June 3, 2025
- Media type: Print (Paperback)
- Pages: 310 (first edition, paperback)
- ISBN: 978-1-645-38238-6 (first edition, paperback)

Finding Sutton's Choice is a 2025 contemporary women's fiction novel written by American author Brenda Haas; her debut novel. It follows the story of Charlotte Sutton as she navigates complicated family dynamics and the failing health of her father as it relates to Alzheimer's/dementia.

The setting of this novel is the Lakeside, Ohio Chautauqua, which is of significance to Haas, as it is both where she got married and her current residence.

== Plot ==
Charlotte Sutton, a 28-year-old writer living in Pittsburgh, finds herself returning to her hometown of Lakeside, Ohio after ten years of estrangement. Her return is prompted by a voicemail about the health of her father, Chuck Sutton, a former baseball player, newspaper editor, and well known member of the Lakeside community.

Charlotte's relationship with her father has been tense from childhood, largely due to feelings of neglect and the circumstances surrounding her parent's divorce. Having left Lakeside as a young adult, she spends the next ten years distancing herself from this past.

Upon returning to Lakeside, Charlotte is confronted with the fact that her father is struggling with Alzheimer's, his marina and newspaper business failing. She also discovers a half-brother, Adam, she was never aware of, which further strains this relationship. Although Charlotte originally intended to stay just a few days, she becomes increasingly re-involved in her father, his newspaper business, and the Lakeside community once again. Her extended stay also requires her to reconsider her future and her career, now faced with the responsibilities of caring for her father and half-brother.

Her return also brings her in contact with Jake, who supports Charlotte and Chuck throughout the novel, as well as people from her past, including her childhood best friend Sammy, old rivals and bullies, and family friends of her childhood. Each of these reunions expose unresolved conflict or shifting misconceptions about the past.

The story alternates between past and present, gradually revealing details of Charlotte's childhood and family history as Chuck's health worsens. Through her relationships with Adam, Chuck, Jake, and others from her Lakeside begins to reassess her childhood experience and longstanding resentments. These developments force her to reconsider the possibility of rebuilding relationships with her family and the small Ohio town she still holds dear.

== Reception ==
Finding Sutton's Choice has received positive reviews, with Kirkus Reviews calling it "a tender family story with familiar beats, elevated by strong characters and engaging prose." Other reviews emphasize Haas' development and treatment of characters as well as her reflective and literary writing style.

The setting of this novel has also been praised as a strength of this book, praising her "literary and world building/immersion into the Lakeside setting." Haas' personal ties to the setting and circumstances have also resulted in book proceeds from certain events benefiting the Lakeside Chautauqua Foundation and/or Alzheimer's Association.

Other reviews found this to be a challenging and emotional read, especially if the reader has someone in their life dealing with dementia or Alzheimer’s. Reviews also highlight that this is a purposeful and slow read, with Book Shelfie stating "This isn’t a fast-paced book, and it’s not trying to be. It’s slower and more focused on sitting with emotions than rushing through events."

=== Awards and nominations ===
Year and Award	Category	Result	Ref
2026 Kirkus Indie Awards	Literary fiction	Finalist	
2026 (Overall) PenCraft Book Award	General Fiction	Won	
2026 (Winter) PenCraft Book Award	General Fiction	Won	
2026 Reader's Favorite Awards	Women's Fiction	Silver	
2025 (September) Literary Titan Gold Book Award	Fiction	Won	
2025 (November) International Impact Book Award	Aging	Won	
2025 (November) International Impact Book Award	Women's Fiction	Won	
