= Flip Decision =

- Walt Disney's Comics and Stories #561 (1991) cover. This issue contained a reprint of "Flip Decision", and its cover refers to the story. Cover art by William Van Horn.
- Story code: W WDC 149-01
- Story: Carl Barks
- Ink: Carl Barks
- Date: June 30, 1952
- Hero: Donald Duck
- Pages: 10
- Layout: 4 rows per page
- Appearances: Donald Duck; Huey, Dewey, and Louie; Daisy Duck; April, May, and June (debut)
- First publication: Walt Disney's Comics and Stories #149; February 1953

"Flip Decision" is a Donald Duck comic book story written and illustrated by Carl Barks in June 1952. Like many other Barks stories, it was originally untitled. In the story, Donald becomes an adherent of a philosophy of life called flipism, in which all decisions in life are made by flipping a coin.

== Publications ==
The story first appeared in Walt Disney's Comics and Stories #149 in February 1953. It has later appeared in Walt Disney's Comics and Stories #365 (February 1971), #507 (1984), and #561 (July 1991).

Outside of the United States, the story has been published in Argentina, Australia, Belgium, Brazil, Denmark, the Faroe Islands, Finland, France, Germany, Greece, Italy, Latvia, the Netherlands, Norway, Poland, Spain, Sweden, Turkey, and probably other countries.

== Plot ==
Life is but a gamble!
Let Flipism chart your ramble.

— Flippist slogan, from "Flip Decision"

Donald Duck happens to enter a lecture held by a charlatan calling himself Professor Batty, who claims that flipism — the philosophy of using coin flipping to make all decisions in life — is the solution to everyone's problems. The professor persuades a confused Donald to buy a membership of the "Great Society of Flippists", as well as book introducing the "methods and benefits of Flipism". Reading the book, Donald quickly becomes a devoted flippist. When his nephews want to go see a movie called Gore in the Gully, Donald uses a coin flip to decide that they shall take a leisurely drive instead.

The downsides of flipism begin to reveal themselves during the drive. Donald keeps flipping a coin to decide where to drive, eventually getting lost, and ultimately driving in the wrong direction of traffic before colliding head on with a large truck. Donald and his nephews are physically unharmed, but Donald is sentenced to pay a fine for "letting a dime do [his] thinking", rather than the usual (smaller) fines for violating traffic rules.

Donald holds Professor Batty responsible for his fate, and attempts to find him. However, the professor has disappeared, and Donald, despite having lost his belief in the philosophy, resolves to use flipism to find him. Flipism leads him to a house with two apartments, and he flips a coin to select which apartment to go for. Donald is unable to see the result (apartment 2) in the dark, and knocks on apartment 1's door instead. His girlfriend, Daisy Duck, opens the door and it turns out that this apartment is the home of Daisy's unseen sister. Daisy is furious at Donald for forgetting that he had invited her to go to the movies that day. After Daisy has finished her tirade, Donald has forgotten about his search for Professor Batty, and ends up taking Daisy, her nieces, and his nephews to see Gore in the Gully.

The final panel reveals that flipism actually worked in Donald's search for Professor Batty, showing that a frightened Batty is located in apartment 2 waiting for someone to find him.

== Themes and impact ==
"Flip Decision" introduced the term flipism. Similar concepts appear in several other works, including Luke Rhinehart's 1971 novel The Dice Man, in which dice are used instead of a coin. Media studies professor Helge Rønning has interpreted "Flip Decision" as a satire over existentialism.

The story features several themes that are common in Carl Barks' stories, including questionable professors and self-inflicted bad luck.

The story introduced Daisy's nieces, April, May and June, who would become regular characters in Disney comics. As in later stories, they appear as counterparts of Huey, Dewey and Louie.

== See also ==
- List of Disney comics by Carl Barks
