= Matthew P. Mayo =

American author

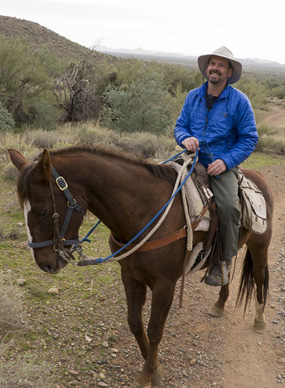
- Matthew P. Mayo
- Education: Lyndon State College (BA); Goddard College (MFA)
- Occupations: Novelist; poet; non-fiction writer; short story writer
- Spouse: Jennifer Smith-Mayo
- Website: matthewmayo.com

Matthew P. Mayo is an American author of novels and non-fiction books, poetry, short stories, articles, and reviews. He writes about the American West, New England, and in the Western, humor, crime, and horror genres.

== Life ==
Mayo earned his B.A. in English at Lyndon State College, in Lyndonville, Vermont, and his M.F.A. in creative writing at Goddard College, Plainfield, Vermont. He is married to photographer Jennifer Smith-Mayo.

== Bibliography ==
Novels

- Winter Wolves (A Roamer Western) (2021)
- Guns of the Greenhorn (2021) (A Ralph Compton Western)
- The Too-Late Trail (2021) (A Ralph Compton Western)
- Dilly (2020)
- The Outfit (Book 3): Outlawed! (2018)
- The Outfit (Book 2): Blood and Ashes (2018)
- Timberline (A Roamer Western) (2018)
- North of Forsaken (A Roamer Western) (2017)
- Stranded: A Story of Frontier Survival (2017)
- The Outfit (Book 1): To Hell and Back (2016)
- Shotgun Charlie (2015) (A Ralph Compton Western)
- Double Cross Ranch (2014) (A Ralph Compton Western)
- The Hunted (2013) (A Ralph Compton Western)
- Dead Man’s Ranch (2012) (A Ralph Compton Western)
- Tucker’s Reckoning (2012) (A Ralph Compton Western)
- Hot Lead, Cold Heart (2008)
- Wrong Town (A Roamer Western) (2008)
- Winters’ War (2007)

Non-Fiction

- Hornswogglers, Fourflushers, and Snake-Oil Salesmen: True Tales of the Old West’s Sleaziest Swindlers (2015)
- Myths and Mysteries of New Hampshire: True Stories of the Unsolved and Unexplained (2014)
- Speaking Ill of the Dead: Jerks in New England History (2013)
- Sourdoughs, Claim Jumpers & Dry Gulchers: Fifty of the Grittiest Moments in the History of Frontier Prospecting (2012)
- Vermont Icons: 50 Classic Symbols of the Green Mountain State (2012)
- New Hampshire Icons: 50 Classic Symbols of the Granite State (2012)
- Haunted Old West: Phantom Cowboys, Spirit-Filled Saloons, Mystical Mine Camps, and Spectral Indians (2012)
- Maine Icons: 50 Classic Icons of the Pine Tree State (2011)
- Bootleggers, Lobstermen & Lumberjacks: Fifty of the Grittiest Moments in the History of Hardscrabble New England (2010)
- Cowboys, Mountain Men & Grizzly Bears: Fifty of the Grittiest Moments in the History of the Wild West (2009)

Short Stories

Mayo's short stories have been collected in a variety of anthologies, including:

- “Bloodline” (novella) in Fire Mountain and Other Survival Stories (2021, Five Star Publishing)
- “The Last Drop” in Why Cows Need Cowboys (2021, TwoDot)
- “Peaches” in The Spoilt Quilt (2019, Five Star Publishing)
- “Lucky Tam’s ‘A Tramp’s Tales’ ” in Moving Foreword (2019, BenBella Books)
- “Snake Farm” in The Untamed West (2018, Western Fictioneers)
- “A Small Thing” in The Trading Post & Other Frontier Stories, A Five Star Anthology (2018, edited by Hazel Rumney)
- “Roadside Attraction” in Somewhere, Sometime … Lowestoft Chronicles 2014 Anthology (2014, edited by Nicholas Litchfield)
- “Pay the Ferryman” in Livin’ On Jacks and Queens (2013, edited by Robert J. Randisi)
- “Chapter One” in Wolf Creek, Book 7: The Quick and the Dying, a multi-author novel published by Western Fictioneers under the name "Ford Fargo" (2013)
- “Call of the Arctic Siren” in The Avenger: Roaring Heart of the Crucible (2013, edited by Nancy Holder & Joe Gentile)
- “Chapter Five” in Wolf Creek, Book 3: Murder in Dogleg City, a multi-author novel published by Western Fictioneers under the name "Ford Fargo" (2012)
- “O Unholy Night: A Roamer & Maple Jack Tale” in Six-Guns and Slay Bells: A Creepy Cowboy Christmas (2012, Western Fictioneers)
- “Lost Valley of the Skoocoom: A Maple Jack Tale” in Beat to a Pulp: Round 2 (2012, edited by David Cranmer and Matthew P. Mayo)
- “The Folly of Flight” in Sherlock Holmes: The Crossovers Casebook (2012, edited by Howard Hopkins)
- “The Horrors of Expectation” in Bad Austen: The Worst Stories Jane Never Wrote (2011, edited by Peter Archer and Jennifer Lawler)
- “Catch As Catch Can: A Maple Jack Tale” in The Traditional West: A Western Fictioneers Anthology (2011, Western Fictioneers)
- “The Witch Hole” in How the West Was Weird, Vol. II (2011, edited by Russ Anderson, Jr.)
- “Maple Jack and the Christmas Kid” in Christmas Campfire Companion: Short Stories from Today’s Top Western Writers (2011, edited by Chila Woychik)
- “Get Teague!” in Needle: A Magazine of Noir, Issue #3/Winter/Vol I (2010, edited by Steve Weddle)
- “Scourge of the Spoils” in Steampunk’d (2010, edited by Jean Rabe and Martin H. Greenberg)
  - “Scourge of the Spoils” also appeared in Western Fictioneers Presents: Peacemaker Tales (2013) and Western Fictioneers Presents: Peacemakers, Vol. 3 (2013)
- “Been a Long Time” in Timeshares (2010, edited by Jean Rabe and Martin H. Greenberg)
- “Half a Pig” in A Fistful of Legends: 21 All-New Blazing Tales of the Old West (2010, edited Nik Morton)
- “Kin” in Out of the Gutter 5: The Modern Journal of Pulp Fiction and Degenerate Literature (2008, edited by Matthew Louis)
- “Snows of Montana” in Where Legends Ride: New Tales of the Old West (2007, edited by Matthew P. Mayo)

== Critical reception ==
Mayo’s Roamer series—Wrong Town (2008), North of Forsaken (2017), Timberline (2018), and Winter Wolves (2021)—has been praised for its authentic frontier settings and a nuanced protagonist. Nicholas Litchfield of the Lancashire Post described North of Forsaken as “solidly entertaining,” commending Mayo for “revitalizing classic Western tropes,” while calling Timberline “a nimbly told tale of rough justice and frontier survival with fierce action.” Jeanne Greene of Booklist noted the slow start in North of Forsaken, remarking that “Roamer describes every trout tickled and rabbit skinned on the trail,” while Reg Quist praised the series’ cultured protagonist as “refreshing” and deemed Timberline “a readable and intriguing adventure novel.”

Mayo’s Outfit trilogy (To Hell and Back, Blood and Ashes, Outlawed!), blends Western and suspense elements. Litchfield found Outlawed! “fun and fiercely entertaining,” while Quist described Blood and Ashes as “an action-filled fantasy tale placed in the Old West.” The Midwest Book Review termed it “another riveting western” from Mayo that “will prove to be an enduringly popular addition to community library collections.”

Among Mayo’s standalones, Stranded, based on a true story, received positive reviews. Booklist’s Quist called it “a well-written and interesting page-turner” where Mayo skillfully exposes the protagonist’s strengths and weaknesses. Litchfield considered it “gripping, unsettling, and deeply affecting,” and Thomas J. Howley of the Historical Novel Society praised its journal-entry format, noting: “Interludes with bears, wolves and especially a rapacious mountain lion are as terrifying as any horror novel.”

Half a Pig and Other Stories of the West, a short story collection, was noted for its variety and Western themes. Sarah Steers of Booklist cited its broad appeal, while the Midwest Book Review described it as “a fun and memorable read.”

Mayo’s nonfiction, including Maine Icons: 50 Classic Symbols of the Pine Tree State (coauthored with Jennifer Smith-Mayo), has drawn praise for engaging, accessible essays and photographs that provide an approachable overview of Maine’s heritage. The authors have discussed their personal connection to Maine and a thoughtful selection process that balances well-known and lesser-known symbols to capture the state’s character beyond clichés. Bootleggers, Lobstermen & Lumberjacks was recognized for vivid, imaginatively reconstructed historical episodes, while Hornswogglers, Fourflushers & Snake-Oil Salesmen profiles Old West con artists in a way that captured reader interest, though some reviews noted the unverified dialogue requires reader acceptance.

== Awards ==
Mayo has won many awards, finalist honors, and nominations for his writing, including the Western Heritage Award, the Peacemaker, Western Writers of America Spur Award, High Plains Book Award, the Willa Award, and the Will Rogers Medallion, among others.

- 2022 Finalist, Western Writers of America Spur Award, Best Mass Market Paperback Novel, for The Too-Late Trail
- 2021 Western Writers of America Spur Award for Best Western Juvenile Fiction for Dilly
- 2021 Will Rogers Silver Medallion Award for Young Adult Western Fiction for Dilly
- 2021 High Plains Books Awards, finalist, for Young Adult Book for Dilly
- 2020 Will Rogers Bronze Medallion Award for Western Short Story "Peaches"
- 2018 Western Heritage Wrangler Award for Outstanding Western Novel by the National Cowboy & Western Heritage Museum for Stranded: A Story of Frontier Survival
- 2018 Western Writers of America Spur Award for Best Western Juvenile Fiction for Stranded: A Story of Frontier Survival
- 2018 Western Fictioneers Peacemaker Award for Best Young Adult Western Novel for Stranded: A Story of Frontier Survival
- 2018 Willa Award for Best Historical Fiction by Women Writing the West for Stranded: A Story of Frontier Survival
- 2018 High Plains Books Award for Young Adult Book for Stranded: A Story of Frontier Survival
- 2018 Will Rogers Gold Medallion Award for Young Adult Western Fiction Stranded: A Story of Frontier Survival
- 2018 Western Fictioneers Peacemaker Award Finalist for Best Western Novel for Timberline (A Roamer Western)
- 2018 Moonbeam Children's Book Awards, Silver, for Young Adult Historical Fiction for Stranded: A Story of Frontier Survival
- 2017 LitPick 5-Star Award for Stranded: A Story of Frontier Survival
- 2013 Western Writers of America's Spur Award for Best Western Short Novel for Tucker’s Reckoning
- 2010 Finalist, Western Fictioneers Peacemaker Award for Short Fiction for “Scourge of the Spoils”
- 2010 Finalist, Western Writers of America's Spur Award for Short Fiction for “Half a Pig”
