= Literary Titan Book Awards =

The Literary Titan Book Awards are monthly book awards established in 2017 by Literary Titan, an organization of professional editors, writers, and professors.

The Lowestoft Chronicle describes Literary Titan as “a prominent U.S.-based literary publication”

They review books across genres, conduct author interviews, and recognize selected authors with awards. The awards recognize excellence in fiction and nonfiction across independent and traditional publishing, with gold and silver distinctions conferred to authors whose works demonstrate originality, creativity, and impact.

== History ==
The awards were first announced in 2017, with recipients selected from books reviewed by Literary Titan. The Literary Titan Book Award is recognized outside its own platform, with coverage highlighting its role in celebrating diverse, high‑quality writing.

== Criteria ==
Books are evaluated based on their inclusion of complex characters, intricate worlds, and thought provoking themes, as well as the ease with which the story is told.

Bernews reports that the awards “recognize excellence in books that exemplify exceptional storytelling, character development, and thematic depth.”

Awards are divided into Gold and Silver categories, with Gold signifying the highest level of distinction, while Silver recognizes works of high quality and impact. Awards are bestowed monthly and include a full book review, and the competition does not require membership to enter.

The organization reviews fiction and nonfiction books and gives out awards almost monthly.

== Notable recipients ==
- Steven Bernstein (Gold)
- Cathy Burnham Martin (Silver)
- Aleksa Đukanović (Gold)
- Ivan Edwards (Gold)
- Tosca Lee (Silver & Gold)
- Nicholas Litchfield (Gold)
- Orna Ross (Gold)
- Julia Zolotova (Silver)

== Other considerations ==
Independent reporting indicates that some publishers encourage authors to submit their books to the Literary Titan Book Awards for consideration.
