= Getting It: The Psychology of est =

Non-fiction book by Sheridan Fenwick

Getting It
- Book cover, 1976 ed.
- Author: Sheridan Fenwick
- Cover artist: Robert Anthony (jacket design)
- Language: English
- Subject: Erhard Seminars Training
- Genre: Applied psychology
- Published: September 16, 1976
- Publisher: J. B. Lippincott Company
- Publication place: United States
- Media type: Print (hardback)
- Pages: 191
- ISBN: 0-397-01170-9
- Dewey Decimal: 158
- LC Class: RC489.E7 F46

Getting It: The Psychology of est is a non-fiction book by American clinical psychologist Sheridan Fenwick first published in 1976 which analyses Werner Erhard's Erhard Seminars Training or est. Fenwick based the book on her own experience of attending a four-day session of the est training, an intensive 60-hour personal-development course in the self-help genre. Large groups of up to 250 people took the est training at one time.

In the first section of Fenwick's book, she recounts the est training process and the methods used during the course. Fenwick details the rules or "agreements" laid out by the trainers to the attendees, which include not talking to others or leaving the session to go to the bathroom unless during an announced break period. The second section is analytic: Fenwick analyzes the methods used by the est trainers, evaluates the course's potential effects, and discusses Erhard's background. Fenwick concludes that the program's long-term effects are unknown, the est training may not be appropriate for certain groups of people, and that a large proportion of participants report perceived positive effects.

Writing in Library Journal, psychiatrist James Charney describes the book as "the only useful critical look" at the training. Zane Berzins of The New York Times Book Review characterizes the book as a "calm and professionally informed view". Hearings held in 1979 before the United States House of Representatives on a juvenile delinquents program depicted in Scared Straight! cited the book for background on the est training, as did psychologist Gidi Rubinstein in a 2005 study of the Landmark Forum published in the academic journal Psychology and Psychotherapy: Theory, Research and Practice.

== Background ==
Werner Erhard (born John Paul Rosenberg), was originally from Pennsylvania and migrated to California. A former salesman, training manager and executive in the encyclopedia business, Erhard created the Erhard Seminars Training (est) course in 1971. est was a form of Large Group Awareness Training, and was part of the Human Potential Movement. est was a four-day, 60-hour self-help program given to groups of 250 people at a time. The program was very intensive: each day would contain 15–20 hours of instruction. During the training, est personnel utilized specialized vocabulary to convey key concepts, and participants agreed to rules which remained in effect for the duration of the course. Participants were taught that they were responsible for their life outcomes.

Est had its critics and proponents. A year after Getting It was published, over 100,000 people completed the est training, including public figures and mental health professionals. In 1985, Werner Erhard and Associates repackaged the course as "The Forum", a seminar focused on "goal-oriented breakthroughs". By 1988, approximately one million people had taken some form of the trainings. In the early 1990s Erhard faced family problems, as well as tax problems that were eventually resolved in his favor. A group of his associates formed the company Landmark Education in 1991.

== Author ==
Sheridan Fenwick, in her early thirties when Getting It was published, had graduated with a Bachelor of Arts degree from Goucher College and received a doctorate in psychopathology and social psychology from Cornell University. Her Ph.D. dissertation was published in 1975. Fenwick served as the director of social policy in the Department of City Planning of Chicago, Illinois, as assistant attending psychologist at Montefiore Medical Center, and as a faculty member of Columbia University's department of psychology.

Fenwick writes that although she had been trained as a clinical psychologist, she avoided "consciousness" movements and never participated in transactional analysis or similar therapies, including Transcendental Meditation, Esalen, Arica, Gestalt therapy and Mind Dynamics. When she met with graduates of the est training and heard their testimonials and observed their level of self-confidence, she considered taking the training.

After some preliminary research, Fenwick decided to take the training as a participant rather than as a professional observer. She paid the $250.00 course fee and enrolled in a four-day est program to examine its methods and its appeal. She reports that the training was an "extraordinary experience", but that she had "serious concerns about the implications of the est phenomenon", and that people should know more about it. The book was first published September 16, 1976, by J. B. Lippincott Company. A second edition was published by Penguin Books in 1977. Fenwick went on to work as director of the Behavioral Medicine Clinic at Abbott Northwestern Hospital in Minneapolis, before retiring in 1993 to set up Psybar, an online service to provide psychological experts for court cases.

== Contents ==
The book comprises two sections. The first section describes Fenwick's own experiences of the training; the second analyzes the est program's methodology and effects. In her analysis of the course, she states:

"While the consensus of informed opinion, based on summaries of research findings, is that interventions similar to the est training have only modestly positive effects, I think that the existing research provides us with an underestimate of the effect of the est training. This training represents a distillation of some of the most powerful techniques and central precepts for attitude and behavior change ... I would guess that the effects of the est training are substantial for a large proportion of people."

In the latter portion of the book Fenwick discusses comparisons of the est training to brainwashing and to psychotherapy, potential harmful effects of the course, and the extent that positive benefit from the course may be attributed to a self-fulfilling prophecy. Fenwick sees est as a form of psychotherapy that utilizes "in" therapies, and questions its suitability for certain individuals. Fenwick writes that the est training draws influences from Synanon, Gestalt therapy, encounter groups, and Scientology. She discusses the potential positive and negative psychological effects that can occur subsequent to taking the est training. She analyzes the rules of the training, and the behavioral tools used by the trainers, and points out that the est personnel are not qualified to assess psychopathology. Fenwick asserts that tactics including sensory deprivation and the large group setting of 250 people at a time help to make the training "work". She describes this as a "compression chamber effect", and asserts that it leads to the "hysterical confessions and the euphoric testimonials" she observed in the course.

Fenwick cites the secrecy of the est organization as an impediment to meaningful study, and states that the studies cited by est itself are inadequate and inconclusive. Fenwick writes that a lack of "sophisticated research designs" limits the ability to properly determine long-term benefits or harm caused by the course and notes: "est uses techniques indiscriminately which, in a certain proportion of the population, are known to be harmful and potentially quite dangerous". She concludes that it is difficult to determine whether est "produces any more than a superficial catharsis, or whether it might be harmful to certain people", and states that the long-range effects of the training remain unknown.

While reporting on testimonials of "perceived" changes as a result of the est training, Fenwick asks rhetorically:

"Should we completely discount the testimonials of est graduates, knowing that they are not sufficiently rigorous measures to qualify as scientific evidence? I don't think so. The fact that positive testimonials are so readily obtained from est graduates, in combination with the observation that a majority of people who take the est training, continue to participate and have found the est experience to be rewarding. Even if 'objective' changes are not documented in people's lives, it is noteworthy that people feel happier, more satisfied, more relaxed, and more 'alive.' If you 'feel' happier, then you 'are' happier – objective circumstances notwithstanding. Subjective states are clearly an important component of our lives."

== Reception ==
Getting It received mixed, but generally positive, reviews. One positive evaluation came from psychiatrist James Charney, in a 1976 review for Library Journal. Charney calls the book "the only useful critical look at this essential issue", referring to the est training. He notes in particular that Fenwick's "analysis of the function of the group, the restrictive rules, and the enforced discomfort is convincing". In a 1977 review in Library Journal Edith Crockett and Ellis Mount highly recommended the book, commenting that "A plethora of newspaper and magazine reports, along with books written by graduates ... have attempted to explain the phenomenon of this self-help program, but none has done it as well or as objectively as this writer." Kirkus Reviews noted the precedent set by the analytical nature of the book, writing "Finally. Here's someone who is willing to disclose the details of Erhard Seminars Training, and then go on to analyze them from a psychological point of view." Zane Berzins, writing for The New York Times Book Review in 1977, describes Fenwick's work as a "calm and professionally informed view". Berzins describes the book as a "brave attempt" at an analysis of est's appeal, and concludes that "It's hardly an incendiary exposé, but Fenwick's open-minded scrutiny should deglamourize the est movement."

William McGurk reviewed the book in Contemporary Psychology. Although McGurk praises the book's description of the est seminars, noting that it "present[s] a clear picture of the process", he also criticizes Fenwick's subsequent analysis, saying she "sounds like a different person" than in the first section. McGurk writes that "It's as though she put on her psychoanalytically oriented, professional hat and ran a tape that was far from being effective." A review in Publishers Weekly states that Fenwick's "inbred detachment may have kept her from the full impact of the 'experience' the training was meant to be (and is for many)". Even so, the review notes that Fenwick "scores heavily" in the section where she questions the nature of the est training and Erhard's background; it recommends that Getting It be read alongside Luke Rhinehart's The Book of est.

The book is recommended by James R. Lewis and J. Gordon Melton's 1992 book Perspectives on the New Age, where they describe it as "a thorough discussion of est training methods and the psychology behind them". Other works that cite the book for background on est include Snapping: America's Epidemic of Sudden Personality Change, by Flo Conway and Jim Siegelman; and Evaluating a Large Group Awareness Training, a study commissioned by Erhard's successor company to est, Werner Erhard and Associates.

Fenwick's work was cited in 1979 hearings before the United States House of Representatives on a controversial program for juvenile delinquents, which was depicted in the Academy Award-winning documentary film Scared Straight!. Getting It is cited in background discussion of the est training: "Fenwick has pointed out that sophisticated assessment of individual psychopathology is beyond the competence and training of the est personnel; it is also outside the est value system, since the training is held to be almost universally beneficial." Psychologist Gidi Rubinstein cites the book as a reference in a 2005 study of the Landmark Forum, a course descended from the est training, which he presented in the academic journal Psychology and Psychotherapy: Theory, Research and Practice.
