= Long Voyage Back =

1983 novel by George Cockcroft

- First edition
- Author: Luke Rhinehart
- Language: English
- Genre: Science fiction
- Publisher: Delacorte
- Publication date: 1983
- Publication place: United States
- Media type: Print
- Pages: 395
- ISBN: 9780440046172
- OCLC: 9112243

Long Voyage Back was written by George Cockcroft under the pen name of Luke Rhinehart. It was published in 1983, at the height of the Cold War, and it shows that influence. The author sides with the nuclear disarmament side of the debate and the only character in the book with vociferous views on the subject, the daughter of the lead character, probably represents his own views. It also reflects his love of sailing.

== Plot summary ==
"In a nuclear war, the USSR will win. This is because the average Russian doesn't have a gun, so they can't all shoot each other and the army for food"

The story concerns a hypothetical World War III between the USSR and the United States, and graphically depicts the ensuing carnage. One family and some friends try to run away in a sailboat, and the story describes their battles with nuclear winter and fallout, and with the ensuing collapse of civilization.

== Reception ==
Dave Pringle reviewed Long Voyage Back for Imagine magazine, and stated that "it does not live up to one's expectations of yet another 'cosy catastrophe' [...] There are no pastoral fantasies of Noble Self Sufficiency here."
