= Nicholas Litchfield =

British-born author and editor

- Born: England
- Education: Anglia Ruskin University; University of Brighton
- Occupations: Author, editor, critic
- Writing career
- Genres: Crime fiction, mystery fiction
- Notable works: Hessman’s Necklace; When The Actor Inspired Chaos and Bloodshed; Swampjack Virus
- Website: nicholaslitchfield.com

Nicholas Litchfield is a British-born author, editor, and critic known for his work in crime and mystery fiction. He is the founding editor of the Lowestoft Chronicle, an online literary magazine established in 2009 and based in Boston, Massachusetts. Inspired by the English town of Lowestoft, the magazine publishes international fiction, poetry, and creative nonfiction, and is known for its annual anthologies. Litchfield's novels and critical work have been praised in multiple independent outlets.

== Early life ==
Born in England, Litchfield started writing for newspapers at age fifteen. Between 1992 and 1996, he was a regular contributor to The Citizen, a group of weekly regional newspapers distributed throughout Bedfordshire and Buckinghamshire. He earned his B.A. in English at Anglia Ruskin University in Cambridge, and his Master's degree in library science at the University of Brighton in East Sussex. Afterward, he worked as a researcher for the BBC in London and, later, as a librarian in Norfolk and other parts of the U.K. He has since worked in various cities around the world.

== Career ==
Litchfield reviews crime and thriller fiction for Publishers Weekly and other outlets and has contributed essays to thirty anthologies of mid-century crime fiction, as well as to publications such as Colorado Review, The Virginian-Pilot, and The Daily Press. His editorial projects and critical writing have been favorably covered by respected sources such as Booklist, Bookgasm, Crime Time, Midwest Book Review, the Lancashire Post, and Film International. Notable authors including Martin Edwards and James Reasoner have commended his work.

== Novels ==
Litchfield's debut novel, Swampjack Virus (2013), was praised by the Lancashire Post for its “ironic undertones, charismatic cast, and nail-biting suspense.” His second novel, When The Actor Inspired Chaos and Bloodshed (2025), set in 1990s Uruguay, received attention from Kirkus Reviews, which highlighted its “sardonic vigor” and described it as “a pulpy, imperfect sendup of moviemaking.” The Yorkshire Evening Post called it “an intense and topical drama... erupting into a massive blaze of mesmerising chaos.”

Other reviewers, including Literary Titan and Indies Today, praised the novel's bold risks and unconventional characters, while a Reedsy Discovery review noted its strong structure and wit, alongside its polarizing style. Novelist Adam Berlin likened its grittiness to “a 1970s car-chase shot with a handheld camera, full of jolts and scrapes and Technicolor chaos.” The novel was recognized as a 2026 Notable in the Indies Today Awards, an annual distinction for books that have made a significant impression on reviewers and readers. Litchfield has credited international bestselling author George Powers Cockcroft (Luke Rhinehart) with feedback that influenced the book's development.

His most recent novel, Hessman’s Necklace (2025), has been described by Kirkus Reviews as “a feverish story that effectively turns neo-noir conventions on its head.” The Sheffield Star and Literary Titan praised its swift pace and inventive take on noir. Reviews in Indies Today and Reedsy Discovery highlighted its “punchy storytelling” and well-drawn characters, while also observing its deep immersion in genre tropes. Edgar Award-winner Laurence Klavan described it as a blend of “the impeccable plotting of The Maltese Falcon with the canny post-modernism of Chinatown.” In 2026, Hessman’s Necklace was named a Finalist in the Suspense category of the Next Generation Indie Book Awards, and was also a Finalist in the Mystery/Suspense: Hard-Boiled/Crime category of The 2026 American Fiction Awards.

According to Litchfield, Hessman’s Necklace began as a short story in 2016, which he expanded into a novelette that was accepted for publication, but he withdrew it in order to further expand it into a novel. He has cited the influence of Dashiell Hammett, John D. MacDonald, and F. Scott Fitzgerald on the novel's stylized prose and character-driven dialogue, aiming to balance homage to classic noir with originality and literary flair, while maintaining a brisk, suspenseful tone. The book has been included in a curated list of “Best Mystery & Crime Books” for 2025. Both Hessman’s Necklace and When the Actor Inspired Chaos and Bloodshed received the Literary Titan Gold Book Award in the Fiction category, recognizing notable works as selected by the Literary Titan book review website.

== Interviews ==
Litchfield has interviewed many authors, including Don Winslow, Jay Parini, Jim Daniels, James Reasoner, Sheldon Russell, Franz Wisner, James R. Benn, Abby Frucht, Mark Jacobs, Dietrich Kalteis, and Matthew P. Mayo.

== Bibliography ==
=== Novels ===
- Hessman’s Necklace (2025)
- When The Actor Inspired Chaos and Bloodshed (2025)
- Swampjack Virus (2013)

=== Anthologies edited ===
- Unfamiliar Territory (2025)
- A Place To Pause (2024)
- An Adventurous Spirit (2022)
- The Vicarious Traveler (2019)
- Steadfast Trekkers (2018)
- Invigorating Passages (2018)
- Grand Departures (2016)
- Other Places (2015)
- Somewhere, Sometime… (2014)
- Intrepid Travelers (2013)
- Far-flung and Foreign (2012)
- Lowestoft Chronicle 2011 Anthology (2011)
