= Matari =

First edition (publ. Hart-Davis, MacGibbon)

Matari (or reissued as White Wind, Black Rider) is a book written by Luke Rhinehart, a pen name of George Cockcroft. Matari was published in the UK in 1975, and is currently out-of-print. It was published in the US under the name of White Wind, Black Rider (2002).

== Plot summary ==
The story is set in 18th century Japan, and features a conflict between four very different characters - Oboko (nb, Ōbaku is a form of Zen), a poet of the wind and Buddhist monk; Izzi, court poet and extrovert; Lord Arishi, samurai and lord of the realm; and finally Matari, beautiful, intelligent, and on the run for her life. The story might be described as a love story - all three of the men are, in their own way, in love with Matari. Yet they each have their own outlook on life, and their own sense of honour and morality. While individually we might applaud them as good men and true, the meeting of the three results in tragedy.

Oboko survives the story and is later mentioned in The Book of the Die by the same author.

The various ISBNs of the different editions are:

- ISBN 0-246-10811-8 – January 1975 (Matari, hardcover)
- ISBN 0-586-04116-8 – September 2, 1976 (Matari, paperback)
- ISBN 1-4033-4796-4 – November 27, 2002 (White Wind, Black Rider, hardcover)
- ISBN 1-4033-4795-6 – November 27, 2002 (White Wind, Black Rider, paperback)
