= Invasion (Rhinehart novel) =

2016 novel by Luke Rhinehart

- First edition
- Author: Luke Rhinehart
- Language: English
- Genre: Science fiction
- Publisher: Titan Books
- Publication date: 2016
- Publication place: United States
- Media type: Print

Invasion is the last novel written by American author George Cockcraft under the pen name Luke Rhinehart, published in 2016.

== Plot introduction ==
Aliens from a parallel universe suddenly appear to 'have fun' on the Earth. Fisherman Billy Morton lives in Greenport on Long Island with his lawyer wife Carlita and two sons Jimmy and Lucas. An alien jumps from the sea onto his fishing boat, at first he believes it to be a 'funny fish', but it is covered in short silver hair the size of a beach ball. The alien accompanies him home where his sons called it an 'FF' and they name him Louis, who begins to watch television and then uses the home computer. News of the aliens around the world reaches the FBI, who then pinpoints Billy's house as being the source of hacking the government and corporations, stealing money from banks to give to others, making the world a fairer place. Louie and his accomplices try and change the economic and military systems but he American government soon decides that the aliens are terrorists and go on the offensive to stop them...

== Reception ==
- David Barnett in The Independent praises the novel, Invasion is not The Dice Man, and nor does it try or even want to be. However, it does share some themes of subversive humour and anarchic invention, In Rhinehart’s hands this is a terrific satire poking fun at politicians, the banks, the military and the gun-toting right, and is probably the best and funniest sci-fi satire you’ll read all year... at least until Donald Trump’s in the White House.'.
- James Lovegrove in the Financial Times writes 'Rhinehart’s 1971 novel The Dice Man is considered a counterculture classic, and the flip, zany humour of Invasion feels like a throwback to an era when widescale change seemed truly possible. The novel’s sneerily satirical tone can at times be off-putting, but amid all the hectoring and the curmudgeonly contrarianism there is a strong streak of moral indignation that few could fail to sympathise with.

== Sequel ==
Luke Rhinehart promised a sequel entitled The Hairy Balls and the End of Civilization, consisting 'of both hundreds of Protean definitions showing the real meaning of our most important words, and also Protean Proverbs, essays, Adages Revisited, and numerous witty and satirical illustrations, art works, and cartoons' told from the invaders perspective.
