= The Dice Man =

1971 English-language book by George Cockcroft

- First edition cover (US)
- Author: George Cockroft, writing as Luke Rhinehart
- Language: English
- Publisher: William Morrow (US); Talmy Franklin (UK)
- Publication date: 1971
- Publication place: United States
- Media type: Print (hardback & paperback)
- Pages: 305 pp.
- ISBN: 0-68-801457-7
- OCLC: 59367330
- Followed by: The Search for the Dice Man

The Dice Man is a 1971 novel by American novelist Luke Rhinehart a pen name for George Cockcroft.

== Synopsis ==
The book tells the story of a psychiatrist who makes daily decisions based on the casting of a die. Cockcroft describes the origin of the title idea variously in interviews, once recalling a college "quirk" he and friends used to decide "what they were going to do that night" based on a die-roll, or sometimes to decide between mildly mischievous pranks.

== Publishing history ==
At the time of its publication, "[i]t was not clear whether the book was fiction or autobiography", all the more because the protagonist and the alleged author were eponymous. Both were described as having the same profession (psychiatry), and elements of the described lives of both (e.g., places of residence, date of birth) were also in common, hence, curiosity over its authorship have persisted since its publication.

- ISBN 0-900735-00-7 – September 9, 1971
- ISBN 0-246-11058-9 – July, 1978
- ISBN 0-586-03765-9 – April 13, 1989
- ISBN 0-87951-864-2 – July, 1998
- ISBN 0-00-651390-5 – December 15, 1999
- ISBN 0-00-716121-2 – April 7, 2003

== Reception ==
The book was not initially successful, but gradually became considered a cult classic. Writing in 2017 for The Guardian, Tanya Gold noted that "over the course of 45 years" it was still in print, had become famous, had devoted fans, and had "sold more than 2m copies in multiple languages". It initially sold poorly in the United States, but well in Europe, particularly England, Sweden, Denmark, and Spain.

Cockroft continued the premise of the book in two other novels, Adventures of Wim (1986) and The Search for the Dice Man (1993), and in a companion title, The Book of the Die (2000), none of which achieved the commercial success of The Dice Man.

Kirkus Reviews wrote "[t]he odds are that this will be a winning combination and certainly his rowdy, seriocomic talent is splendidly displayed."

In 2019, Emmanuel Carrère, writing for The Guardian, presented a long-form expose on Cockroft and the relationship between author and legend, disclosing that he was a life-long English professor living "in an old farmhouse with a yard that slopes down to a duck pond", a husband of fifty-years, father of three, and a caregiver to a special-needs child.

== In popular culture ==
British band The Fall based the song "Dice Man" (1979) on this novel. British New Wave band Talk Talk wrote the song "Such A Shame" (1984) inspired by this novel. British musician Richard D. James used the pseudonym The Dice Man for the track "Polygon Window" (1992). Manic Street Preachers guitarist and lyricist Richey Edwards cited The Dice Man as one of his favourite novels, and the band referenced Rhinehart in the lyric to their song "Patrick Bateman". Season 4 of the Irish murder mystery TV show Harry Wild includes an episode inspired by the novel. Scottish band Phyne Thanquz paraphrased the introductory paragraph of The Dice Man on the track 'The Seedlings of Something', released by HRR Records on vinyl and CD in 2012.

== See also ==
- "Flip Decision"
- Yes Man (book)
