= Flipism =

Practice or personal philosophy in which all decisions are made by flipping a coin

Flipism, sometimes spelled "flippism", is a personal philosophy under which decisions are made by flipping a coin. It originally appeared in the Donald Duck Disney comic "Flip Decision" by Carl Barks, published in 1953. Barks called a practitioner of "flipism" a "flippist".

An actual coin is not necessary: dice or another random generator may be used for decision making.

Flipism can be seen as a normative decision theory, although it does not fulfill the criteria of rationality.

== History ==
In the original 1952 comic book, Donald Duck meets the eccentric Professor Batty, who persuades Donald to make decisions based on flipping a coin at every crossroad of life: "Life is but a gamble! Let flipism chart your ramble!" Donald soon gets into trouble when following this advice. He drives a one way road in the wrong direction and is fined $50. The reason for the fine is not his bad driving, but rather the fact that he relied on a coin to do his thinking instead of deciding for himself.

== In decision-making ==
Flipism is a normative decision theory in a sense that it prescribes how decisions should be made. In the comic, flipism shows remarkable ability to make right conclusions without any information—but only once in a while. In reality, flipping a coin would only lead to random decisions. However, there is an article about benefits of some randomness in the decision-making process in certain conditions. It notes:

Though the author himself may have intended this as a rejection of the idea that rationality (in the standard sense) has some special claim to superiority as a basis for making decisions, what he may really have discovered are the potential benefits of strategic commitment to randomization.

Commitment to a non-trivial mixed strategy can be beneficial for the informed party in a potential conflict under asymmetric information, as it allows the player to manipulate an opponent’s beliefs in an optimal fashion. Such a strategy also makes the player less inclined to enter into conflict when it is avoidable.

Another way of seeing the utility of flipism in decision-making can be called "revealed preferences". In the traditional form, revealed preferences mean that the preferences of consumers can be revealed by their purchasing habits. With flipism, the preferences can be revealed to the decision-maker themselves. Decisions with conflicting preferences are especially difficult even in situations where there is only one decision-maker and no uncertainty. The decision options may be either all appealing or all unpleasant, and therefore the decision-maker is unable to choose. Flipism, i.e., flipping a coin can be used to find a solution. However, the decision-maker should not decide based on the coin but instead observe their own feelings about the outcome; whether it was relieving or agonizing. In this way, flipism removes the mental block related to the act of decision-making, and the post-decision preferences can be revealed before the decision is actually made. An example of revealed preferences is embodied in the Old Testament story, the "Judgment of Solomon", wherein King Solomon offered to resolve a child custody dispute by ordering the baby cut in two, and upon seeing the reactions made an award.

Still a third approach is to look at flipism as the endpoint of a continuum bounded on the other side by perfectly rational decision-making. Flipism requires the minimum possible cognitive overhead to make decisions, at the price of making sub-optimal choices. Truly rational decision-making requires a tremendous investment in information and cognition to arrive at an optimal decision. However, the expected marginal value of information gathered (discounted for risk and uncertainty) is often lower than the marginal cost of the information or processing itself. The concept of bounded rationality posits that people employ cognitive parsimony, gathering only what they expect to be sufficient information to arrive at a satisficing (or "good enough") solution. Flipism is therefore a rational strategy to employ when the cost of information is very high relative to its expected value, and using it is an example of motivated tactical thinking.

This is a commonly recognized decision making technique used in everyday life. Other similar methods include:

- Coin flipping, cutting a deck of playing cards, finding a quotation in a holy book, consulting a Magic 8 Ball, or rolling a die.
- Accepting the first option that seems like it might achieve the desired result (known as "satisficing"), given the marginal effort involved in trying to process the information and optimize the result.
- Astrology, augury, fortune cookies, prayer, tarot cards, revelation, methods of divination or other forms of divination or oracular devices.
- The "highest paid person's opinion" (HiPPO).

These forms are in contradistinction to analytics, a commonly used method of data-based decision making.

According to Kevin Durand and Mary Leigh, flipism is "a psychological tool, and not an agent of fate". It is neither a revelation of the wishes of the head of state (e.g., Julius Caesar, whose head was on the coin, ergo, heads showed "Caesar's will") nor the divination of a deity's will.

There are those who view the resort to flipism to be a disavowal of responsibility for making personal and societal decisions based upon rationality. However, in the end, flipism shows surprising efficiency in guiding some decisions.

== Similar concepts ==
In game theory, negotiations, nuclear deterrence, diplomacy and other conflict theories—rationality, realpolitik or realism can themselves limit strategies and results. They can limit the ability of a player to make demands or get its own way through bluffing, bullying, instilling fear, causing apprehension, or psychologically manipulation or sending a heeded warning — and therefore can increase the likelihood that an opposing party may engage in objectionable or unwelcome behavior. If one knows the lines and can predict the response, then predictability and proportionality become a restraint, not a virtue. Consequently, "taunting a junkyard dog (Note: An aggressive dog that guards a scrap yard or junkyard) is OK, if you know you are beyond the reach of its tether." Thus irrationality (real or perceived) can be an important countervailing tool or strategy, particularly as a deterrent and if it engenders hesitation, fear, negotiation and resolution, or change of course. However, alternate strategies such as honesty, building a climate of trust, respect, using intermediaries, mediation or other forms of conflict resolution, sanctions, patience, process, data and reasoning might still be available, as might strategies like so-called win-win bargaining (also called "interest-based" bargaining) – which tries to reach an accord based on interests, not necessarily on positions, power, rights or distribution. Another approach is Cooperative bargaining and gain sharing.

== See also ==
- Applications of randomness – Uses of an apparent lack of pattern or predictability in events
- Coin flipping – Practice of throwing a coin in the air to choose between two alternatives
- Donaldism – Disney comics fandom – Fandom movement for Disney comics
- Magic 8 Ball – Plastic sphere used for fortune-telling
- Nash equilibrium – Solution concept of a non-cooperative game
- PP (complexity) – Class of problems in computer science
- Ukehi – Ancient Japanese ritual using a random outcome to divine a path of action

== Notes ==
Notes
