= Uganda Poetry Society =

- Abbreviation: UPS
- Formation: 2024
- Type: Literary organization
- Headquarters: Kampala, Uganda
- Website: https://ugandapoetrysociety.org

The Uganda Poetry Society (UPS) is a Ugandan literary organization that is committed to promoting poetry in Uganda and abroad. The society does this through joint workshops and partnerships.

== Leadership ==
The society has an organizational structure. The patron is Prof. Timothy Wangusa, a Ugandan poet and former cabinet minister.

== Programs and activities ==
The society participates in events, such as visiting poets, and creative writing sessions, including book reviews.

== Partnerships ==
In early 2026, the society partnered with Kampala Film School.

== Award ==
In late 2025, the society founded the Dr. Ivan Edwards Poetry Award, an annual $1200 award, to promote poetry in Uganda and beyond.

The first award ceremony occurred on March 28 2026 in Kampala.

The top awardee, in spoken word category, was Atim Priscilla Ariance.
