= Julia Zolotova =

Russian-British fiction writer

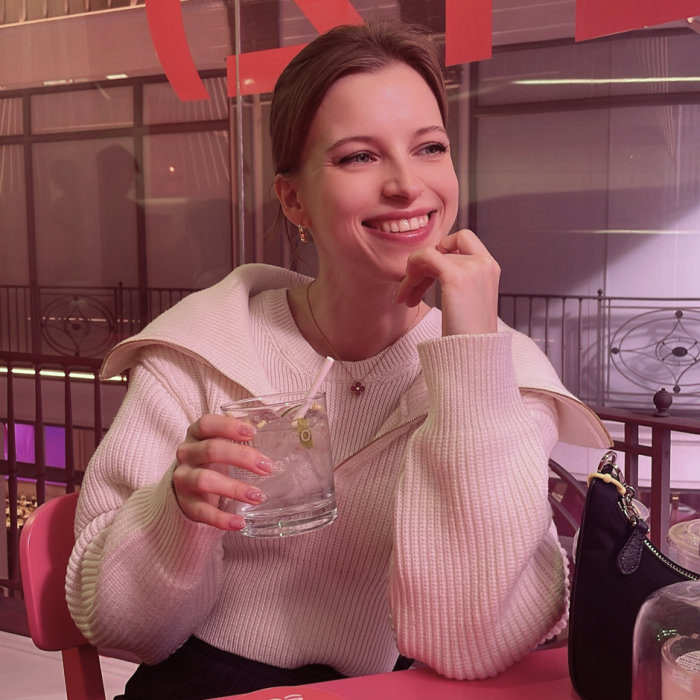
- Born: Russia
- Education: Regent's University London; Coventry University London; Glasgow Caledonian University London
- Occupation: Writer
- Writing career
- Language: English, Russian
- Notable works: Eastern Empire, The Influencer's Canvas
- Notable awards: Creativitys.UK Award (2024); Stein Arts Award (2024); Finalist, Galakonkurs (2025)
- Website: juliazolotovawriter.com

Julia Zolotova is a Russian contemporary fiction writer based in London. She is the author of several novels and short story collections addressing topics such as cross-cultural identity, digital environments, and the intersection of art and commerce. Her works have been published internationally and have received recognition from literary awards.

== Early life and education ==
Zolotova was born in Russia and resides in London, United Kingdom. She earned a BA in International Business with Chinese from Regent's University London, an MSc in Enterprise and Innovation from Coventry University London, and an MBA in Luxury Brand Management from Glasgow Caledonian University London.

== Career ==
=== Publications ===
Zolotova's literary debut came with Temporary Access (December 2021), a collection exploring border crossing and provisional identity in the digital age during pandemic lockdowns.

Her first novel, Polished Edges (2022), focuses on themes of migration and identity. The character X, an elite nail artist, first appears in this novel.

Subsequent works include Luxury Labyrinth (2023), examining cultural dislocation in the luxury sector, and Omnichannel Hearts (2024), which explores relationships across digital and physical boundaries.

Her 2023 novel Eastern Empire has been the subject of critical discussion in literary magazines. The novel tells the story of Marina from Russia and Li Jing from China, who meet as students in Beijing and later co-found an art-tech company called Aurora, navigating their shared vision across Moscow, Shanghai and London. The book explores how ideals change when they become part of global organizational systems, incorporating themes of cultural conflict and personal ambition. The Creativitys.UK Award jury praised her "mastery in weaving compelling human drama from the grand sweep of historical events and intricate political machinations."

In 2025 Zolotova published The Influencer's Canvas, a novel set in the environment of digital media and celebrity culture. The book follows X, an elite nail artist from London who is invited to an exclusive Maldives retreat for elite creators, where she documents their hidden lives. The book is available via several international platforms, including Waterstones, Hatchards, Amazon UK, and Kotlyarov Publishers.

=== Literary events ===
- In June 2024 Zolotova presented Omnichannel Hearts to Russian readers in Moscow.
- In July 2025 she hosted a literary evening at Shoreditch Sky Lounge in London ahead of her UK book launch.
- In September 2025 Zolotova held a public discussion at Fulham Library in London, exploring themes of self-presentation and authenticity in modern life. The event was covered by London-based media outlets and highlighted her reflections on how "Londoners perform constantly — even when alone.”

== Awards and recognition ==
Zolotova received the Creativitys UK Award in July 2024 for her novel Eastern Empire. She has also been recognized with the Stein Arts Award (July 2024). In April 2025 her novel Eastern Empire was selected as a finalist in the Galakonkurs Literary Competition.

== Bibliography ==
=== Novels and collections ===
- Temporary Access (2021)
- Polished Edges (2022)
- Luxury Labyrinth (2023)
- Eastern Empire (2023)
- Omnichannel Hearts (2024)
- The Influencer's Canvas (2025)
