= Snapping: America's Epidemic of Sudden Personality Change =

1978 book by Flo Conway and Jim Siegelman

- First edition
- Author: Flo Conway; Jim Siegelman
- Language: English
- Subject: Religious conversion, Mind control
- Publisher: 1st ed. Lippincott, 2nd printing Dell, 2nd ed. Stillpoint Press
- Publication date: 1978 ( 2005 )
- Publication place: United States
- Media type: Paperback
- Pages: 380 ( 365 )
- ISBN: 0-397-01258-6 (1st ed.); ISBN 0-440-57970-8 (2nd printing); ISBN 0-9647650-0-4 (2nd ed.)
- Dewey Decimal: 155.2/5
- LC Class: BF698.2 .C66

Snapping: America's Epidemic of Sudden Personality Change is a 1978 book written by Flo Conway and Jim Siegelman which describes the authors' theory of religious conversion. They propose that "snapping" is a mental process through which a person is recruited by a cult or new religious movement, or leaves the group through deprogramming or exit counseling. Political ideological conversions are also included, with Patty Hearst given as an example.

Two editions of the book were published, the first (1978) by Lippincott Williams & Wilkins and reprinted in 1979 by Dell Publishing. A second edition (1995) was printed by Stillpoint Press, a publishing company owned by the authors.

Conway and Siegelman wrote an article in Playboy and Science Digest in 1979 and 1982 respectively to advertise and discuss their book and findings.

== Concept ==
Conway and Siegelman describe snapping as:

an experience that is unmistakably traumatic ... Sudden change comes in a moment of intense experience that is not so much a peak as a precipice, an unforeseen break in the continuity of awareness that may leave them detached, withdrawn, disoriented – and utterly confused.

Snapping has been said to create the effect of an entirely new person, often completely different and unrecognizable.

Conway and Siegelman further proposed that a disorder which they named "information disease" was caused by alteration of the neurological pathways of the brain by group indoctrination and mind control activities.

== Scholarly reception ==
Michael Rogers, in Library Journal, writes that the work is important for public and academic libraries. Reverend Mark L. Middleton, though noting that he does not fully endorse the views of the book, writes that it is an important contribution to religious and mental health literature.

Brock Kilbourne, a social psychologist, criticized the methodology and analysis in the book and accompanying articles. He argues, through analysis of Conway and Siegelman's data, that there was "no support" for their conclusions, and in some cases the data showed the opposite of what they argued (i.e. cult participation might have positive benefits). In a response, Michael D. Langone and Brendan A. Maher argued that Kilbourne's statistical analysis is flawed and that no conclusions can be made, though they concede that Conway and Siegelman have a lack of statistical analysis of their data. In a rejoinder, Kilbourne reasserted his findings. In the Journal for the Scientific Study of Religion, Lee Kirkpatrick pointed out that Kilbourne made numerous statistical errors and inappropriate choices of measures of correlation. Not only were Kilbourne's findings inaccurate, but when appropriate statistical methods were applied it shows the direct opposite of Kilbourne's claims. Conway and Siegelman had slightly understated the negative effects of cult membership on psychological wellbeing; its effects are worse than their original findings. Religion scholars James R. Lewis and David G. Bromley argue that there are significant methodological problems in research including anti-cult or anti-religious bias, predominance of deprogrammed individuals in the sample, and the fact that some of the people in the sample were receiving therapy while in the clinical trial.
