= Adventures of Wim =

1986 novel by George Cockcroft

Adventures of Whim
- First edition (UK)
- Author: Luke Rhinehart
- Language: English
- Genre: Comedy, Philosophical novel
- Publisher: Grafton Books (UK) & AuthorHouse (USA)
- Publication date: 22 May 1986 (UK as "Adventures ..."; 27 November 2002 (USA as "Whim")
- Publication place: United States
- Media type: Print (hardback & paperback)
- Pages: 320 pp (hardback edition) (orig UK) & 452 p. (hardback edition) (USA revised)
- ISBN: 0-246-12769-4 (hardback edition) (orig UK) & ISBN 1-4033-4799-9 (hardback edition) (USA revised)
- OCLC: 13124910

Adventures of Wim is a book by George Cockcroft, written under the pen name Luke Rhinehart. It was first published in 1986.

== Plot summary ==
The book is composed of sections taken from other, fictional books. The preface to the book claims that it was written in Deya, Majorca, in 2326. According to the book, an entire industry has grown up publishing books about a Montauk named Wim - including The Gospel According to Luke (Luke Froth, not Luke Rhinehart) and the screenplay of a movie. The screenplay is possibly in there as a result of Luke Rhinehart's continuing frustration in trying to get The Dice Man turned into a good movie. Adventures of Wim, then, is an effort to create a new interpretation of the story of Wim, drawing on the many previous efforts, and so providing a multi-faceted and whimsical account of 'one of the greatest figures in the 20th and 21st Century'.

A boy is born of a virgin mother and is named "Wim" (in Adventures of Wim) or "Whim" (in The Book of the Die and Whim): Montauk for "Wave Rider". He is pronounced to be the saviour of the Montauk nation by his tribe's navigator (official historian and spiritual guide), and educated in their ways including the "Montauk martial arts" which are predicated on not engaging with, nor even being noticed by an enemy. Sadly, social services force Wim to attend school, where they attempt to educate him in more useful skills, such as American football. Wim, also known as "He of Many Chances", proves to be an inefficient saviour, as God sends him on a quest for Ultimate Truth. This does not seem to be something that will benefit his tribe terribly, but the navigator isn't one to stare down the barrel of a lightning gun, and sends him on his way. After a long and arduous search, Wim finds ultimate truth (in a potato), and with it the cure for the sickness of the human condition.

== Release details ==
- 1986, UK, Grafton Books ISBN 0-246-12769-4, Pub date 22 May 1986, hardcover (as Adventures of Wim)
- 1987, UK, Grafton Books ISBN 0-586-06752-3, Pub date 19 November 1987, paperback (as Adventures of Wim)
- 2002, USA, AuthorHouse ISBN 1-4033-4799-9, Pub date 2002, hardcover (as Whim)
- 2002, USA, AuthorHouse ISBN 1-4033-4798-0, Pub date 2002, paperback (as Whim)
