= Lancashire Post =

English regional newspaper

- Type: Daily newspaper
- Format: Tabloid
- Owner: National World
- Founded: 1886
- Headquarters: Oliver's Place, Fulwood, Preston
- Circulation: 3,114 (as of 2023)
- ISSN: 0964-0967
- Website: lep.co.uk

The Lancashire Post is a daily newspaper based in Fulwood, a suburb of the city of Preston, Lancashire, England. Until 14 January 2017 it was known as the Lancashire Evening Post. According to the British Library, its first edition was published on 18 October 1886. It is known locally as the LEP. The editor is Nicola Adam, who also holds the title Editor in chief North West for Iconic Media (formerly National World).
