= Luke Rhinehart =

American writer (1932–2020)

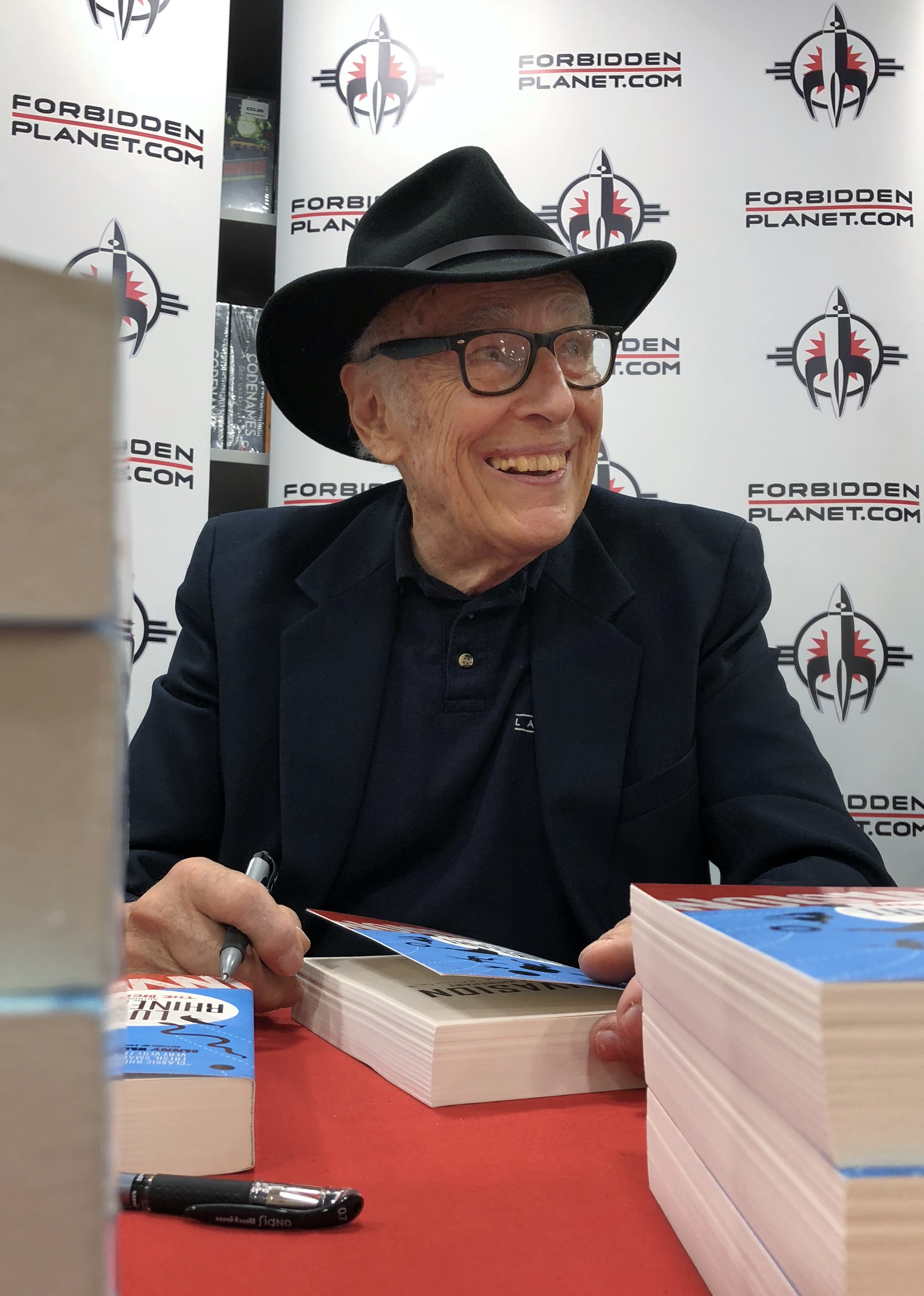
- Luke Rhinehart signing copies of Invasion in 2016.
- Born: George Powers Cockcroft; November 15, 1932; Albany, New York, U.S.
- Died: November 6, 2020 (aged 87); Canaan, New York, U.S.
- Occupation: Writer
- Writing career
- Genre: Humor
- Notable works: The Dice Man (1971); Adventures of Wim (1986); The Search for the Dice Man (1993)

George Powers Cockcroft (November 15, 1932 – November 6, 2020), widely known by the pen name Luke Rhinehart, was an American novelist, screenwriter, and nonfiction writer. He is best known for his 1971 novel The Dice Man, the story of a psychiatrist who experiments with making life decisions based on the roll of a dice.

The Dice Man was critically well received and a commercial success. It quickly became and remains a cult classic. It was followed by two spiritual sequels in Adventures of Wim (1986) and The Search for the Dice Man (1993) as well as a companion volume called The Book of the Die (2000). Rhinehart wrote several other novels between 1986 and 2016, though none achieved the success of The Dice Man.

== Biography ==
=== Early life ===
George Powers Cockcroft was born on November 15, 1932, in Albany, New York, to Donald and Elizabeth Cockcroft, both college graduates, his mother from Wellesley College. He was raised in Albany, where his father was an electrical engineer, and his ancestry included Vermont political notables. He attended The Albany Academy, graduating in 1950, and received a BA from Cornell University in 1954 and an MA from Columbia University in 1956. In 1964, he received a PhD in American literature from Columbia. After obtaining his PhD, he went into teaching. During his years as a university professor he taught, among other things, courses in Zen and Western literature.

In 1969, while Cockcroft was teaching a study abroad program on the island of Mallorca, an Englishman starting a new publishing house stopped at a cafe in the same village, Deià, and was given a partial manuscript of The Dice Man to read by Cockcroft. Cockcroft was subsequently offered an advance payment for publication. Shortly afterwards, Cockcroft was encouraged by his course Director to take an early sabbatical from his teaching duties. He remained in Mallorca to complete the novel, after which the publisher sold the American rights to the novel for a large sum, and within a year the film rights, allowing Cockcroft to retire from teaching and become a full time novelist.

=== Personal life and family ===
Cockcroft married his wife, Ann, who later became a writer of two romance novels and a volume of poetry, in June 1956. Together they have three children.

The author and his family spent a number of years traveling, sailing, and returning to Mallorca, living in Deià in the late 1960s and early 70s, including time spent on a large catamaran, which became the inspiration for the boat in his novel Long Voyage Back. In the mid-1970s they returned to the United States. They spent 1975 in a sufi commune, before moving to a large old farmhouse and former religious retreat in the foothills of the Berkshires in upstate New York.

=== Later life and death ===
I am old now. Illusions are losing their grip. They are dropping off me like leaves from an autumn tree. How nice.

— Luke Rhinehart.

On 1 August 2012, the "death" of Rhinehart at the age of 79 was announced by email to 25 friends, beginning with the words "It is our pleasure to inform you that Luke Rhinehart is dead"; it was later revealed the "Death Letter" was instigated as a playful hoax by Cockcroft. Reactions ranged from sorrow to gratitude and amusement.

In 2018, Rhinehart expressed a wish to be cremated after his death if he could not be naturally buried legally in the one-acre lake upon his property.

George Cockroft died, aged 87, on 6 November 2020.

== The Dice Man ==
Rhinehart's famous novel The Dice Man was published in 1971 and tells the story of a psychiatrist who makes daily decisions based on the casting of dice. The cover bore the confident tagline, "Few novels can change your life. This one will"; in the United States this was altered to read, "This book will change your life".

Cockcroft has described the origin of the idea for this work variously, and at the time of the publication of this work, "it was not clear whether the book was fiction or autobiography", because its protagonist and author were eponymous. Curiosity over its authorship has persisted since its publication.

Emmanuel Carrère, writing for The Guardian, presented a long-form expose on Cockcroft and the relationship between author and legend in 2019, and in following others, established the author Cockcroft as a life-long English professor living "in an old farmhouse with a yard that slopes down to a duck pond", a husband of fifty-years, father of three, and a caregiver to a special needs child.

The Dice Man was critically well received. It quickly became, and remains thought of as a cult classic. It initially sold poorly in the United States, but well in Europe, particularly England, Sweden, Denmark, and Spain. Writing in 2017 for The Guardian, Tanya Gold noted that "over the course of 45 years" it was still in print, had become famous, had devoted fans, and had "sold more than 2m copies in multiple languages", with as many as 27 languages and 60 countries have been claimed.

In 1995, the BBC called it "one of the fifty most influential books of the last half of the twentieth century,". In 1999, after one of their reporters experimented, controversially, with dicing, Loaded magazine named it "Novel of the Century". In 2013, Alex Clark of the Telegraph chose it as one of the fifty greatest cult books of the last hundred years.

== Works after The Dice Man ==
=== Comic philosophical novels ===
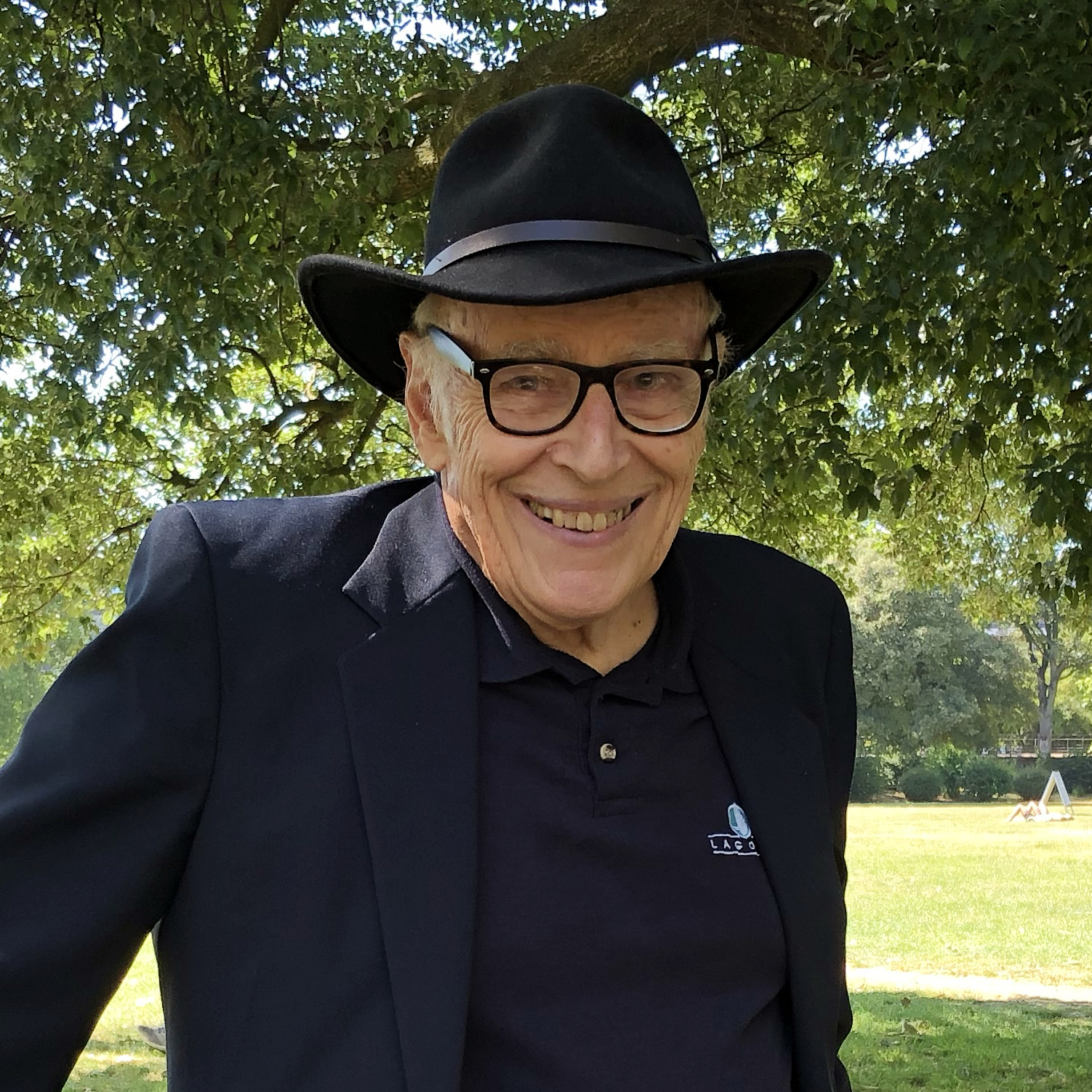
Luke Rhinehart in 2018.

A number of works by Luke Rhinehart have a similar style and themes to The Dice Man, alternating between first- and third-person voices with selections from fictional documents. In one case, he even quotes from a future book that he did not actually write until more than two decades later. The voices having different characteristics, the novel's mood changes accordingly.

Presenting these multiple fragments from multiple viewpoints together results in a "cubist" narrative structure. Of this, Rhinehart stated that they had "always conceived of myself as being multiple – having, you know, a dozen different selves, if not a thousand different selves, at any given moment."

Adventures of Wim is a new interpretation of the story of Wim, a Montauk boy born of a virgin mother, declared the savior of the Montauk nation, and his life quest for Ultimate Truth. The story is told in part through the medium of fictional documents.

The Search for the Dice Man (1993), set twenty years after The Dice Man, tells the story of Luke Rhinehart's son, Larry, who has built a highly successful and stable life after rejecting his father's embracing of Chance. On a quest to find his father, Larry's life of order and routine is enveloped in chaos, the legacy of his father's work.

From a draft written at the same time as The Dice Man, Naked Before the World (2008) celebrates the lives of both hippies and the establishment in 1960s Mallorca through the story of Katya, a naive Catholic art student who arrives on the island to study. Katya is thrown into a world of artists, frauds, sex, drugs and the struggle to discover who she wants to be.

In Jesus Invades George: An Alternative History (2013), which takes place in 2007, then-sitting President George W. Bush is possessed by the spirit of Jesus Christ. The story playfully reveals and deconstructs the hypocrisy of government and modern politics.

In Invasion (2016), aliens invade Earth for the sole purpose of having fun. Hyper-intelligent and able to morph into multiple forms, they play games with culture and infrastructure, from computer networks and social media to corporate culture and human relationships. The resulting mayhem reveals the primitive nature of our society, and offers an alternative vision for the human race. A sequel is yet to be published, entitled The Hairy Balls and the End of Civilization.

=== Conventional novels ===
Matari (1975), republished as White Wind, Black Rider (2008), is historical fiction set in 18th Century Japan. The beautiful Matari is joined by two zen poets as she flees from her husband, a samurai lord who is giving chase with intent to murder her. A lyrical and poetic tale of love, honor and morality.

Long Voyage Back (1983) is a nautical action-adventure novel following a group of people sailing a trimaran, and their struggle for survival as they escape the aftermath of nuclear war.

=== Nonfiction ===
The Book of est (1976) is a narrative account of Werner Erhard's controversial large-group awareness training personal transformation course, Erhard Seminars Training, which began in 1971. The reader is put in the place of a participant in order to vicariously "experience" the training. Erhard wrote a foreword to the book.

The Book of the Die (2000) is "handbook of dice living" intended to help readers to embrace Chance and live more freely. It follows the philosophy that people must give up their illusion that a self-direction can control life; they must let go. A collection of proverbs, essays, cartoons, poems and scenes from movies form this guide to creating a more playful and unpredictable life.

=== Other work ===
Rhinehart wrote nine screenplays: five were based directly on his novels: The Dice Man, The Search for the Dice Man, Whim, Naked Before the World, and White Wind, Black Rider. Two others were direct Dice Man sequels featuring the original character: The Dice Lady (co-written with Peter Forbes), and Last Roll of the Die (co-written with Nick Mead). Two other screenplays, Mawson and Picton's Chance were original concepts.

A music and spoken word album, The Dice Man Speaks featuring the pseudonymous Rhinehart and Sputnik Weazel was released in 2018. On it, Luke Rhinehart performs spoken word passages over acoustic and electronic music by Weazel.

== Cultural influence ==
Richard Branson has said he used dice when signing bands in the early days of Virgin Records after reading The Dice Man and deciding to "follow its teachings."

Journalist Ben Marshall spent two years from 1998 to 2000 experimenting with dice and reporting his experiences in Loaded magazine; Loaded subsequently named Cockcroft/Rhinehart as novelist of the century.

A four-season television travel series called The Diceman was broadcast between 1998 and 2000 by the Discovery Channel in which the destinations and activities of the participants were determined by the roll of a die.

UK Channel 4's broadcast of Diceworld (1999, Paul Wilmshurst directing), a 50-minute television documentary about Cockcroft/Rhinehart and some of the people influenced by his novels contributed to a resurgence of interest in Cockcroft/Rhinehart's books. A further documentary was produced in 2004, a collaboration between Cockcroft/Rhinehart and director Nick Mead, entitled Dice Life: The Random Mind of Luke Rhinehart.

Inspired by The Dice Man and written by Paul Lucas, a play called The Dice House premiered in the United Kingdom in 2001, and went on to staging at the Arts Theatre in London's West End in 2004. The text of Lucas's play was published by Faber & Faber in 2001 and by Bloomsbury in 2012.

In music, a 1979 song by The Fall called "Dice Man" takes its title and general concept from the book. The Talk Talk song "Such A Shame" (1984) was inspired by The Dice Man. In 1992 British musician Richard D. James used the pseudonym The Dice Man for the track "Polygon Window". Jez Coad's band The Surfing Brides have a track titled "Diceman" (1992) which was also inspired by the book. The At The Gates song "World of Lies" (1995) quotes The Dice Man during its spoken word lyrics.

The UK comic, 2000 AD, published the Gamebook magazine Dice Man in 1986. Five editions were created by Pat Mills through October of that year, with script and game by Mills, covers by Glenn Fabry, and art and lettering by various 2000 AD artists.

The brewers of Rolling Rock beer launched an advertising campaign in the United Kingdom in 1998 based on The Dice Man, a campaign that included a short-lived Dice Life website.

== Bibliography ==
- The Dice Man (1971)
- Matari (1975)
- The Book of est (1976)
- Long Voyage Back (1983)
- Adventures of Wim (1986)
- The Search for the Dice Man (1993)
- The Book of the Die (2000)
- Whim (2002 reissue of Adventures of Wim)
- White Wind, Black Rider (2008). Reissue of Matari
- Naked Before the World: A Lovely Pornographic Love Story (2008)
- Jesus Invades George: An Alternative History (2013)
- Invasion (2016)
- The Hairy Balls and the End of Civilization (unpublished)
