= History of economic thought =

Study of the development of economic thought

The history of economic thought is the study of the philosophies of the different thinkers and theories in the subjects that later became political economy and economics, from the ancient world to the present day.

This field encompasses many disparate schools of economic thought. Ancient Greek writers such as the philosopher Aristotle examined ideas about the art of wealth acquisition, and questioned whether property is best left in private or public hands. In the Middle Ages, Thomas Aquinas argued that it was a moral obligation of businesses to sell goods at a just price.

In the Western world, economics was not a separate discipline, but part of philosophy until the 18th–19th century Industrial Revolution and the 19th century Great Divergence, which accelerated economic growth.

== Ancient economic thought (before 500 AD) ==
=== Ancient Greece ===
Hesiod active 750 to 650 BC, a Boeotian who wrote the earliest known work concerning the basic origins of economic thought, contemporary with Homer. Of the 828 verses in his poem Works and Days, the first 383 centered on the fundamental economic problem of scarce resources for the pursuit of numerous and abundant human ends and desires.

=== China ===
Fan Li (also known as Tao Zhu Gong) (born 517 BCE), an adviser to King Goujian of Yue, wrote on economic issues and developed a set of "golden" business rules. Discourses on Salt and Iron in 81 BCE was one of the first recorded debates of state intervention and laissez faire.

=== Ancient India ===
The earliest Hindu texts contain no systematic treatment of economics, but they record economic institutions. Joseph Spengler, a historian of economic thought, finds private property, occupational specialization, price-bargaining and interest-bearing loans mentioned in the Rigveda. The later Dharmaśāstras forbid false weights and measures and set the King's tax at between one-tenth and one-sixth of farm produce, and lower for other activities: one day's work for artisans. A customary maximum interest rate was about 1.25% per month. Apart from the Rigveda, other Hindu texts, the Vedas (1700–1100 BC) contain economic ideas, with Atharvaveda (1200 BC) being the most vocal.

In early Buddhist writings, prices are set mostly by custom rather than by the state, and money mediates most trade. The Sigālovāda Sutta advises a householder to divide his wealth into four parts: one to enjoy, two to invest in business, and to save against misfortune.

The most important ancient Indian work on economic policy is the Arthashastra, a treatise on statecraft, military strategy, and the economy traditionally attributed to Chanakya (also known as Kautilya, born ~350 BC) of the Maurya Empire. Chanakya was a minister to Chandragupt Mourya in the fourth century BCE. Its authorship and date are disputed.

The Arthashastra posits that four fields of knowledge are necessary: the Vedas, the Anvikshaki (philosophy of Samkhya, Yoga, and Lokayata), the science of government, and the science of economics (Varta of agriculture, cattle, and trade). All other knowledge, wealth, and human prosperity derive from these four. The text defines the purpose of economics as acquiring what is not possessed, augmenting what is preserved, and bestowing it. Standard histories of economic thought generally begin with the Greeks; some scholars argue that Indian contributions have been largely overlooked.

=== Greco-Roman world ===
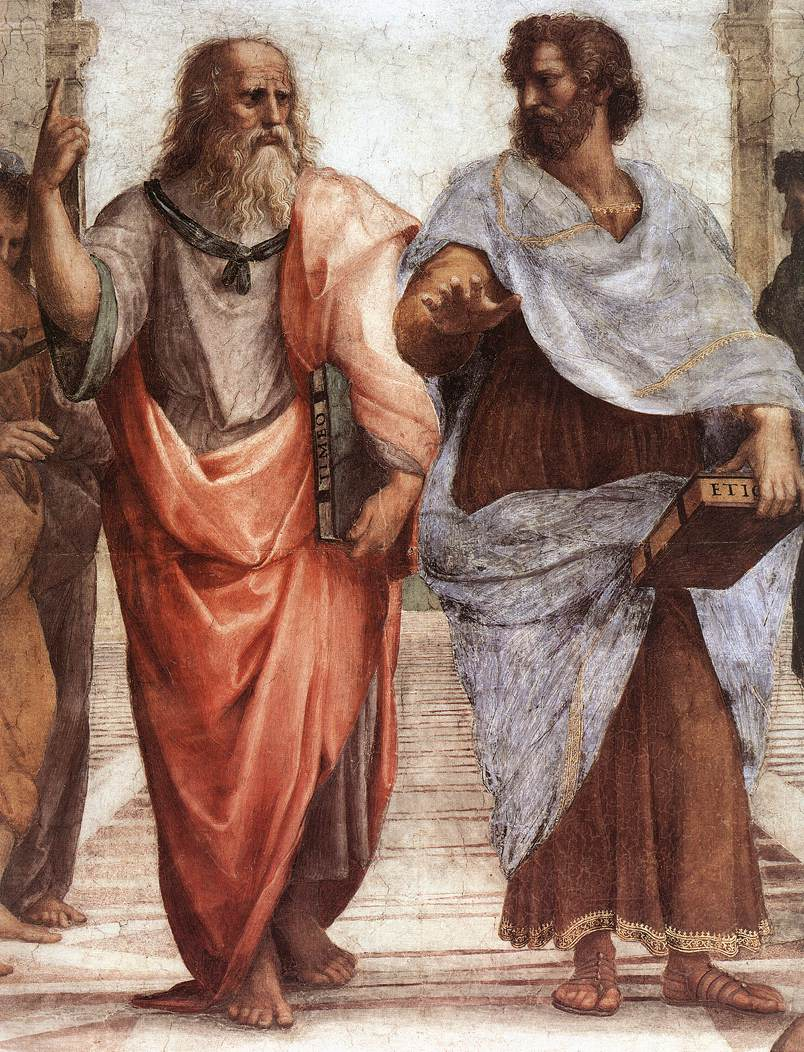
Plato and his pupil Aristotle had an enduring effect on Western philosophy.

Ancient Athens, an advanced city-state civilisation and progressive society, developed an embryonic model of democracy.

Xenophon's (c. 430–354 BC) Oeconomicus (c. 360 BC) is a dialogue principally about household management and agriculture.

Plato's dialogue The Republic (c. 380–360 BC) describing an ideal city-state run by philosopher-kings contained references to specialization of labor and to production. According to Joseph Schumpeter, Plato was the first known advocate of a credit theory of money that is, money as a unit of account for debt. Plato also argued that collective ownership was necessary to promote common pursuit of the common interest, and to avoid the social divisiveness that would occur "when some grieve exceedingly and others rejoice at the same happenings."

Aristotle's Politics (c. 350 BC) analyzed different forms of the state (monarchy, aristocracy, constitutional government, tyranny, oligarchy, and democracy) as a critique of Plato's model of rule by philosopher-kings. Of particular interest for economists, Plato provided a blueprint of a society based on common ownership of resources. Aristotle viewed this model as an oligarchical anathema. Though Aristotle did certainly advocate holding many things in common, he argued that not everything could be, simply because of the "wickedness of human nature".

"It is clearly better that property should be private", wrote Aristotle, "but the use of it common; and the special business of the legislator is to create in men this benevolent disposition." In Politics Book I, Aristotle discusses the general nature of households and market exchanges. For him there is a certain "art of acquisition" or "wealth-getting", which is necessary and honourable for one's household, while exchange on the retail trade for simply accumulation is "justly censured, for it is dishonorable". Writing of the people, Aristotle stated that they as a whole thought acquisition of wealth (chrematistike) as being either the same as, or a principle of oikonomia ("household management" – oikonomos), with oikos meaning "house" and with nomos meaning "law". Aristotle himself highly disapproved of usury and cast scorn on making money through a monopoly.

Aristotle discarded Plato's credit theory of money for metallism, the theory that money derives its value from the purchasing power of the commodity upon which it is based:

Indeed, riches is assumed by many to be only a quantity of coin, because the arts of getting wealth and retail trade are concerned with coin. Others maintain that coined money is a mere sham, a thing not natural, but conventional only, because, if the users substitute another commodity for it, it is worthless, and because it is not useful as a means to any of the necessities of life, and, indeed, he who is rich in coin may often be in want of necessary food. But how can that be wealth of which a man may have a great abundance and yet perish with hunger, like Midas in the fable, whose insatiable prayer turned everything that was set before him into gold?.

— Aristotle

== Middle Ages ==
=== Wang Anshi ===
Wang Anshi (1021–1086) was a Chinese politician and reformer, who asserted that financial management should be the main concern of the state, emphasizing the need to boost state revenue through "developing production". In his writings, Wang used Sang Hongyang as an example to show that good financial management could provide enough money for the country without raising taxes. Specifically, Wang prioritized agriculture suggesting that reducing burdens on farmers and preventing mergers would stimulate their motivation.

=== Ye Shi ===
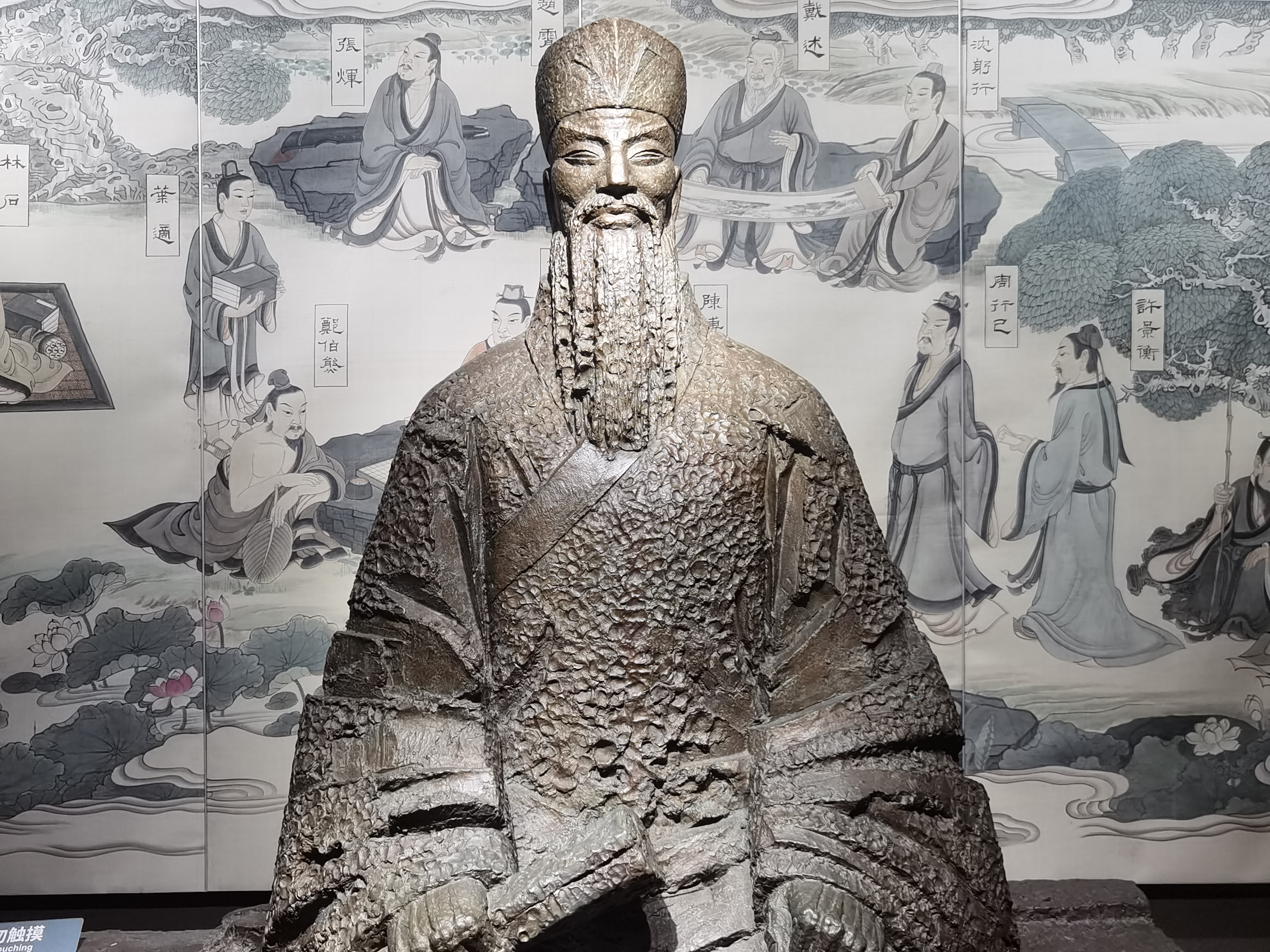
A statue of Ye Shi

Ye Shi (1150–1223) was a Chinese government official and philosopher from the Yongjia School during the Southern Song dynasty. He wrote on finances and government organization, over which his monetary expositions can be found in his texts such as Coins II, which delves with his views on the dynamics between currency and commodities.

Ye argued that money was created by merchants of trade as a medium of exchange. He described the evolution of currency in three periods. In the first period, during the three generations, money was used very little as households valued rice, cloth, vegetables, and fish more, leading to a focus on safety rather than currency. The second period saw more money use in the Qin and Han dynasties, while in the third period, during the Southern Song dynasty, money fell out of use due to the country's isolation, self-sufficiency needs, and lack of trade. Ultimately, only traders and the court relied on money's usefulness. He also questioned the imperial court's view of money as a means of storage, stating that money should be in circulation.

... the reason why money is respected from top to bottom, and its power is as heavy as it is to people of all things, is so that it can be used for the use of all things ...

— Ye Shi, Coins II

He criticized the policies of the Song dynasty in terms of fiscal policy and direct government control of industries. During the reign of Emperor Ningzong, Ye was labeled as a "heretic" scholar and, following the Southern Song dynasty's defeat in the northern expedition against the Jurchen Jin in 1207, was under suspicion as a collaborator of Counselor-in-Chief Han Tuozhou.

=== Thomas Aquinas ===
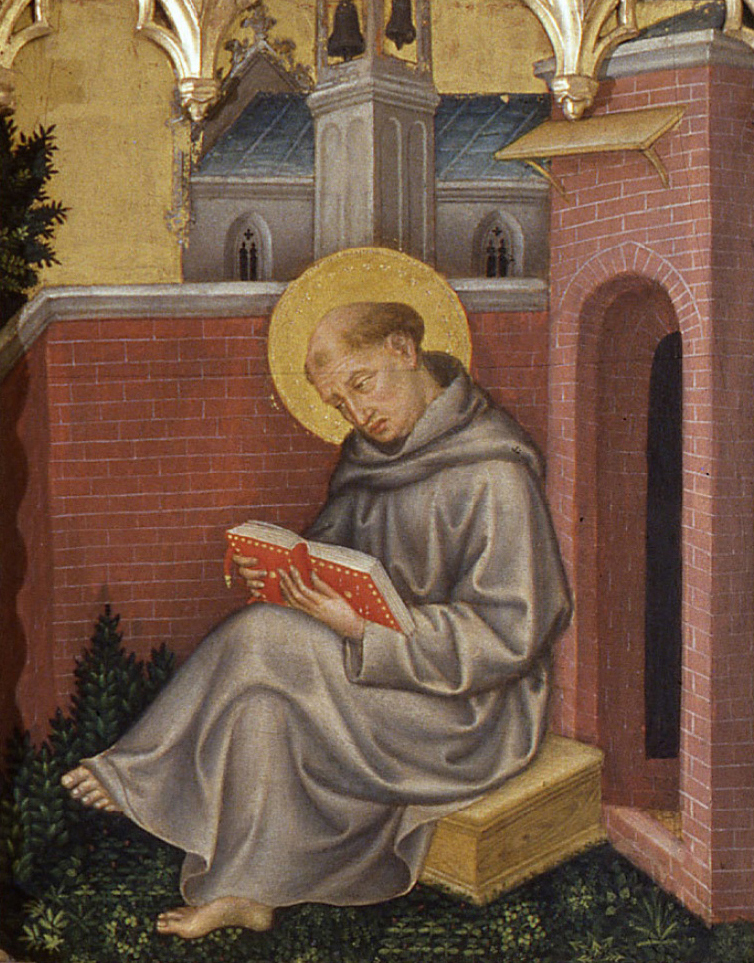
Thomas Aquinas (1225–1274) taught that high prices in response to high demand is theft.

Thomas Aquinas (1225–74) was an Italian theologian and economic writer. He taught in both Cologne and Paris, and was part of a group of Catholic scholars known as the Schoolmen, who moved their enquiries beyond theology to philosophical and scientific debates. In the treatise Summa Theologica Aquinas dealt with the concept of a just price, which he considered necessary for the reproduction of the social order. Similar in many ways to the modern concept of long-run equilibrium, a just price was just sufficient to cover the costs of production, including the maintenance of a worker and his family. Aquinas argued it was immoral for sellers to raise their prices simply because buyers had a pressing need for a product.

Aquinas discusses a number of topics in the format of questions and replies, substantial tracts dealing with Aristotle's theory. Questions 77 and 78 concern economic issues, primarily what a just price might be, and the fairness of a seller dispensing faulty goods. Aquinas argued against any form of cheating and recommended always paying compensation in lieu of service obtained as it utilized resources. Whilst human laws might not impose sanctions for unfair dealing, divine law did, in his opinion.

=== Duns Scotus ===
One of Aquinas' main critics was Duns Scotus (1265–1308), originally from Duns Scotland, who taught in Oxford, Cologne, and Paris. In his work Sententiae (1295), he thought it possible to be more precise than Aquinas in calculating a just price, emphasizing the costs of labor and expenses, although he recognized that the latter might be inflated by exaggeration, because buyer and seller usually have different ideas of a just price. If people did not benefit from a transaction, in Scotus' view, they would not trade. Scotus said merchants perform a necessary and useful social role by transporting goods and making them available to the public.

=== Jean Buridan ===
Jean Buridan (French: [byʁidɑ̃]; Latin Johannes Buridanus; c. 1300 – after 1358) was a French priest. Buridanus looked at money from two angles: its metal value and its purchasing power, which he acknowledged can vary. He argued that aggregated, not individual, demand and supply determine market prices. Hence, for him a just price was what the society collectively and not just one individual is willing to pay.

=== Ibn Khaldun ===
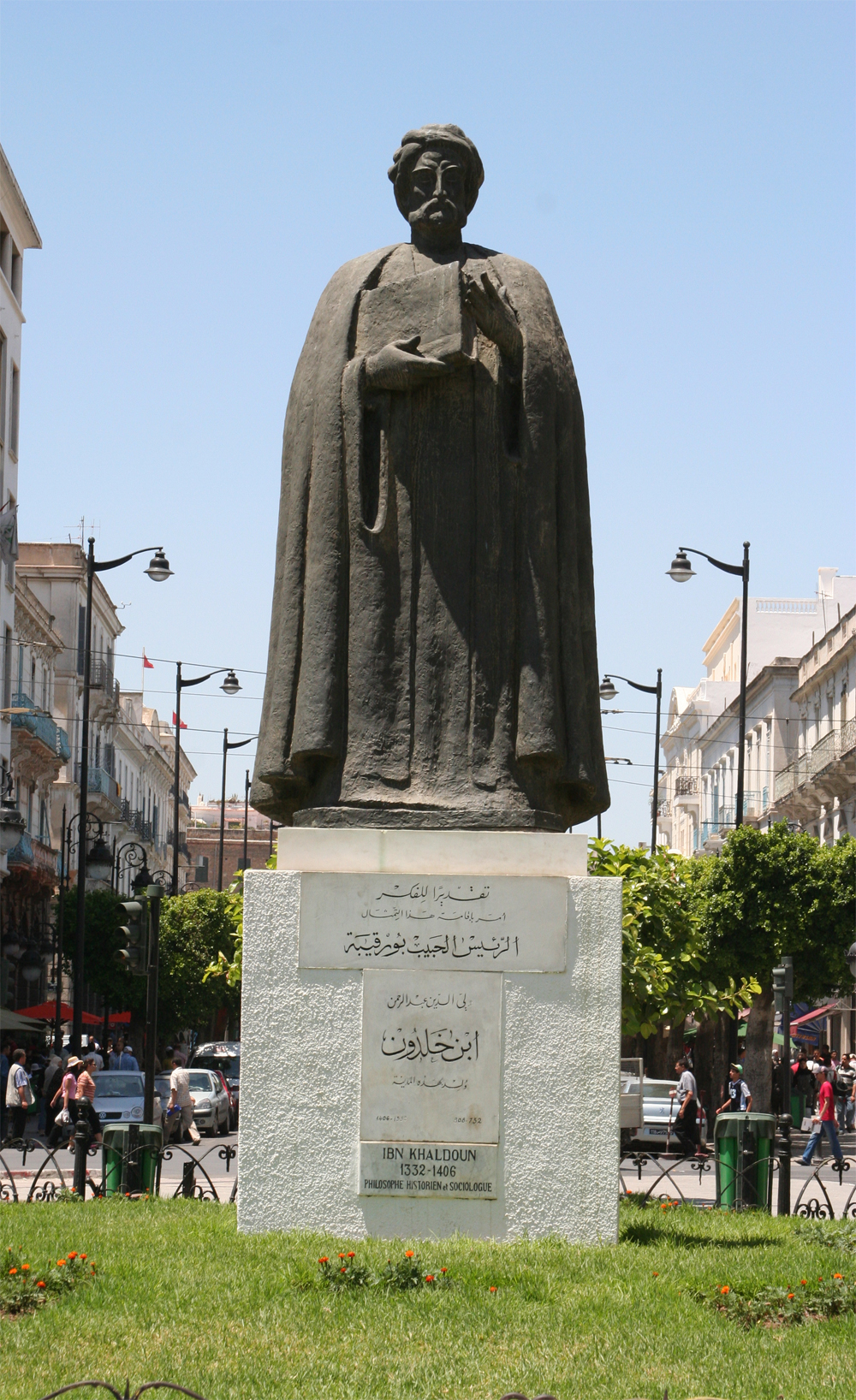
Ibn Khaldun (1332–1406)

It should be known that at the beginning of a dynasty, taxation yields a large revenue from small assessments. At the end of the dynasty, taxation yields a small revenue from large assessments.
Ibn Khaldun on taxes and the ideals of Governance

Until Joseph J. Spengler's 1964 work "Economic Thought of Islam: Ibn Khaldun", Adam Smith (1723–1790) was considered the "Father of Economics". Spengler highlighted the work of Arab scholar Ibn Khaldun (1332–1406) of Tunisia, though what influence Khaldun had in the West is unclear. Arnold Toynbee called Ibn Khaldun a "genius" who "appears to have been inspired by no predecessors and to have found no kindred souls among his contemporaries...and yet, in the Prolegomena (Muqaddimat) to his Universal History he has conceived and formulated a philosophy of history which is undoubtedly the greatest work of its kind that has ever yet been created by any mind in any time or place." Ibn Khaldoun expressed a theory of the lifecycle of civilizations, the specialization of labor, and the value of money as a means of exchange rather than as a store of inherent value. His ideas on taxes were similar to supply-side economics' Laffer curve, which posits that beyond a certain point higher taxes discourage production and actually cause revenues to fall.

=== Nicole Oresme ===
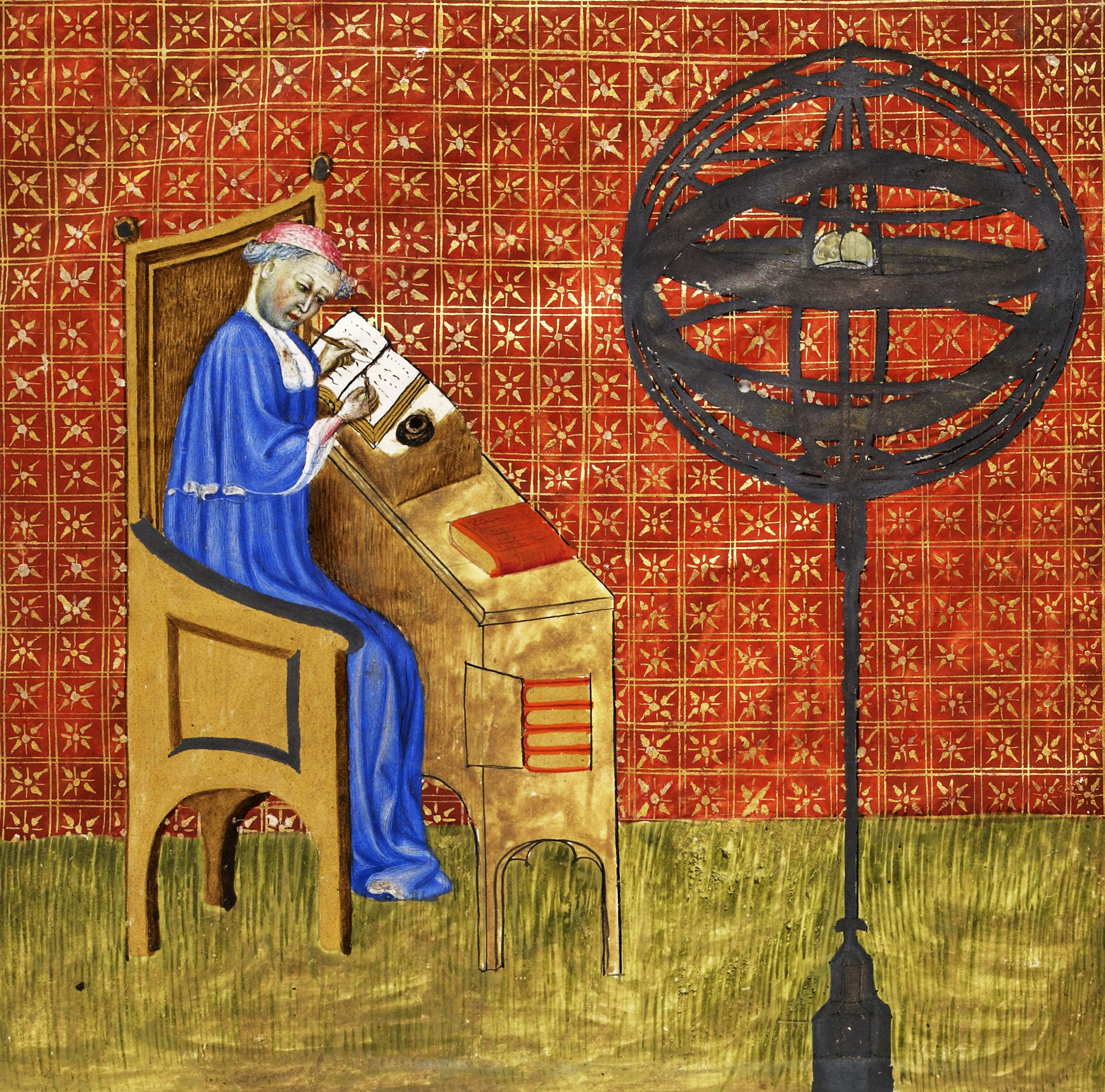
Nicolas d'Oresme (1320–1382)

French philosopher and priest Nicolas d'Oresme (1320–1382) wrote De origine, natura, jure et mutationibus monetarum, about the origin, nature, law, and alterations of money. It is one of the earliest manuscripts on the concept of money. His treatise argues how money or currency belongs to the public, and that the government or sovereign of the economy has no right to control the value of the currency just so that they can profit from it.

=== Antonin of Florence ===
Saint Antoninus of Florence (1389–1459), O.P., was an Italian Dominican friar, who became Archbishop of Florence. Antoninus' writings address social and economic development and argued that the state has a duty to intervene in mercantile affairs for the common good, and an obligation to help the poor and needy. In his primary work, "summa theologica" he was mainly concerned about price, justice and capital theory. Like Duns Scotus, he distinguishes between the natural value of a good and its practical value. The latter is determined by its suitability to satisfy needs (virtuositas), its rarity (raritas) and its subjective value (complacibilitas). Due to this subjective component, there cannot only be one just price, but a bandwidth of more or less just prices.

== Mercantilism and international trade (16th to 18th century) ==
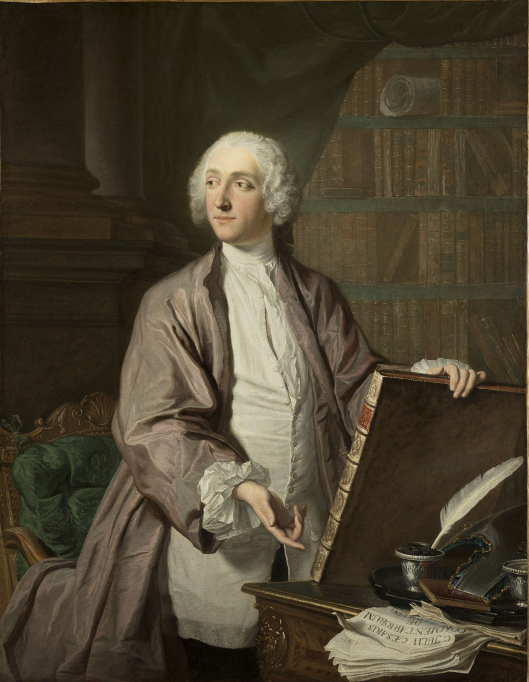
Marquis de Mirabeau (1715–1789)

Mercantilism dominated Europe from the 16th to the 18th century. Despite the localism of the Middle Ages, the waning of feudalism saw new national economic frameworks begin to strengthen. After the 15th century voyages of Christopher Columbus and other explorers opened up new opportunities for trade with the New World and Asia, newly-powerful monarchies wanted a more powerful military state to boost their status. Mercantilism was a political movement and an economic theory that advocated the use of the state's military power to ensure that local markets and supply sources were protected, spawning protectionism. According to the historian Alex M. Feldman, mercantilism was coefficient with feudalism since the same laws that governed access to land ownership were also those that governed access to bullion ownership, rendering the Roman economy or the Byzantine economy functionally and structurally similar to the roots of the economies of the empires of the Atlantic World and also the economy of the Russian Empire.

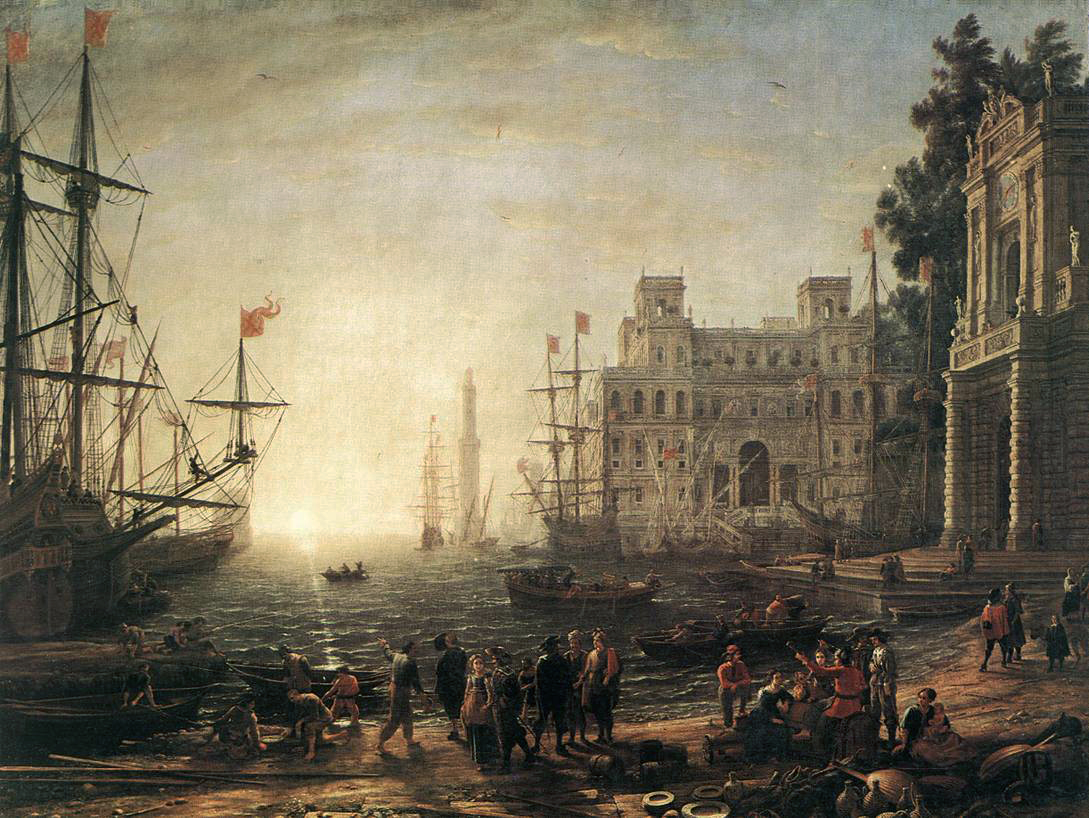
French seaport during the heyday of mercantilism

Mercantile theorists held that international trade could not benefit all countries at the same time. Money and precious metals were the only source of riches in their view, and limited resources must be allocated between countries, therefore tariffs should be used to encourage exports, which bring money into the country, and discourage imports which send it abroad. In other words, a positive balance of trade ought to be maintained through a surplus of exports, often backed by military might. Despite the prevalence of the model, the term mercantilism was not coined until 1763, by Victor de Riqueti, marquis de Mirabeau (1715–1789), and popularized by Adam Smith in 1776, who vigorously opposed it.

=== School of Salamanca ===
In the 16th and 17th centuries the School of Salamanca in Spain developed economic theory, one of the earliest forms of a study in the economic tradition of the field of economics. Even if his doctrine was influenced by the philosophy of Thomas Aquinas, it renewed the economic thought to such an extent that it was defined as "pro-market, pro-hard money, anti-state in many ways, pro-property, and pro-merchant to a surprising extent." There was also the development of an early form of monetarism in response to the introduction of New World gold into the Spanish economy.

With their reflexions on Contract law and fairness in exchange, the members of the School of Salamanca were often confronted with the concept of value. Thus observing the effect of American silver and gold arrivals in Spain, namely lessening of their values and augmentation of prices, Martín de Azpilcueta established the idea of a value-scarcity, first form of the quantity theory of money.

They also renewed the aquilian concept of just price, which respects the principle of commutative justice but depends on many factors. The just price have a certain latitude because it's not the result of God's will or of labor but of the common estimation of the people (communis aestimatio hominum). On this Luis Saravia de la Calle wrote in 1544:

Those who measure the just price by the labour, costs, and risk incurred by the person who deals in the merchandise or produces it, or by the cost of transport or the expense of traveling...or by what he has to pay the factors for their industry, risk, and labour, are greatly in error.... For the just price arises from the abundance or scarcity of goods, merchants, and money...and not from costs, labour, and risk.... Why should a bale of linen brought overland from Brittany at great expense be worth more than one which is transported cheaply by sea?... Why should a book written out by hand be worth more than one which is printed, when the latter is better though it costs less to produce?... The just price is found not by counting the cost but by the common estimation.

However, as Friedrich Hayek has written, the school rarely followed this idea through systematically. His members thought that authorities were sometimes required to intervene and to control prices, especially in monopoly cases or for staples. The opportunity of an economic interventionnism, called arbitrism, wasn't unanimously accepted: if some thought that the prince concerned with public interest is more trustable that greedy merchants, like Domingo de Soto and Tomás de Mercado, others like Luis de Molina, Leonardus Lessius or Juan de Lugo considered that any intervention of the authorities is inopportune owing to the corruption and the clientelism that will be created.

=== Notable contributors ===
==== Sir Thomas More ====
In 1516 English humanist Sir Thomas More (1478–1535) published Utopia, which describes an ideal society where land is owned in common and there is universal education and religious tolerance, inspiring the English Poor Laws (1587) and the communism-socialism movement.

==== Nicolaus Copernicus ====
In 1517 Polish astronomer Nicolaus Copernicus (1473–1543) published the first known argument for the quantity theory of money. In 1519 he also published the first known form of Gresham's law: "Bad money drives out good".

==== Jean Bodin ====
In 1568 Jean Bodin (1530–1596) of France published Reply to Malestroit, containing the first known analysis of inflation, which he claimed was caused by importation of gold and silver from South America, backing the quantity theory of money.

==== Barthélemy de Laffemas ====
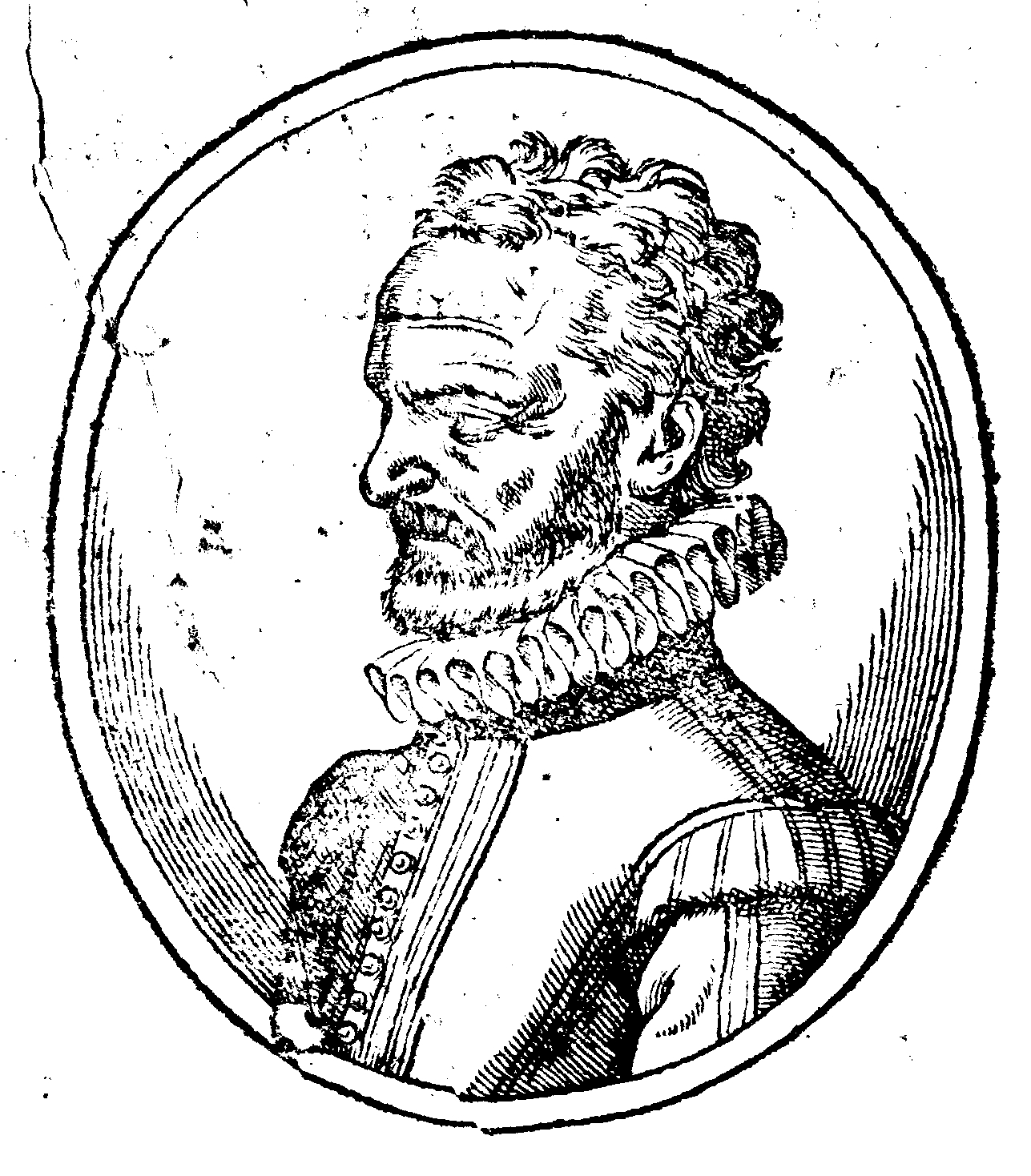
Barthélemy de Laffemas (1545–1612)

In 1598 French mercantilist economist Barthélemy de Laffemas (1545–1612) published Les Trésors et richesses pour mettre l'Estat en splendeur, which blasted those who frowned on French silks because the industry created employment for the poor, the first known mention of underconsumption theory, which was later refined by John Maynard Keynes.

==== Leonardus Lessius ====
In 1605 Flemish Jesuit theologian Leonardus Lessius (1554–1623) published On Justice and Law, the deepest moral-theological study of economics since Aquinas, whose just price approach he claimed was no longer workable. After comparing money's growth via avarice to the propagation of hares, he made the first statement of the price of insurance as being based on risk.

==== Edward Misselden and Gerard Malynes ====
In 1622 English merchants Edward Misselden and Gerard Malynes began a dispute over free trade and the desirability of government regulation of companies, with Malynes arguing against foreign exchange as under the control of bankers, and Misselden arguing that international money exchange and fluctuations in the exchange rate depend upon international trade and not bankers, and that the state should regulate trade to insure export surpluses.

==== Thomas Mun ====
English economist Thomas Mun (1571–1641) describes early mercantilist policy in his book England's Treasure by Foreign Trade, which was not published until 1664, although it was widely circulated in manuscript form during his lifetime. A member of the East India Company, he wrote about his experiences in A Discourse of Trade from England unto the East Indies (1621).

==== Sir William Petty ====
In 1662 English economist Sir William Petty (1623–1687) began publishing short works applying the rational scientific tradition of Francis Bacon to economics, requiring that it only use measurable phenomena and seek quantitative precision, coining the term "political arithmetic", introducing statistical mathematics, and becoming the first scientific economist.

==== Philipp von Hörnigk ====
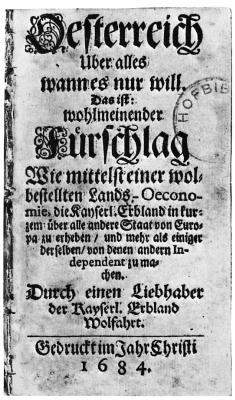
The title page to Philipp von Hörnigk's statement of mercantilist philosophy

Philipp von Hörnigk (1640–1712, sometimes spelt Hornick or Horneck) was born in Frankfurt and became an Austrian civil servant writing in a time when his country was constantly threatened by Ottoman invasion. In Österreich Über Alles, Wann es Nur Will (1684, Austria Over All, If She Only Will) he laid out one of the clearest statements of mercantile policy, listing nine principal rules of national economy:

To inspect the country's soil with the greatest care, and not to leave the agricultural possibilities of a single corner or clod of earth unconsidered... All commodities found in a country, which cannot be used in their natural state, should be worked up within the country... Attention should be given to the population, that it may be as large as the country can support... gold and silver once in the country are under no circumstances to be taken out for any purpose... The inhabitants should make every effort to get along with their domestic products... [Foreign commodities] should be obtained not for gold or silver, but in exchange for other domestic wares... and should be imported in unfinished form, and worked up within the country... Opportunities should be sought night and day for selling the country's superfluous goods to these foreigners in manufactured form... No importation should be allowed under any circumstances of which there is a sufficient supply of suitable quality at home.

Nationalism, self-sufficiency and national power were the basic policies proposed.

==== Jean-Baptiste Colbert and Pierre Le Pesant, Sieur de Boisguilbert ====
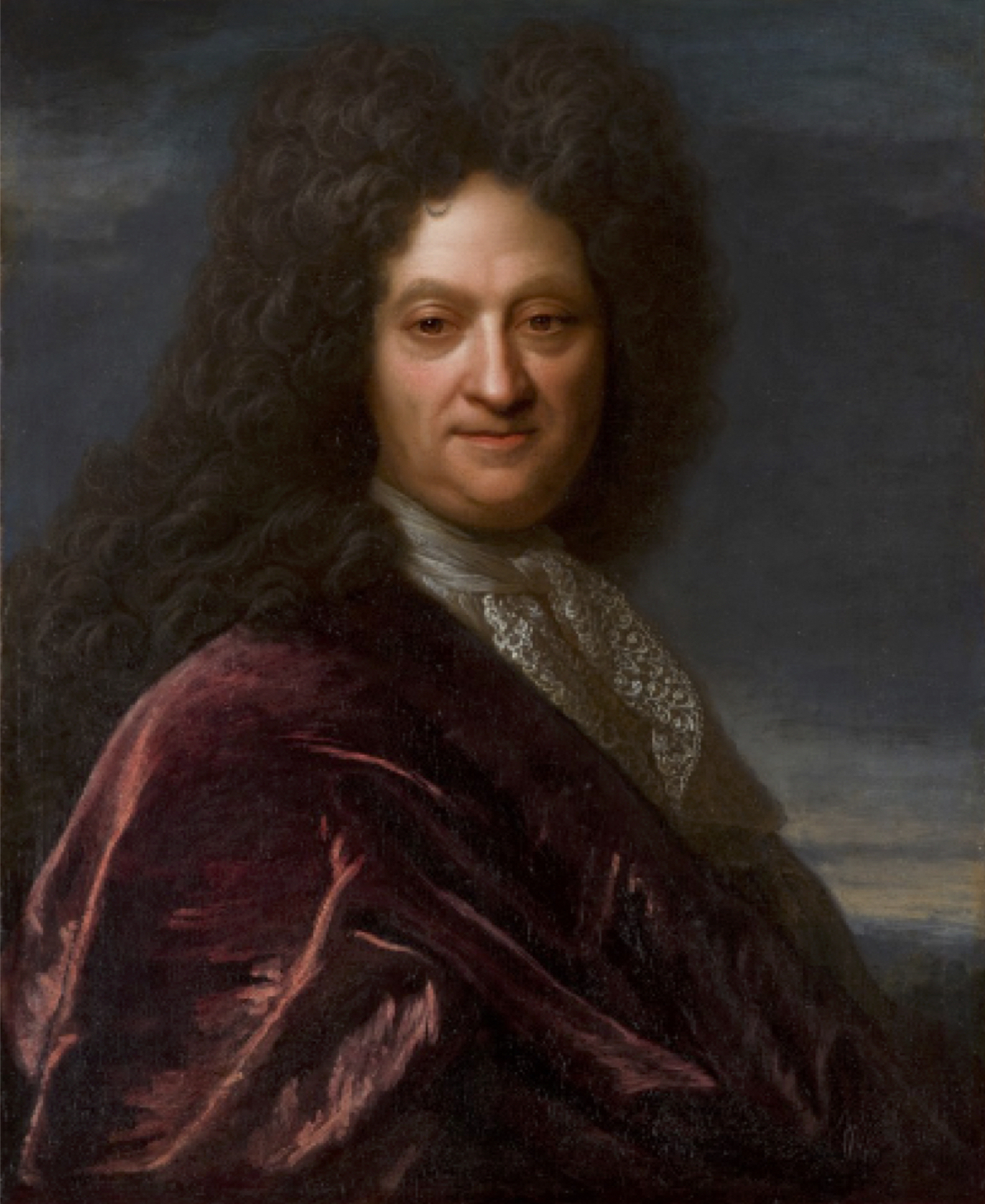
Pierre Le Pesant, sieur de Boisguilbert (1646–1714)

In 1665–1683 Jean-Baptiste Colbert (1619–1683) was minister of finance under King Louis XIV of France, and set up national guilds to regulate major industries. Silk, linen, tapestry, furniture manufacture and wine were examples of the crafts in which France specialized, all of which came to require membership in a guild to operate in until the French Revolution. According to Colbert, "It is simply and solely the abundance of money within a state [which] makes the difference in its grandeur and power."

In 1695 French economist Pierre Le Pesant, sieur de Boisguilbert (1646–1714) wrote a plea to Louis XIV to end Colbert's mercantilist program, containing the first notion of an economical market, becoming the first economist to question mercantile economic policy and value the wealth of a country by its production and exchange of goods instead of its assets.

==== Charles Davenant ====
In 1696 British mercantilist Tory Member of parliament Charles Davenant (1656–1714) published Essay on the East India Trade, displaying the first understanding of consumer demand and perfect competition.

==== Mughal Emperor Aurangzeb ====
Emperor Aurangzeb (r. 1658–1707), ruler of the Mughal India, compiled the sharia based Fatawa-e-Alamgiri along several Muslim scholars which include Islamic economics, whose policies eventually led to the period of Proto-industrialization. It lasted as South Asia's principal regulating body until the beginning of the 18th century.

==== Sir James Steuart ====
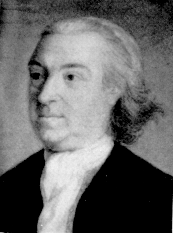
Sir James Steuart (1713–1780)

In 1767 Scottish mercantilist economist Sir James Steuart (1713–1780) published An Inquiry into the Principles of Political Economy, the first book in English with the term "political economy" in the title, and the first complete economics treatise.

== Pre-Classical (17th and 18th century) ==
=== The British Enlightenment ===
In the 17th century Britain went through troubling times, enduring not only political and religious division in the English Civil War, King Charles I's execution, and the Cromwellian dictatorship, but also the Great Plague of London and Great Fire of London. The restoration of the monarchy under Charles II, who had Roman Catholic sympathies, led to turmoil and strife, and his Catholic-leaning successor King James II was swiftly ousted. Invited in his place were Protestant William of Orange and Mary, who assented to the Bill of Rights 1689, ensuring that the Parliament was dominant in what became known as the Glorious Revolution.

The upheaval was accompanied by a number of major scientific advances, including Robert Boyle's discovery of the gas pressure constant (1660) and Sir Isaac Newton's publication of Philosophiae Naturalis Principia Mathematica (1687), which described Newton's laws of motion and his universal law of gravitation.

All these factors spurred the advancement of economic thought. For instance, Richard Cantillon (1680–1734) consciously imitated Newton's forces of inertia and gravity in the natural world with human reason and market competition in the economic world. In his Essay on the Nature of Commerce in General, he argued rational self-interest in a system of freely-adjusting markets would lead to order and mutually-compatible prices. Unlike the mercantilist thinkers however, wealth was found not in trade but in human labor. The first person to tie these ideas into a political framework was John Locke.

==== John Locke ====
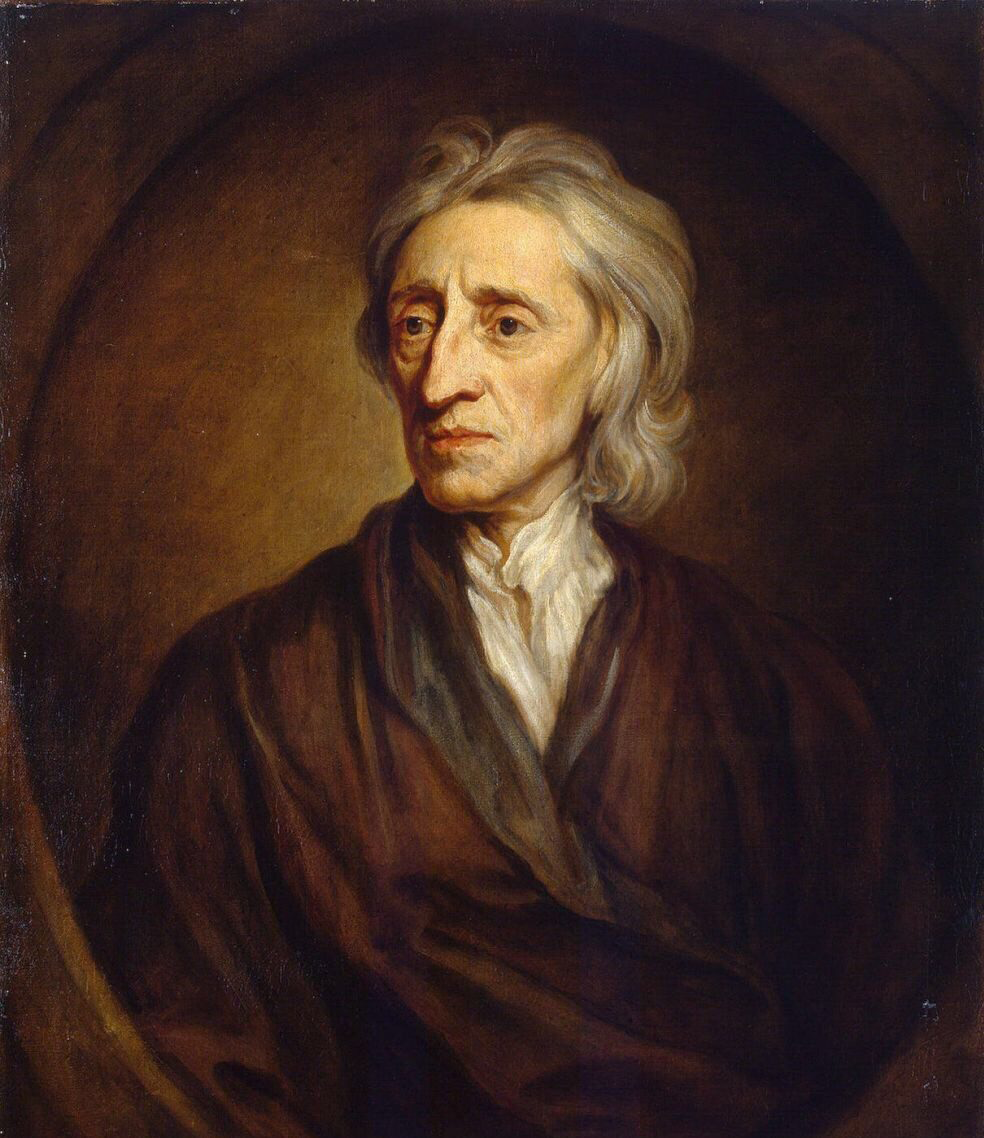
John Locke (1632–1704) combined philosophy, politics and economics into one coherent framework.

John Locke (1632–1704) was born near Bristol, and educated in London and Oxford. He is considered one of the most significant philosophers of his era mainly for his critique of Thomas Hobbes' defense of absolutism in Leviathan (1651) and of his social contract theory. Locke believed that people contracted into society, which was bound to protect their property rights. He defined property broadly to include people's lives and liberties, as well as their wealth. When people combined their labor with their surroundings, that created property rights. In his words from his Second Treatise on Civil Government (1689):

"God hath given the world to men in common... Yet every man has a property in his own person. The labour of his body and the work of his hands we may say are properly his. Whatsoever, then, he removes out of the state that nature hath provided and left it in, he hath mixed his labour with, and joined to it something that is his own, and thereby makes it his property."

Locke argued that not only should the government cease interference with people's property (or their "lives, liberties and estates"), but also that it should positively work to ensure their protection. His views on price and money were laid out in a letter to a Member of Parliament in 1691 entitled Some Considerations on the Consequences of the Lowering of Interest and the Raising of the Value of Money (1691), arguing that the "price of any commodity rises or falls, by the proportion of the number of buyers and sellers", a rule which "holds universally in all things that are to be bought and sold."

==== Dudley North ====
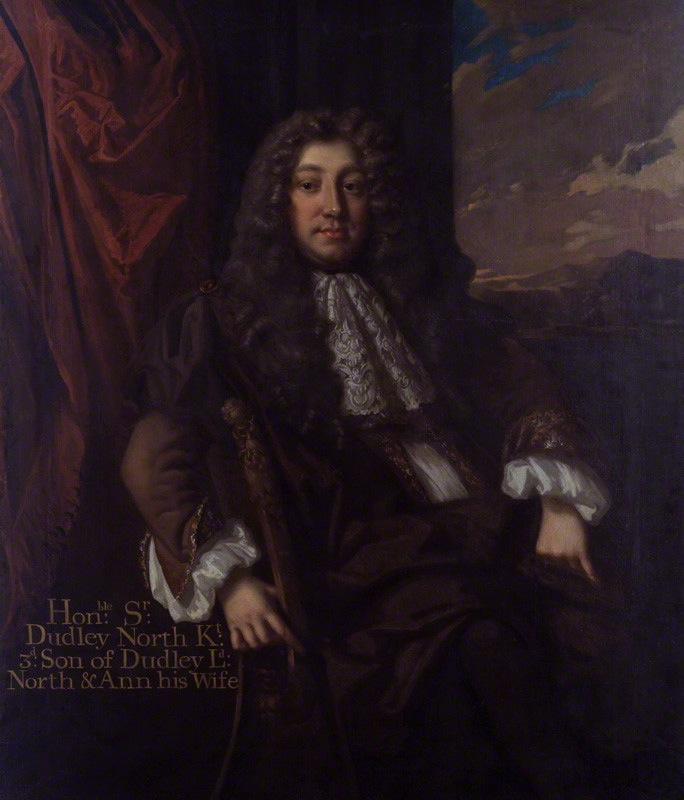
Dudley North (1641–1691) argued that the results of mercantile policy are undesirable.

Dudley North (1641–1691) was a wealthy merchant and landowner who worked for Her Majesty's Treasury and opposed most mercantile policy. His Discourses upon trade (1691), published anonymously, argued against assuming a need for a favorable balance of trade. Trade, he argued, benefits both sides, promotes specialization, division of labor and wealth for everyone. Regulation of trade interferes with these benefits, he said.

==== David Hume ====
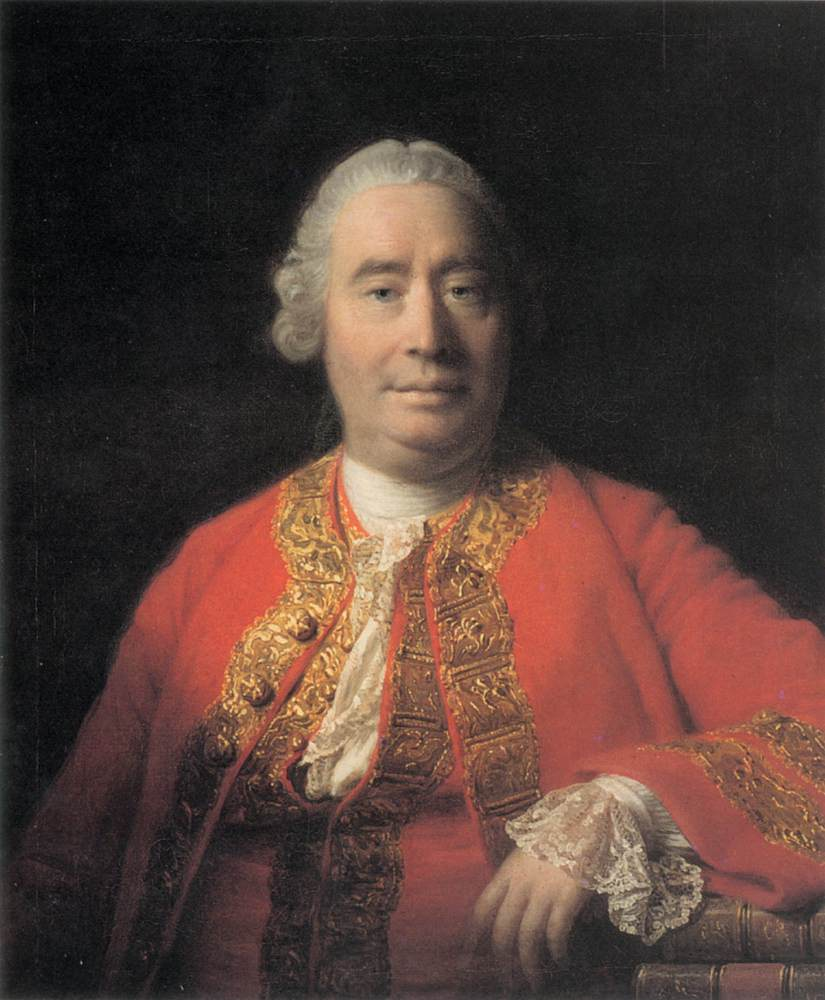
David Hume (1711–1776)

David Hume (1711–1776) agreed with North's philosophy and denounced mercantilist assumptions. His contributions were set down in Political Discourses (1752), and later consolidated in his Essays, Moral, Political, Literary (1777). Adding to the argument that it was undesirable to strive for a favourable balance of trade, Hume argued that it is, in any case, impossible.

Hume held that any surplus of exports would be paid for by imports of gold and silver. This would increase the money supply, causing prices to rise. That in turn would cause a decline in exports until the balance with imports is restored.

==== Bernard Mandeville ====
Bernard Mandeville (1670–1733) was an Anglo-Dutch philosopher, political economist and satirist. His main thesis is that the actions of men cannot be divided into lower and higher. The higher life of man is a mere fiction introduced by philosophers and rulers to simplify government and the relations of society. In fact, virtue (which he defined as "every performance by which man, contrary to the impulse of nature, should endeavour the benefit of others, or the conquest of his own passions, out of a rational ambition of being good") is actually detrimental to the state in its commercial and intellectual progress. This is because it is the vices (i.e., the self-regarding actions of men) which alone, by means of inventions and the circulation of capital (economics) in connection with luxurious living, stimulate society into action and progress.

==== Francis Hutcheson ====
Francis Hutcheson (1694–1746), the teacher of Adam Smith from 1737 to 1740 is considered the end of a long tradition of thought on economics as "household or family (οἶκος) management", stemming from Xenophon's work Oeconomicus.

=== The Physiocrats and the circular flow ===
Similarly disenchanted with regulation on trade inspired by mercantilism, the Frenchman Vincent de Gournay (1712–1759) reputedly asked why it was so hard to laissez faire ("let it be"), laissez passer ("let it pass"), advocating free enterprise and free trade. He was one of the early physiocrats, who regarded agriculture as the source of wealth. As historian David B. Danbom wrote, the Physiocrats "damned cities for their artificiality and praised more natural styles of living. They celebrated farmers." Over the end of the seventeenth and beginning of the eighteenth century major advances in natural science and anatomy included the discovery of blood circulation through the human body – documented by William Harvey in 1628. This concept was mirrored in the physiocrats' economic theory, with the notion of a circular flow of income throughout an economy.

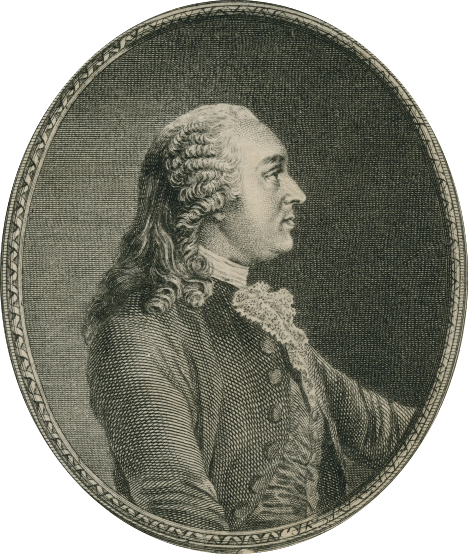
Anne Robert Jacques Turgot (1727–1781)

François Quesnay (1694–1774) served as the court physician to King Louis XV of France. He believed that trade and industry were not sources of wealth, and instead in his book Tableau économique (1758, Economic Table) argued that agricultural surpluses, by flowing through the economy in the form of rent, wages, and purchases, were the real economic movers. Firstly, wrote Quesnay, regulation impedes the flow of income throughout all social classes and therefore economic development. Secondly, taxes on the productive classes, such as farmers, should be reduced in favour of rises for unproductive classes, such as landowners, since their luxurious way of life distorts the income flow. (Later, in the early 19th century, David Ricardo showed that taxes on land are non-transferable to tenants according to his Law of Rent.)

Jacques Turgot (1727–1781) was born in Paris to an old Norman family. His best-known work, Réflexions sur la formation et la distribution des richesses (Reflections on the Formation and Distribution of Wealth) (1766) developed Quesnay's theory that land is the only source of wealth. Turgot viewed society in terms of three classes: the productive agricultural class, the salaried artisan class (classe stipendice) and the landowning class (classe disponible). He argued that only the net product of land should be taxed and advocated complete freedom of commerce and industry.

In August 1774 King Louis XVI appointed Turgot as minister of finance, and in the space of two years he introduced many anti-mercantile and anti-feudal measures, supported by the king. His guiding principles, as given to the king, were "no bankruptcy, no tax increases, no borrowing". Turgot's ultimate wish was to have a single tax on land and to abolish all other indirect taxes, but measures he introduced before that met with overwhelming opposition from landed interests. Two edicts in particular, one suppressing corvées (forced-labour obligations due by peasants to landlords) and another renouncing privileges given to guilds, inflamed influential opinion. He was forced from office in 1776.

== Classical (18th and 19th century) ==
=== Ferdinando Galiani and On Money ===
In 1751, Neapolitan philosopher Ferdinando Galiani published a nearly exhaustive treatise on money called Della Moneta (On Money), 25 years before Adam Smith's The Wealth of Nations, and therefore is seen as possibly the first truly modern economic analysis. In its five sections, Della Moneta covered all modern aspects of monetary theory, including the value and origin of money, its regulation, and inflation. This text remained cited by various economists for centuries, as wide-ranging a list as Karl Marx and Austrian economist Joseph Schumpeter.

=== Adam Smith and The Wealth of Nations ===
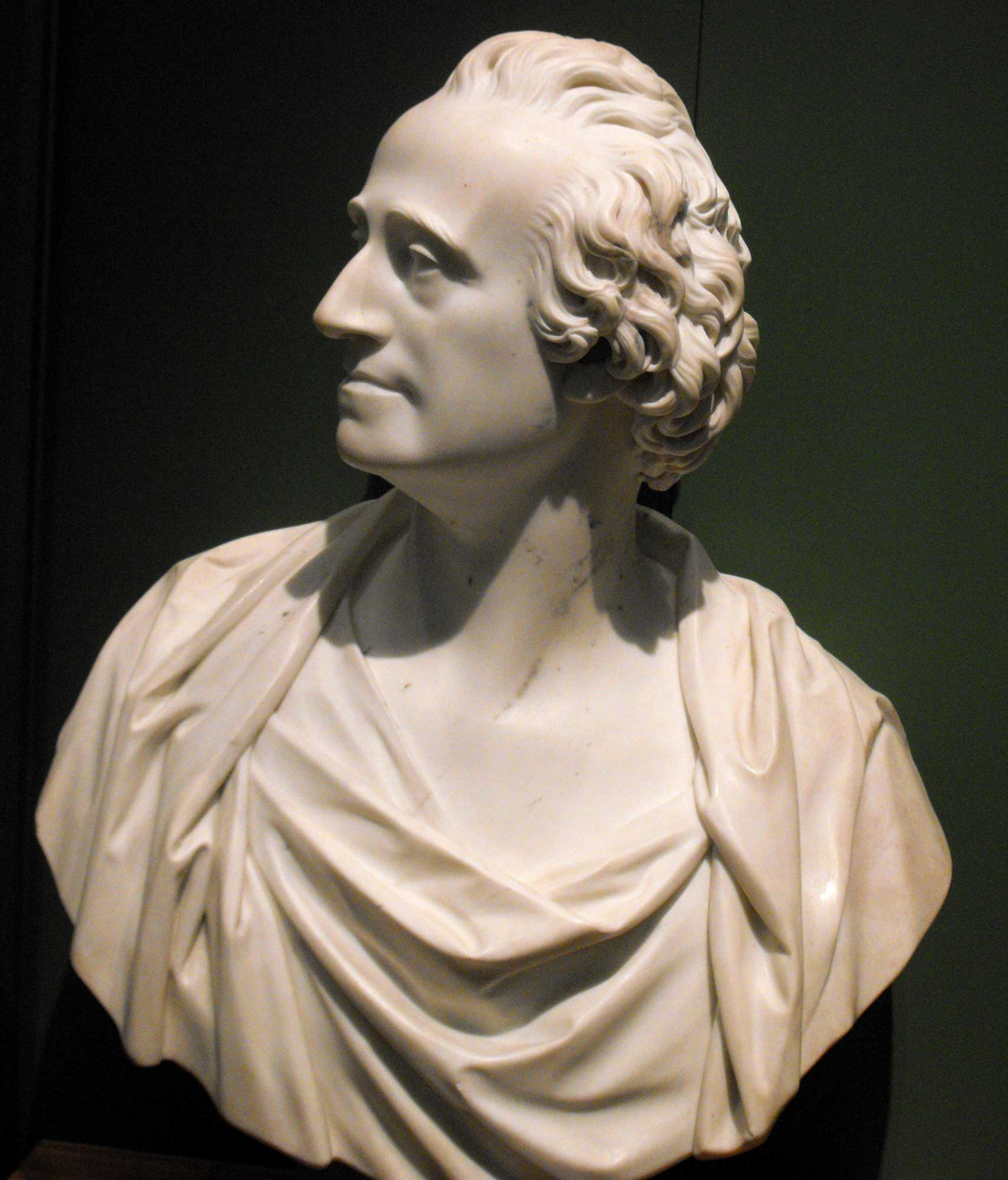
Adam Smith (1723–1790), father of modern political economy

Adam Smith (1723–1790) is popularly seen as the father of modern political economy. His 1776 publication An Inquiry Into the Nature and Causes of the Wealth of Nations happened to coincide not only with the American Revolution, shortly before the Europe-wide upheavals of the French Revolution, but also the dawn of a new industrial revolution that allowed more wealth to be created on a larger scale than ever before.

Smith was a Scottish moral philosopher, whose first book was The Theory of Moral Sentiments (1759). He argued in it that people's ethical systems develop through personal relations with other individuals, that right and wrong are sensed through others' reactions to one's behaviour. This gained Smith more popularity than his next work, The Wealth of Nations, which the general public initially ignored. Yet Smith's political economic magnum opus was successful in circles that mattered.

=== Adam Smith's Invisible Hand ===
"It is not from the benevolence of the butcher, the brewer or the baker, that we expect our dinner, but from their regard to their own self-interest. We address ourselves, not to their humanity but to their self-love, and never talk to them of our own necessities but of their advantages."
Adam Smith's famous statement on self-interest

Smith argued for a "system of natural liberty" where individual effort was the producer of social good. Smith believed even the selfish within society were kept under restraint and worked for the good of all when acting in a competitive market. Prices are often unrepresentative of the true value of goods and services. Following John Locke, Smith thought true value of things derived from the amount of labour invested in them.

Every man is rich or poor according to the degree in which he can afford to enjoy the necessaries, conveniencies, and amusements of human life. But after the division of labour has once thoroughly taken place, it is but a very small part of these with which a man's own labour can supply him. The far greater part of them he must derive from the labour of other people, and he must be rich or poor according to the quantity of that labour which he can command, or which he can afford to purchase. The value of any commodity, therefore, to the person who possesses it, and who means not to use or consume it himself, but to exchange it for other commodities, is equal to the quantity of labour which it enables him to purchase or command. Labour, therefore, is the real measure of the exchangeable value of all commodities. The real price of every thing, what every thing really costs to the man who wants to acquire it, is the toil and trouble of acquiring it.

—

When the butchers, the brewers and the bakers acted under the restraint of an open market economy, their pursuit of self-interest, thought Smith, paradoxically drives the process to correct real life prices to their just values. His classic statement on competition goes as follows.

When the quantity of any commodity which is brought to market falls short of the effectual demand, all those who are willing to pay... cannot be supplied with the quantity which they want... Some of them will be willing to give more. A competition will begin among them, and the market price will rise... When the quantity brought to market exceeds the effectual demand, it cannot be all sold to those who are willing to pay the whole value of the rent, wages and profit, which must be paid to bring it thither... The market price will sink...

==== Limitations ====
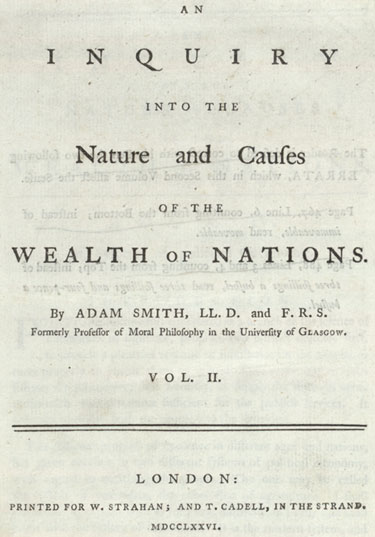
Adam Smith's title page of The Wealth of Nations

Smith's vision of a free market economy, based on secure property, capital accumulation, widening markets and a division of labour contrasted with the mercantilist tendency to attempt to "regulate all evil human actions." Smith believed there were precisely three legitimate functions of government. The third function was...

...erecting and maintaining certain public works and certain public institutions, which it can never be for the interest of any individual or small number of individuals, to erect and maintain... Every system which endeavours... to draw towards a particular species of industry a greater share of the capital of the society than what would naturally go to it... retards, instead of accelerating, the progress of the society toward real wealth and greatness.

In addition to the necessity of public leadership in certain sectors Smith argued, secondly, that cartels were undesirable because of their potential to limit production and quality of goods and services. Thirdly, Smith criticised government support of any kind of monopoly which always charges the highest price "which can be squeezed out of the buyers". The existence of monopoly and the potential for cartels, which would later form the core of competition law policy, could distort the benefits of free markets to the advantage of businesses at the expense of consumer sovereignty.

=== William Pitt the Younger ===
William Pitt the Younger (1759–1806), Tory Prime Minister in 1783–1801 based his tax proposals on Smith's ideas, and advocated free trade as a devout disciple of The Wealth of Nations. Smith was appointed a commissioner of customs and within twenty years Smith had a following of new generation writers who were intent on building the science of political economy.

=== Edmund Burke ===
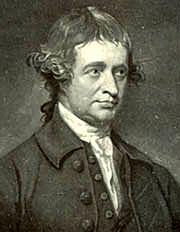
Edmund Burke (1729–1797)

Adam Smith expressed an affinity to the opinions of Irish MP Edmund Burke (1729–1797), known widely as a political philosopher:

"Burke is the only man I ever knew who thinks on economic subjects exactly as I do without any previous communication having passed between us."

Burke was an established political economist himself, known for his book Thoughts and Details on Scarcity. He was widely critical of liberal politics, and condemned the French Revolution which began in 1789. In Reflections on the Revolution in France (1790) he wrote that the "age of chivalry is dead, that of sophisters, economists and calculators has succeeded, and the glory of Europe is extinguished forever." Smith's contemporary influences included François Quesnay and Jacques Turgot whom he met on a visit to Paris, and David Hume, his Scottish compatriot. The times produced a common need among thinkers to explain social upheavals of the Industrial Revolution taking place, and in the seeming chaos without the feudal and monarchical structures of Europe, show there was order still.

=== Jeremy Bentham ===
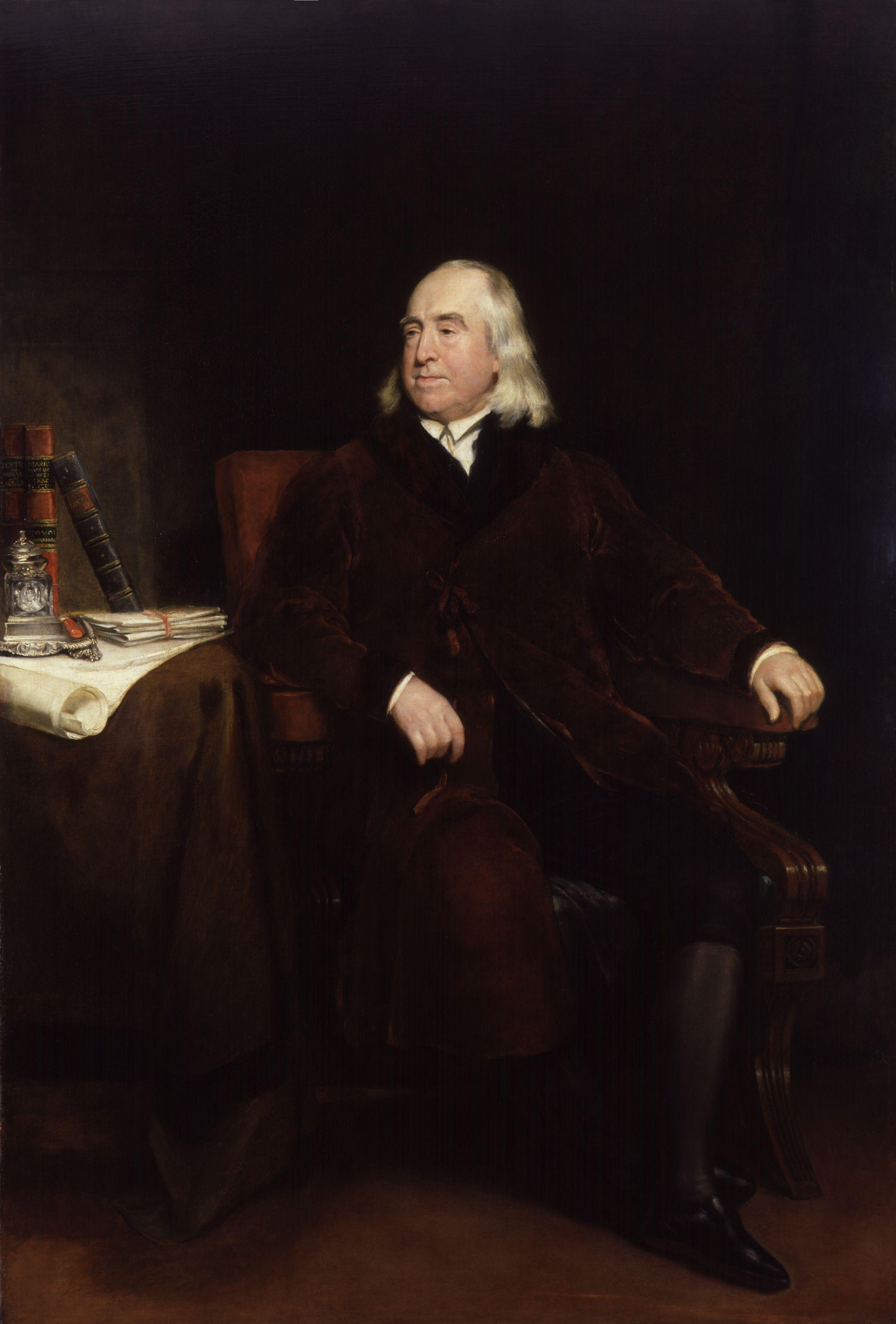
Jeremy Bentham (1748–1832) believed in "the greatest good for the greatest number".

Jeremy Bentham (1748–1832) was perhaps the most radical thinker of his time, and developed the concept of utilitarianism. Bentham was an atheist, a prison reformer, animal rights activist, believer in universal suffrage, freedom of speech, free trade and health insurance at a time when few dared to argue for any of these ideas. He was schooled rigorously from an early age, finishing university and being called to the bar at 18. His first book, A Fragment on Government (1776), published anonymously, was a trenchant critique of William Blackstone's Commentaries on the Laws of England. This gained wide success until it was found that the young Bentham, and not a revered Professor had penned it. In An Introduction to the Principles of Morals and Legislation (1789) Bentham set out his theory of utility.

=== Jean-Baptiste Say ===
Jean-Baptiste Say (1767–1832) was a Frenchman born in Lyon who helped popularize Adam Smith's work in France. His book A Treatise on Political Economy (1803) contained a brief passage, which later became orthodoxy in political economics until the Great Depression, now known as Say's law of markets. Say argued that there could never be a general deficiency of demand or a general glut of commodities in the whole economy. People produce things, to fulfill their own wants rather than those of others, therefore production is not a question of supply but an indication of producers demanding goods.

Say agreed that a part of income is saved by households, but in the long term, savings are invested. Investment and consumption are the two elements of demand, so that production is demand, therefore it is impossible for production to outrun demand, or for there to be a "general glut" of supply. Say also argued that money was neutral, because its sole role is to facilitate exchanges, therefore, people demand money only to buy commodities; "money is a veil".

=== David Ricardo ===
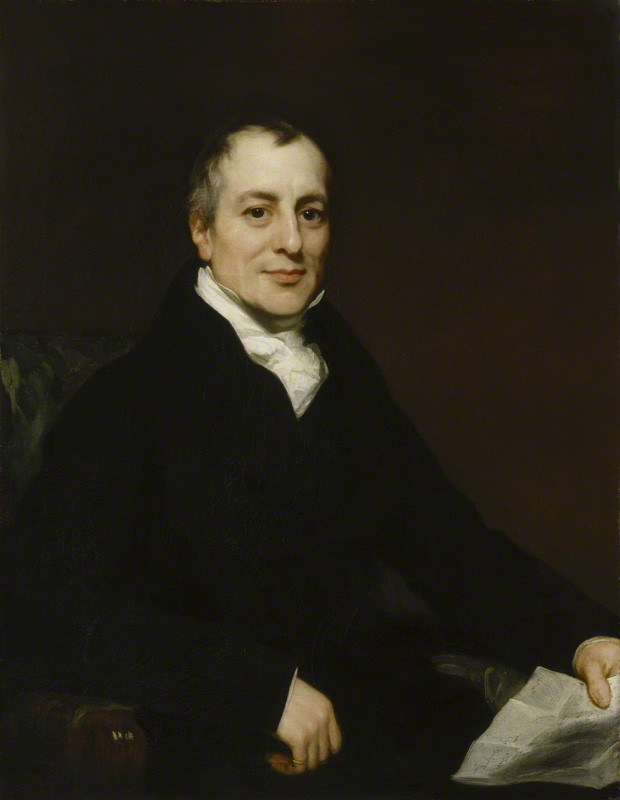
David Ricardo (1772–1823) is renowned for his law of comparative advantage.

David Ricardo (1772–1823) was born in London. By the age of 26, he had become a wealthy stock market trader, and bought himself a constituency seat in Ireland to gain a platform in the British parliament's House of Commons. Ricardo's best known work is On the Principles of Political Economy and Taxation (1817), which contains his critique of barriers to international trade and a description of the manner in which income is distributed in the population. Ricardo made a distinction between workers, who received a wage fixed to a level at which they could survive, the landowners, who earn a rent, and capitalists, who own capital and receive a profit, a residual part of the income.

If population grows, it becomes necessary to cultivate additional land, whose fertility is lower than that of already cultivated fields, because of the law of decreasing productivity. Therefore, the cost of the production of the wheat increases, as well as the price of the wheat: The rents increase also, the wages, indexed to inflation (because they must allow workers to survive) as well. Profits decrease, until the capitalists can no longer invest. The economy, Ricardo concluded, is bound to tend towards a steady state.

=== Jean Charles Léonard de Sismondi ===
Jean Charles Léonard de Sismondi (1773–1842) was the earliest author of systemic Crisis theory.

=== John Stuart Mill ===
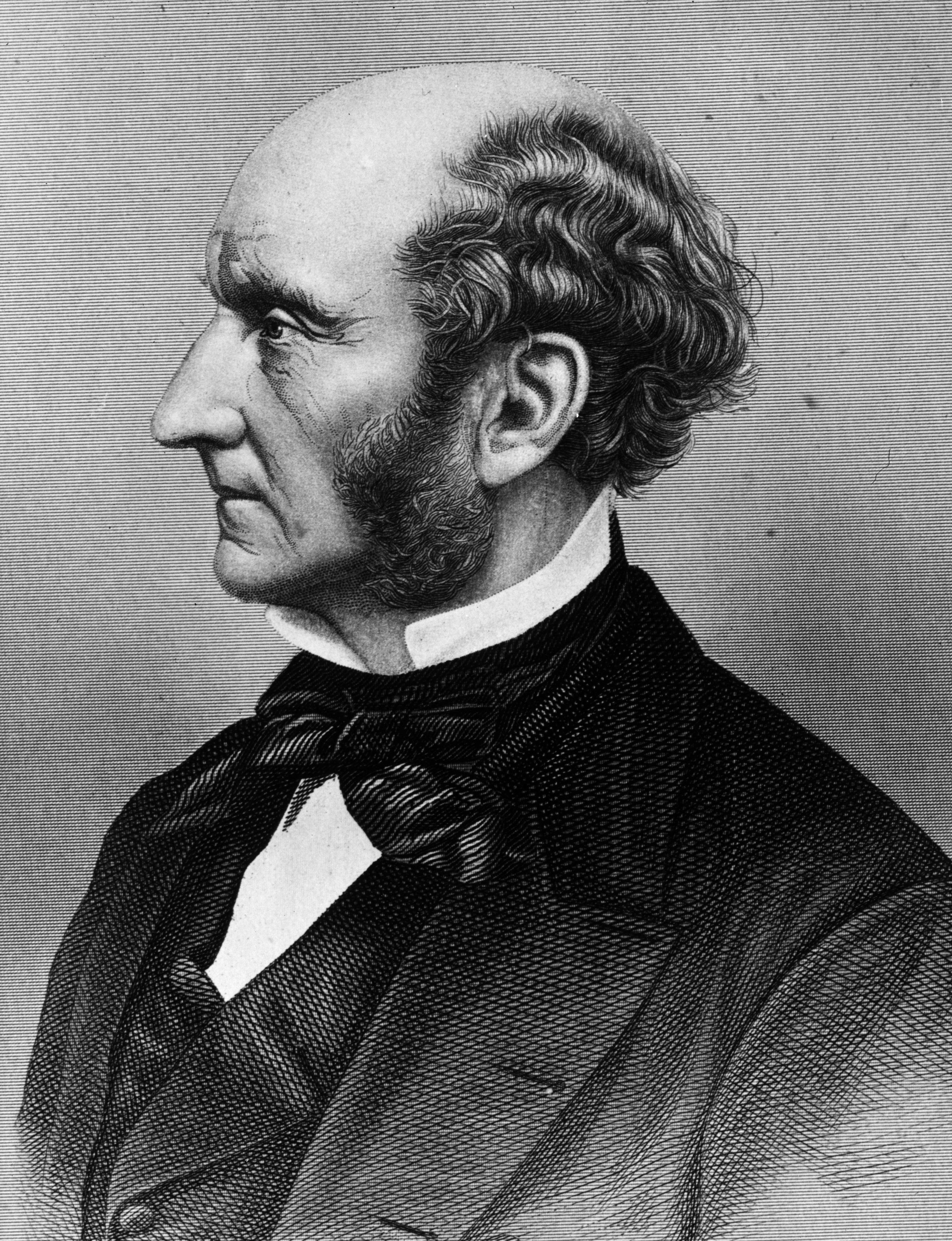
John Stuart Mill (1806–1873), educated in the philosophy of Jeremy Bentham, wrote the most authoritative economics text of his time.

John Stuart Mill (1806–1873) was the dominant figure of political economic thought of his time, as well as a Member of parliament for the seat of Westminster, and a leading political philosopher. Mill was a child prodigy, reading Ancient Greek from the age of 3, and being vigorously schooled by his father James Mill. Jeremy Bentham was a close mentor and family friend, and Mill was heavily influenced by David Ricardo. Mill's textbook, first published in 1848 and titled Principles of Political Economy was essentially a summary of the economic thought of the mid-nineteenth century.

Principles of Political Economy (1848) was used as the standard text by most universities well into the beginning of the twentieth century. On the question of economic growth Mill tried to find a middle ground between Adam Smith's view of ever-expanding opportunities for trade and technological innovation and Thomas Malthus' view of the inherent limits of population. In his fourth book Mill set out a number of possible future outcomes, rather than predicting one in particular.

=== Classical political economy ===
The classical economists were referred to as a group for the first time by Karl Marx. One unifying part of their theories was the labour theory of value, contrasting to value deriving from a general equilibrium theory of supply and demand. These economists had seen the first economic and social transformation brought by the Industrial Revolution: rural depopulation, precariousness, poverty, apparition of a working class.

They wondered about population growth, because demographic transition had begun in Great Britain at that time. They also asked many fundamental questions, about the source of value, the causes of economic growth and the role of money in the economy. They supported a free-market economy, arguing it was a natural system based upon freedom and property. However, these economists were divided and did not make up a unified current of thought.

A notable current within classical economics was underconsumption theory, as advanced by the Birmingham School and Thomas Robert Malthus in the early 19th century. These argued for government action to mitigate unemployment and economic downturns, and were an intellectual predecessor of what later became Keynesian economics in the 1930s. Another notable school was Manchester capitalism, which advocated free trade, against the previous policy of mercantilism.

=== Marxian critique of political economy ===
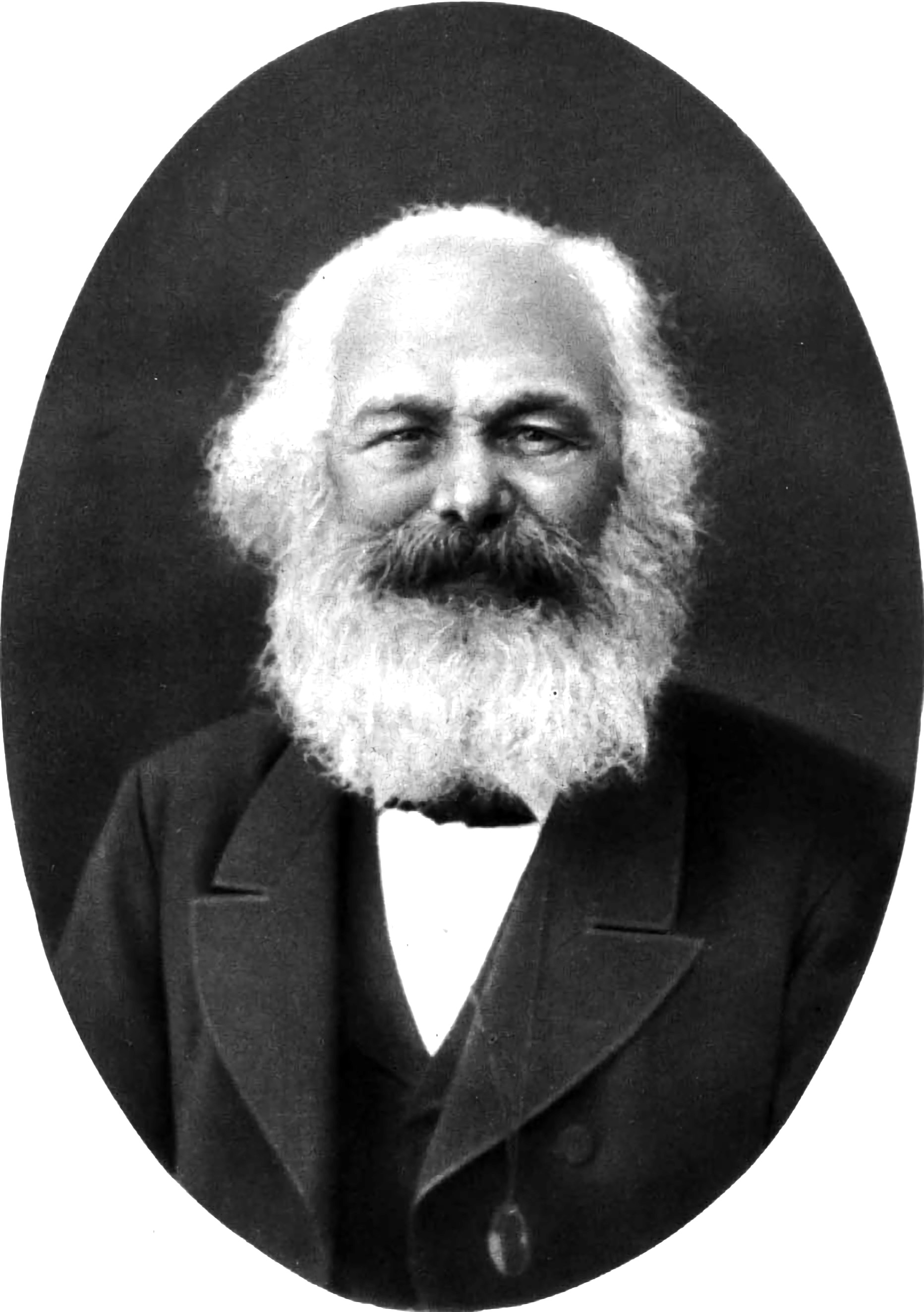
Karl Marx (1818–1883) published a critique of political economy.

Marx wrote his magnum opus Das Kapital (Capital: A Critique of Political Economy) (1867) at the British Museum's library in London. Karl Marx begins with the concept of commodities, which he views as a historically specific phenomenon. He hence looks to history to state that before capital, production was based on slavery – in ancient Rome for example – then serfdom in the feudal societies of medieval Europe. Marx viewed the current mode of production as one which would ultimately produce an erratic and unstable situation allowing the conditions for revolution in the long term.

Marx uses the word commodity in an extensive metaphysical discussion of the nature of material wealth, how the objects of wealth are perceived and how they can be used. A commodity contrasts to objects of the natural world. When people mix their labor with an object it becomes a commodity. In the natural world there are trees, diamonds, iron ore and people. In the world of the economists they become chairs, rings, factories and workers. However, says Marx, commodities have a dual nature. He distinguishes the use value of a thing from its exchange value. If commodities are considered absolutely isolated from their useful qualities the common property is human labor in the abstract. A phenomenon unique to a specific historical configuration, which is dependent on certain social practices, most dominantly waged work, executed en masse. Marx argued for critique by linking his ideas of surplus value and socially necessary labor time with the classical labor theory of value and theories of rent.

Marx believed that a reserve army of the unemployed would grow and grow, fueling a downward pressure on wages as desperate people accepted work for less. But this would produce a deficit of demand as the people's power to purchase products lagged. A glut of unsold products would result, production would be cut back, and profits decline until capital accumulation halted in an economic depression. When the glut cleared, the economy would again start to boom before the next cyclical bust begins. With every boom and bust, with every capitalist crisis, thought Marx, tension and conflict between the increasingly polarized classes of capitalists and workers would heighten due to the tendency of the rate of profit to fall.

=== Henry George and Georgism ===
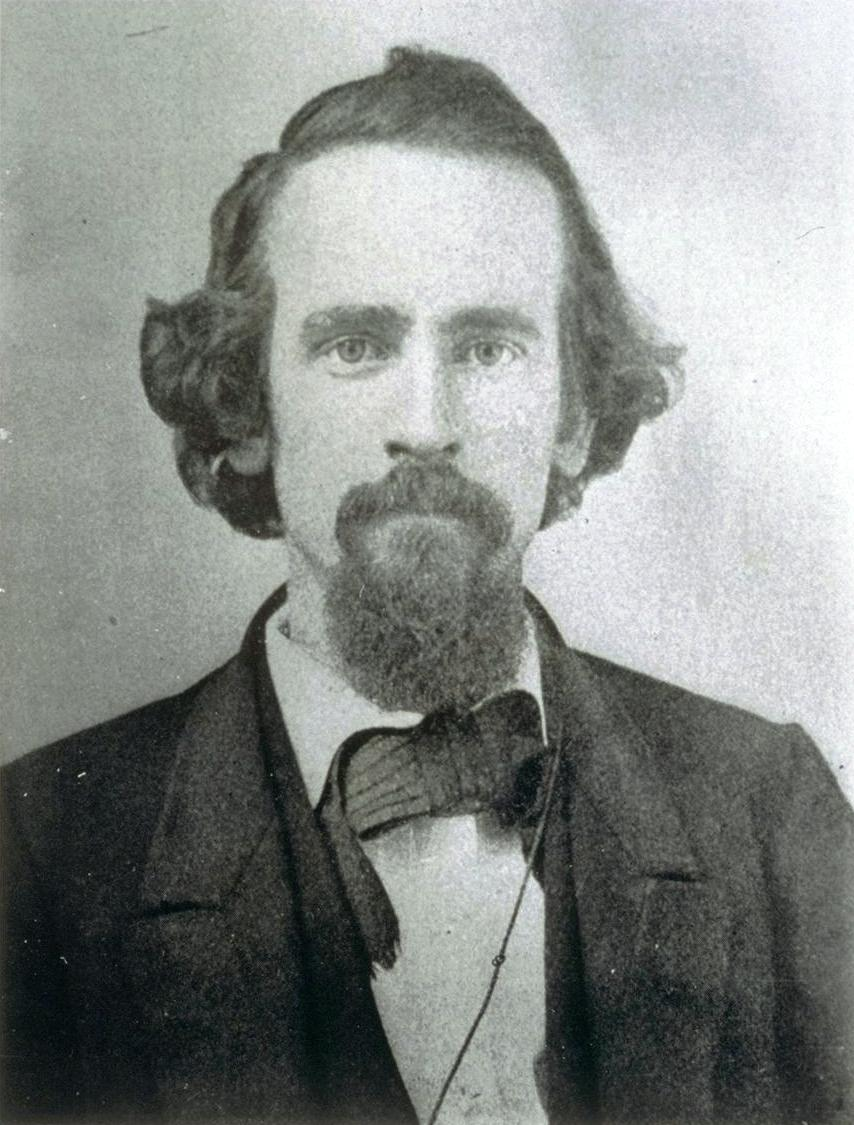
In 1879, Henry George published an explosively popular treatise on why poverty accompanies progress and boom follows bust.

Henry George (1839–1897) is popularly recognized as the intellectual inspiration for the economic philosophy now known as Georgism. George is said to be the last classical economist. During his life, George was one of the three most famous Americans, along with Henry Ford and Thomas Edison. George's first book, Progress and Poverty, was one of the most widely printed books in English, selling between 3 and 6 million copies by the early 1900s. Progress and Poverty sparked a worldwide reform movement and is sometimes marked as the beginning of the Progressive Era. Georgism declined in the second half of the 20th century as the Marxist and Austrian and Keynesian neoclassical schools gained popularity. However, there are still active Georgist organizations and land reform movements around the world. George's ideas have been incorporated into the philosophies of socialism, libertarianism, and ecological economics. Paul Samuelson listed Henry George as one of only six "American saints" in classical economics.

=== The London School of Economics ===
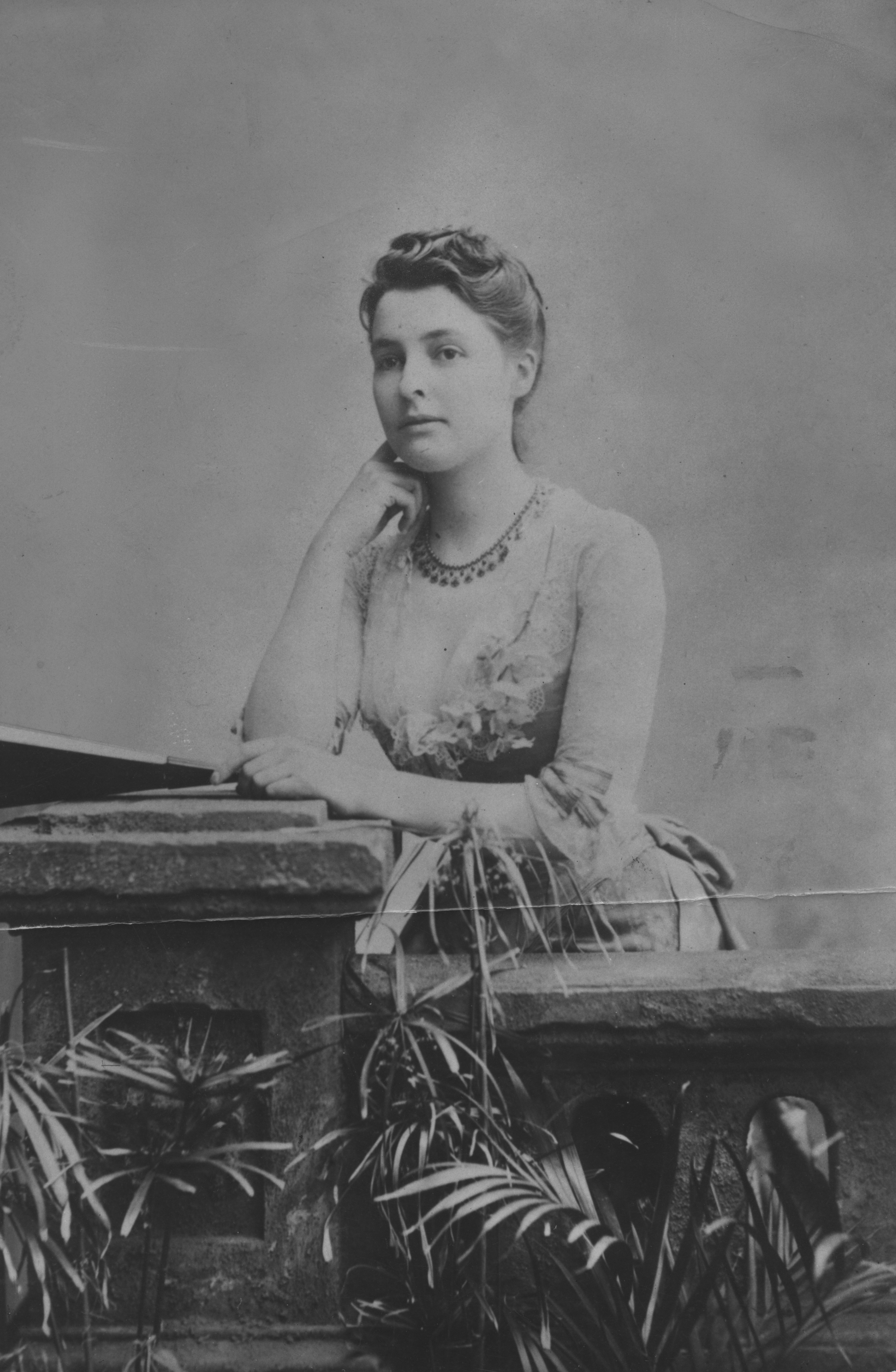
Beatrice Webb (1858–1943)

In 1895 the London School of Economics (LSE) was founded by Fabian Society members Sidney Webb (1859–1947), Beatrice Webb (1858–1943), and George Bernard Shaw (1856–1950), joining the University of London in 1900.

In the 1930s LSE member Sir Roy G.D. Allen (1906–1983) popularized the use of mathematics in economics.

== Neoclassical (19th and early 20th century) ==
Neoclassical economics developed in the 1870s. There were three main independent schools. The Cambridge School was founded with the 1871 publication of Jevons' Theory of Political Economy, developing theories of partial equilibrium and focusing on market failures. Its main representatives were Stanley Jevons, Alfred Marshall, and Arthur Pigou. The Austrian School of Economics was made up of Austrian economists Carl Menger, Eugen von Böhm-Bawerk, and Friedrich von Wieser, who developed the theory of capital and tried to explain economic crises. It was founded with the 1871 publication of Menger's Principles of Economics. The Lausanne School, led by Léon Walras and Vilfredo Pareto, developed the theories of general equilibrium and Pareto efficiency. It was founded with the 1874 publication of Walras' Elements of Pure Economics.

=== Anglo-American neoclassical ===
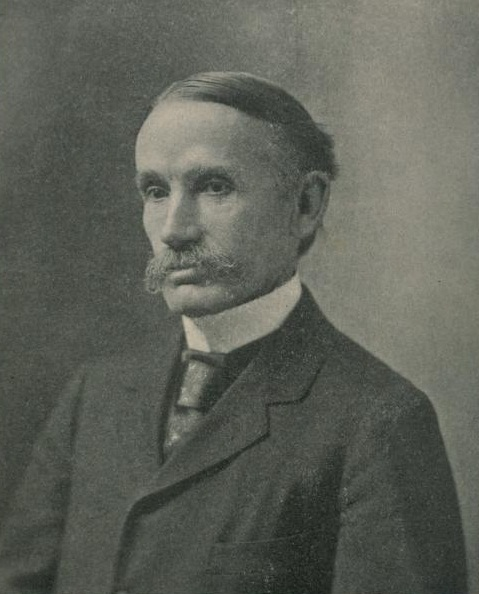
John Bates Clark (1847–1938)

American economist John Bates Clark (1847–1938) promoted the marginalist revolution, publishing The Distribution of Wealth (1899), which proposed Clark's Law of Capitalism: "Given competition and homogeneous factors of production labor and capital, the repartition of the social product will be according to the productivity of the last physical input of units of labor and capital", also expressed as "What a social class gets is, under natural law, what it contributes to the general output of industry." In 1947 the John Bates Clark Medal was established in his honor.

==== William Stanley Jevons ====
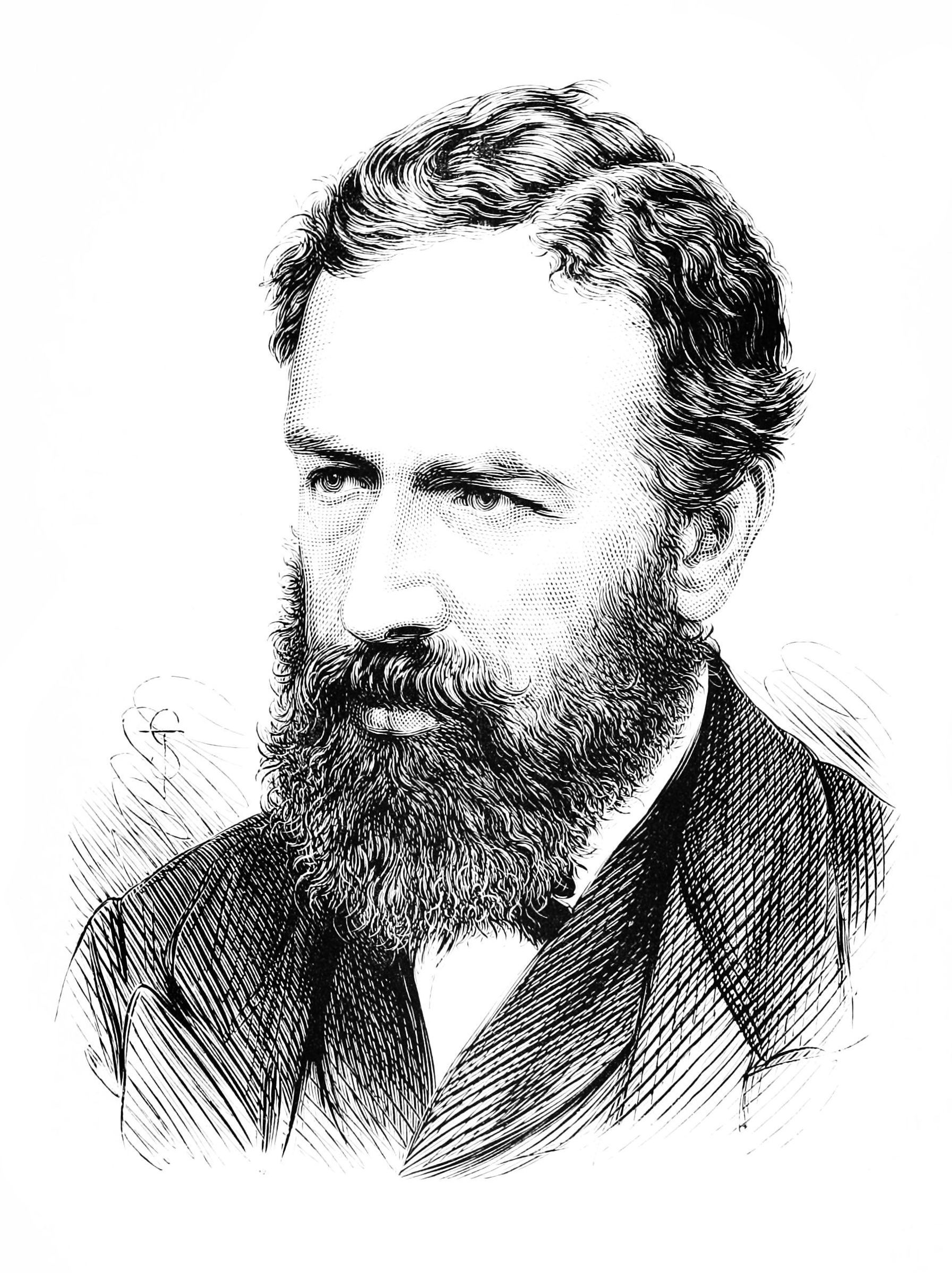
William Stanley Jevons (1835–1882) helped popularize marginal utility theory.

In 1871 Menger's English counterpart Stanley Jevons (1835–1882) independently published Theory of Political Economy (1871), stating that at the margin the satisfaction of goods and services decreases. An example of the Theory of Diminishing Marginal Utility is that for every orange one eats, one gets less pleasure until one stops eating oranges completely.

==== Alfred Marshall ====
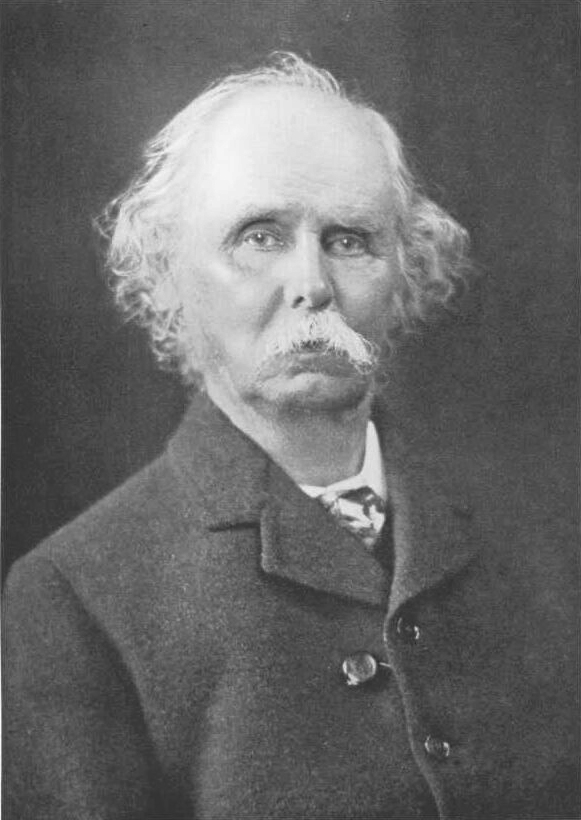
Alfred Marshall (1842–1924) wrote the main alternative textbook to John Stuart Mill of the day, Principles of Economics (1890).

Alfred Marshall (1842–1924) is also credited with an attempt to put economics on a more mathematical footing. The first professor of economics at the University of Cambridge, his 1890 work Principles of Economics abandoned the term "political economy" for his favorite "economics". He viewed math as a way to simplify economic reasoning, although he had reservations as revealed in a letter to his student Arthur Cecil Pigou:

(1) Use mathematics as shorthand language, rather than as an engine of inquiry. (2) Keep to them till you have done. (3) Translate into English. (4) Then illustrate by examples that are important in real life. (5) Burn the mathematics. (6) If you can't succeed in 4, burn 3. This I do often.

==== New institutional schools ====
In 1972 American economists Harold Demsetz (1930–2019) and Armen Alchian (1914–2013) published Production, Information Costs and Economic Organization, founding New Institutional Economics, an updating of the works of Ronald Coase (1910–2013) with mainstream economics.

=== Continental neoclassical ===
==== Lausanne School ====
The Lausanne School is named after University of Lausanne where Léon Walras and Vilfredo Pareto held professorships.

In 1874 working independently, French economist Léon Walras (1834–1910) generalized marginal theory across the economy in Elements of Pure Economics: Small changes in people's preferences, for instance shifting from beef to mushrooms, would lead to a mushroom price rise, and beef price fall; this stimulates producers to shift production, increasing mushrooming investment, which would increase market supply and a new price equilibrium between the products, e.g. lowering the price of mushrooms to a level between the two first levels. For many products across the economy the same would happen if one assumes markets are competitive, people choose on the basis of self-interest, and there is no cost for shifting production.

Similar to Walras, Vilfredo Pareto tried to sketch the mathematical description of economics in analogy to mechanics, explicitly linking pure (and applied) economics to pure (and applied) mechanics. Similar approaches were put forward by Irving Fisher in the United States in his 1892 dissertation.

==== The Austrian school of economics ====
While economics at the end of the nineteenth century and the beginning of the twentieth was dominated increasingly by mathematical analysis, the followers of Carl Menger (1840–1921) and his disciples Eugen von Böhm-Bawerk (1851–1914) and Friedrich von Wieser (1851–1926) (coiner of the term "marginal utility") followed a different route, advocating the use of deductive logic instead. This group became known as the Austrian School of Economics, reflecting the Austrian origin of many of the early adherents. Thorstein Veblen in The Preconceptions of Economic Science (1900) contrasted neoclassical marginalists in the tradition of Alfred Marshall with the philosophies of the Austrian School.

===== Carl Menger =====
In 1871 Austrian School economist Carl Menger (1840–1921) restated the basic principles of marginal utility in Grundsätze der Volkswirtschaftslehre (Principles of Economics): Consumers act rationally by seeking to maximize satisfaction of all their preferences; people allocate their spending so that the last unit of a commodity bought creates no more satisfaction than a last unit bought of something else.

==== Francis Ysidro Edgeworth ====
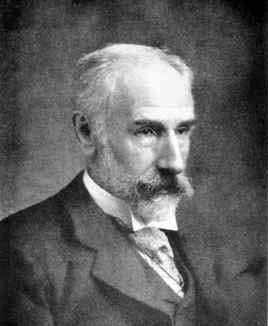
Francis Ysidro Edgeworth (1845–1926)

In 1881 Irish economist Francis Ysidro Edgeworth (1845–1926) published Mathematical Psychics: An Essay on the Application of Mathematics to the Moral Sciences, which introduced indifference curves and the generalized utility function, along with Edgeworth's Limit Theorem, extending the Bertrand Model to handle capacity constraints, and proposing Edgeworth's Paradox for when there is no limit to what the firms can sell.

==== Friedrich Hayek ====
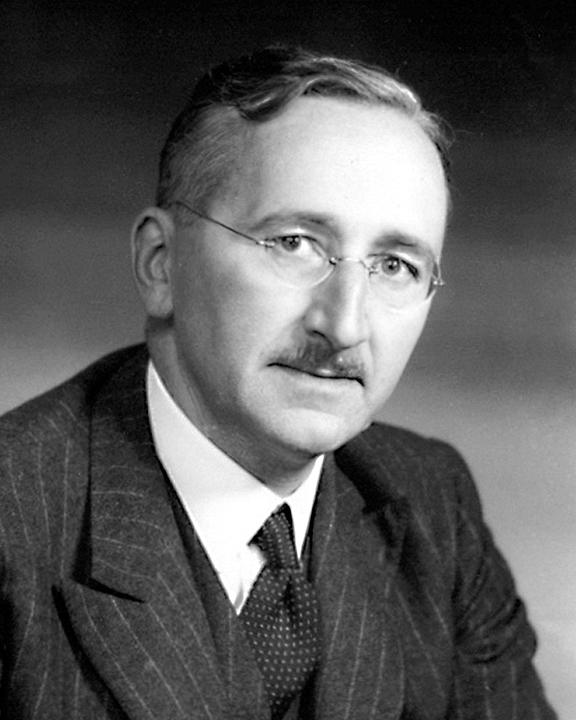
Friedrich Hayek (1899–1992)

In echoes of Smith's "system of natural liberty", Hayek argued that the market is a "spontaneous order" and actively disparaged the concept of "social justice". Ludwig von Mises's outspoken criticisms of socialism had a large influence on the economic thinking of Austrian School economist Friedrich Hayek (1899–1992), who, while initially sympathetic, became one of the leading academic critics of collectivism in the 20th century. Hayek believed that all forms of collectivism (even those theoretically based on voluntary cooperation) could only be maintained by a central authority. But he argued that centralizing economic decision-making would lead not only to infringements of liberty but also to depressed standards of living because centralized experts could not gather and assess the knowledge required to allocate scarce resources efficiently or productively. In his book, The Road to Serfdom (1944) and in subsequent works, Hayek claimed that socialism required central economic planning and that such planning in turn would lead towards totalitarianism. Hayek attributed the birth of civilization to private property in his book The Fatal Conceit (1988). According to him, price signals are the only means of enabling each economic decision maker to communicate tacit knowledge or dispersed knowledge to each other, to solve the economic calculation problem. Along with his Socialist Swedish contemporary and opponent Gunnar Myrdal (1898–1987), Hayek was awarded the Nobel Prize in Economics in 1974.

== Alternative schools (19th century) ==
=== Business cycle theory ===
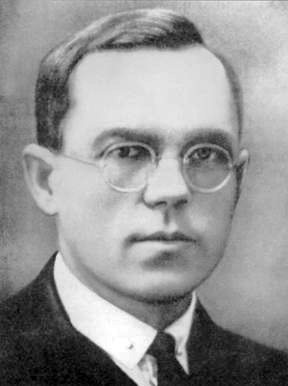
Nikolai Kondratiev (1892–1938)

In the early 19th century German-born English astronomer Sir William Herschel (1738–1822) noted a connection between 11-year sunspot cycles and wheat prices. In 1860 French economist Clément Juglar (1819–1905) posited business cycles seven to eleven years long. In 1925 the Soviet economist Nikolai Kondratiev (1892–1938) proposed the existence of Kondratiev waves in Western capitalist economies fifty to sixty years long.

=== German historical school of economics ===
In the mid-1840s German economist Wilhelm Roscher (1817–1894) founded the German historical school of economics, which promoted the cyclical theory of nations—economies passing through youth, manhood, and senility—and spread through academia in Britain and the U.S., dominating it for the rest of the 19th century.

=== Thorstein Veblen and the American Way ===
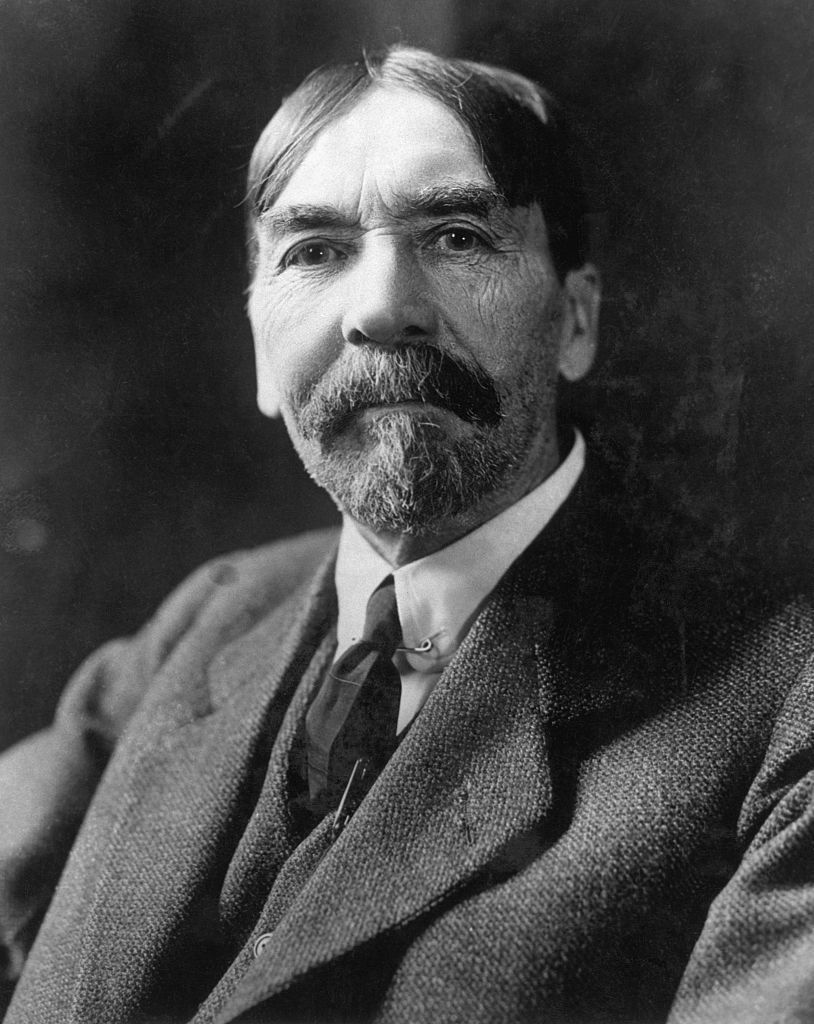
Thorstein Veblen (1857–1929)

Thorstein Veblen (1857–1929), who came from rural midwestern America and worked at the University of Chicago is one of the best-known early critics of the "American Way". In The Theory of the Leisure Class (1899) he scorned materialistic culture and wealthy people who conspicuously consumed their riches as a way of demonstrating success. In The Theory of Business Enterprise (1904) Veblen distinguished production for people to use things and production for pure profit, arguing that the former is often hindered because businesses pursue the latter. Output and technological advance are restricted by business practices and the creation of monopolies. Businesses protect their existing capital investments and employ excessive credit, leading to depressions and increasing military expenditure and war through business control of political power. These two books, focusing on criticism of consumerism and profiteering did not advocate change. However, in 1918 he moved to New York to begin work as an editor of a magazine called The Dial, and then in 1919, along with Charles A. Beard, James Harvey Robinson, and John Dewey he helped found the New School for Social Research (known today as The New School). He was also part of the Technical Alliance, created in 1919 by Howard Scott. From 1919 through 1926 Veblen continued to write and to be involved in various activities at The New School. During this period he wrote The Engineers and the Price System (1921).

== The World Wars, Russian and German Revolutions, and Great Depression (early to mid 20th century) ==
At the outbreak of World War I (1914 –1918), Alfred Marshall was still working on his last revisions of his Principles of Economics. The 20th century's initial climate of optimism was soon violently dismembered in the trenches of the Western Front. During the war, production in Britain, Germany, and France was switched to the military. In 1917 Russia crumbled into revolution led by Vladimir Lenin who promoted Marxist theory and collectivized the means of production. Also in 1917, the United States of America entered the war on the side of the Allies (France and Britain), with President Woodrow Wilson claiming to be "making the world safe for democracy", devising a peace plan of Fourteen Points. In 1918 Germany launched a spring offensive which failed, and as the allies counterattacked and more millions were slaughtered, Germany slid into the German Revolution, its interim government suing for peace on the basis of Wilson's Fourteen Points. After the war, Europe lay in ruins, financially, physically, psychologically, and its future was dependent on the dictates of the Versailles Conference in 1919.

The war economy of Austria-Hungary during WWI would serve as the foundation of the essay by Ludwig von Mises titled Economic Calculation in the Socialist Commonwealth (Die Wirtschaftsrechnung im sozialistischen Gemeinwesen) delivered as a lecture to the Society for National Economy (Nationalökonomische Gesellschaft) in 1919, and published in 1920. In this essay Mises critiques planned economies as a rejection of the price mechanism, and describes how rational and efficient allocation of resources is only possible through market forces reflecting the subjective values of resources in each given time and place. The economic calculation problem reframed socialism, like the planned economy of a wartime empire, as a technical problem rather than a moral or political one. While its reception at the time may have been lukewarm, it would go on to serve as the backbone of many of the works of F. A. Hayek, and debate surrounding it would be pivotal in the Austrian revival that surrounded Hayek's 1974 Nobel Prize.

After World War I, Europe and the Soviet Union lay in ruins, and the British Empire was nearing its end, leaving the United States as the preeminent global economic power. Before World War II, American economists had played a minor role. During this time institutional economists had been largely critical of the "American Way" of life, especially the conspicuous consumption of the Roaring Twenties before the Wall Street crash of 1929. The most important development in economic thought during the Great Depression was the Keynesian revolution, including the publication in 1936 of The General Theory of Employment, Interest, and Money by John Maynard Keynes. (See the discussion of Keynesianism below.) Subsequently, a more orthodox body of thought took root, reacting against the lucid debating style of Keynes, and remathematizing the profession. The orthodox center was also challenged by a more radical group of scholars based at the University of Chicago, who advocated "liberty" and "freedom", looking back to 19th century-style non-interventionist governments.

=== Econometrics ===
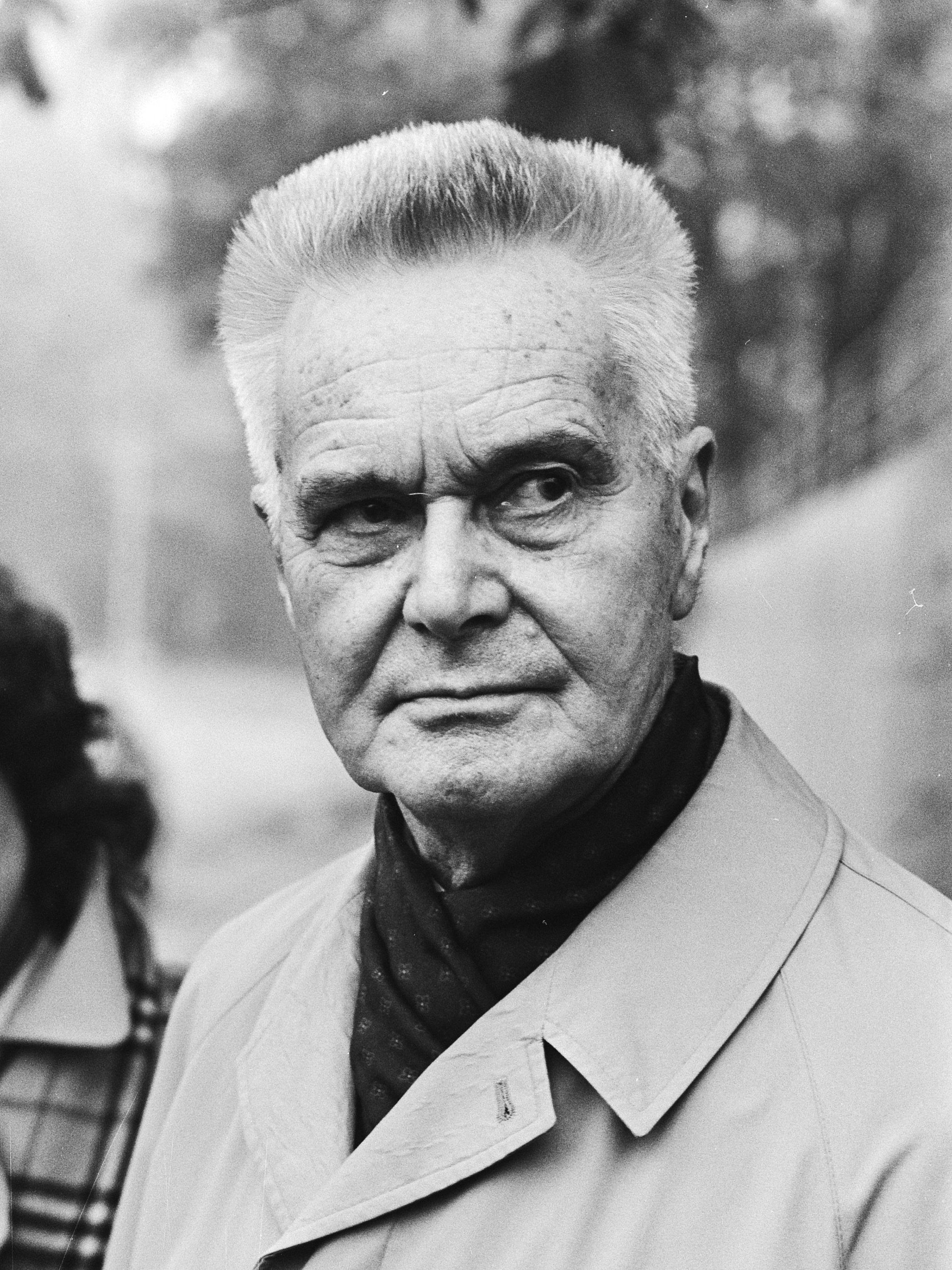
Jan Tinbergen (1903–1994)

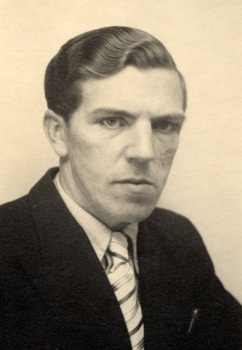
Trygve Haavelmo (1911–1999)

In the 1930s Norwegian economist Ragnar Frisch (1895–1973) and Dutch economist Jan Tinbergen (1903–1994) pioneered Econometrics, receiving the first-ever Nobel Prize in Economics in 1969. In 1936 Russian-American economist Wassily Leontief (1905–1999) proposed the Input-Output Model of economics, which uses linear algebra and is ideally suited to computers, receiving the 1973 Nobel Economics Prize. After World War II, Lawrence Klein (1920–2013) pioneered the use of computers in econometric modeling, receiving the 1980 Nobel Economics Prize. In 1963–1964 as John Tukey of Princeton University was developing the revolutionary fast Fourier transform, which greatly speed up the calculation of Fourier Transforms, his British assistant Sir Clive Granger (1934–2009) pioneered the use of Fourier Transforms in economics, receiving the 2003 Nobel Economics Prize. Ragnar Frisch's assistant Trygve Haavelmo (1911–1999) received the 1989 Nobel Economics Prize for clarifying the probability foundations of econometrics and for analysis of simultaneous economic structures.

=== Means and corporate governance ===
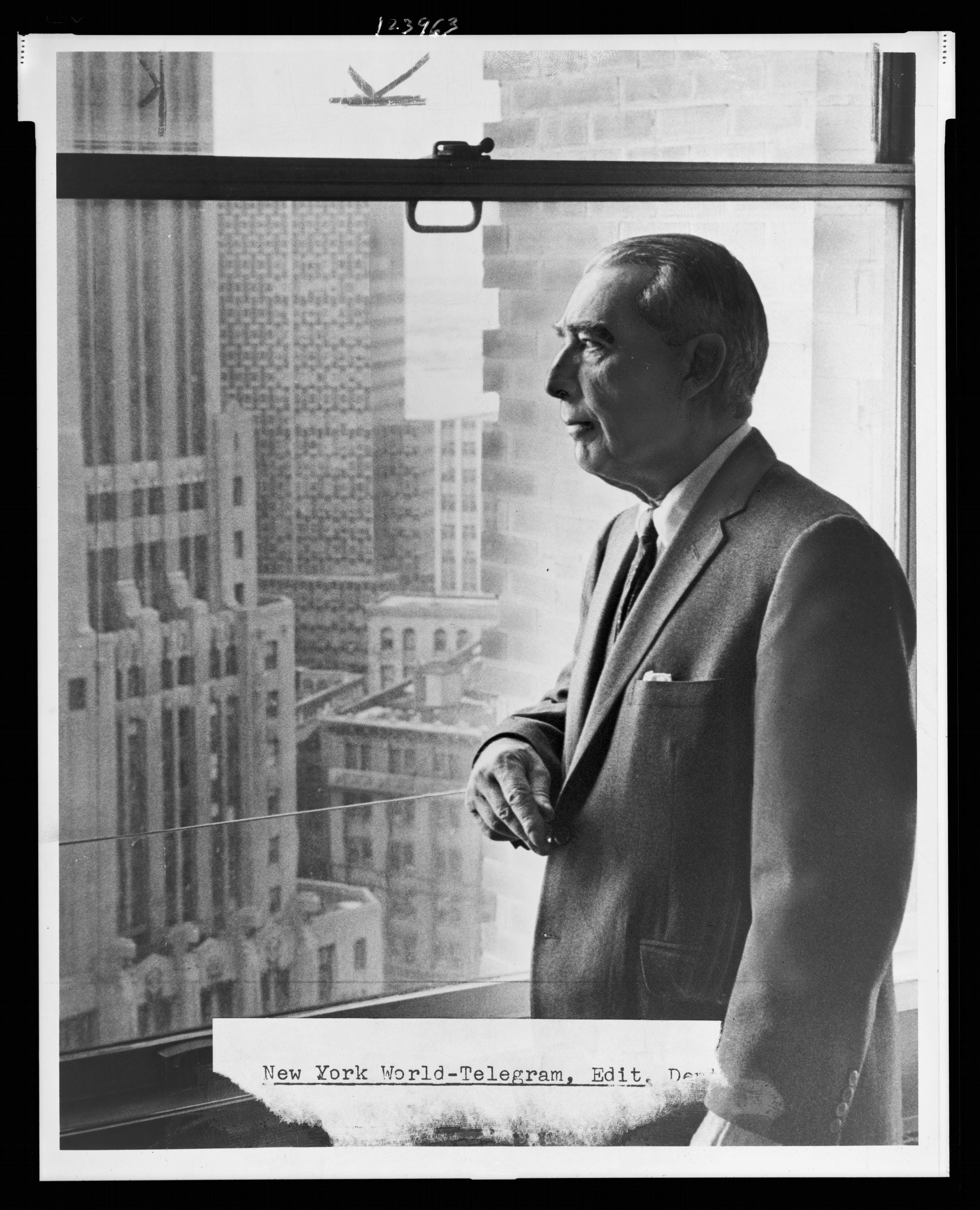
Adolf Augustus Berle, Jr. (1895–1971) with Gardiner Means was a foundational figure of modern corporate governance.

The Great Depression was a time of significant upheaval in the world economy. One of the most original contributions to understanding what went wrong came from Harvard University lawyer Adolf Berle (1895–1971), who like John Maynard Keynes had resigned from his diplomatic job at the Paris Peace Conference, 1919 and was deeply disillusioned by the Versailles Treaty. In his book with American economist Gardiner C. Means (1896–1988) The Modern Corporation and Private Property (1932) he detailed the evolution in the contemporary economy of big business and argued that those who controlled big firms should be better held to account. Directors of companies are held to account to the shareholders of companies, or not, by the rules found in company law statutes. This might include rights to elect and fire the management, requirements to hold regular general meetings, satisfy accounting standards, and so on. In 1930s America the typical company laws (e.g. in Delaware) did not clearly mandate such rights. Berle argued that the unaccountable directors of companies were therefore apt to funnel the fruits of enterprise profits into their own pockets, as well as manage in their own interests. The ability to do this was supported by the fact that the majority of shareholders in big public companies were single individuals, with scant means of communication, in short, divided and conquered. Berle served in President Franklin Delano Roosevelt's administration through the Great Depression as a key member of his Brain Trust, developing many New Deal policies.

In 1967 Berle and Means issued a revised edition of their work, in which the preface added a new dimension. It was not only the separation of controllers of companies from the owners as shareholders at stake. They posed the question of what the corporate structure was really meant to achieve:

"Stockholders toil not, neither do they spin, to earn [dividends and share price increases]. They are beneficiaries by position only. Justification for their inheritance... can be founded only upon social grounds... that justification turns on the distribution as well as the existence of wealth. Its force exists only in direct ratio to the number of individuals who hold such wealth. Justification for the stockholder's existence thus depends on increasing distribution within the American population. Ideally, the stockholder's position will be impregnable only when every American family has its fragment of that position and of the wealth by which the opportunity to develop individuality becomes fully actualized."

=== Industrial organization economics ===
In 1933 American economist Edward Chamberlin (1899–1967) published The Theory of Monopolistic Competition. The same year British economist Joan Robinson (1903–1983) published The Economics of Imperfect Competition. Together they founded Industrial Organization Economics. Chamberlin also founded Experimental Economics.

=== Linear programming ===
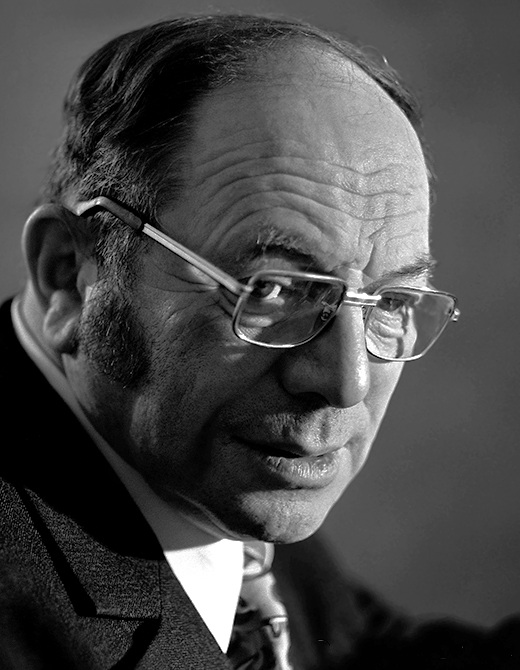
Leonid Kantorovich (1912–1986)

In 1939 Russian economist Leonid Kantorovich (1912–1986) developed Linear Programming for the optimal allocation of resources, receiving the 1975 Nobel Economics Prize.

=== Ecology and energy ===
By the twentieth century, the Industrial Revolution had led to an exponential increase in the human consumption of resources. The increase in health, wealth and population was perceived as a simple path of progress. However, in the 1930s economists began developing models of non-renewable resource management (see Hotelling's rule) and the sustainability of welfare in an economy that uses non-renewable resources.

Concerns about the environmental and social impacts of industry had been expressed by some Enlightenment political economists and in the Romantic movement of the 1800s. Overpopulation had been discussed in an essay by Thomas Malthus (see Malthusian catastrophe), while John Stuart Mill foresaw the desirability of a stationary state economy, thus anticipating concerns of the modern discipline of ecological economics.

==== Ecological economics ====
Ecological economics was founded in the works of Kenneth E. Boulding, Nicholas Georgescu-Roegen, Herman Daly and others. The disciplinary field of ecological economics also bears some similarity to the topic of green economics.

According to ecological economist Malte Faber, ecological economics is defined by its focus on nature, justice, and time. Issues of intergenerational equity, irreversibility of human impact on the environment, uncertainty of long-term outcomes, thermodynamics limits to growth, and sustainable development guide ecological economic analysis and valuation.

==== Energy accounting ====
Energy accounting was proposed in the early 1930s as a scientific alternative to a price system, or money method of regulating society. Joseph Tainter suggests that a diminishing ratio of energy returned on energy invested is a chief cause of the collapse of complex societies. Falling EROEI due to the depletion of non-renewable resources also poses a difficult challenge for industrial economies. Sustainability becomes an issue as survival is threatened due to climate change.

=== Institutional economics ===
In 1919 Yale economist Walton H. Hamilton coined the term "Institutional economics". In 1934 John R. Commons (1862–1945), another economist from midwestern America published Institutional Economics (1934), based on the concept that the economy is a web of relationships between people with diverging interests, including monopolies, large corporations, labor disputes, and fluctuating business cycles. They do however have an interest in resolving these disputes. Government, thought Commons, ought to be the mediator between the conflicting groups. Commons himself devoted much of his time to advisory and mediation work on government boards and industrial commissions.

=== Arthur Cecil Pigou ===
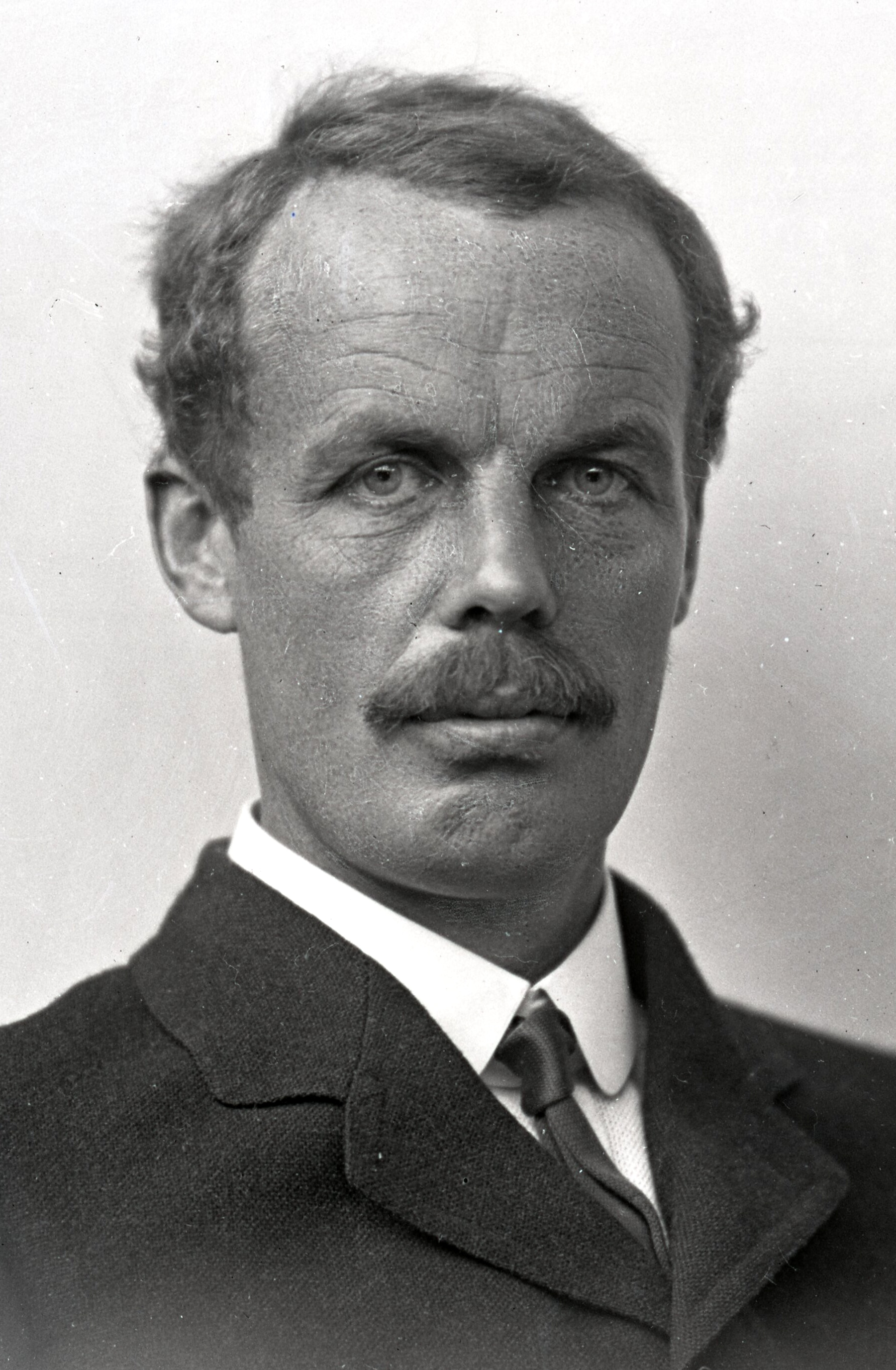
Arthur Cecil Pigou (1877–1959)

In 1920 Alfred Marshall's student Arthur Cecil Pigou (1877–1959) published Wealth and Welfare, which insisted on the possibility of market failures, claiming that markets are inefficient in the case of economic externalities, and the state must interfere to prevent them. However, Pigou retained free market beliefs, and in 1933, in the face of the economic crisis, he explained in The Theory of Unemployment that the excessive intervention of the state in the labor market was the real cause of massive unemployment because the governments had established a minimal wage, which prevented wages from adjusting automatically. This was to be the focus of attack from Keynes. In 1943 Pigou published the paper The Classical Stationary State, which popularized the Pigou (Real Balance) Effect, the stimulation of output and employment during deflation by increasing consumption due to a rise in wealth.

=== Market socialism ===
In response to the Economic Calculation Problem proposed by the Austrian School of Economics that disputes the efficiency of a state-run economy, the theory of Market Socialism was developed in the late 1920s and 1930s by economists Fred M. Taylor (1855–1932), Oskar R. Lange (1904–1965), Abba Lerner (1903–1982) et al., combining Marxian economics with neoclassical economics after dumping the labor theory of value. In 1938 Abram Bergson (1914–2003) defined the Social Welfare Function.

=== The Stockholm school of economics ===
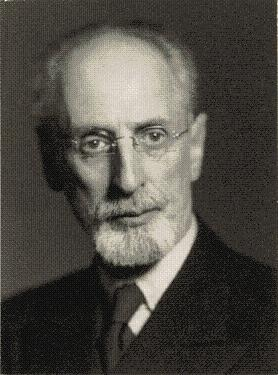
Eli Heckscher (1879–1952)

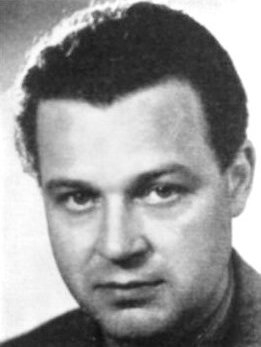
Gunnar Myrdal (1898–1987)

In the 1930s the Stockholm School of Economics was founded by Eli Heckscher (1879–1952), Bertil Ohlin (1899–1977), Gunnar Myrdal (1898–1987) et al. based on the works of John Maynard Keynes and Knut Wicksell (1851–1926), advising the founders of the Swedish Socialist welfare state.

In 1933 Ohlin and Heckscher proposed the Heckscher-Ohlin Model of International Trade, which claims that countries will export products that use their abundant and cheap factors of production and import products that use their scarce factors of production. In 1977 Ohlin was awarded a share of the Nobel Economics Prize.

In 1957 Myrdal published his theory of Circular Cumulative Causation, in which a change in one institution ripples through others. In 1974 he received a share of the Nobel Economics Prize.

=== French Regulation school ===
This school includes economists like Michel Aglietta (1938), André Orléan (1950), Robert Boyer (1943), Benjamin Coriat (1948) and Alain Lipietz (1947). It is one of the two heterodox schools in France, the other being l'école des conventions. Their interests revolves around accounting for the regime of regulation of specific historic stage of capitalism. They have mainly analysed the fordist mode of regulation, who corresponds to the after war period. Production as organised scientifically and products were not diversified. This corresponds with a homogenous consumption of goods. The economy was production led, where firms first produce the optimal amount of a type of good in the cheapest manner possible, destined to be mass consumed. Their inquiry consists of explaining how a stable mode of regulation can emerge in a capitalist economy, which inherently contains crises. Whereas orthodox economists tend to explain the causes of crises and disequilibriums in a supposedly self-regulating economy.

=== The American Economic Association ===
In 1885 the American Economic Association (AEA) was founded by Richard T. Ely (1854–1943) et al., publishing the American Economic Review starting in 1911. In 1918 Ely published Private Colonization of Land, founding Lambda Alpha International in 1930 to promote Land Economics.

== Keynesianism (20th century) ==
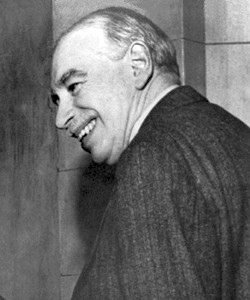
John Maynard Keynes (1883–1946) at the Bretton Woods Conference

John Maynard Keynes (1883–1946) was born in Cambridge, educated at Eton, and supervised by both A. C. Pigou and Alfred Marshall at Cambridge University. He began his career as a lecturer before working for the British government during the Great War, rising to be the British government's financial representative at the Versailles Conference, where he profoundly disagreed with the decisions made. His observations were laid out in his book The Economic Consequences of the Peace (1919), where he documented his outrage at the collapse of American adherence to the Fourteen Points and the mood of vindictiveness that prevailed towards Germany. He resigned from the conference, using extensive economic data provided by the conference records to argue that if the victors forced war reparations to be paid by the defeated Central Powers, then a world financial crisis would ensue, leading to World War II. Keynes finished his treatise by advocating, first, a reduction in reparation payments by Germany to a realistically manageable level, increased intra-governmental management of continental coal production and a free trade union through the League of Nations; second, an arrangement to set off debt repayments between the Allied countries; third, complete reform of international currency exchange and an international loan fund; and fourth, a reconciliation of trade relations with Russia and Eastern Europe.

The book was an enormous success, and though it was criticized for false predictions by a number of people, without the changes he advocated, Keynes's dark forecasts matched the world's experience through the Great Depression which began in 1929, and the descent into World War II in 1939. World War I had been touted as the "war to end all wars", and the absolute failure of the peace settlement generated an even greater determination to not repeat the same mistakes. With the defeat of Fascism, the Bretton Woods Conference was held in July 1944 to establish a new economic order, in which Keynes was again to play a leading role.

=== The General Theory ===
During the Great Depression, Keynes published his most important work, The General Theory of Employment, Interest and Money (1936). The Great Depression had been sparked by the Wall Street crash of 1929, leading to massive rises in unemployment in the United States, leading to debts being recalled from European borrowers, and an economic domino effect across the world. Orthodox economics called for a tightening of spending, until business confidence and profit levels could be restored. Keynes by contrast, had argued in A Tract on Monetary Reform (1923) (which argues for a stable currency) that a variety of factors determined economic activity, and that it was not enough to wait for the long run market equilibrium to restore itself. As Keynes famously remarked:

"...this long run is a misleading guide to current affairs. In the long run we are all dead. Economists set themselves too easy, too useless a task if in tempestuous seasons they can only tell us that when the storm is long past the ocean is flat again."

On top of the supply of money, Keynes identified the propensity to consume, inducement to invest, marginal efficiency of capital, liquidity preference, and multiplier effect as variables which determine the level of the economy's output, employment, and price levels. Much of this esoteric terminology was invented by Keynes especially for his General Theory. Keynes argued that if savings were being withheld from investment, total spending falls, leading to reduced incomes and unemployment, which reduces savings again. This continues until the desire to save becomes equal to the desire to invest, which means a new "equilibrium" is reached and the spending decline halts. This new "equilibrium" is a depression, where people are investing less, have less to save and less to spend.

Keynes argued that employment depends on total spending, which is composed of consumer spending and business investment in the private sector. Consumers only spend "passively", or according to their income fluctuations. Businesses, on the other hand, are induced to invest by the expected rate of return on new investments (the benefit) and the rate of interest paid (the cost). So, said Keynes, if business expectations remained the same, and government reduces interest rates (the costs of borrowing), investment would increase, and would have a multiplied effect on total spending. Interest rates, in turn, depend on the quantity of money and the desire to hold money in bank accounts (as opposed to investing). If not enough money is available to match how much people want to hold, interest rates rise until enough people are put off. So if the quantity of money were increased, while the desire to hold money remained stable, interest rates would fall, leading to increased investment, output and employment. For both these reasons, Keynes therefore advocated low interest rates and easy credit, to combat unemployment.

But Keynes believed in the 1930s, conditions necessitated public sector action. Deficit spending, said Keynes, would kick-start economic activity. This he had advocated in an open letter to U.S. President Franklin D. Roosevelt in The New York Times (1933). The New Deal programme in the U.S. had been well underway by the publication of the General Theory. It provided conceptual reinforcement for policies already pursued. Keynes also believed in a more egalitarian distribution of income, and taxation on unearned income arguing that high rates of savings (to which richer folk are prone) are not desirable in a developed economy. Keynes therefore advocated both monetary management and an active fiscal policy.

=== The Cambridge Circus ===
During World War II Keynes acted as adviser to HM Treasury again, negotiating major loans from the U.S., helping formulate the plans for the International Monetary Fund, the World Bank, and the International Trade Organisation at the 1944 Bretton Woods Conference, a package designed to stabilize world economy fluctuations that had occurred in the 1920s and create a level trading field across the globe. Keynes died little more than a year later, but his ideas had already shaped a new global economic order, and all Western governments followed the Keynesian economics program of deficit spending to avert crises and maintain full employment.

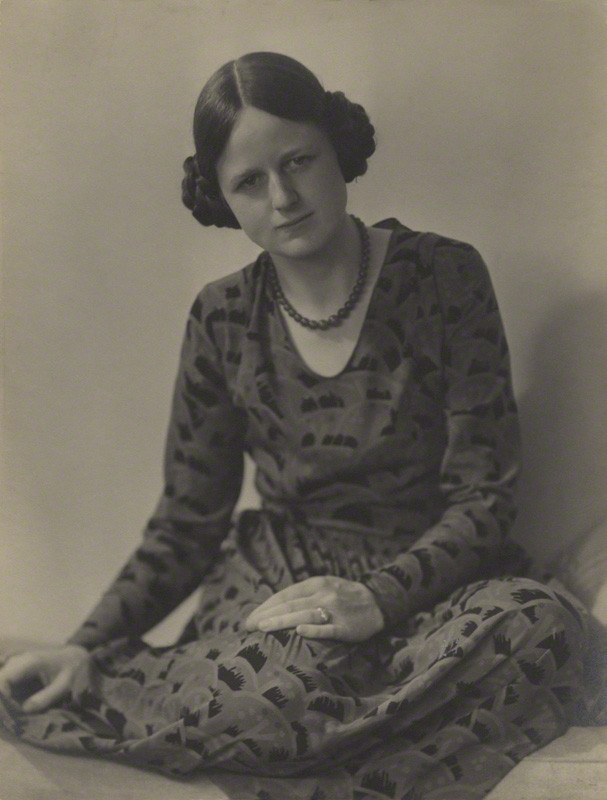
Joan Robinson (1903–1983)

One of Keynes's pupils at Cambridge was Joan Robinson (1903–1983), a member of Keynes's Cambridge Circus, who contributed to the notion that competition is seldom perfect in a market, an indictment of the theory of markets setting prices. In The Production Function and the Theory of Capital (1953) Robinson tackled what she saw to be some of the circularity in orthodox economics. Neoclassicists assert that a competitive market forces producers to minimize the costs of production. Robinson said that costs of production are merely the prices of inputs, like capital. Capital goods get their value from the final products. And if the price of the final products determines the price of capital, then it is, argued Robinson, utterly circular to say that the price of capital determines the price of the final products. Goods cannot be priced until the costs of inputs are determined. This would not matter if everything in the economy happened instantaneously, but in the real world, price setting takes time – goods are priced before they are sold. Since capital cannot be adequately valued in independently measurable units, how can one show that capital earns a return equal to the contribution to production?

Alfred Eichner (1937–1988) was an American post-Keynesian economist who challenged the neoclassical price mechanism and asserted that prices are not set through supply and demand but rather through mark-up pricing. Eichner is one of the founders of the post-Keynesian school of economics and was a professor at Rutgers University at the time of his death. Eichner's writings and advocacy of thought, differed with the theories of John Maynard Keynes, who was an advocate of government intervention in the free market and proponent of public spending to increase employment. Eichner argued that investment was the key to economic expansion. He was considered an advocate of the concept that government incomes policy should prevent inflationary wage and price settlements in connection to the customary fiscal and monetary means of regulating the economy.

Richard Kahn (1905–1989) was a member of the Cambridge Circus who in 1931 proposed the Multiplier.

Piero Sraffa (1898–1983)

Piero Sraffa (1898–1983) came to England from Fascist Italy in the 1920s, and became a member of the Cambridge Circus. In 1960 he published a small book called Production of Commodities by Means of Commodities, which explained how technological relationships are the basis for production of goods and services. Prices result from wage-profit tradeoffs, collective bargaining, labour and management conflict and the intervention of government planning. Like Robinson, Sraffa was showing how the major force for price setting in the economy was not necessarily market adjustments.

John Hicks (1904–1989) of England was a Keynesian who in 1937 proposed the Investment Saving – Liquidity Preference Money Supply Model, which treats the intersection of the IS and LM curves as the general equilibrium in both markets.

=== New Keynesian macroeconomics ===
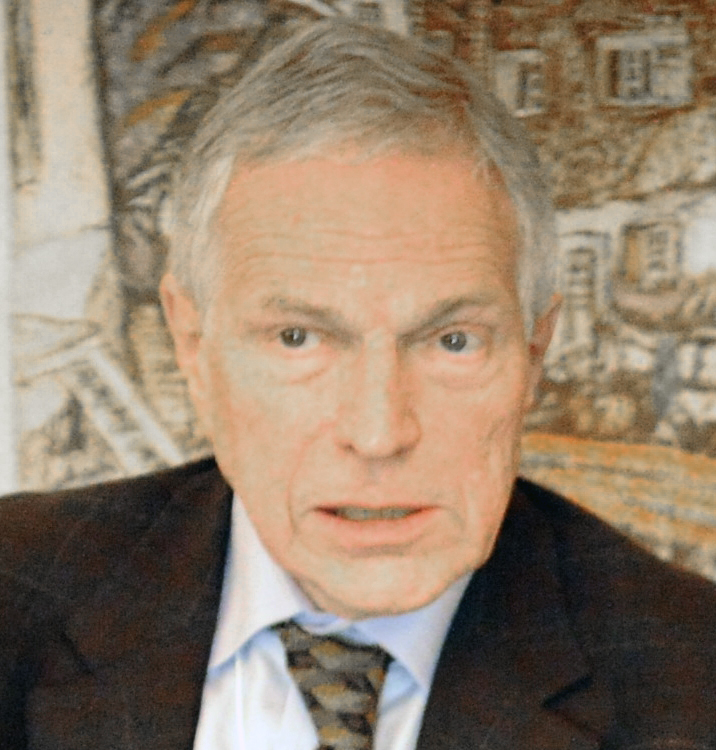
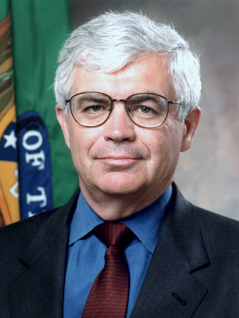
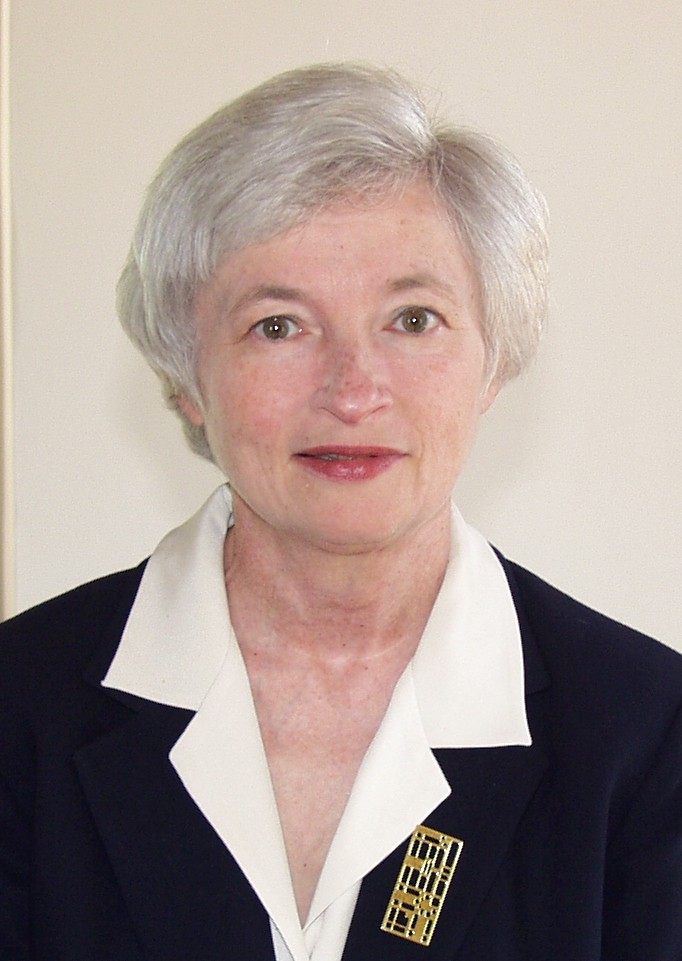
Edmund Phelps, John Taylor, and Janet Yellen

In 1977 Edmund Phelps (1933–) (who was awarded the 2006 Nobel Economics Prize) and John B. Taylor (1946–) published a paper proving that staggered setting of wages and prices gives monetary policy a role in stabilizing economic fluctuations if the wages/prices are sticky, even when all workers and firms have rational expectations, which caused Keynesian economics to make a comeback among mainstream economists with New Keynesian Macroeconomics. Its central theme is the provision of a microeconomic foundation for Keynesian macroeconomics, obtained by identifying minimal deviations from the standard microeconomic assumptions which yield Keynesian macroeconomic conclusions, such as the possibility of significant welfare benefits from macroeconomic stabilization.

In 1985 George Akerlof (1940–) and Janet Yellen (1946–) published menu costs arguments showing that, under imperfect competition, small deviations from rationality generate significant (in welfare terms) price stickiness.

In 1997 American economist Michael Woodford (1955–) and Argentine economist Julio Rotemberg (1953–) published the first paper describing a microfounded DSGE New Keynesian macroeconomic model.

=== Sidney Weintraub, Paul Davidson and Post-Keynesian economics ===
In 1975 American economists Sidney Weintraub (1914–1983) and Henry Wallich (1914–1988) published A Tax-Based Incomes Policy, promoting Tax-Based Incomes Policy (TIP), using the income tax mechanism to implement an anti-inflationary incomes policy. In 1978 Weintraub and American economist Paul Davidson (1930–) founded the Journal of Post Keynesian Economics. This opened the door to many younger economists such as E. Ray Canterbery (1935–). Always Post Keynesian in his style and approach, Canterbery went on to make contributions outside traditional Post Keynesianism. His friend, John Kenneth Galbraith, was a long-time influence.

=== The credit theory of money ===
In 1913 English economist-diplomat Alfred Mitchell-Innes (1864–1950) published What is Money?, which was reviewed favorably by John Maynard Keynes, followed in 1914 by The Credit Theory of Money, advocating the Credit Theory of Money, which economist L. Randall Wray called "The best pair of articles on the nature of money written in the twentieth century."

== Chicago school of economics (20th century) ==
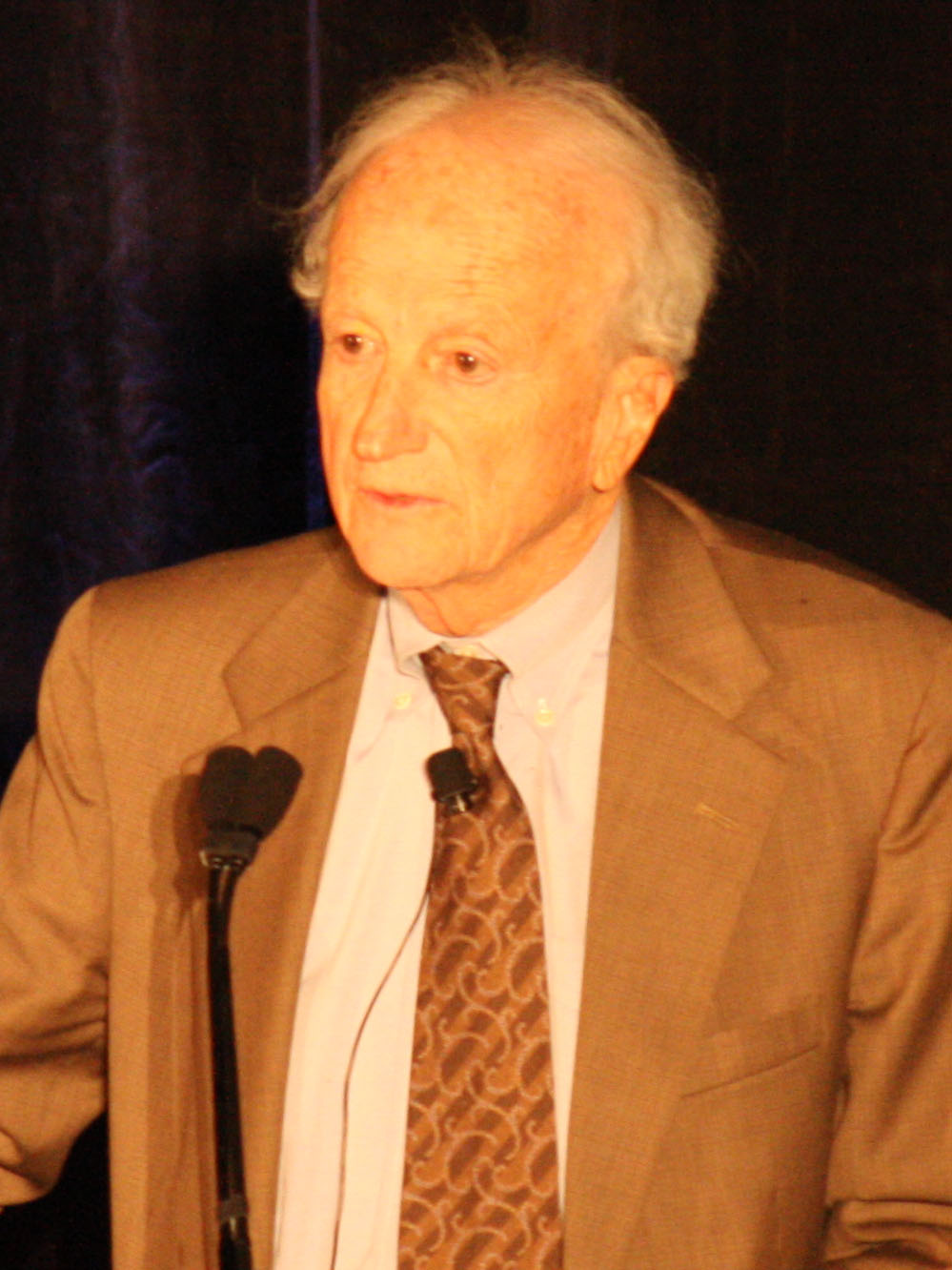
Gary Becker (1930–2014)

The government-interventionist monetary and fiscal policies that the postwar Keynesian economists recommended came under attack by a group of theorists working at the University of Chicago, which came in the 1950s to be known as the Chicago School of Economics. Before World War II, the Old Chicago School of strong Keynesians was founded by Frank Knight (1885–1972), Jacob Viner (1892–1970), and Henry Calvert Simons (1899–1946). The second generation was known for a more conservative line of thought, reasserting a libertarian view of market activity that people are best left to themselves to be free to choose how to conduct their own affairs.

Ronald Coase (1910–2013) of the Chicago School of Economics was the most prominent economic analyst of law, and the 1991 Nobel Prize in Economics winner. His first major article The Nature of the Firm (1937) argued that the reason for the existence of firms (companies, partnerships, etc.) is the existence of transaction costs. Homo economicus trades through bilateral contracts on open markets until the costs of transactions make the use of corporations to produce things more cost-effective. His second major article The Problem of Social Cost (1960) argued that if we lived in a world without transaction costs, people would bargain with one another to create the same allocation of resources, regardless of the way a court might rule in property disputes. Coase used the example of an old legal case about nuisance named Sturges v Bridgman, where a noisy sweets maker and a quiet doctor were neighbors and went to court to see who should have to move. Coase said that regardless of whether the judge ruled that the sweets maker had to stop using his machinery, or that the doctor had to put up with it, they could strike a mutually beneficial bargain about who moves house that reaches the same outcome of resource distribution. Only the existence of transaction costs may prevent this. So the law ought to preempt what would happen, and be guided by the most efficient solution. The idea is that law and regulation are not as important or effective at helping people as lawyers and government planners believe. Coase and others like him wanted a change of approach, to put the burden of proof for positive effects on a government that was intervening in the market, by analyzing the costs of action.

In the 1960s Gary Becker (1930–2014) and Jacob Mincer (1922–2006) of the Chicago School of Economics founded New Home Economics, which spawned Family Economics.

In 1973 Coase disciple Richard Posner (1939–) published Economic Analysis of Law, which became a standard textbook, causing him to become the most cited legal scholar of the 20th century. In 1981 he published The Economics of Justice, which claimed that judges have been interpreting common law as it they were trying to maximize economic welfare.

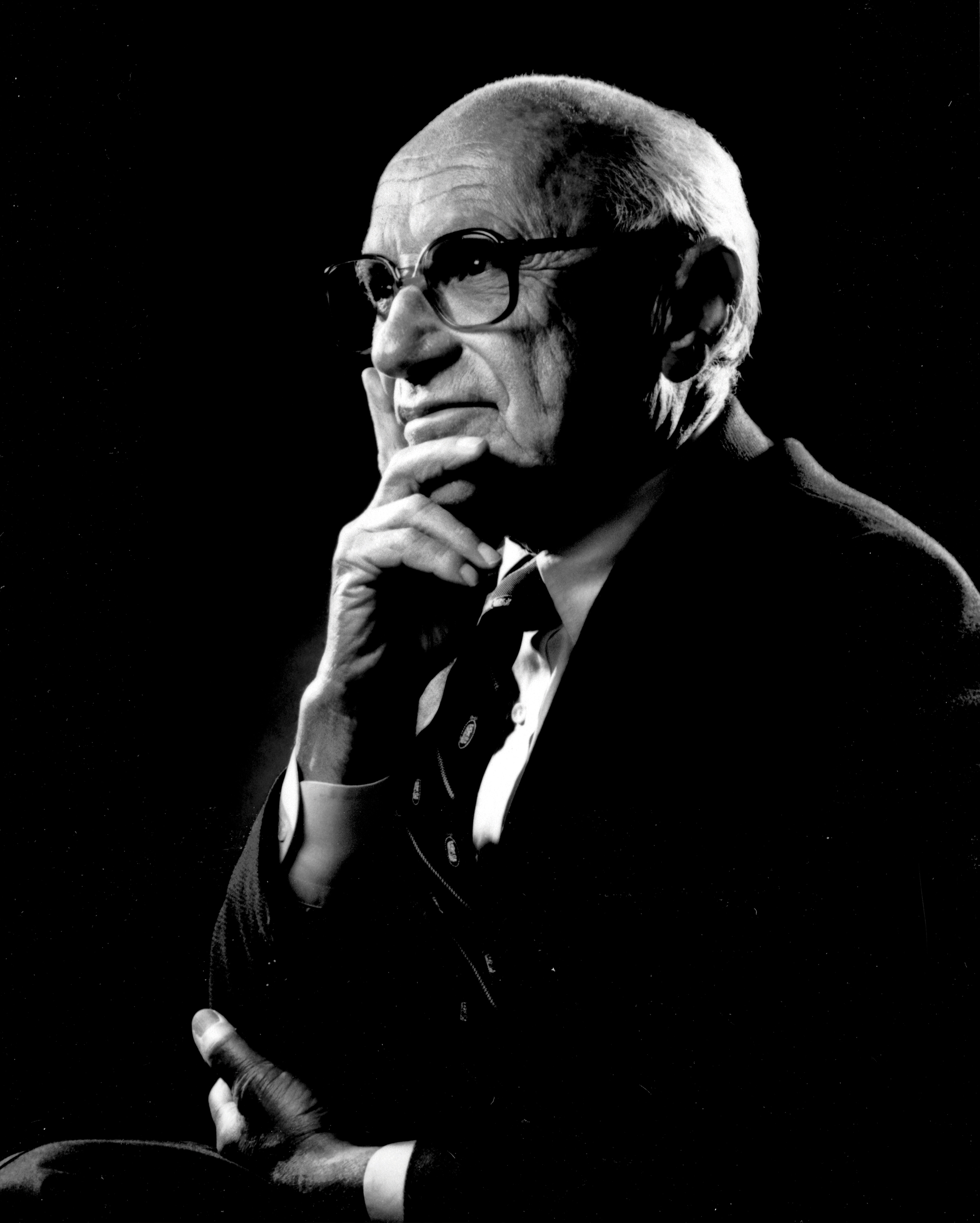
Milton Friedman (1912–2006)

Milton Friedman (1912–2006) of the Chicago School of Economics is one of the most influential economists of the late 20th century, receiving the Nobel Prize in Economics in 1976. He is known for A Monetary History of the United States (1963), in which he argued that the Great Depression was caused by the policies of the Federal Reserve. Friedman argues that laissez-faire government policy is more desirable than government intervention in the economy and that governments should aim for a neutral monetary policy oriented toward long-run economic growth, by gradual expansion of the money supply. He advocates the quantity theory of money, that general prices are determined by money. Therefore, active monetary (e.g. easy credit) or fiscal (e.g. tax and spend) policy can have unintended negative effects. In Capitalism and Freedom (1962), Friedman wrote:

"There is likely to be a lag between the need for action and government recognition of the need; a further lag between recognition of the need for action and the taking of action; and a still further lag between the action and its effects."

Friedman was also known for his work on the consumption function, the Permanent Income Hypothesis (1957), which Friedman referred to as his best scientific work. This work contended that rational consumers would spend a proportional amount of what they perceived to be their permanent income. Windfall gains would mostly be saved. Tax reductions likewise, as rational consumers would predict that taxes would have to rise later to balance public finances. Other important contributions include his critique of the Phillips Curve, and the concept of the natural rate of unemployment (1968).

=== New classical macroeconomics and synthesis ===
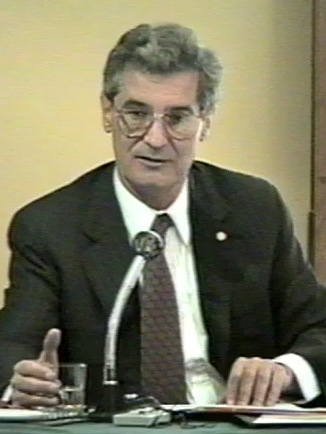
Robert Lucas giving a lecture in 1996

In the early 1970s American Chicago School economist Robert E. Lucas, Jr. (1937–) founded New Classical Macroeconomics based on Milton Friedman's monetarist critique of Keynesian macroeconomics, and the idea of rational expectations, first proposed in 1961 by John F. Muth, opposing the idea that government intervention can or should stabilize the economy. The Policy-Ineffectiveness Proposition (1975) of Thomas J. Sargent (1943–) and Neil Wallace (1939–), which seemed to refute a basic assumption of Keynesian economics was also adopted. The Lucas aggregate supply function states that economic output is a function of money or price "surprise." Lucas was awarded the 1995 Nobel Economics Prize.

Lucas' model was superseded as the standard model of New Classical Macroeconomics by the Real Business Cycle Theory, proposed in 1982 by Finn Kydland (1943–) and Edward C. Prescott (1940–), which seeks to explain observed fluctuations in output and employment in terms of real variables such as changes in technology and tastes. Assuming competitive markets, real business cycle theory implies that cyclical fluctuations are optimal responses to variability in technology and tastes, and that macroeconomic stabilization policies must reduce welfare.

In 1982 Kydland and Prescott also founded the theory of Dynamic Stochastic General Equilibrium (DSGE), large systems of microeconomic equations combined into models of the general economy, which became central to the New Neoclassical Synthesis, incorporating theoretical elements such as sticky prices from New Keynesian Macroeconomics. They shared the 2004 Nobel Economics Prize.

=== Efficient market hypothesis ===
In 1965 Chicago School economist Eugene Fama (1939–) published The Behavior of Stock Market Prices, which found that stock market prices follow a random walk, proposing the Efficient Market Hypothesis, that randomness is characteristic of a perfectly functioning financial market. The same year Paul Samuelson published a paper concluding the same thing with a mathematical proof, sharing the credit. Earlier in 1948 Holbrook Working (1895–1985) published a paper saying the same thing, but not in a mathematical form. In 1970 Fama published Efficient Capital Markets: A Review of Theory and Empirical Work, proposing that efficient markets can be strong, semi-strong, or weak, and also proposing the Joint Hypothesis Problem, that the idea of market efficiency can not be rejected without also rejecting the market mechanism.

== Games, evolution and growth (20th century) ==
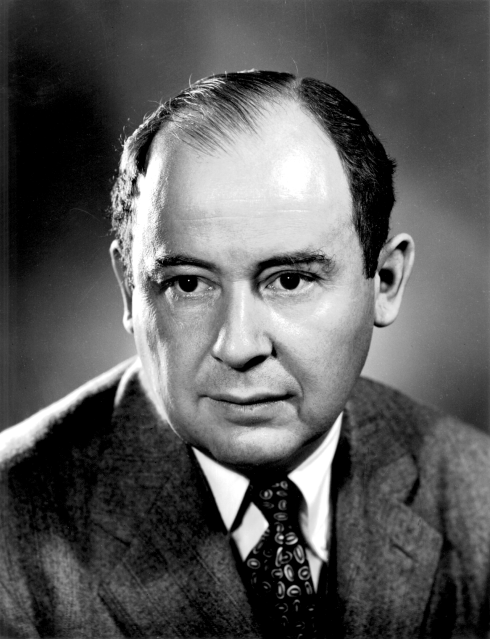
John von Neumann (1903–1957)

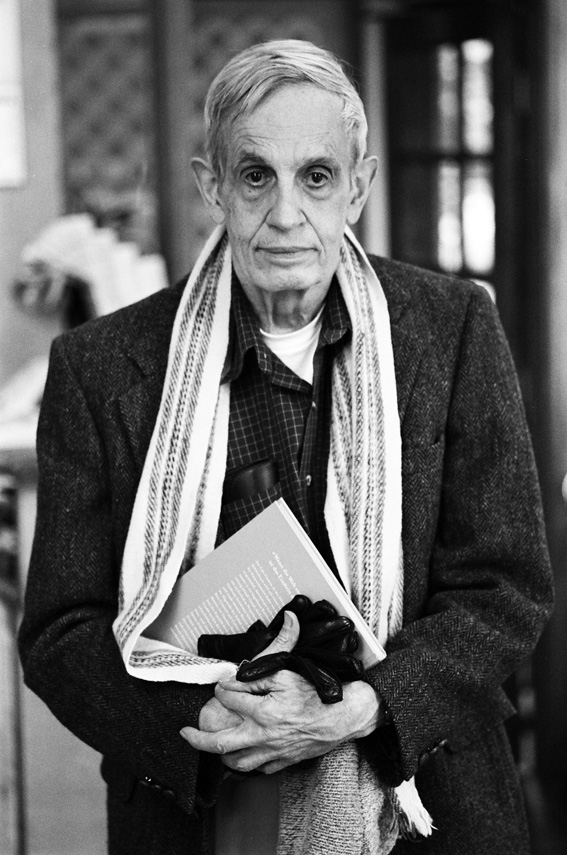
John Forbes Nash Jr. (1928–2015)

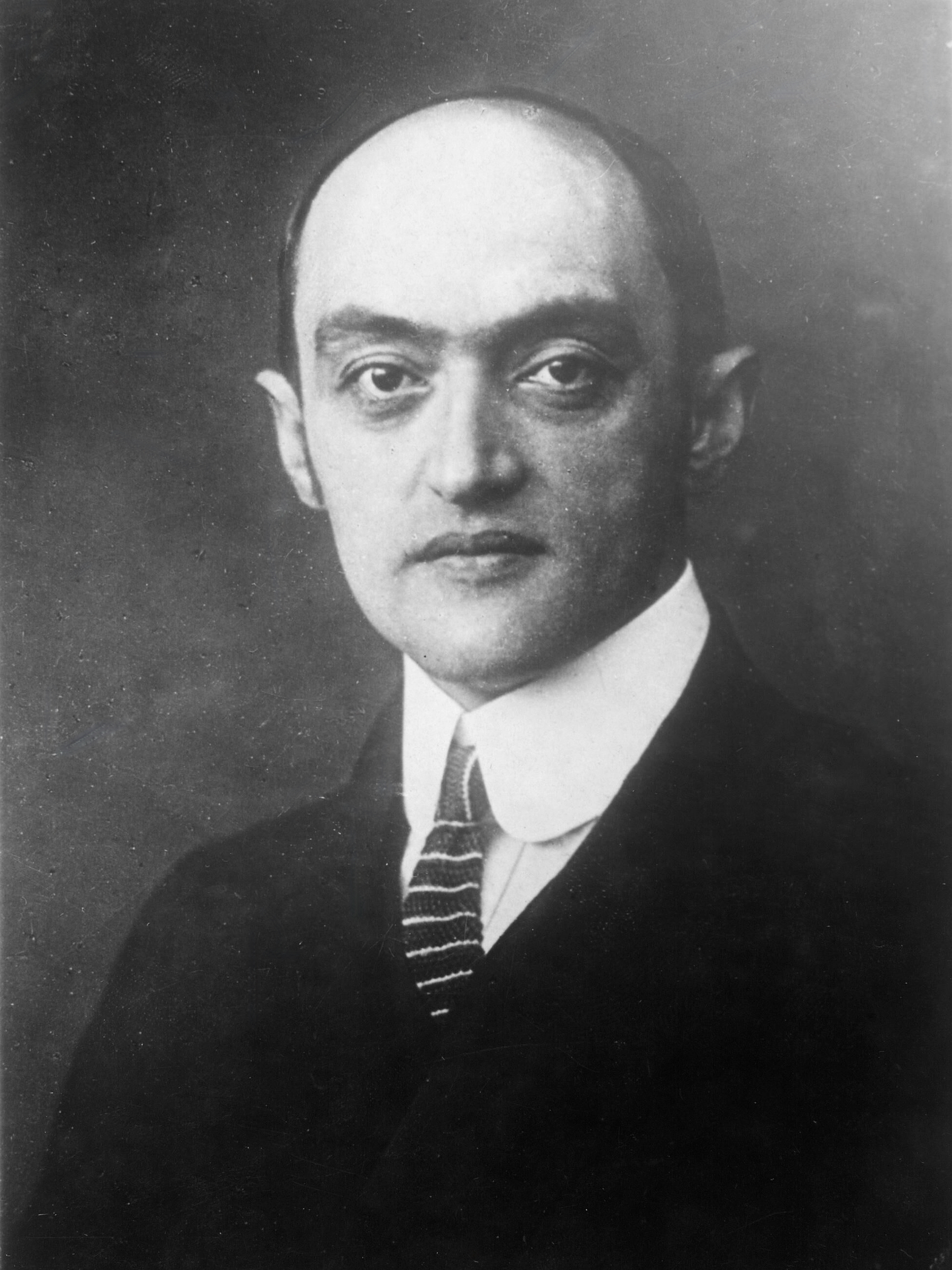
Joseph Alois Schumpeter (1883–1950)

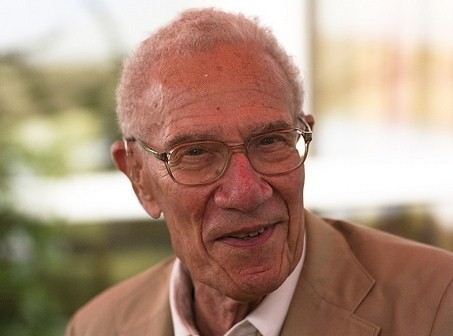
Robert Solow (1924–2023)

In 1898 Thorstein Veblen published Why is Economics not an Evolutionary Science, which coins the term Evolutionary economics, making use of anthropology to deny that there is a universal human nature, emphasizing the conflict between "industrial" or instrumental and "pecuniary" or ceremonial values, which became known as the Ceremonial/Instrumental Dichotomy.

Joseph Alois Schumpeter (1883–1950) was an Austrian School economist and political scientist best known for his works on business cycles and innovation. He insisted on the role of the entrepreneurs in an economy. In Business Cycles: A theoretical, historical and statistical analysis of the Capitalist process (1939), Schumpeter synthesized the theories about business cycles, suggesting that they could explain the economic situations. According to Schumpeter, capitalism necessarily goes through long-term cycles because it is entirely based upon scientific inventions and innovations. A phase of expansion is made possible by innovations, because they bring productivity gains and encourage entrepreneurs to invest. However, when investors have no more opportunities to invest, the economy goes into recession, several firms collapse, closures and bankruptcy occur. This phase lasts until new innovations bring a creative destruction process, i.e. they destroy old products, reduce the employment, but they allow the economy to start a new phase of growth, based upon new products and new factors of production.

In 1944 Hungarian-American mathematician John von Neumann and Oskar Morgenstern published Theory of Games and Economic Behavior, founding Game Theory, which was widely adopted by economists. In 1951 Princeton mathematician John Forbes Nash Jr. published the article Non-Cooperative Games, becoming the first to define a Nash Equilibrium for non-zero-sum games.

In 1956 American economist Robert Solow (1924–2023) and Australian economist Trevor Swan (1918–1989) proposed the Solow–Swan model, based on productivity, capital accumulation, population growth, and technological progress. In 1956 Swan also proposed the Swan diagram of the internal-external balance. In 1987 Solow was awarded the Nobel Economics Prize.

== Post World War II and globalization (mid to late 20th century) ==
The globalization era began with the end of World War II and the rise of the U.S. as the world's leading economic power, along with the United Nations. To prevent another global depression, the victorious allies countries forgave Germany its war debts and used its surpluses to rebuild Europe and encourage reindustrialization of Germany and Japan. In the 1960s it changed its role to recycling global surpluses.

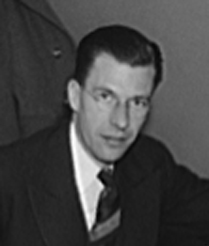
John K. Galbraith (1908–2006) worked under the New Deal administration of Franklin Delano Roosevelt.

After World War II, Canadian-born John Kenneth Galbraith (1908–2006) became one of the standard bearers for pro-active government and liberal-democrat politics. In The Affluent Society (1958), Galbraith argued that voters reaching a certain material wealth begin to vote against the common good. He also argued that the "conventional wisdom" of the conservative consensus was not enough to solve the problems of social inequality. In an age of big business, he argued, it is unrealistic to think of markets of the classical kind. They set prices and use advertising to create artificial demand for their own products, distorting people's real preferences. Consumer preferences actually come to reflect those of corporations – a "dependence effect" – and the economy as a whole is geared to irrational goals. In The New Industrial State Galbraith argued that economic decisions are planned by a private-bureaucracy, a technostructure of experts who manipulate marketing and public relations channels. This hierarchy is self-serving, profits are no longer the prime motivator, and even managers are not in control. Because they are the new planners, corporations detest risk, require steady economic and stable markets. They recruit governments to serve their interests with fiscal and monetary policy, for instance adhering to monetarist policies which enrich money-lenders in the City through increases in interest rates. While the goals of an affluent society and complicit government serve the irrational technostructure, public space is simultaneously impoverished. Galbraith paints the picture of stepping from penthouse villas onto unpaved streets, from landscaped gardens to unkempt public parks. In Economics and the Public Purpose (1973) Galbraith advocates a "new socialism" as the solution, nationalising military production and public services such as health care, introducing disciplined salary and price controls to reduce inequality.

In contrast to Galbraith's linguistic style, the post-war economics profession began to synthesize much of Keynes' work with mathematical representations. Introductory university economics courses began to present economic theory as a unified whole in what is referred to as the neoclassical synthesis. "Positive economics" became the term created to describe certain trends and "laws" of economics that could be objectively observed and described in a value-free way, separate from "normative economic" evaluations and judgments.

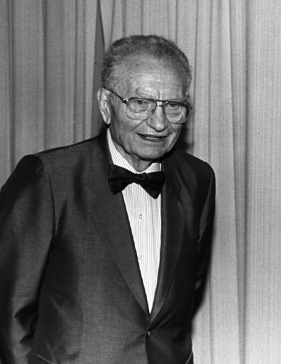
Paul Samuelson (1915–2009) wrote the best selling economics texts.

The Paul Samuelson's (1915–2009) Foundations of Economic Analysis published in 1947 was an attempt to show that mathematical methods could represent a core of testable economic theory. Samuelson started with two assumptions. First, people and firms will act to maximize their self-interested goals. Second, markets tend towards an equilibrium of prices, where demand matches supply. He extended the mathematics to describe equilibrating behavior of economic systems, including that of the then new macroeconomic theory of John Maynard Keynes. Whilst Richard Cantillon had imitated Isaac Newton's mechanical physics of inertia and gravity in competition and the market, the physiocrats had copied the body's blood system into circular flow of income models, William Jevons had found growth cycles to match the periodicity of sunspots, Samuelson adapted thermodynamics formulae to economic theory. Reasserting economics as a hard science was being done in the United Kingdom also, and one celebrated "discovery", of A. W. Phillips, was of a correlative relationship between inflation and unemployment. The workable policy conclusion was that securing full employment could be traded-off against higher inflation. Samuelson incorporated the idea of the Phillips curve into his work. His introductory textbook Economics was influential and widely adopted. It became the most successful economics text ever. Paul Samuelson was awarded the new Nobel Prize in Economics in 1970 for his merging of mathematics and political economy.

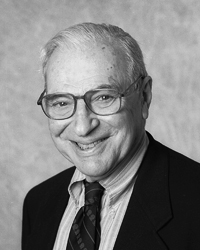
Kenneth Arrow (1921–2017)

American economist Kenneth Arrow's (1921–2017) published Social Choice and Individual Values in 1951. It consider connections between economics and political theory. It gave rise to social choice theory with the introduction of his "Possibility Theorem". This sparked widespread discussion over how to interpret the different conditions of the theorem and what implications it had for democracy and voting. Most controversial of his four (1963) or five (1950/1951) conditions is the independence of irrelevant alternatives.

In the 1950s Kenneth Arrow and Gérard Debreu (1921–2004) developed the Arrow–Debreu model of general equilibria. In 1963 Arrow published a paper which founded Health Economics.

In 1971 Arrow and Frank Hahn published General Competitive Analysis (1971), which reasserted a theory of general equilibrium of prices through the economy. In 1971, US President Richard Nixon's had declared that "We are all Keynesians now", announcing wage and price controls. He lifted this from a comment by Milton Friedman in 1965 which formed a Time.

=== International economics ===
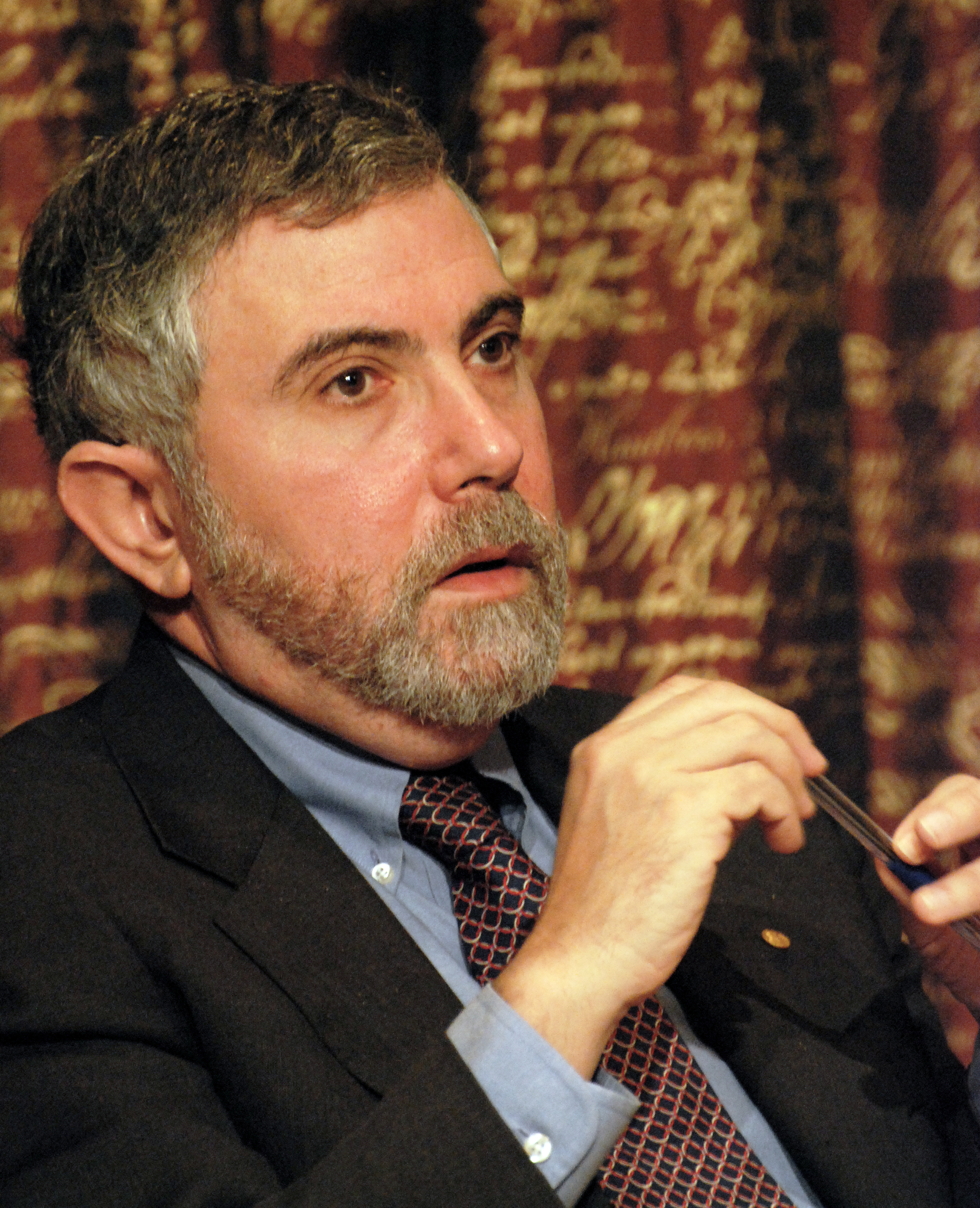
Paul Krugman (1953–)

In 1951 English economist James Meade (1907–1995) published The Balance of Payments, volume 1 of "The Theory of International Economic Policy", which proposed the theory of domestic divergence (internal and external balance), and promoted policy tools for governments. In 1955 he published volume 2 Trade and Welfare, which proposed the theory of the "second-best", and promoted protectionism. He shared the 1977 Nobel Economic Prize with Bertil Ohlin.

In 1979 American economist Paul Krugman (1953–) published a paper founding New trade theory, which attempts to explain the role of increasing returns to scale and network effects in international trade. In 1991 he published a paper founding New economic geography. His textbook International Economics (2007) appears on many undergraduate reading lists. He was awarded the Nobel Prize in Economics in 2008.

=== Development economics ===
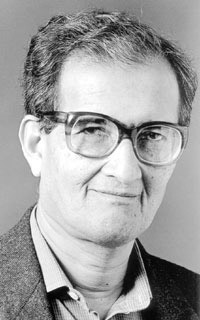
Amartya Sen (1933–)

In 1954 Saint Lucian economist Sir Arthur Lewis (1915–1991) proposed the Dual Sector Model of Development Economics, which claims that capitalism expands by making use of an unlimited supply of labor from the backward non-capitalist "subsistence sector" until it reaches the Lewisian breaking point where wages begin to rise, receiving the 1979 Nobel Economics Prize.

In 1955 Russian-born American economist Simon Kuznets (1901–1985), who introduced the concept of Gross domestic product (GDP) in 1934 published an article revealing an inverted U-shaped relation between income inequality and economic growth, meaning that economic growth increases income disparity between rich and poor in poor countries, but decreases it in wealthy countries. In 1971 he received the Nobel Economics Prize.

Indian economist Amartya Sen (1933–) expressed considerable skepticism about the validity of neoclassical assumptions, and was highly critical of rational expectations theory, devoting his work to Development Economics and human rights.

In 1981, Sen published Poverty and Famines: An Essay on Entitlement and Deprivation (1981), a book in which he argued that famine occurs not only from a lack of food, but from inequalities built into mechanisms for distributing food. Sen also argued that the Bengal famine was caused by an urban economic boom that raised food prices, thereby causing millions of rural workers to starve to death when their wages did not keep up.

In addition to his important work on the causes of famines, Sen's work in the field of development economics has had considerable influence in the formulation of the "Human Development Report", published by the United Nations Development Programme. This annual publication that ranks countries on a variety of economic and social indicators owes much to the contributions by Sen among other social choice theorists in the area of economic measurement of poverty and inequality. Sen was awarded the Nobel Prize in Economics in 1998.

=== New Economic History (Cliometrics) ===
In 1958 American economists Alfred H. Conrad (1924–1970) and John R. Meyer (1927–2009) founded New Economic History, which in 1960 was called Cliometrics by American economist Stanley Reiter (1925–2014) after Clio, the muse of history. It uses neoclassical economic theory to reinterpret historical data, spreading throughout academia, causing economic historians untrained in economics to disappear from history departments. American cliometric economists Douglass Cecil North (1920–2015) and Robert William Fogel (1926–2013) were awarded the 1993 Nobel Economics Prize.

=== Public choice theory and constitutional economics ===
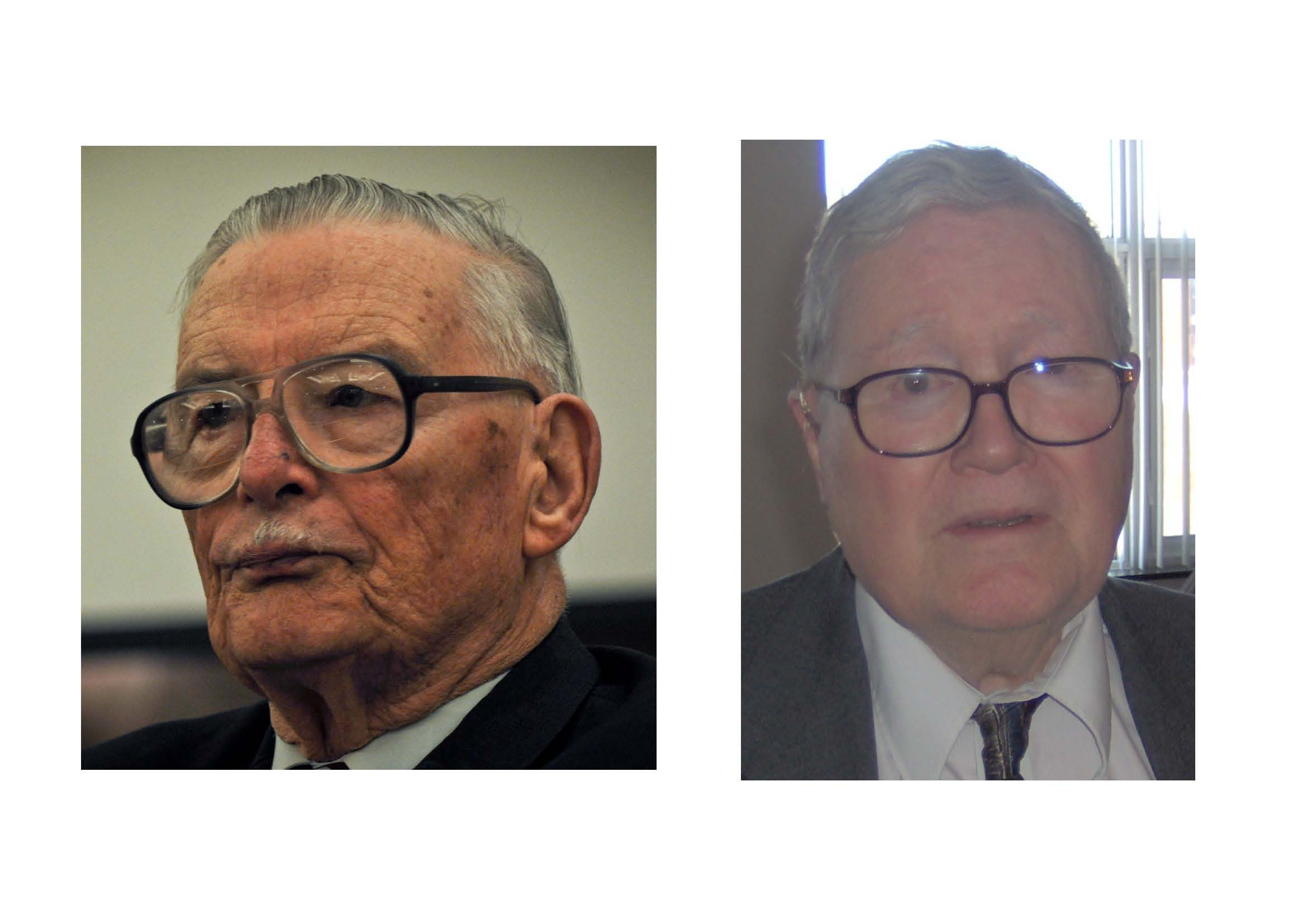
James Buchanan (1919–2013), Gordon Tullock (1922–2014)

In 1962 American economists James M. Buchanan (1919–2013) and Gordon Tullock (1922–2014) published The Calculus of Consent, which revived Public Choice Theory by differentiating politics (the rules of the game) from public policy (the strategies to adopt within the rules), founding Constitutional Economics, the economic analysis of constitutional law. Buchanan was awarded the 1986 Nobel Economics Prize.

=== Impossible trinity ===
In 1962–1963 Scottish economist Marcus Fleming (1911–1976) and Canadian economist Robert Mundell (1932–) published the Mundell–Fleming Model of the Economy, an extension of the IS–LM Model to an open economy, proposing the Impossible Trinity of fixed exchange rate, free capital movement, and an independent monetary policy, only two of which can be maintained simultaneously. Mundell received the 1999 Nobel Economics Prize.

=== Market for corporate control ===
In 1965 American economist Henry G. Manne (1928–2015) published Mergers and the Market for Corporate Control in Journal of Political Economy, which claims that changes in the price of a share of stock in the stock market will occur more rapidly when insider trading is prohibited than when it is permitted, founding the theory of market for corporate control.

=== Information economics ===
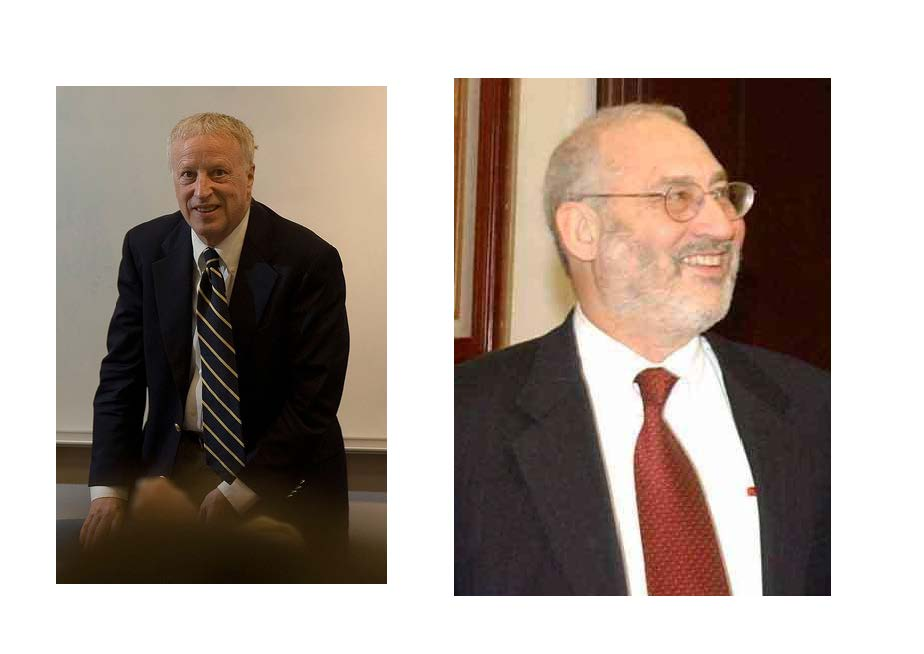
George Akerlof (1940–), Joseph Stiglitz (1943–)

In 1970 George Akerlof (1940–) published the paper The Market for Lemons, founding the theory of Information Economics, receiving the 2001 Nobel Economics Prize.

Joseph E. Stiglitz (1943–) also received the Nobel Economics Prize in 2001 for his work in Information Economics. He has served as chairman of President Clinton's Council of Economic Advisers, and as chief economist for the World Bank. Stiglitz has taught at many universities, including Columbia, Stanford, Oxford, Manchester, Yale, and MIT. In recent years he has become an outspoken critic of global economic institutions. In Making Globalization Work (2007) he offers an account of his perspectives on issues of international economics:

"The fundamental problem with the neoclassical model and the corresponding model under market socialism is that they fail to take into account a variety of problems that arise from the absence of perfect information and the costs of acquiring information, as well as the absence or imperfections in certain key risk and capital markets. The absence or imperfection can, in turn, to a large extent be explained by problems of information."

Stiglitz talks about his book Making Globalization Work here.

=== Market design theory ===
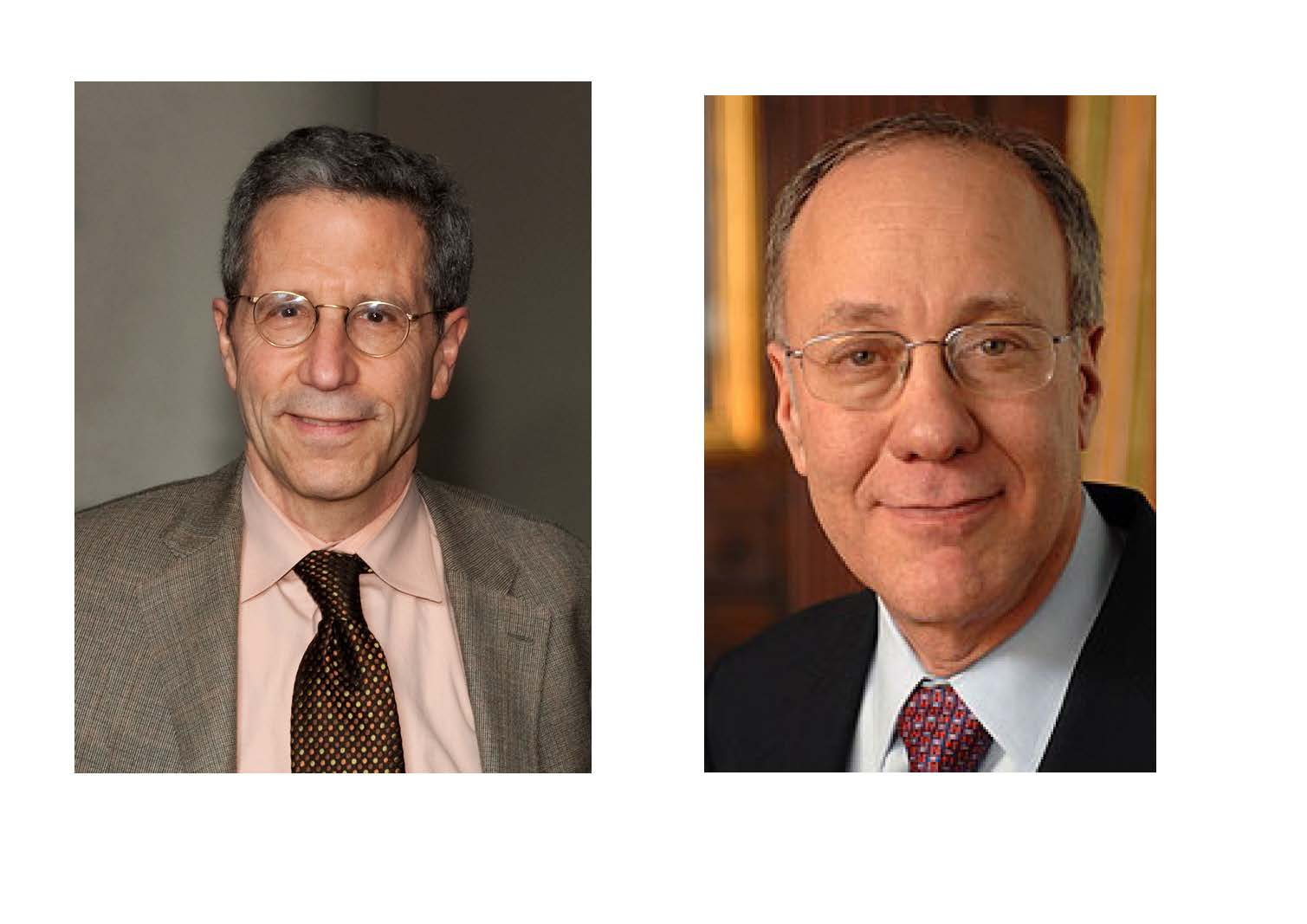
Eric Maskin (1950–), Roger Myerson (1951–)

In 1973 Russian-American mathematician-economist Leonid Hurwicz (1917–2008) founded Market (Mechanism) Design Theory, a.k.a. Reverse Game Theory, which allows people to distinguish situations in which markets work well from those in which they do not, aiding the identification of efficient trading mechanisms, regulation schemes, and voting procedures; he developed the theory with Eric Maskin (1950–) and Roger Myerson (1951–), sharing the 2007 Nobel Economics Prize with them.

=== The Laffer curve and Reaganomics ===
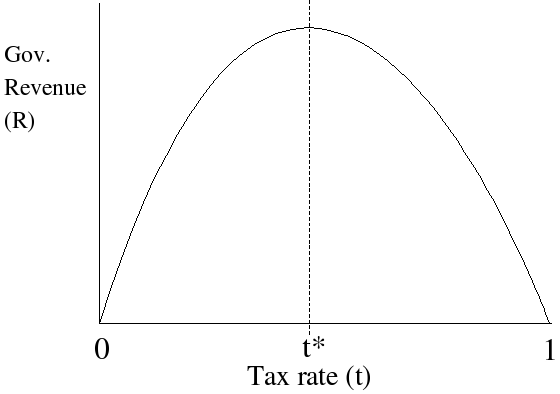
The Laffer Curve posits that, beyond a certain tax rate, government revenue reduces due to ostensible capital flight, reduced incentive to work and innovate, etc.

In 1974 American economist Arthur Laffer formulated the Laffer curve, which postulates that no tax revenue will be raised at the extreme tax rates of 0% and 100%, and that there must be at least one rate where tax revenue would be a non-zero maximum.

This concept was adopted by U.S. President Ronald Reagan in the early 1980s, becoming the cornerstone of Reaganomics, which was co-founded by American economist Paul Craig Roberts.

=== Market regulation ===
In 1986, French economist Jean Tirole (1953–) published "Dynamic Models of Oligopoly", followed by "The Theory of Industrial Organization" (1988), launching his quest to understand market power and regulation, resulting in the 2014 Nobel Economics Prize.

=== Evolution of modern economic thought in China ===
After World War II, China’s economic thought underwent a major transition from a planned economy to a market economy. During the period of the planned economy from the 1950s to the 1970s, a small number of Chinese economists had already begun to reflect on the shortcomings of a purely planned system.

Gu Zhun (1915–1974) was the most representative pioneer among them. In 1957, while working at the Institute of Economics of the Chinese Academy of Sciences, he published the article “A Preliminary Discussion on Commodity Production and the Law of Value under the Socialist System,” in which he argued for the first time that the socialist economy should not abolish the market system but rather utilize market mechanisms to improve efficiency. He advocated using market prices to regulate the allocation of resources and leveraging market competition to enhance efficiency. This view clashed sharply with the prevailing ideology at the time, and as a result, Gu Zhun was labeled a “rightist” in 1957 and subjected to public criticism and re-education through labor. Throughout the nearly 20 years of adversity that followed, he never ceased to reflect on economic system reform. In 1971, in his diary kept during his time at the “May 7th Cadre School,” he directly criticized the Soviet planned economy as a “clumsy, wasteful, and stifling system”; he argued that China must introduce a market information mechanism based on price signals. Scholars such as Wu Jinglian later referred to Gu Zhun as “the first person in China to propose a market economy”.

Following the launch of reform and opening-up in 1978, Chinese economic thought entered a historic transition from a planned to a market-oriented system. In the early stages of this transition, a gradual “dual-track system” strategy was adopted: on the one hand, temporary protections and subsidies were maintained for existing capital-intensive state-owned enterprises to preserve social stability; on the other hand, market access was relaxed and promoted for emerging labor-intensive industries that aligned with China’s comparative advantages. Unlike many transition economies (such as Russia and Eastern European countries) that followed the Washington Consensus and implemented “shock therapy,” China avoided economic collapse and prolonged stagnation, achieving sustained high-speed growth. In summarizing China’s experience, Justin Yifu Lin proposed the New Structural Economics, arguing that developing countries should adopt gradual and pragmatic transition strategies based on their own evolving comparative advantages. However, the transition process also came at a cost, including corruption, widening income disparities, and environmental degradation; these issues became key focal points for subsequent reforms (such as the decision on comprehensively deepening reforms adopted at the Third Plenary Session of the 18th Central Committee in 2013).

== 21st century ==
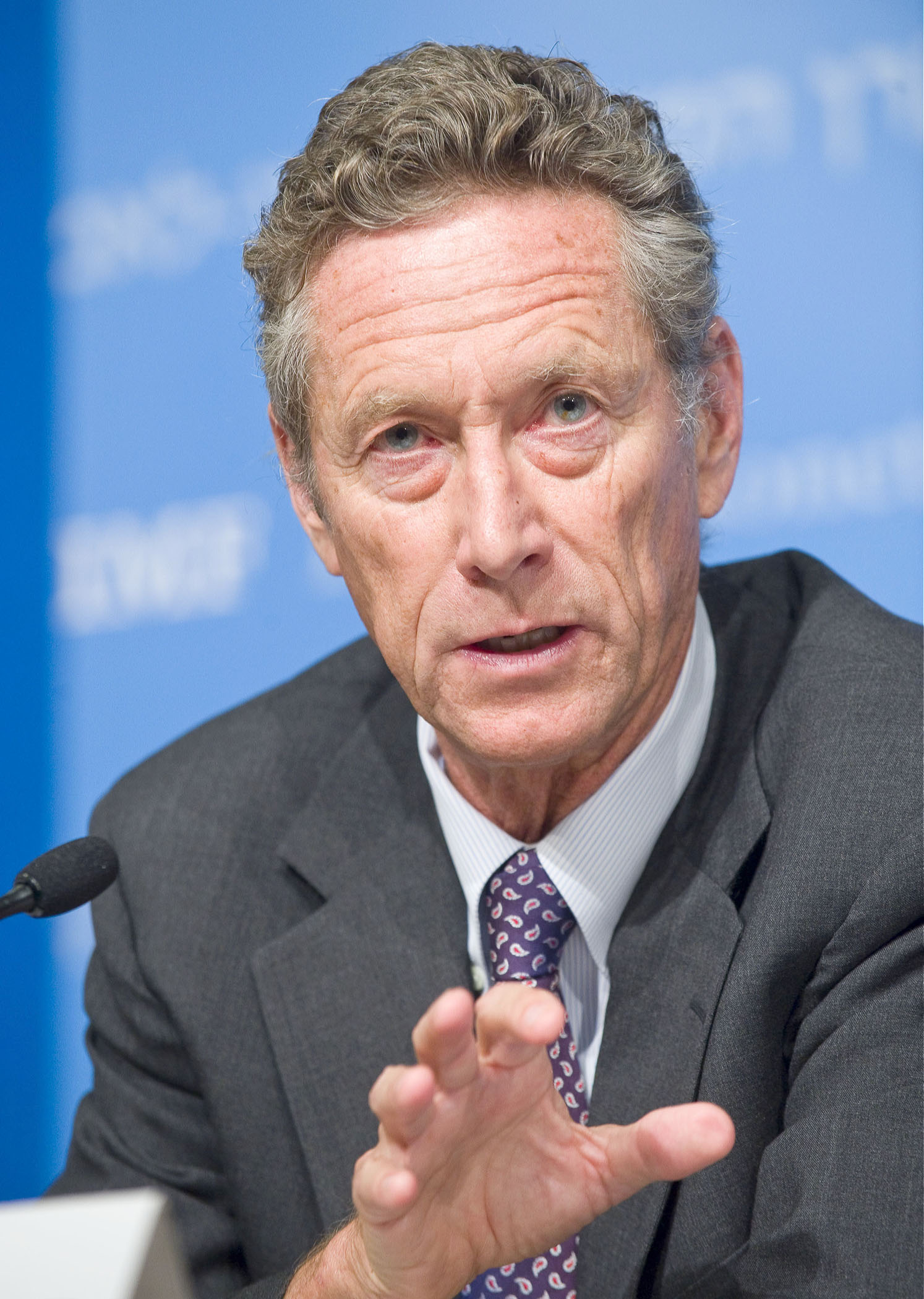
Olivier Blanchard (1948–)

The 2008 financial crisis led to the Great Recession. This prompted some macroeconomists and Financial Economists to question the current orthodoxy.

One response was the Keynesian resurgence. This emerged as a consensus among some policy makers and economists for Keynesian solutions. Figures in this school included Dominique Strauss-Kahn, Olivier Blanchard, Gordon Brown, Paul Krugman, and Martin Wolf. Austerity was another response, the policy of reducing government budget deficits. Austerity policies may include spending cuts, tax increases, or a mixture of both. Two influential academic papers support this position. The first was Large Changes in Fiscal Policy: Taxes Versus Spending, published in October 2009 by Alberto Alesina and Silvia Ardagna. It asserted that fiscal austerity measures did not hurt economies, and actually helped their recovery. The second Growth in a Time of Debt, published in 2010 by Carmen Reinhart and Kenneth Rogoff. It analyzed public debt and GDP growth among 20 advanced economies and claimed that high debt countries grew at −0.1% since WWII. In April 2013 the IMF and the Roosevelt Institute exposed basic calculation flaws in the Reinhart-Rogoff paper, claiming that when the flaws were corrected, the growth of the "high debt" countries was +2.2%, much higher than the original paper predicted. Following this, on 6 June 2013, Paul Krugman published How the Case for Austerity Has Crumbled in The New York Review of Books, arguing that the case for austerity was fundamentally flawed, and calling for an end to austerity measures.

== See also ==
- Corporate law
- Economic history
- Energy economics
- Index of international trade topics
- Labour law
- List of economics journals
- List of economists
- List of important publications in economics
- Outline of economics
- Perspectives on capitalism
- Timeline of international trade
