= Criticism of socialism =

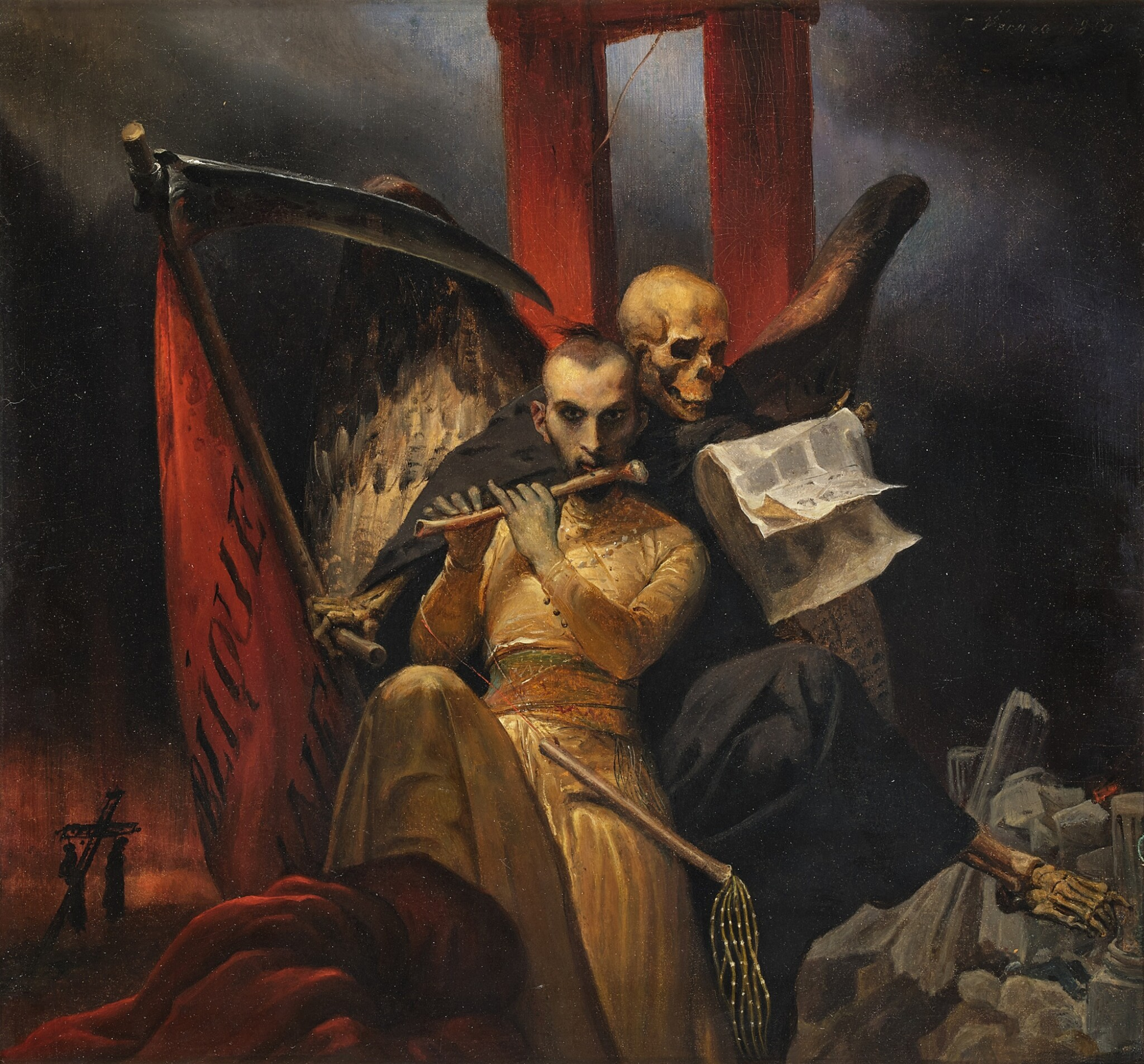
An 1850 painting by Horace Vernet titled Socialism and Cholera, depicting what Vernet thought were two ills that were plaguing France during the mid-19th century

Criticism of socialism is any critique of socialist economics and socialist models of organization and their feasibility, as well as the political and social implications of adopting such a system. Some critiques are not necessarily directed toward socialism as a system but rather toward the socialist movement, parties, or existing states. Some critics consider socialism to be a purely theoretical concept that should be criticized on theoretical grounds, such as in the economic calculation problem and the socialist calculation debate, while others hold that certain historical examples exist and that they can be criticized on practical grounds. Because there are many types of socialism, most critiques are focused on a specific type of socialism, that of the command economy and the experience of Soviet-type economies that may not apply to all forms of socialism. Different models of socialism conflict with each other over questions of property ownership, economic coordination and how socialism is to be achieved. Critics of specific models of socialism might be advocates of a different type of socialism.

According to the Austrian School economist Ludwig von Mises, an economic system (specifically centralized economic planning) that does not use money, financial calculation, and market pricing would be unable to effectively value capital goods and coordinate production, and therefore in his view socialism is impossible because it lacks the necessary information to perform economic calculation in the first place. Another central argument leveled against socialist systems based on economic planning is based on the use of dispersed knowledge. Socialism is unfeasible in this view because information cannot be aggregated by a central body and effectively used to formulate a plan for an entire economy, because doing so would result in distorted or absent price signals; this is known as the economic calculation problem. Other economists criticize models of socialism based on neoclassical economics for their reliance on the faulty and unrealistic assumptions of economic equilibrium and Pareto efficiency.

Critics of socialism have argued that socialist experiments have reduced economic growth and generated chronic shortages of goods and services due to lack of price mechanisms, soft budget constraints and widespread corruption among bureaucrats

Some philosophers have criticized the aims of socialism, arguing that equality erodes away at individual diversities and that the establishment of an equal society would have to entail strong coercion. Many critics point to the mass killings under communist regimes as an indictment of socialism; some socialists respond that they were aberrations, point to mass deaths they argued were caused by capitalism and imperialism, and some say that they are not the socialist model they support. Economic liberals and right-libertarians view private ownership of the means of production and the market exchange as natural entities or moral rights which are central to their conceptions of freedom and liberty and view the economic dynamics of capitalism as immutable and absolute. As a result, they perceive public ownership of the means of production and economic planning as infringements upon liberty.

== Critique of centralized planning ==
=== Distorted or absent price signals ===
Supply and demand chart: political intervention in the creation of prices on a free market through supply and demand leads to a deviation from the equilibrium price, according to socialism's critics, causing a multitude of undesirable side effects.

The economic calculation problem is a criticism of central economic planning which exists in some forms of socialism. It was first proposed in 1854 by the Prussian economist Hermann Heinrich Gossen. It was subsequently expounded in 1902 by the Dutch economist Nicolaas Pierson, in 1920 by Ludwig von Mises and later by Friedrich Hayek. The problem referred to is that of how to distribute resources rationally in an economy. The free market relies on the price mechanism, wherein people individually have the ability to decide how resources should be distributed based on their willingness to give money for specific goods or services. The price conveys embedded information about the abundance of resources as well as their desirability (supply and demand) which in turn allows—on the basis of individual consensual decisions—corrections that prevent shortages and surpluses. Mises and Hayek argued that this is the only possible solution and without the information provided by market prices socialism lacks a method to rationally allocate resources. Those who agree with this criticism argue it is a refutation of socialism and that it shows that a socialist planned economy could never work. The debate raged in the 1920s and 1930s and that specific period of the debate has come to be known by economic historians as "the Socialist Calculation Debate".

Mises argued in a famous 1920 article "Economic Calculation in the Socialist Commonwealth" that the pricing systems in socialist economies were necessarily deficient because if government owned the means of production, then no prices could be obtained for capital goods as they were merely internal transfers of goods in a socialist system and not "objects of exchange", unlike final goods, therefore they were unpriced and hence the system would be necessarily inefficient since the central planners would not know how to allocate the available resources efficiently. This led him to declare "that rational economic activity is impossible in a socialist commonwealth". Mises developed his critique of socialism more completely in his 1922 book Socialism, An Economic and Sociological Analysis.

Mises argued that a socialist system based upon a planned economy would not be able to allocate resources effectively due to the lack of price signals. Because the means of production would be controlled by a single entity, approximating prices for capital goods in a planned economy would be impossible. His argument was that socialism must fail economically because of the economic calculation problem—the impossibility of a socialist government being able to make the economic calculations required to organize a complex economy. Mises projected that without a market economy there would be no functional price system which he held essential for achieving rational and efficient allocation of capital goods to their most productive uses. According to Mises, socialism would fail as demand cannot be known without prices. These arguments were elaborated by subsequent Austrian economists such as Hayek and students such as Hans Sennholz. In 1977, Hayek argued that "prices are an instrument of communication and guidance which embody more information than we directly have" and "the whole idea that you can bring about the same order based on the division of labor by simple direction falls to the ground. ... [I]f you need prices, including the prices of labor, to direct people to go where they are needed, you cannot have another distribution except the one from the market principle".

Hungarian economist János Kornai has written that "the attempt to realize market socialism ... produces an incoherent system, in which there are elements that repel each other: the dominance of public ownership and the operation of the market are not compatible".

Proponents of laissez-faire capitalism argue that although private monopolies do not have any actual competition, there are many potential competitors watching them and if they were delivering inadequate service, or charging an excessive amount for a good or service, investors would start a competing enterprise. The anarcho-capitalist economist Hans-Hermann Hoppe argues that in the absence of prices for the means of production, there is no cost-accounting which would direct labor and resources to the most valuable uses. According to Tibor Machan, "[w]ithout a market in which allocations can be made in obedience to the law of supply and demand, it is difficult or impossible to funnel resources with respect to actual human preferences and goals".

According to economist Milton Friedman: "The loss part is just as important as the profit part. What distinguishes the private system from a government socialist system is the loss part. If an entrepreneur's project doesn't work, he closes it down. If it had been a government project, it would have been expanded, because there is not the discipline of the profit and loss element".

Proponents of chaos theory argue that it is impossible to make accurate long-term predictions for highly complex systems such as an economy.

Pierre-Joseph Proudhon raises similar calculational issues in his General Idea of the Revolution in the 19th Century, but he also proposes certain voluntary arrangements which would also require economic calculation. Leon Trotsky, a fierce proponent of decentralized economic planning, argued that centralized economic planning would be "insoluble without the daily experience of millions, without their critical review of their own collective experience, without their expression of their needs and demands and could not be carried out within the confines of the official sanctums" and "[e]ven if the Politburo consisted of seven universal geniuses, of seven Marxes, or seven Lenins, it will still be unable, all on its own, with all its creative imagination, to assert command over the economy of 170 million people". In contrast to the lack of a marketplace, market socialism can be viewed as an alternative to the traditional socialist model. Theoretically, the fundamental difference between a traditional socialist economy and a market socialist economy is the existence of a market for the means of production and capital goods. Socialist market abolitionists reply that while advocates of capitalism and the Austrian School in particular recognize equilibrium prices do not exist, they nonetheless claim that these prices can be used as a rational basis when this is not the case, hence markets are not efficient. According to market abolitionists socialists, decentralized planning allows for a spontaneously self-regulating system of stock control (relying solely on calculation in kind) to come about and that in turn decisively overcomes the objections raised by the economic calculation argument that any large scale economy must necessarily resort to a system of market prices.

=== Suppression of economic democracy and self-management ===
Central planning is also criticized by elements of the radical left. Libertarian socialist economist Robin Hahnel notes that even if central planning overcame its inherent inhibitions of incentives and innovation, it would nevertheless be unable to maximize economic democracy and self-management, which he believes are concepts that are more intellectually coherent, consistent and just than mainstream notions of economic freedom.

As Hahnel explains: "Combined with a more democratic political system, and redone to closer approximate a best-case version, centrally planned economies no doubt would have performed better. But they could never have delivered economic self-management, they would always have been slow to innovate as apathy and frustration took their inevitable toll, and they would always have been susceptible to growing inequities and inefficiencies as the effects of differential economic power grew. Under central planning neither planners, managers, nor workers had incentives to promote the social economic interest. Nor did impending markets for final goods to the planning system enfranchise consumers in meaningful ways. But central planning would have been incompatible with economic democracy even if it had overcome its information and incentive liabilities. And the truth is that it survived as long as it did only because it was propped up by unprecedented totalitarian political power".

== Critique of public enterprise ==
=== Slow or stagnant technological advance ===
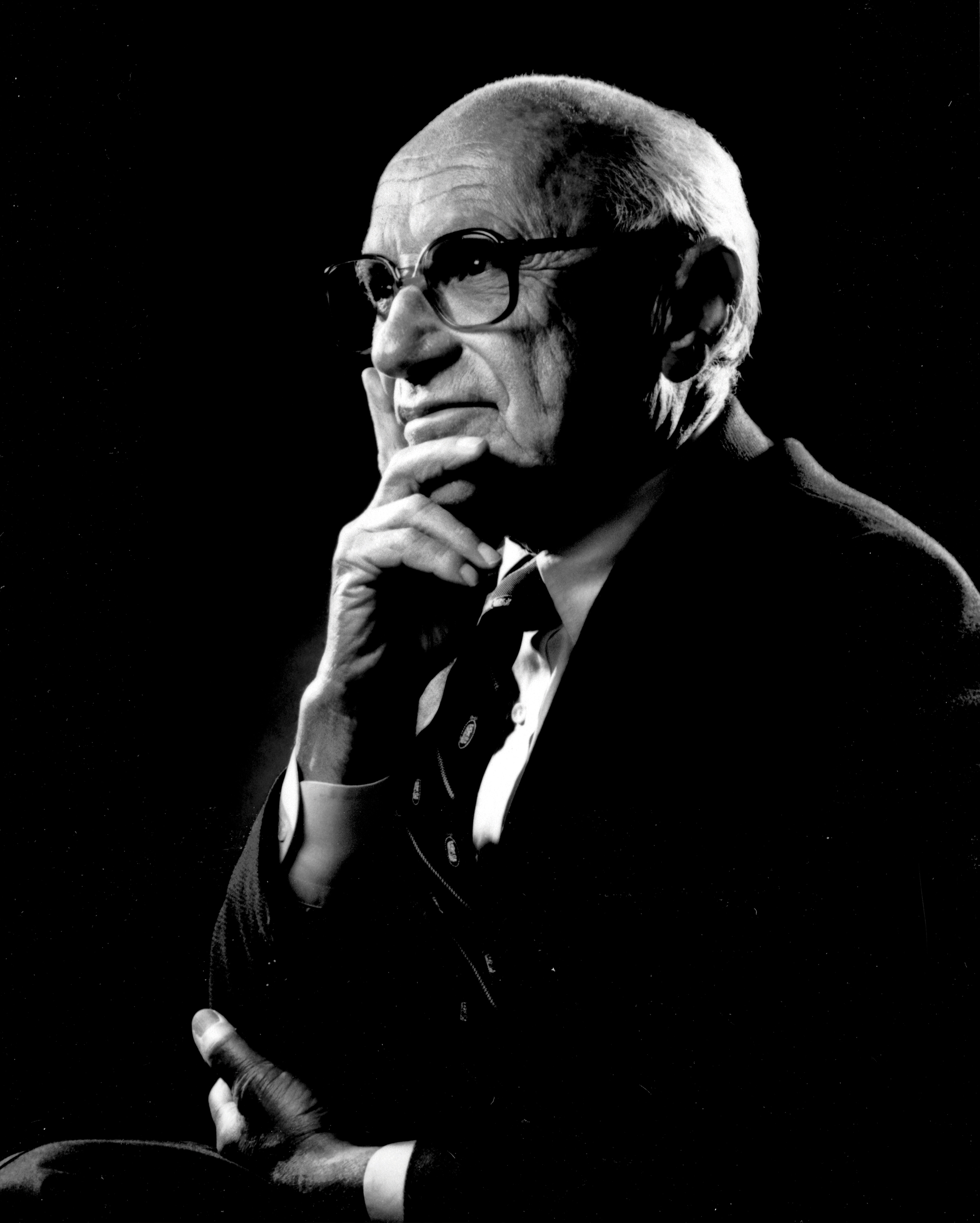
Milton Friedman, winner of the Nobel Memorial Prize in Economic Sciences in 1976, member of the Chicago school of economics and a well-known opponent of socialism

Economist Milton Friedman argued that socialism, by which he meant state ownership over the means of production, impedes technological progress due to competition being stifled. He noted that "we need only look to the United States to see where socialism fails" by observing that the "most technologically backward areas are those where government owns the means of production".

Friedman claimed that socialism advocated the abolition of a free markets and money- and risk-based reward systems, a claim disputed by some socialists. Friedman argues that without such a money- and risk-based reward system, many capitalist inventors, whom Friedman holds would nonetheless exist within socialism, would not risk time or capital for research. Friedman believed that this was one of the reasons for the United States patent system and copyright law, arguing:

Socialism has proved no more efficient at home than abroad. What are our most technologically backward areas? The delivery of first class mail, the schools, the judiciary, the legislative system—all mired in outdated technology. No doubt we need socialism for the judicial and legislative systems. We do not for mail or schools, as has been shown by Federal Express and others, and by the ability of many private schools to provide superior education to underprivileged youngsters at half the cost of government schooling. ...

We all justly complain about the waste, fraud and inefficiency of the military. Why? Because it is a socialist activity—one that there seems no feasible way to privatize. But why should we be any better at running socialist enterprises than the Russians or Chinese?

By extending socialism far beyond the area where it is unavoidable, we have ended up performing essential government functions far less well than is not only possible but than was attained earlier. In a poorer and less socialist era, we produced a nationwide network of roads and bridges and subway systems that were the envy of the world. Today we are unable even to maintain them.

=== Reduced incentives ===
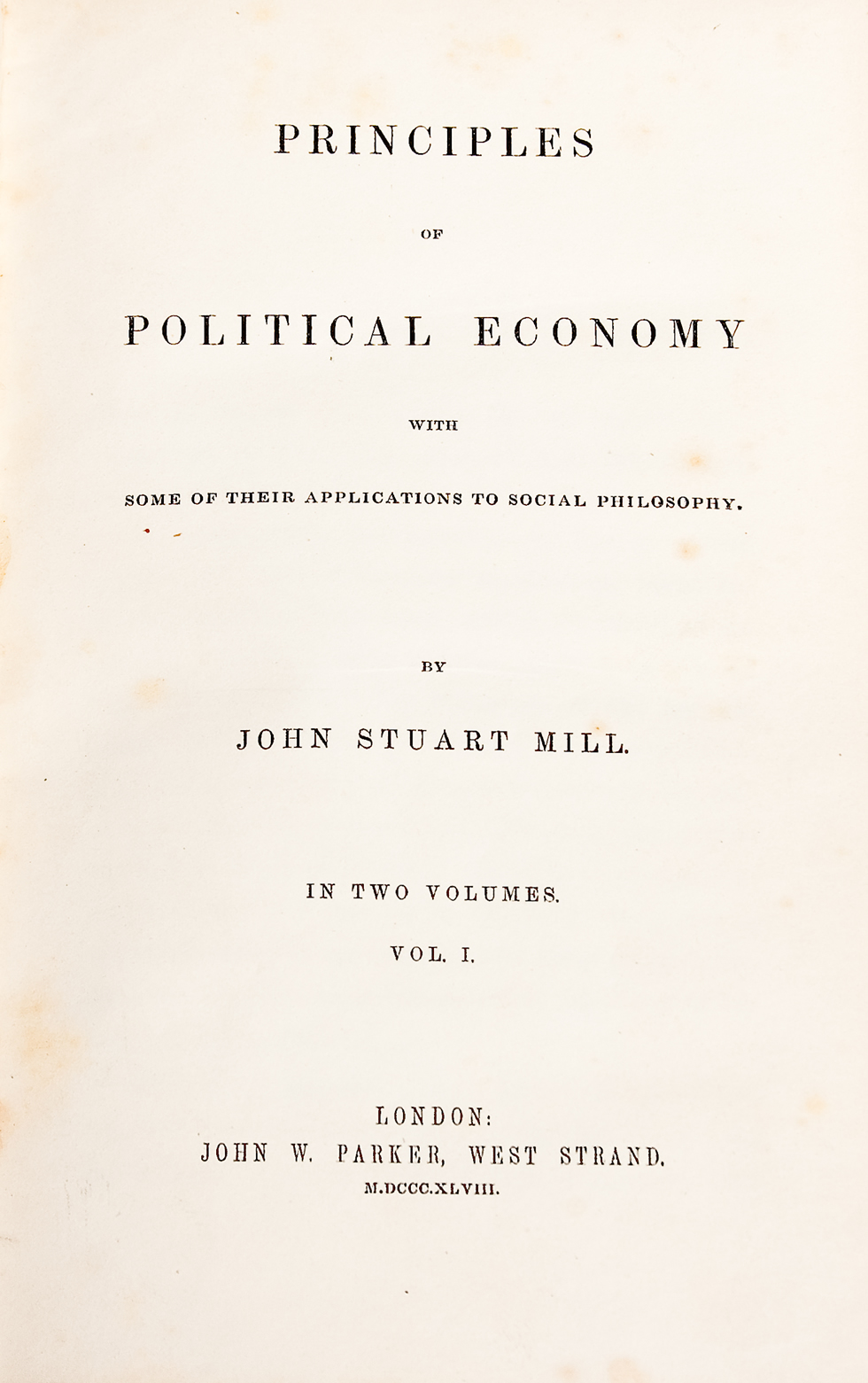
First edition cover to The Principles of Political Economy by John Stuart Mill

One criticism of socialism is that, in any society where everyone holds equal wealth, there can be no material incentive to work because one does not receive rewards for a work well done. They further argue that incentives increase productivity for all people and that the loss of those effects would lead to stagnation. Some critics of socialism argue that income sharing reduces individual incentives to work and therefore incomes should be individualized as much as possible.

In The Principles of Political Economy (1848), John Stuart Mill wrote:

It is the common error of Socialists to overlook the natural indolence of mankind; their tendency to be passive, to be the slaves of habit, to persist indefinitely in a course once chosen. Let them once attain any state of existence which they consider tolerable, and the danger to be apprehended is that they will thenceforth stagnate; will not exert themselves to improve, and by letting their faculties rust, will lose even the energy required to preserve them from deterioration. Competition may not be the best conceivable stimulus, but it is at present a necessary one, and no one can foresee the time when it will not be indispensable to progress.

Mill later altered his views and adopted a socialist perspective, adding chapters to his Principles of Political Economy in defense of a socialist outlook and defending some socialist causes. Within this revised work, he also made the radical proposal that the whole wage system be abolished in favour of a co-operative wage system. Nonetheless, some of his views on the idea of flat taxation remained, albeit in a slightly toned-down form.

He did support some of the socialist principles such as the ones that promoted greater equality and would improve conditions for workers like cooperative ownership and profit-sharing agreements. He believed that worker cooperatives could coordinate incentives more fairly through "partnership... in one of two forms: in some cases, association of the labourers with the capitalist, in others, and perhaps finally in all, association of labourers among themselves" (Mill, Principles). However, he was still skeptical of the centralized socialist systems that condensed power in the state. He warned in On Liberty that "the worth of a State, in the long run, is the worth of the individuals composing it" (Mill, 1859), being scared of if the state took over everything, the individual initiative would die. He was also worried that if competition were to be eliminated entirely it could reduce efficiency and innovation, which for economic progress, are very important. Mill's position can be seen as a middle ground, incorporating the beneficial aspects of socialism while avoiding the potential cons.

== Reduced prosperity ==
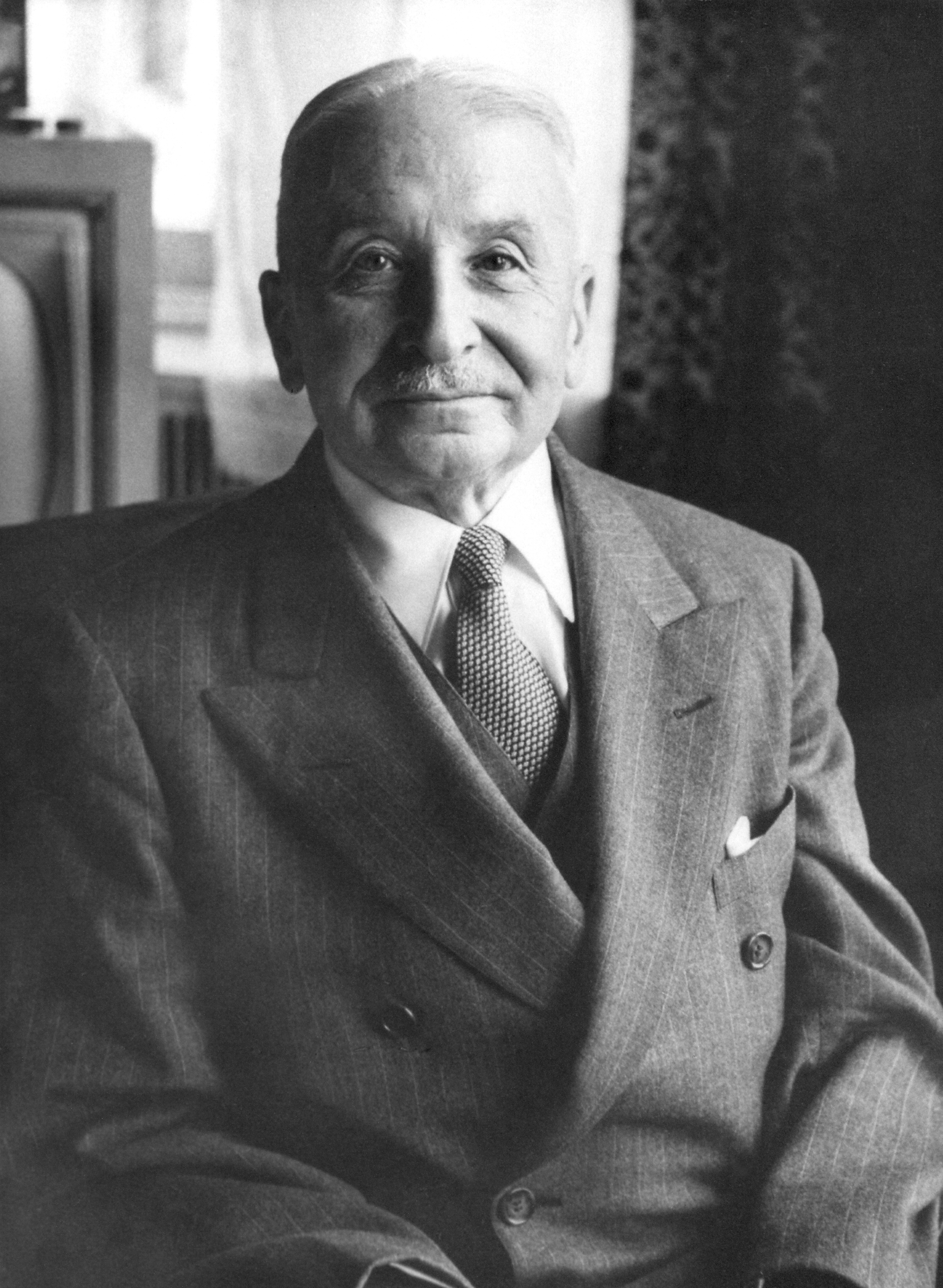
Ludwig von Mises is best known for his work on praxeology studies comparing communism and capitalism.

Austrian school economist Hans-Hermann Hoppe argued that countries where the means of production are nationalized are not as prosperous as those where the means of production are under private control ("prosperous" is defined in terms of GDP). However, not all socialists subscribe to the idea of nationalization, some preferring other forms of socialisation instead.

Another Austrian school economist, Ludwig von Mises, argued that aiming for more equal incomes through state intervention necessarily leads to a reduction in national income and therefore average income. Consequently, he says that the socialist chooses the objective of a more equal distribution of income on the assumption that the marginal utility of income to a poor person is greater than that to a rich person. According to Mises, this mandates a preference for a lower average income over inequality of income at a higher average income. He sees no rational justification for this preference, and he also states that there is little evidence that the objective of greater income equality is achieved.

Mises also says: "The only certain fact about Russian affairs under the Soviet regime with regard to which all people agree is: that the standard of living of the Russian masses is much lower than that of the masses in the country which is universally considered as the paragon of capitalism, the United States of America. If we were to regard the Soviet regime as an experiment, we would have to say that the experiment has clearly demonstrated the superiority of capitalism and the inferiority of socialism".

A 2025 study estimated that socialist experiments across the world reduced annual GDP growth by two percent points due to the lack of informative price mechanisms, dispersed knowledge, property rights and soft budget constraints.

== Social and political effects ==
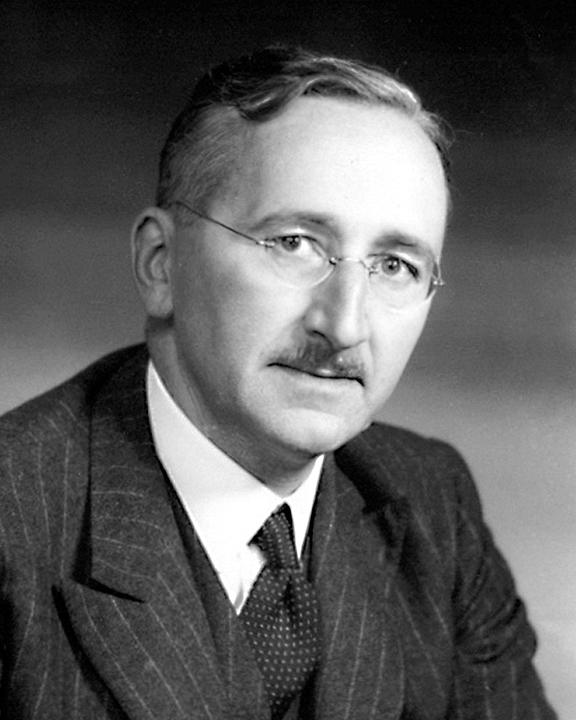
Friedrich Hayek, author of The Road to Serfdom

In The Road to Serfdom, Friedrich Hayek argued that the more even distribution of wealth through the nationalization of the means of production cannot be achieved without a loss of political, economic, and human rights. He argued that to achieve control over means of production and distribution of wealth it is necessary for such socialists to acquire significant powers of coercion. Hayek argued that the road to socialism leads society to totalitarianism and argued that fascism and Nazism were the inevitable outcome of socialist trends in Italy and Germany during the preceding period. Thus, held Hayek, moving leftward from capitalism to socialism is actually moving rightward, from capitalism to fascism. These ideas are encapsulated in the "horseshoe theory". A similar argument has been made by critics such as Dinesh D'Souza, who hold that because the full German name of the German Nazi Party was Nationalsozialistische Deutsche Arbeiterpartei, and because "Nationalsozialistische" translates to "National Socialism," fascism is actually a type of socialism, and so many socialists are Nazis.

Peter Self criticizes the traditional socialist planned economy and argues against pursuing "extreme equality" because he believes it requires "strong coercion" and does not allow for "reasonable recognition [for] different individual needs, tastes (for work or leisure) and talents". Self holds that while a socialist planned economy provides substantially greater freedom than is present in capitalism—under which the vast majority of people are coerced by the threat of starvation to work for the profit of a small capitalist class—adding markets to socialism improves freedom and efficiency. Accordingly, Self recommends market socialism instead of either capitalism or non-market socialism. Philosopher David Schweickart has described similar views.

Mark J. Perry of the conservative American Enterprise Institute (AEI) argued that socialism means giving up freedom for more security. Perry also argued that "Socialism is the Big Lie of the twentieth century. While it promised prosperity, equality, and security, it delivered poverty, misery, and tyranny. Equality was achieved only in the sense that everyone was equal in his or her misery."

Critics of socialism cite the Soviet Union and Venezuela as examples of countries where socialism has failed.

== Leadership corruption ==
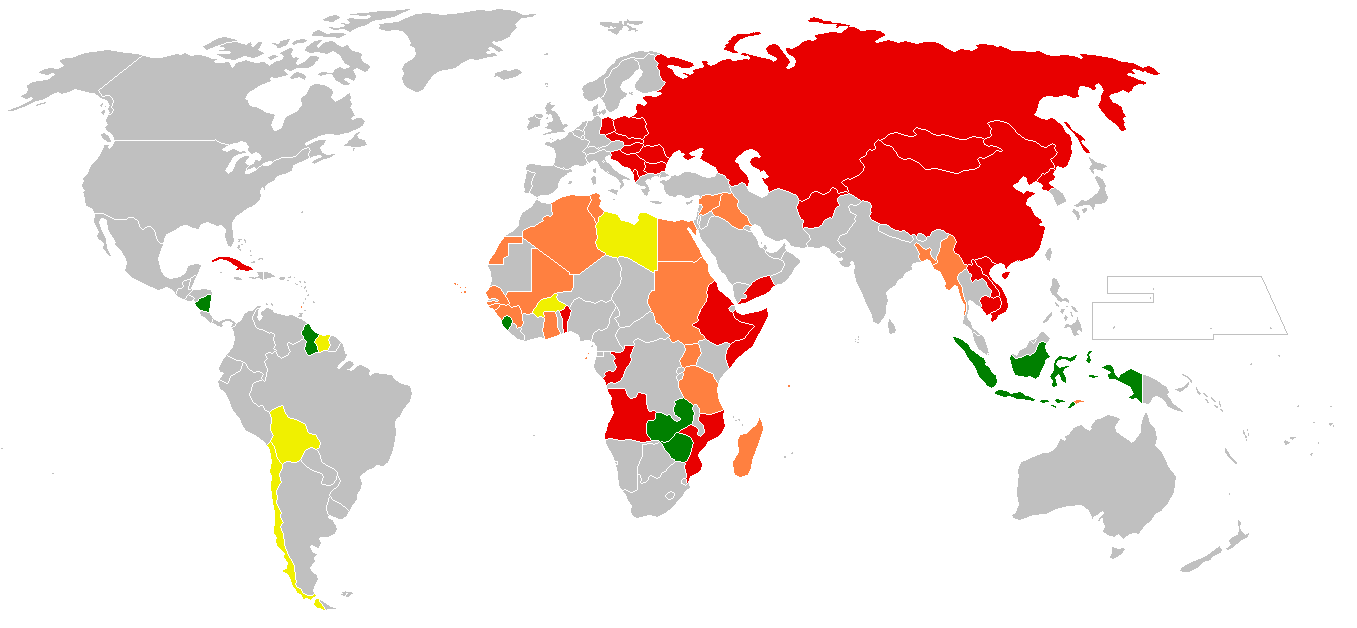
World Map of countries that were at some point ruled by socialist governments

Some critics of socialism see socialism as a type of political state organization instead of as a type of socioeconomic structure (as is traditional). These thinkers generally criticize what they term "socialist states" rather than "socialism."

Milton Friedman argued that the absence of private economic activity would enable political leaders to grant themselves coercive powers, powers that, under a capitalist system, would instead be granted by a capitalist class, which Friedman found preferable. In his campaign against Labour candidate Clement Attlee in the 1945 general election, Winston Churchill claimed that socialism requires totalitarian methods, including a political police, to achieve its goals.

János Kornai demonstrated that the socialist economic system cannot function without single-party rule, as centralized economic direction demands the suppression of alternative centers of power and the political allocation of resources.

== Mass killings ==
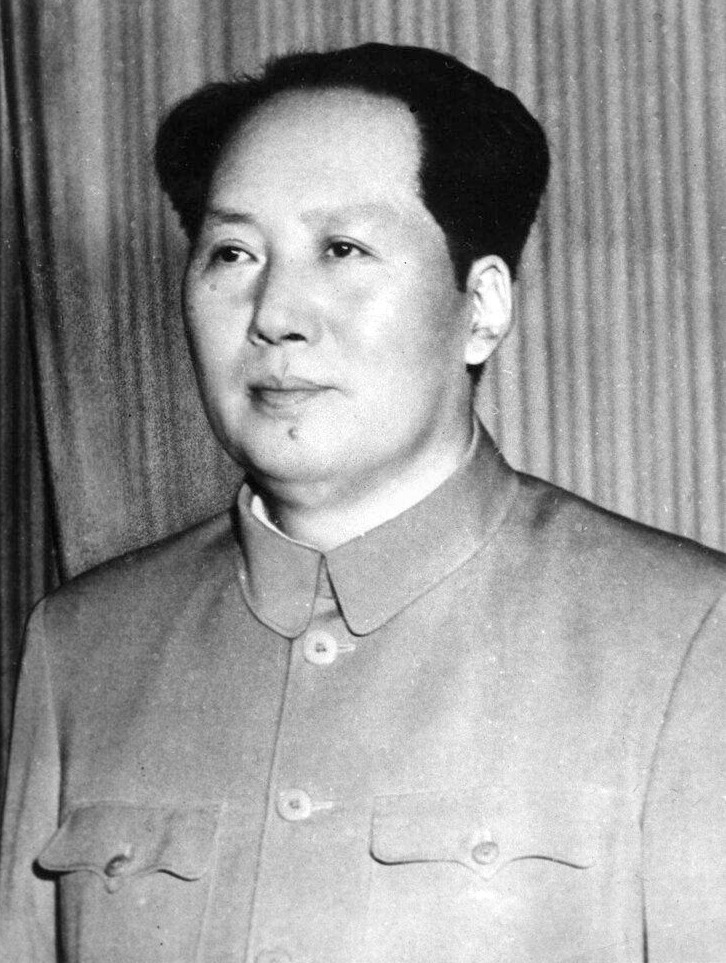
Mao Zedong, Joseph Stalin, and Kim Il Sung were nominal socialist leaders who committed mass killings during the 20th century.

Many commentators on the political right point to the mass killings under communist regimes, claiming them as an indictment of socialism. The Black Book of Communism has been one of the most elaborate and popular works to make this point.

Defenders of socialism state that the mass killings under communist regimes were aberrations caused by specific authoritarian regimes and not caused by socialism itself.

== See also ==
- Anti-capitalism
- Anti-communism
- Anti-Stalinist left
- Criticism of capitalism
- Criticism of communist states
- Criticism of Marxism
- Criticism of social democracy
- Criticism of welfare
- Economic calculation problem
- Economic efficiency
- Economic equilibrium
- Economic liberalization
- The Fatal Conceit
- McCarthyism
- Mixed economy
- Socialist calculation debate
- Soviet-type economic planning
- The Stalinist Legacy
- Tragedy of the commons
