= Perspectives on capitalism by school of thought =

Throughout modern history a variety of perspectives on capitalism have evolved based on different schools of thought.

== Overview ==
Adam Smith was one of the first influential writers on the topic with his book The Wealth of Nations, which is generally considered to be the start of classical economics which emerged in the 18th century. Karl Marx took a different approach, seeing capitalism as a historically specific mode of production and as a phase of economic development that would pass and be replaced by communism. In conjunction with his criticism of capitalism, Marx believed that exploited labor would be the driving force behind a social revolution to a socialist-style economy. For Marx, the cycle of the extraction of the surplus value by the owners of capital or the bourgeoisie becomes the basis of class struggle.

This argument is intertwined with Marx's version of the labor theory of value, asserting that labor is the source of all value and thus of profit. Max Weber considered market exchange rather than production as the defining feature of capitalism. In contrast to their counterparts in prior modes of economic activity, capitalist enterprises feature rationalization of production, directed toward maximizing efficiency and productivity; a tendency leading to a sociological process of enveloping rationalization. According to Weber, workers in pre-capitalist economic institutions understood work in terms of a personal relationship between master and journeyman in a guild, or between lord and peasant in a manor.

Institutional economics, once the main school of economic thought in the 20th-century United States, holds that capitalism cannot be separated from the political and social system within which it is embedded. In the late-19th century, the German Historical School of economics diverged from the emerging Austrian School of economics (which originated in 1871), led at the time by Carl Menger (1840-1921). Later generations of followers of the Austrian School continued to be influential in Western economic thought through much of the 20th century. The Austrian economist Joseph Schumpeter (1883-1950), a forerunner of the Austrian School, emphasized the creative destruction of capitalism — the fact that market economies undergo constant change.

The Austrian economists Ludwig von Mises and Friedrich Hayek were among the leading defenders of market economy against 20th-century proponents of socialist planned economies. Among Mises's arguments were the economic calculation problem, which was first proposed by Mises in 1920 and later expounded by Hayek. The problem referred to is that of how to distribute resources rationally in an economy. The free market solution is the price mechanism, wherein people individually have the ability to decide how a good or service should be distributed based on their willingness to give money for it. Mises and Hayek argued that only market capitalism could manage a complex, modern economy.

Partially opposed to that view, the British economist John Maynard Keynes argued in his 1937 The General Theory of Employment, Interest, and Money that capitalism suffered a basic problem in its ability to recover from periods of slowdowns in investment. Keynes argued that a capitalist economy could remain in an indefinite equilibrium despite high unemployment. Keynes tried to provide solutions to many of Marx’s problems without completely abandoning the classical understanding of capitalism. His work attempted to show that regulation can be effective and that economic stabilizers can rein in the aggressive expansions and recessions that Marx disliked.

These changes sought to create more stability in the business cycle and reduce the abuses of laborers. Keynesian economists argue that Keynesian policies were one of the primary reasons capitalism was able to recover following the Great Depression.

Supply-side economics developed during the 1970s in response to Keynesian economic policy and in particular the failure of demand management to stabilize Western economies during the stagflation of the 1970s in the wake of the oil crisis in 1973. It drew on a range of non-Keynesian economic thought, particularly Austrian School thinking on entrepreneurship and new classical macroeconomics. The intellectual roots of supply-side economics have also been traced back to various early economic thinkers such as Ibn Khaldun, Jonathan Swift, David Hume, Adam Smith and Alexander Hamilton. Typical policy recommendations of supply-side economics are lower marginal tax rates and less regulation. Maximum benefits from taxation policy are achieved by optimizing the marginal tax rates to spur growth, although it is a common misunderstanding that supply side economics is concerned only with taxation policy when it is about removing barriers to production more generally.

As of 2026, the majority academic research on capitalism in the English-speaking world draws on neoclassical economic thought. It favors extensive market coordination and relatively neutral patterns of governmental market regulation aimed at maintaining property rights; deregulated labor markets; corporate governance dominated by financial owners of firms; and financial systems depending chiefly on capital market-based financing rather than state financing.

Milton Friedman took many of the basic principles set forth by Adam Smith and the classical economists and gave them a new twist. One example of this is his article in the September 1970 issue of The New York Times, where he claims that the social responsibility of business is "to use its resources and engage in activities designed to increase its profits…(through) open and free competition without deception or fraud". This is similar to Smith’s argument that self-interest in turn benefits the whole of society.

Work like this helped lay the foundations for the coming marketization (or privatization) of state enterprises and the supply-side economics of Ronald Reagan and Margaret Thatcher. The Chicago School of economics is best known for its free market advocacy and monetarist ideas. According to Friedman and other monetarists, market economies are inherently stable if left to themselves and depressions result only from government intervention.

== Classical political economy ==
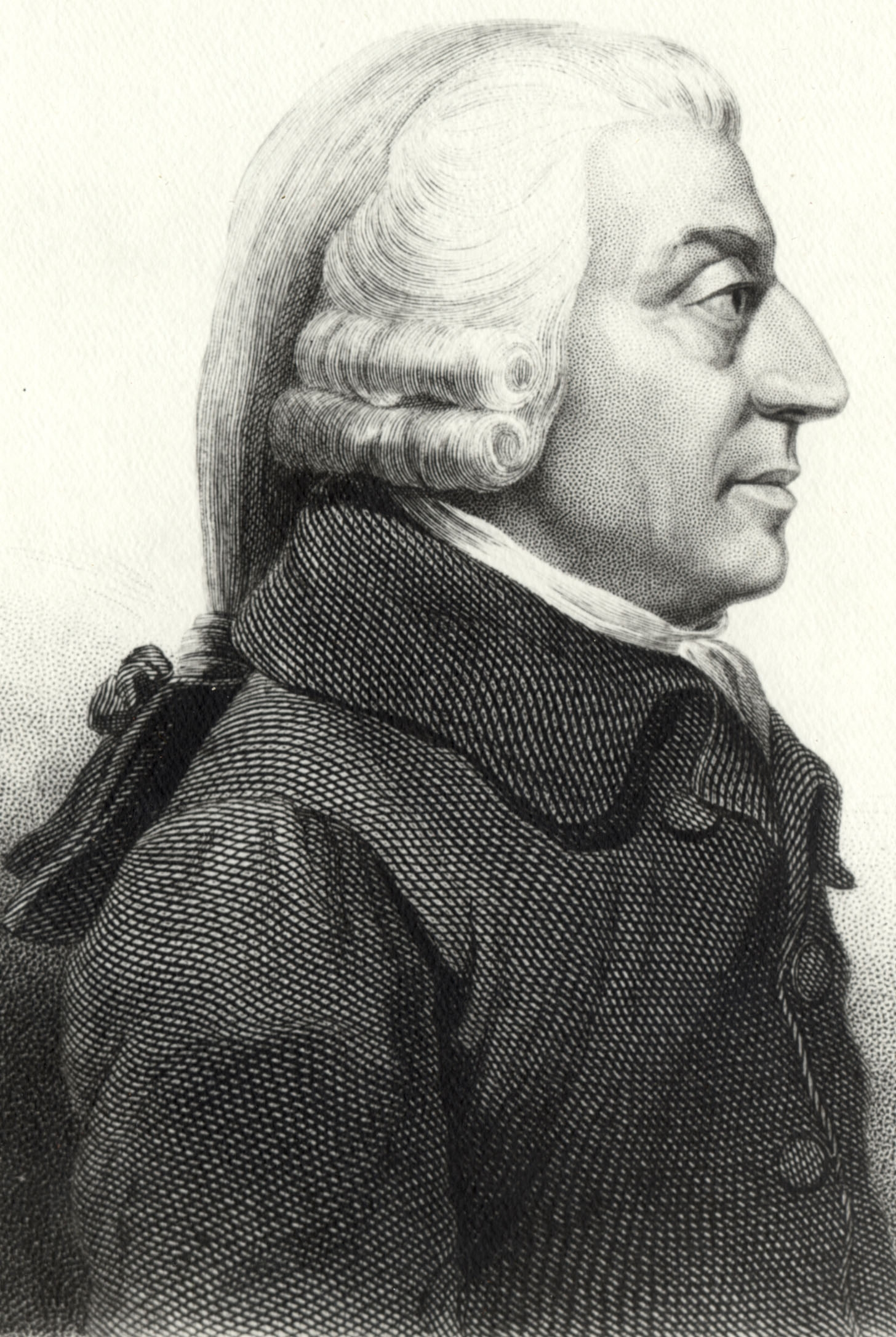
Adam Smith

The classical school of economic thought emerged in Britain in the late 18th century. The classical political economists Adam Smith, David Ricardo, Jean-Baptiste Say and John Stuart Mill published analyses of the production, distribution and exchange of goods in a market that have since formed the basis of study for most contemporary economists.

In France, Physiocrats like François Quesnay promoted free trade based on a conception that wealth originated from land. Quesnay's Tableau Économique (1759) described the economy analytically and laid the foundation of the Physiocrats' economic theory, followed by Anne Robert Jacques Turgot who opposed tariffs and customs duties and advocated free trade. Richard Cantillon defined long-run equilibrium as the balance of flows of income and argued that the supply and demand mechanism around land influenced short-term prices.

Smith's attack on mercantilism and his reasoning for "the system of natural liberty" in The Wealth of Nations (1776) are usually taken as the beginning of classical political economy. Smith devised a set of concepts that remain strongly associated with capitalism today, particularly his theory of the "invisible hand" of the market, through which the pursuit of individual self-interest unintentionally produces a collective good for society. It was necessary for Smith to be so forceful in his argument in favor of free markets because he had to overcome the popular mercantilist sentiment of the time period.

Among civilized and thriving nations, on the contrary, though a great number of people do no labor at all, many of whom consume the produce of ten times, frequently of a hundred times more labour than the greater part of those who work; yet the produce of the whole labour of the society is so great, that all are often abundantly supplied, and a workman, even of the lowest and poorest order, if he is frugal and industrious, may enjoy a greater share of the necessaries and conveniencies of life than it is possible for any savage to acquire. — Adam Smith, The Wealth of Nations

He criticized monopolies, tariffs, duties and other state enforced restrictions of his time and believed that the market is the most fair and efficient arbitrator of resources. This view was shared by David Ricardo, second most important of the classical political economists and one of the most influential economists of modern times.

In The Principles of Political Economy and Taxation (1817), Ricardo developed the law of comparative advantage, which explains why it is profitable for two parties to trade, even if one of the trading partners is more efficient in every type of economic production. This principle supports the economic case for free trade. Ricardo was a supporter of Say's law and held the view that full employment is the normal equilibrium for a competitive economy. He also argued that inflation is closely related to changes in quantity of money and credit and was a proponent of the law of diminishing returns, which states that each additional unit of input yields less and less additional output.

The values of classical political economy are strongly associated with the classical liberal doctrine of minimal government intervention in the economy, though it does not necessarily oppose the state's provision of a few basic public goods. Classical liberal thought has generally assumed a clear division between the economy and other realms of social activity, such as the state.

== Marx and critique of political economy ==
Karl Marx considered capitalism to be a historically specific mode of production. Marx's critique of political economy encompasses the study and exposition of the mode of production and ideology of bourgeois society, that is, the fundamental "economic" and social categories present within what for Marx is the capitalist mode of production. In contrast to the classics of political economy, Marx was concerned with lifting the "ideological veil" of surface phenomena and exposing the norms, axioms, social practices, institutions and so on, that reproduced the social phenomenon of capital. The central works in Marx's critique of political economy are Grundrisse, A Contribution to the Critique of Political Economy and Das Kapital. Marx's companion Friedrich Engels also critiqued the economy in his Outlines of a Critique of Political Economy (1844), which helped lay down some foundation for what Marx was to take further, and Engels just like Marx also compared economists with theologians, e.g by referring to Adam Smith as the economic Luther.

Some foundational concepts in Marx critique of political economy are the following:

- Labour and capital are historically specific forms of social relations, and labour isn't the source of all wealth.
- Labour is the other side of the same coin as capital, labour presupposes capital, and capital presupposes labour.
- Money is not in any way something trans-historical or "natural" (which goes for the other categories of the economy as well), and gains its value due to social relations rather than any inherent quality.
- The individual doesn't exist in some form of vacuum but is rather enmeshed in social relations.

For Marx, the capitalist stage of development or "bourgeois society" represented the most advanced form of social organization to date, but he also thought that the working classes would come to power in a worldwide socialist or communist transformation of human society as the end of the series of first aristocratic, then capitalist and finally working class rule was reached.

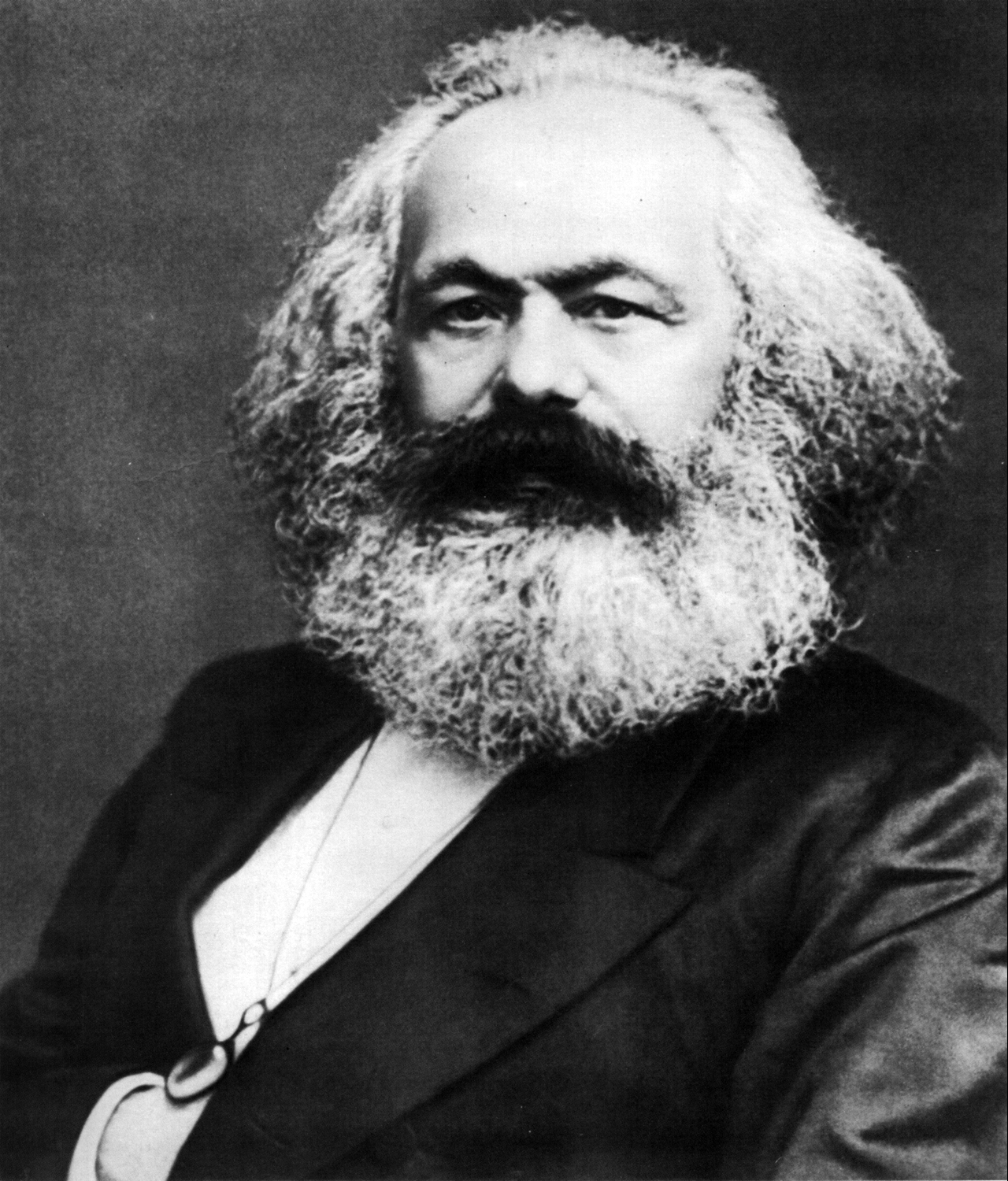
Karl Marx in 1875

Following Adam Smith, Marx distinguished the use value of commodities from their exchange value in the market. According to Marx, capital is created with the purchase of commodities for the purpose of creating new commodities with an exchange value higher than the sum of the original purchases. For Marx, the use of labor power had itself become a commodity under capitalism because the exchange value of labor power—as reflected in the wage—is less than the value it produces for the capitalist.

He argues this difference in values constitutes surplus value, which the capitalists extract and accumulate. In his book Capital, Marx argues that the capitalist mode of production is distinguished by how the owners of capital extract this surplus from workers—all prior class societies had extracted surplus labor, but capitalism was new in doing so via the sale-value of produced commodities. He argues that a core requirement of a capitalist society is that a large portion of the population must not possess sources of self-sustenance that would allow them to be independent and must instead be compelled to survive to sell their labor to manage to survive.

The commodity is first of all, an external object, a thing which through its qualities satisfies human needs of whatever kind. The nature of these needs, whether they arise, for example, from the stomach, or the imagination, makes no difference. Nor does it matter here how the thing satisfies man's need, whether directly as a means of subsistence, i.e. an object of consumption, or indirectly as a means of production. — Karl Marx, Das Kapital

In conjunction with his criticism of capitalism was Marx's belief that exploited labor would be the driving force behind a revolution . For Marx, this cycle of the extraction of the surplus value by the owners of capital or the bourgeoisie becomes the basis of class struggle.

Nature builds no machines, no locomotives, railways, electric telegraphs, self-acting mules etc. These are products of human industry; natural material transformed into organs of the human will over nature, or of human participation in nature. They are organs of the human brain, created by the human hand; the power of knowledge, objectified. The development of fixed capital indicates to what degree general social knowledge has become a direct force of production, and to what degree, hence, the conditions of the process of social life itself have come under the control of the general intellect and been transformed in accordance with it. — Karl Marx, Grundrisse

In Imperialism, the Highest Stage of Capitalism (1916), Vladimir Lenin modified classic Marxist theory and argued that capitalism necessarily induced monopoly capitalism—which he also called "imperialism"—to find new markets and resources, representing the last and highest stage of capitalism.

Some 20th-century Marxian economists consider capitalism to be a social formation where capitalist class processes dominate, but are not exclusive. To these thinkers, capitalist class processes are simply those in which surplus labor takes the form of surplus value, usable as capital while other tendencies for utilization of labor nonetheless exist simultaneously in existing societies where capitalist processes are predominant. However, other late Marxian thinkers argue that a social formation as a whole may be classed as capitalist if capitalism is the mode by which a surplus is extracted even if this surplus is not produced by capitalist activity as when an absolute majority of the population is engaged in non-capitalist economic activity.

David Harvey extends Marxian thinking through which he theorizes the differential production of place, space and political activism under capitalism. He uses Marx’s theory of crisis to aid his argument that capitalism must have its "fixes", but that we cannot predetermine what fixes will be implemented, nor in what form they will be.

This idea of fix is suggestive and could mean fix as in stabilize, heal or solve, or as in a junky needing a fix—the idea of preventing feeling worse in order to feel better. In Limits to Capital (1982), Harvey outlines an overdetermined, spatially restless capitalism coupled with the spatiality of crisis formation and its resolution. Furthermore, his work has been central for understanding the contractions of capital accumulation and international movements of capitalist modes of production and money flows.

In his essay, "Notes towards a theory of uneven geographical development", Harvey examines the causes of the extreme volatility in contemporary political economic fortunes across and between spaces of the world economy. He bases this uneven development on four conditionalities: (1) the material embedding of capital accumulation processes in the web of socio-ecological life; (2) accumulation by dispossession; (3) the law-like character of capital accumulation in space and time; and (4) political, social and "class" struggles at a variety of geographical scales.

== Weberian political sociology ==
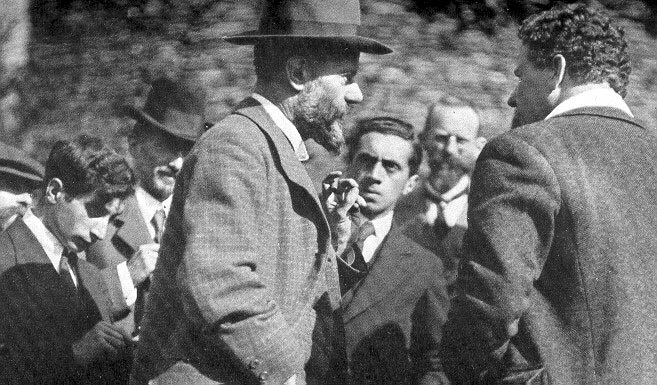
Max Weber in 1917

In some social sciences, the understanding of the defining characteristics of capitalism has been strongly influenced by 19th century German social theorist Max Weber. Weber considered market exchange rather than production as the defining feature of capitalism. In contrast to their counterparts in prior modes of economic activity, capitalist enterprises are characterized by their rationalization of production, directed toward maximizing efficiency and productivity, a tendency leading to a sociological process of enveloping rationalization. According to Weber, workers in pre-capitalist economic institutions understood work in terms of a personal relationship between master and journeyman in a guild, or between lord and peasant in a manor.

In his book The Protestant Ethic and the Spirit of Capitalism (1904–1905), Weber sought to trace how a particular form of religious spirit, infused into traditional modes of economic activity, was a condition of possibility of modern Western capitalism. For Weber, the spirit of capitalism was in general that of ascetic Protestantism—this ideology was able to motivate extreme rationalization of daily life, a propensity to accumulate capital by a religious ethic to advance economically and thus also the propensity to reinvest capital: this was sufficient then to create "self-mediating capital" as conceived by Marx.

This is pictured in Proverbs 22:29 "Seest thou a man diligent in his calling? He shall stand before kings" and in Colossians 3:23 "Whatever you do, do your work heartily, as for the Lord rather than for men". In the Protestant Ethic, Weber further stated that "moneymaking—provided it is done legally—is, within the modern economic order, the result and the expression of diligence in one’s calling" and "If God show you a way in which you may lawfully get more than in another way (without wrong to your soul or to any other), if you refuse this, and choose the less gainful way, you cross one of the ends of your calling, and you refuse to be God's steward, and to accept His gifts and use them for him when He requireth it: you may labour to be rich for God, though not for the flesh and sin" (p. 108).

Most generally for Weber, Western capitalism was the "rational organization of formally free labor". The idea of the "formally free" laborer meant in the double sense of Marx that the laborer was both free to own property and free of the ability to reproduce his labor power, i.e. was the victim of expropriation of his means of production. It is only on these conditions, still abundantly obvious in the modern world of Weber, that Western capitalism is able to exist.

For Weber, modern Western capitalism represented the order "now bound to the technical and economic conditions of machine production which to-day determine the lives of all the individuals who are born into this mechanism, not only those directly concerned with economic acquisition, with irresistible force. Perhaps it will so determine them until the last ton of fossilized coal is burnt" (p. 123). This is further seen in his criticism of "specialists without spirit, hedonists without a heart" that were developing in his opinion with the fading of the original Puritan "spirit" associated with capitalism.

== Institutional economics ==
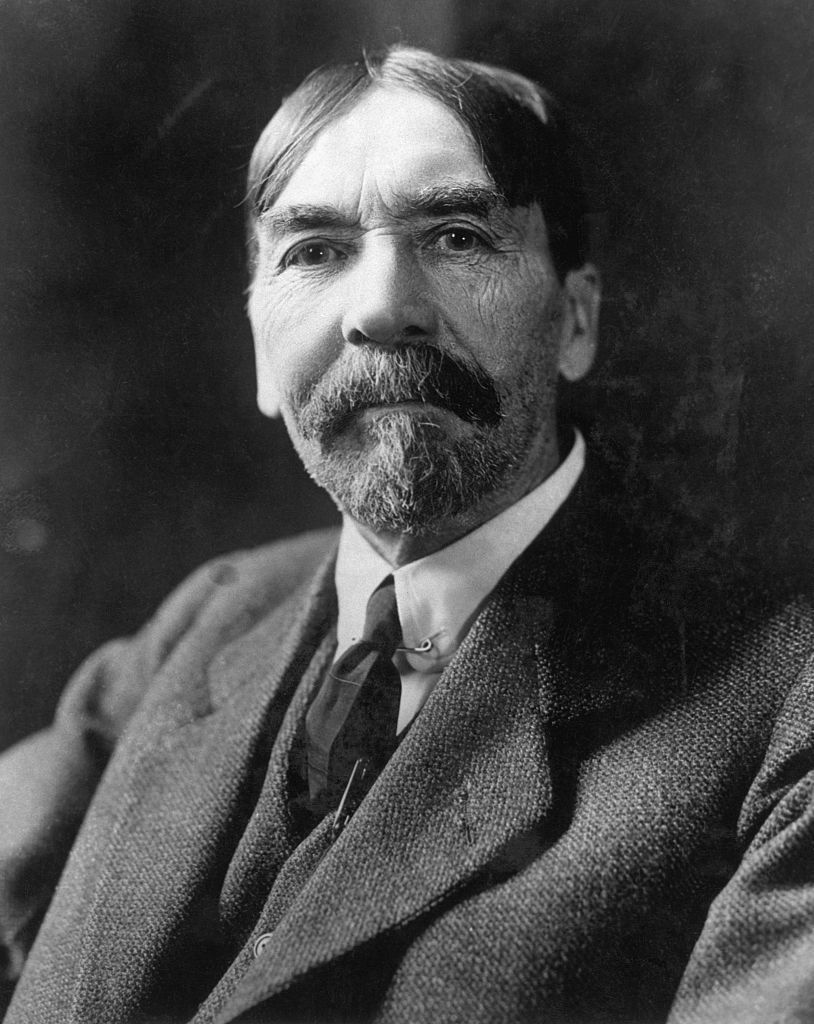
Thorstein Veblen

Once the main school of economic thought in the United States, institutional economics holds that capitalism cannot be separated from the political and social system within which it is embedded. It emphasizes the legal foundations of capitalism (see John R. Commons) and the evolutionary, habituated and volitional processes by which institutions are erected and then changed (see John Dewey, Thorstein Veblen and Daniel Bromley).

One key figure in institutional economics was Thorstein Veblen who in his book The Theory of the Leisure Class (1899) analyzed the motivations of wealthy people in capitalism who conspicuously consumed their riches as a way of demonstrating success. The concept of conspicuous consumption was in direct contradiction to the neoclassical view that capitalism was efficient.

In The Theory of Business Enterprise (1904), Veblen distinguished the motivations of industrial production for people to use things from business motivations that used, or misused, industrial infrastructure for profit, arguing that the former is often hindered because businesses pursue the latter. Output and technological advance are restricted by business practices and the creation of monopolies. Businesses protect their existing capital investments and employ excessive credit, leading to depressions and increasing military expenditure and war through business control of political power.

== German Historical School and Austrian School ==
From the perspective of the German Historical School, capitalism is primarily identified in terms of the organization of production for markets. Although this perspective shares similar theoretical roots with that of Weber, its emphasis on markets and money lends it different focus. For followers of the German Historical School, the key shift from traditional modes of economic activity to capitalism involved the shift from medieval restrictions on credit and money to the modern monetary economy combined with an emphasis on the profit motive.

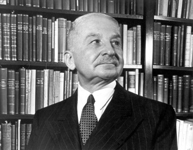
Ludwig von Mises

In the late 19th century, the German Historical School of economics diverged with the emerging Austrian School of economics, led at the time by Carl Menger. Later generations of followers of the Austrian School continued to be influential in Western economic thought through much of the 20th century. The Austrian economist Joseph Schumpeter, a forerunner of the Austrian School of economics, emphasized the "creative destruction" of capitalism—the fact that market economies undergo constant change.

At any moment of time, posits Schumpeter, there are rising industries and declining industries. Schumpeter and many contemporary economists influenced by his work argue that resources should flow from the declining to the expanding industries for an economy to grow, but they recognized that sometimes resources are slow to withdraw from the declining industries because of various forms of institutional resistance to change.

The Austrian economists Ludwig von Mises and Friedrich Hayek were among the leading defenders of market economy against 20th century proponents of socialist planned economies. Mises and Hayek argued that only market capitalism could manage a complex, modern economy.

The effect of the people's agreeing that there must be central planning, without agreeing on the ends, will be rather as if a group of people were to commit themselves to take a journey together without agreeing where they want to go; with the result that they may all have to make a journey which most of them do not want at all. — Friedrich Hayek, The Road to Serfdom

Among their arguments were the economic calculation problem, which was first proposed by Mises in 1920 and later expounded by Hayek. The problem referred to is that of how to distribute resources rationally in an economy. The free market solution is the price mechanism, wherein people individually have the ability to decide how a good or service should be distributed based on their willingness to give money for it. The price conveys embedded information about the abundance of resources as well as their desirability which in turn allows corrections that prevent shortages and surpluses on the basis of individual consensual decisions.

Mises and Hayek argued that this is the only possible solution and without the information provided by market prices socialism lacks a method to rationally allocate resources. Mises argued in a famous 1920 article "Economic Calculation in the Socialist Commonwealth" that the pricing systems in socialist economies were necessarily deficient because if government owned or controlled the means of production, then no rational prices could be obtained for capital goods as they were merely internal transfers of goods in a socialist system and not "objects of exchange", unlike final goods, therefore they were unpriced and hence the system would be necessarily inefficient since the central planners would not know how to allocate the available resources efficiently. This led him to declare "that rational economic activity is impossible in a socialist commonwealth". Mises developed his critique of socialism more completely in his 1922 book Socialism: An Economic and Sociological Analysis.

Since a modern economy produces such a large array of distinct goods and services and consists of such a large array of consumers and enterprises, asserted Mises and Hayek, the information problems facing any other form of economic organization other than market capitalism would exceed its capacity to handle information. Thinkers within supply-side economics built on the work of the Austrian School and particularly emphasize Say's law that "supply creates its own demand". To this school, capitalism is defined by lack of state restraint on the decisions of producers.

Austrian economists claim that Marx failed to make the distinction between capitalism and mercantilism. They argue that Marx conflated the imperialistic, colonialistic, protectionist and interventionist doctrines of mercantilism with capitalism.

Austrian economics has been a major influence on some forms of right-libertarianism in which laissez-faire capitalism is considered to be the ideal economic system. It influenced economists and political philosophers and theorists including Henry Hazlitt, Hans-Hermann Hoppe, Israel Kirzner, Murray Rothbard, Walter Block and Richard M. Ebeling.

== Keynesian economics ==
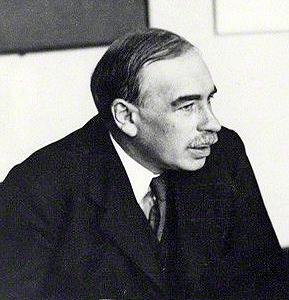
John Maynard Keynes

In his 1937 The General Theory of Employment, Interest, and Money, the British economist John Maynard Keynes argued that capitalism suffered a basic problem in its ability to recover from periods of slowdowns in investment. Keynes argued that a capitalist economy could remain in an indefinite equilibrium despite high unemployment.

Essentially rejecting Say's law, he argued that some people may have a liquidity preference that would see them rather hold money than buy new goods or services, which therefore raised the prospect that the Great Depression would not end without what he termed in the General Theory "a somewhat comprehensive socialization of investment".

Keynesian economics challenged the notion that laissez-faire capitalist economics could operate well on their own without state intervention used to promote aggregate demand, fighting high unemployment and deflation of the sort seen during the 1930s. He and his followers recommended "pump-priming" the economy to avoid recession: cutting taxes, increasing government borrowing and spending during an economic down-turn. This was to be accompanied by trying to control wages nationally partly through the use of inflation to cut real wages and to deter people from holding money.

The right remedy for the trade cycle is not to be found in abolishing booms and thus keeping us permanently in a semi-slump; but in abolishing slumps and thus keeping us permanently in a quasi-boom. — John Maynard Keynes, The General Theory of Employment, Interest and Money

Keynes tried to provide solutions to many of Marx’s problems without completely abandoning the classical understanding of capitalism. His work attempted to show that regulation can be effective and that economic stabilizers can rein in the aggressive expansions and recessions that Marx disliked. These changes sought to create more stability in the business cycle and reduce the abuses of laborers. Keynesian economists argue that Keynesian policies were one of the primary reasons capitalism was able to recover following the Great Depression. However, the premises of Keynes’s work have since been challenged by neoclassical and supply-side economics and the Austrian School.

Another challenge to Keynesian thinking came from his colleague Piero Sraffa and subsequently from the Neo-Ricardian school that followed Sraffa. In Sraffa's highly technical analysis, capitalism is defined by an entire system of social relations among both producers and consumers, but with a primary emphasis on the demands of production. According to Sraffa, the tendency of capital to seek its highest rate of profit causes a dynamic instability in social and economic relations.

== Supply-side economics ==
Supply-side economics is a school of macroeconomic thought that argues that economic growth can be most effectively created by lowering barriers for people to produce (supply) goods and services, such as adjusting income tax and capital gains tax rates and by allowing greater flexibility by reducing regulation. Consumers will then benefit from a greater supply of goods and services at lower prices.

The term "supply-side economics" was thought for some time to have been coined by journalist Jude Wanniski in 1975, but according to Robert D. Atkinson's Supply-Side Follies the term "supply side" ("supply-side fiscalists") was first used in 1976 by Herbert Stein (a former economic adviser to President Nixon) and only later that year was this term repeated by Jude Wanniski. Its use connotes the ideas of economists Robert Mundell and Arthur Laffer. Today, supply-side economics is often conflated with the politically rhetorical term "trickle-down economics", but as Jude Wanniski points out in his book The Way The World Works trickle-down economics is conservative Keynesianism associated with the Republican Party.

What the welfare system and other kinds of governmental programs are doing is paying people to fail. In so far as they fail, they receive the money; in so far as they succeed, even to a moderate extent, the money is taken away. — Thomas Sowell during a discussion in Milton Friedman's "Free to Choose" television series in 1980

Typical policy recommendations of supply-side economics are lower marginal tax rates and less regulation. Maximum benefits from taxation policy are achieved by optimizing the marginal tax rates to spur growth, although it is a common misunderstanding that supply side economics is concerned only with taxation policy when it is about removing barriers to production more generally.

Many early proponents argued that the size of the economic growth would be significant enough that the increased government revenue from a faster-growing economy would be sufficient to compensate completely for the short-term costs of a tax cut and that tax cuts could in fact cause overall revenue to increase.

== Neoclassical economics and the Chicago School ==
Today, the majority academic research on capitalism in the English-speaking world draws on neoclassical economic thought. It favors extensive market coordination and relatively neutral patterns of governmental market regulation aimed at maintaining property rights; deregulated labor markets; corporate governance dominated by financial owners of firms; and financial systems depending chiefly on capital market-based financing rather than state financing.

Milton Friedman took many of the basic principles set forth by Adam Smith and the classical economists and gave them a new twist. One example of this is his article in the September 1970 issue of The New York Times, where he claims that the social responsibility of business is "to use its resources and engage in activities designed to increase its profits…(through) open and free competition without deception or fraud". This is similar to Smith’s argument that self-interest in turn benefits the whole of society. Work like this helped lay the foundations for the coming marketization (or privatization) of state enterprises and the supply-side economics of Ronald Reagan and Margaret Thatcher.

The Chicago School of economics is best known for its free market advocacy and monetarist ideas. According to Friedman and other monetarists, market economies are inherently stable if left to themselves and depressions result only from government intervention.

One of the great mistakes is to judge policies and programs by their intentions rather than their results. — Milton Friedman, interview with Richard Heffner on The Open Mind (7 December 1975)

Friedman argued that the Great Depression was result of a contraction of the money supply controlled by the Federal Reserve and not by the lack of investment as John Maynard Keynes: "There is likely to be a lag between the need for action and government recognition of the need; a further lag between recognition of the need for action and the taking of action; and a still further lag between the action and its effects". Ben Bernanke, former Chairman of the Federal Reserve, is among the economists today generally accepting Friedman's analysis of the causes of the Great Depression.

Neoclassical economists, today the majority of economists, consider value to be subjective, varying from person to person and for the same person at different times and thus reject the labor theory of value. Marginalism is the theory that economic value results from marginal utility and marginal cost (the marginal concepts). These economists see capitalists as earning profits by forgoing current consumption, by taking risks, and by organizing production.

== Mainstream economics ==
Mainstream economics is a loose term used to refer to the non-heterodox economics taught in prominent universities. It is most closely associated with neoclassical economics, or more precisely by the neoclassical synthesis, which combines neoclassical approach to microeconomics with Keynesian approach to macroeconomics.

Mainstream economists are not generally separated into schools, but two major contemporary orthodox economic schools of thought are the "saltwater and freshwater schools". The saltwater schools consist of the universities and other institutions located near the East and West Coast of the United States, such as Berkeley, Harvard, Massachusetts Institute of Technology, University of Pennsylvania, Princeton, Columbia, Duke, Stanford and Yale. Freshwater schools include the University of Chicago, Carnegie Mellon University, the University of Rochester and the University of Minnesota. They were referred to as the "freshwater school" since Pittsburgh, Chicago, Rochester and Minneapolis are located nearer to the Great Lakes.

The Saltwater school is associated with Keynesian ideas of government intervention into the free market while the Freshwater schools are skeptical of the benefits of the government. Mainstream economists do not in general identify themselves as members of a particular school, but they may be associated with approaches within a field such as the rational-expectations approach to macroeconomics.

== See also ==
=== Concepts ===
- Consumption (economics)
- Democracy and economic growth
- Economic liberalism
- Economic sociology
- Financial market
- Free price system
- Gains from trade
- History of capitalism
- History of economic thought
- Industrial Revolution
- Mass production
- Objectivism
- Positive non-interventionism
- Spontaneous order

=== People ===
- Amartya Sen
- Andrew Carnegie
- Ayn Rand
- Eugen von Böhm-Bawerk
- Frank Stilwell
- Frederic Bastiat
- Friedrich Engels
- John D. Rockefeller
- John Locke
- Joseph Stiglitz
- J. P. Morgan
- Karl Marx
- Milton Friedman

=== Works ===
- Capitalism and Freedom
- Capitalism: The Unknown Ideal
- Economics in One Lesson
- Free to Choose
- Grundrisse
- Individualism and Economic Order
- Man, Economy, and State
- The Anti-Capitalistic Mentality
- The Law
