= Economic Calculation in the Socialist Commonwealth =

1920 article by Ludwig Von Mises

Cover of the English 1990 edition of "Economic Calculation in the Socialist Commonwealth"

Economic Calculation in the Socialist Commonwealth is an article by Austrian School economist Ludwig von Mises. Its critique against economic calculation in a centrally planned economy triggered the decades-long economic calculation debate.

The article was first published 1920 in German under the title Die Wirtschaftsrechnung im sozialistischen Gemeinwesen and based on a lecture Mises gave in 1919 as a response to a book by Otto Neurath, arguing for the feasibility of central planning. Two years later, the essay was incorporated into Mises's book Socialism: An Economic and Sociological Analysis.

== Synopsis ==
Mises laid out that economic calculation requires two fundamental things

1. A medium of exchange (i.e money)
2. Markets

According to Mises, although it is possible to perform economic calculation in a proficient manner without these two requirements present, very few circumstances exist. These circumstances include economic calculation within a household.

To him, cost-benefit analysis is not hard to do on a personal scale. It is not hard to pick between a certain amount of wine and a certain amount of oil. However, because marginal utility is not homogeneous and universal, people will have different preferences. For example, a teetotaler may prefer oil to wine, whereas an alcoholic may prefer wine. Thus the central planner or bureaucrat will have trouble distributing resources as prices cannot be set without markets as prices reflect the supply and demand of goods, labour and resources. Buying and selling consumer goods within a socialist state will simply be internal transfers of goods and not "objects of exchange", which sets the price mechanism out of order.

Mises thought that Economic Calculation is only possible (outside of extremely limited circumstances) by information provided by market prices, which reflects the changes of individual subjective values. Bureaucratic, centrally planned methods of resource allocation are inherently irrational and do not allocate resources in the most efficient method, which means that economic calculation in a socialist commonwealth is impossible. Because of the economist's idea that cost-benefit analysis is imperative and crucial, the socialist economy is also impossible.

== Criticisms ==
=== Left-wing criticism ===
Marxist computer programmer Paul Cockshott argues that economic calculation is possible within a socialist state as long as computational devices are used. In Towards a New Socialism's "Information and Economics: A Critique of Hayek" and "Against Mises", he argues that central planning is simplified by the use of computers in calculating the component of price not accounted for by Marxian labor theories of value.

=== Right-wing criticism ===
One of the few "non-Austrian" anarcho-capitalists, Bryan Caplan, argues that Mises is unable to prove why the socialist economy would be "impossible". While agreeing with the concept of a calculation problem he argues that the Austrian School employs it indistinctly. Caplan argues that:

"Ever since Mises, Austrians have overused the economic calculation argument. In the absence of detailed empirical evidence showing that this particular problem is the most important one, it is just another argument out of hundreds on the list of arguments against socialism. How do we know that the problem of work effort, or innovation, or the underground economy, or any number of other problems were not more important than the calculation problem? The collapse of Communism has led Austrians to loudly proclaim that 'Mises was right.' Yes, he was right that socialism was a terrible economic system - and only the collapse of Communism has shown us how bad it really was. However, current events do nothing to show that economic calculation was the insuperable difficulty of socialist economies. There is no natural experiment of a socialist economy that suffered solely from its lack of economic calculation. Thus, economic history as well as pure economic theory fails to establish that the economic calculation problem was a severe challenge for socialism."

== Influence ==
Many consider Economic Calculation in the Socialist Commonwealth to be Mises's most influential work, while others view Human Action: A Treatise on Economics to be more important of a book, as it fills the magnum opus role.

Joseph T Salerno, an American Austrian school economist considers it to be among his best works. He writes:

"The significance of Mises's 1920 article extends far beyond its devastating demonstration of the impossibility of socialist economy and society. It provides the rationale for the price system, purely free markets, the security of private property against all encroachments, and sound money. Its thesis will continue to be relevant as long as economists and policy-makers want to understand why even minor government economic interventions consistently fail to achieve socially beneficial results. "Economic Calculation in the Socialist Commonwealth" surely ranks among the most important economic articles written this century."

== See also ==
- Economic calculation problem
- Socialist calculation debate
- Cost–benefit analysis
- Austrian School
- Ludwig von Mises
- Criticism of Socialism
