= Economic calculation problem =

Critique of planned economies

The economic calculation problem (ECP) is a criticism of using central economic planning (rather than market-based mechanisms) for the allocation of the factors of production. First proposed by Ludwig von Mises (1881–1973) in his 1920 article "Economic Calculation in the Socialist Commonwealth", it was later elaborated by Friedrich Hayek (1899-1992), who reframed the issue as a knowledge problem: the relevant economic information is dispersed, tacit, constantly changing, and thus cannot be centralized.

In his 1920 article, Mises described the nature of the price system under capitalism and described (while criticizing other theories of value) how individual subjective values translate into the objective information necessary for rational allocation of resources in society. He argued that central planning necessarily leads to an irrational and inefficient allocation of resources. In market exchanges, prices reflect the supply and demand of resources, labor and products. In the article, Mises focused his criticism on the deficiencies of the socialisation of capital goods, but he later went on to elaborate on various different forms of socialism in his book Socialism (1922). He briefly mentioned the problem in Part 3 of Human Action: a Treatise on Economics (1949), where he also elaborated on the different types of socialism, namely the "Hindenburg" and "Lenin" models, both of which he viewed as fundamentally flawed despite their ideological differences.

Mises and Hayek argued that economic calculation is only possible using information provided through market prices and that centralist methods of allocation lack methods to rationally allocate resources. Mises's analysis centered on price theory, while Hayek went with a more feathered analysis of information and entrepreneurship. Debate raged in the 1920s and 1930s, and that specific period of the debate has come to be known by economic historians as the socialist calculation debate. Mises' initial criticism provoked multiple reactions and led to the conception of trial-and-error market socialism, most notably the Lange–Lerner theorem.

In his 1920 paper, Mises argued that pricing systems in state-socialist economies were necessarily deficient because if a public entity owned all the means of production, no rational prices could be obtained for capital goods as they were merely internal transfers of goods and not "objects of exchange", unlike final goods. Therefore, they were unpriced and hence the system would be necessarily irrational as the central planners would not know how to allocate the available resources efficiently. He wrote that "rational economic activity is impossible in a socialist commonwealth". Mises developed his critique of socialism more completely in his 1922 book Socialism, arguing that the market price system is an expression of praxeology and cannot be replicated by any form of bureaucracy.

Notable critics both of Mises's original argument and of Hayek's newer proposition include anarcho-capitalist economist Bryan Caplan (born 1971) and Marxist computer-scientist Paul Cockshott (born 1952), as well as other communists.

== Theory ==
=== Subject ===
The economic calculation problem is primarily applied to centrally planned economies. Mises had utilized Economic Calculation in the Socialist Commonwealth to counterargue Otto Neurath's statements concerning central planning's feasibility, invoking "the supreme economic council" and equating socialism to "a society where the means of production are State controlled."

=== Comparing heterogeneous goods ===
Hayek argues that money, as a medium of exchange, enables buyers to compare the costs of goods without having knowledge of their underlying factors; the consumer can simply focus on his personal cost-benefit decision. He asserts that the price system promotes an efficient allocation of resources by agents who may not have explicit knowledge of all of the conditions of production or supply. This is called the signalling function of prices as well as the rationing function which prevents over-use of any resource.

Without the market process to fulfill such comparisons, critics of non-market socialism say that it lacks any way to compare different goods and services and would have to rely on calculation in kind. The resulting decisions, it is claimed, would therefore be made without sufficient knowledge to be considered rational.

=== Entrepreneurship ===
According to Mises, entrepreneurs lack the profit motive to take risks under socialism and so are far less likely to attempt to supply consumer demands. He states that without the price system to match consumer utility to incentives for production, or even indicate those utilities "without providing incentives", state planners are much less likely to invest in new ideas to satisfy consumers' desires. He also concluded that entrepreneurs would also lack the ability to economize within the production process, causing repercussions for consumers.

=== Coherent planning ===
As for socialism, Mises (1944) and Hayek (1937) insisted that bureaucrats in individual ministries could not coordinate their plans without a price system due to the local knowledge problem. Opponents argued that in principle an economy can be seen as a set of equations. Thus, using information about available resources and the preferences of people, it should be possible to calculate an optimal solution for resource allocation. Friedrich von Hayek responded that the system of equations required too much information that would not be easily available, and the ensuing calculations would be too difficult. This is partly because individuals possess useful knowledge but do not realize its importance, may have no incentive to transmit the information, or may have incentive to transmit false information about their preferences. He contended that the only rational solution is to utilize all the dispersed knowledge in the market place through the use of price signals. The early debates were made before the much greater calculating powers of modern computers became available but also before research on chaos theory. In the 1980s, Alexander Nove argued that the calculations would take millions of years even with the best computers. It may be impossible to make long-term predictions for a highly complex system such as an economy.

However, Hayek's argumentation is not only regarding computational complexity for the central planners. He further argues that much of the information individuals have cannot be collected or used by others. First, individuals may have no or little incentive to share their information with central or even local planners. Second, the individual may not be aware that he has valuable information; and when he becomes aware, it is only useful for a limited time, too short for it to be communicated to the central or local planners. Third, the information is useless to other individuals if it is not in a form that allows for meaningful comparisons of value (i.e. money prices as a common basis for comparison). Therefore, Hayek argues, individuals must acquire data through prices in real markets.

=== Financial markets ===
Prices in futures markets play a special role in economic calculation. Futures markets develop prices for commodities in future time periods. It is in futures markets that entrepreneurs sort out plans for production based on their expectations. Futures markets are a link between entrepreneurial investment decisions and household consumer decisions. Since most goods are not explicitly traded in futures markets, substitute markets are needed. The stock market serves as a ‘continuous futures market’ that evaluates entrepreneurial plans for production (Lachmann 1978). Generally speaking, the problem of economic calculation is solved in financial markets as Mises argued:

The problem of economic calculation arises in an economy which is perpetually subject to change [...]. In order to solve such problems it is above all necessary that capital be withdrawn from particular undertakings and applied in other lines of production [...]. [This] is essentially a matter of the capitalists who buy and sell stocks and shares, who make loans and recover them, who speculate in all kinds of commodities.

== Example ==
Mises gave the example of choosing between producing wine or oil within a centrally planned economy, making the following point:

It will be evident, even in the socialist society, that 1,000 hectolitres of wine are better than 800, and it is not difficult to decide whether it desires 1,000 hectolitres of wine rather than 500 of oil. There is no need for any system of calculation to establish this fact: the deciding element is the will of the economic subjects involved. But once this decision has been taken, the real task of rational economic direction only commences, i.e., economically, to place the means at the service of the end. That can only be done with some kind of economic calculation. The human mind cannot orient itself properly among the bewildering mass of intermediate products and potentialities of production without such aid. It would simply stand perplexed before the problems of management and location.

== Implementation of central planning decisions ==
In The Road to Serfdom, Hayek also argues that the central administrative resource allocation, which he says often must take away resources and power from subordinate leaders and groups, necessarily requires and therefore selects ruthless leaders and the continued strong threat of coercion and punishment in order for the plans to be somewhat effectively implemented. This, he concludes, in combination with what he sees as failures of the central planning, slowly leads socialism down the road to an oppressive dictatorship.

Central planning was also criticized by socialist economists such as Janos Kornai and Alexander Nove. Robin Cox has argued that the economic calculation argument can only be successfully rebutted on the assumption that a moneyless socialist economy would be to a large extent spontaneously ordered via a self-regulating system of stock control which would enable decision-makers to allocate production goods on the basis of their relative scarcity using calculation in kind. This was only feasible in an economy where most decisions were decentralised.

== Limitations and criticism ==
=== Efficiency of markets ===
Some academics and economists argue that the claim a free market is an efficient, or even the most efficient, method of resource allocation is incorrect. Alexander Nove argued that Mises "tends to spoil his case by the implicit assumption that capitalism and optimum resource allocation go together" in Mises' "Economic Calculation in the Socialist Commonwealth". Joan Robinson argued that many prices in modern capitalism are effectively "administered prices" created by "quasi monopolies", thus challenging the connection between capital markets and rational resource allocation.

Socialist market abolitionists argue that whilst advocates of capitalism and the Austrian School in particular recognize equilibrium prices do not exist in real life, they nonetheless claim that these prices can be used as a rational basis when this is not the case, hence markets are not efficient. Robin Hahnel further argued that market inefficiencies, such as externalities and excess supply and demand, arise from buyers and sellers thoughtlessly maximizing their rational interests, which free markets inherently do not deter. Nonetheless, Hahnel commended current policies pursued by free market capitalist societies against these inefficiencies (e.g. Pigouvian taxes, antitrust laws etc.), as long as they are properly calculated and consistently enforced.

Milton Friedman agreed that markets with monopolistic competition are not efficient, but he argued that it is easy to force monopolies to adopt competitive behavior by exposing them to foreign rivals. Economic liberals and libertarian capitalists also argue that monopolies and big business are not generally the result of a free market, or that they never arise from a free market; rather, they say that such concentration is enabled by governmental grants of franchises or privileges. That said, protectionist economies can theoretically still foster competition as long as there is strong consumer switching. Joseph Schumpeter additionally argued that economic advancement, through innovation and investment, are often driven by large monopolies.

=== Equilibrium ===
Allin Cottrell, Paul Cockshott and Greg Michaelson argued that the contention that finding a true economic equilibrium is not just hard but impossible for a central planner applies equally well to a market system. As any universal Turing machine can do what any other Turing machine can, a system of dispersed calculators, i.e. a market, in principle has no advantage over a central calculator.

Don Lavoie makes a local knowledge argument by taking this implication in reverse. The market socialists pointed out the formal similarity between the neoclassical model of Walrasian general equilibrium and that of market socialism which simply replace the Walrasian auctioneer with a planning board. According to Lavoie, this emphasizes the shortcomings of the model. By relying on this formal similarity, the market socialists must adopt the simplifying assumptions of the model. The model assumes that various sorts of information are given to the auctioneer or planning board. However, if not coordinated by a capital market, this information exists in a fundamentally distributed form, which would be difficult to utilize on the planners' part. If the planners decided to utilize the information, it would immediately become stale and relatively useless, unless reality somehow imitated the changeless monotony of the equilibrium model. The existence and usability of this information depends on its creation and situation within a distributed discovery procedure.

=== Exaggerated claims ===
One criticism is that proponents of the theory overstate the strength of their case by describing socialism as impossible rather than inefficient. In explaining why he is not an Austrian School economist, anarcho-capitalist economist Bryan Caplan argues that while the economic calculation problem is a problem for socialism, he denies that Mises has shown it to be fatal or that it is this particular problem that led to the collapse of authoritarian socialist states. Caplan also states the exaggeration of the problem; in his view, Mises did not manage to prove why economic calculation made the socialist economy 'impossible', and even if there were serious doubts about the efficiency of cost benefit analysis, other arguments are plentiful (Caplan gives the example of the incentive problem).

=== Steady-state economy ===
Joan Robinson argued that in a steady-state economy there would be an effective abundance of means of production and so markets would not be needed. Mises acknowledged such a theoretical possibility in his original tract when he said the following: "The static state can dispense with economic calculation. For here the same events in economic life are ever recurring; and if we assume that the first disposition of the static socialist economy follows on the basis of the final state of the competitive economy, we might at all events conceive of a socialist production system which is rationally controlled from an economic point of view." However, he contended that stationary conditions never prevail in the real world. Changes in economic conditions are inevitable; and even if they were not, the transition to socialism would be so chaotic as to preclude the existence of such a steady-state from the start.

The purpose of the price mechanism is to allow individuals to recognise the opportunity cost of decisions. In a state of abundance, there is no such cost, which is to say that in situations where one need not economize, economics does not apply, e.g. areas with abundant fresh air and water. Otto Neurath and Hillel Ticktin argued that with detailed use of real unit accounting and demand surveys a planned economy could operate without a capital market in a situation of abundance.

=== Use of technology ===
In Towards a New Socialism's "Information and Economics: A Critique of Hayek" and "Against Mises", Paul Cockshott and Allin Cottrell argued that the use of computational technology now simplifies economic calculation and allows planning to be implemented and sustained. Len Brewster replied to this by arguing that Towards a New Socialism establishes what is essentially another form of a market economy, making the following point:

[A]n examination of C&C's New Socialism confirms Mises's conclusion that rational socialist planning is impossible. It appears that in order for economic planners to have any useful data by which they might be guided, a market must be hauled in, and with it analogues of private property, inequality and exploitation.

In response, Cockshott argued that the economic system is sufficiently far removed from a capitalist free-market economy to not count as one, saying:

Those that Hayek was arguing against like Lange and Dickinson allowed for markets in consumer goods, this did not lead Hayek to say : Oh you are not really arguing for socialism since you have conceded a market in consumer goods, he did not, because there remained huge policy differences between him and Lange even if Lange accepted consumer goods markets. It is thus a very weak argument by Brewster to say that what we advocate is not really socialist calculation because it is contaminated in some way by market influences.

Leigh Phillips' and Michal Rozworski's 2019 book The People's Republic of Walmart argues that multinational corporations like Walmart and Amazon already operate centrally planned economies in a more technologically sophisticated manner than the Soviet Union, proving that the economic calculation problem is surmountable. There are some contentions to this view however, namely how economic planning and planned economy ought to be distinguished. Both entail formulating data-driven economic objectives but the latter precludes it from occurring within a free-market context and delegates the task to centralized bodies.

One reason includes how they are dependent on Big Data, which in turn is entirely based on past information. Hence, the system cannot make any meaningful conclusions about future consumer preferences, which are required for optimal pricing. This necessitates the intervention of the programmer, who is highly likely to be biased in their judgments. Even the manner by which a system can "predict" consumer preferences is also based on a programmer's creative bias. They further argue that even if artificial intelligence is able to ordinally rank items like humans, they would still suffer from the same issues of not being able to conceive of a pricing structure where meaningful pricing calculations, using a common cardinal utility unit, can be formed. Nonetheless, Lambert and Fegley acknowledge that entrepreneurs can benefit from Big Data's predictive value, provided that the data is based on past market prices and that it is used in tandem with free market-styled bidding.

== See also ==
- Decentralized planning (economics)
- Economic planning
- Enrico Barone
- Input-output model
- Lange model
- Local knowledge problem
- Market socialism
- New Economic Policy
- Otto Neurath
- Post-scarcity economy
- Production for use
- Real prices and ideal prices
- Red Plenty
- Self-managed economy
- Socialism
- Socialist calculation debate
- Socialization (economics)
- Tax choice
- Transition economy
- Why Socialism?

== Bibliography ==
- Boettke, Peter 1990 The Political Economy of Soviet Socialism.
- Caldwell, B: 1997. Hayek and Socialism The Journal of Economic Literature V35 pp. 1856–1890.
- Cottrell, Allin and Cockshott W. Paul "Calculation, Complexity and Planning: The Socialist Calculation Debate Once Again" Review of Political Economy
- Cox, Robin 2005, "The Economic Calculation Controversy: Unravelling of a Myth".
- Dickinson H. D. 1933 Price Formation in a Socialist Community in The Economic Journal.
- Dickinson, H. D. 1939 The Economics of Socialism.
- Hayek, F. A. 1935 Collectivist Economic Planning.
- Hayek F. A. 1937 Economics and Knowledge Economica V4 N13 pp. 33–54.
- Hayek F. A. 1940 The Competitive "Solution" Economica V7 N26 pp. 125–149.
- Hayek, F. A. The Road to Serfdom.
- Hayek, F. A. 1945 "The Use of Knowledge in Society" The American Economic Review.
- Hayek, F. A. 1952 The Counter Revolution of Science.
- Dickinson, H. D. (1933). "Price Formation in a Socialist Community". The Economic Journal. 43 (170): 237–250. doi:10.2307/2224464. JSTOR 2224464.
- von Hayek, F. A. (1937). "Economics and Knowledge". Economica. 4 (13): 33–54. doi:10.2307/2548786. JSTOR 2548786.
- v. Hayek, F. A. (1940). "Socialist Calculation: The Competitive 'Solution'". Economica. 7 (26): 125–149. doi:10.2307/2548692. JSTOR 2548692. S2CID 155934601.
- Lachmann, L: 1978 Capital and Its Structure. Sheed, Andrews, and McMeel, Kansas City.
- Lange, Oskar (1936). "On the Economic Theory of Socialism: Part One". The Review of Economic Studies. 4 (1): 53–71. doi:10.2307/2967660. JSTOR 2967660.
- Lange, Oskar (1937). "On the Economic Theory of Socialism: Part Two". The Review of Economic Studies. 4 (2): 123–142. doi:10.2307/2967609. JSTOR 2967609.
- Lange, Oskar (1987). "The Economic Operation of a Socialist Society: Ii". Contributions to Political Economy. 6: 13–24. doi:10.1093/oxfordjournals.cpe.a035712.
- Lange, Oscar 1967 The Computer and the Market in Socialism, Capitalism, and Economic Growth Feinstein Ed.
- Lavoie, Don: 1981. A Critique of the Standard Account of the Socialist Calculation Debate Journal of Libertarian Studies N5 V1 pp. 41-87.
- Lerner, A. P. (1934). "Economic Theory and Socialist Economy". The Review of Economic Studies. 2 (1): 51–61. doi:10.2307/2967550. JSTOR 2967550.
- Lerner, A. P. (1936). "A Note on Socialist Economics". The Review of Economic Studies. 4 (1): 72–76. doi:10.2307/2967661. JSTOR 2967661.
- Lerner, A. P. (1937). "Statics and Dynamics in Socialist Economics". The Economic Journal. 47 (186): 253–270. doi:10.2307/2225526. JSTOR 2225526.
- Lerner, A. P. (1938). "Theory and Practice in Socialist Economics". The Review of Economic Studies. 6 (1): 71–75. doi:10.2307/2967541. JSTOR 2967541.
- MacKenzie, D. W. 2006 "Oskar Lange and the Impossibility of Economic Calculation". Studia Economicze.
- Mises L. E. 1912 The Theory of Money and Credit.
- Mises L. E. 1920 Economic Calculation in the Socialist Commonwealth, reprinted in Hayek (1935).
- Mises L. E. 1922 [1936] Socialism: An Economic and Sociological Analysis.
- Mises 1933 Planned Economy and Socialism; reprinted in Selected Writings of Ludwig von Mises, The Liberty Fund (2002) Richard M Ebeling ed.
- Mises L. E. 1944 Bureaucracy.
- Mises L. E. 1944 Omnipotent Government.
- Mises L. E. 1949 Human Action.
- Mises L. E. 1957 Theory and History.
- Roemer, John (1994). A Future for Socialism, Verso Press.
- Rothbard, M. N. 1991. The End of Socialism and the Calculation Debate Revisited. The Review of Austrian Economics.
- Spufford, Francis. 2010 Red Plenty, Faber & Faber.
- Stiglitz, J: 1994. Whither Socialism? MIT Press.
- Vaughn, Karen. 1980. Economic Calculation under Socialism: The Austrian Contribution. Economic Inquiry 18 pp. 535–554.
- Yunker, James A. "Post-Lange Market Socialism" 1995, Journal of Economic Issues.
