= Bureaucracy (disambiguation) =

Bureaucracy is an organizational structure with the task of implementing the decisions and policies of its governing body.

Bureaucracy may also refer to:

- Bureaucracy, one of the five seasons of the Discordian calendar
- Bureaucracy (book), a 1945 political treatise by Ludwig von Mises
- Bureaucracy (video game), a 1987 Infocom game by Douglas Adams
- Bureaucracy: What Government Agencies Do and Why They Do It, a 1989 book by James Q. Wilson
- Celestial bureaucracy, the pantheon of Chinese mythology
- Red tape, excessive regulation or adherence to standardized procedure
- Street-level bureaucracy, individuals who implement laws and public policies

== See also ==
- Bureaucrat
- Byzantine aristocracy and bureaucracy
- Civil service
- Public administration
- Red tape
