= Socialism (disambiguation) =

Socialism is a political philosophy and economic system.

Socialism may also refer to:

- Scientific socialism, a method of analysis pioneered by Karl Marx and Friedrich Engels and used to analyze capitalism, where socialism is postulated to emerge from capitalist development; in the late 19th century it widely became known as Marxism
- Socialist mode of production, a more specific concept of socialist organization articulated by Marxist theory of historical materialism
- Socialist Party, the policies and practices of titular Socialist political parties irrespective of whether or not they adhere to the implementation of a socialist system
  - List of socialist parties, variations on the above
- Socialist state, a country governed by a socialist party with the constitutional aim of constructing socialism
- Real socialism, an ideological catchphrase for the Soviet-type planned economies in the former Soviet Union and Eastern Bloc

== Media ==
- Socialism, a book by John Stuart Mill
- Socialism (book), a book by Ludwig von Mises
- Socialism: Utopian and Scientific, an essay by Friedrich Engels
- Film Socialisme, a 2010 film directed by Jean-Luc Godard
- "SOCiALiSM", a 2017 single by the Japanese idol group BiS
