= The People's Republic of Walmart =

2019 book

The People's Republic of Walmart: How the World's Biggest Corporations are Laying the Foundation for Socialism
- Author: Leigh Phillips and Michal Rozworski
- Language: English
- Publisher: Verso Books
- Publication date: March 2019
- Publication place: United States

The People's Republic of Walmart: How the World's Biggest Corporations are Laying the Foundation for Socialism is a 2019 book by socialists Leigh Phillips and Michal Rozworski, published by Verso Books. In the book, Phillips and Rozworski argue that large multinational corporations, such as Walmart, are not expressions of free-market capitalism but instead examples of central planning on a large scale. They also argue that the question is not if large-scale planning can work, but if it can be made democratic to serve everyone's needs.

== Reception ==
Boing Boing praised the book's vision as "audacious and exciting," adding that the authors "have outdone themselves with this volume." The New Statesmen called the book "a timely exhortation to rethink the wisdom that markets always do it better." The Vancouver Sun said that the book is proof that "socialists can have a sense of humour – and make sense" and that both "Already committed socialists ... and general readers" will find much here to provoke thought, and even hope."

American Affairs described the book as "refreshingly frank, funny, and bold. It's almost enough to convert the reader to their can-do optimism. But the book merely suggests, rather than shows, how to cure the chief defects of both public and private sector gigantism. Its intellectual history of failed projects of both nationalization and marketization is fascinating in its own right, but it does not rise above the detached idealism that sank such visions in the first place. In this way, The People's Republic of Walmart embodies the same impractical ideology that it so ably critiques."

Countercurrents.org, not to be confused with the White nationalist journal Counter-Currents, said that the book shows that "The good news is that planning actually works. It works for Amazon, and it works for Walmart. The bad news, however, is that corporate planning works within the confines of capitalism's profit-maximizing system that damages our earth. The eternal quest for profit maximization has pushed corporate planning to achieve remarkable efficiencies in production, logistics, resource use, and the exploitation of human labor. Still, long-range democratic planning might be able to end poverty wages, stop climate busting production methods, and end senseless over-consumption." The review concluded by saying that "What we need is a global People's Republic of Ecological Planning. Unless we achieve this, the survival of humanity is by no means assured."

Morning Star called the style of the book "high energy, switching from clear, technical exposition to purple prose and street slang." and praised the book as "provocative and lively," but added that "It is mildly frustrating that no specific solutions are offered in relation to getting the right people and the control systems in place to run the system, that requires further reading in other disciplines."

In the Quarterly Journal of Austrian Economics, Márton Kónya criticized the book, arguing that it confuses economic planning - i.e. the necessary process of any economic actor to choose between means and ends - within large corporations, with an entirely planned economy. Using the economic calculation argument of Ludwig von Mises, he claims that the real difficulty in economic planning is not the volume of resources necessary to distribute, but the choice between the almost infinite possible combinations of means with which human needs can be satisfied. Thus, even though megacorporations have control over huge volumes of resources, fundamentally the only means-ends planning decision that they carry out in the economy concerns retailing, or simply connecting producers and consumers. Production and consumption decisions are still made by the respective producers and consumers. He rejects megacorporations as analogies for a planned economy on the basis that megacorporations, despite selling an impressive volume and variety of goods, don't themselves make the production and distribution decisions. According to him, it is the insurmountable complexity of these decisions that make a marketless planned economy impossible to operate.
