= Local knowledge problem =

Argument in economics

In economics, the local knowledge problem is the argument that the information required for rational economic planning is distributed among individual actors and thus unavoidably exists outside the knowledge of a central authority. Economist Friedrich Hayek said that "practically every individual has some advantage over all others because he possesses unique information of which beneficial use might be made, but of which use can be made only if the decisions depending on it are left to him or are made with his active cooperation", while Leonid Hurwicz stated that there is no incentive for people to share this information truthfully with a central authority.

== Friedrich Hayek's description ==
Friedrich Hayek described this distributed local knowledge as such:

Today it is almost heresy to suggest that scientific knowledge is not the sum of all knowledge. But a little reflection will show that there is beyond question a body of very important but unorganized knowledge which cannot possibly be called scientific in the sense of knowledge of general rules: the knowledge of the particular circumstances of time and place. It is with respect to this that practically every individual has some advantage over all others because he possesses unique information of which beneficial use might be made, but of which use can be made only if the decisions depending on it are left to him or are made with his active cooperation. We need to remember only how much we have to learn in any occupation after we have completed our theoretical training, how big a part of our working life we spend learning particular jobs, and how valuable an asset in all walks of life is knowledge of people, of local conditions, and of special circumstances. To know of and put to use a machine not fully employed, or somebody's skill which could be better utilized, or to be aware of a surplus stock which can be drawn upon during an interruption of supplies, is socially quite as useful as the knowledge of better alternative techniques. And the shipper who earns his living from using otherwise empty or half-filled journeys of tramp-steamers, or the estate agent whose whole knowledge is almost exclusively one of temporary opportunities, or the arbitrageur who gains from local differences of commodity prices, are all performing eminently useful functions based on special knowledge of circumstances of the fleeting moment not known to others.

Because, while incomplete, this distributed knowledge is essential to economic planning, its necessity is cited as evidence in support of the argument that economic planning must be performed in a similarly distributed fashion by individual actors. In other words, according to Hayek, economic planning by a central actor (e.g. a government bureaucracy or a central bank) necessarily lacks this information because statistical aggregates cannot accurately account for the universe of local knowledge:

One reason why economists are increasingly apt to forget about the constant small changes which make up the whole economic picture is probably their growing preoccupation with statistical aggregates, which show a very much greater stability than the movements of the detail. The comparative stability of the aggregates cannot, however, be accounted for—as the statisticians occasionally seem to be inclined to do—by the "law of large numbers" or the mutual compensation of random changes. The number of elements with which we have to deal is not large enough for such accidental forces to produce stability. The continuous flow of goods and services is maintained by constant deliberate adjustments, by new dispositions made every day in the light of circumstances not known the day before, by B stepping in at once when A fails to deliver. Even the large and highly mechanized plant keeps going largely because of an environment upon which it can draw for all sorts of unexpected needs; tiles for its roof, stationery for its forms, and all the thousand and one kinds of equipment in which it cannot be self-contained and which the plans for the operation of the plant require to be readily available in the market.

As such, the local knowledge problem is a microeconomic counterargument to macroeconomic arguments that favor central planning and regulation of economic activity.

== See also ==
- Economic calculation problem
- Civic crowdfunding
- Dispersed knowledge
- Tax choice
