= Enrico Barone =

Italian economist and military historian (1859–1924)

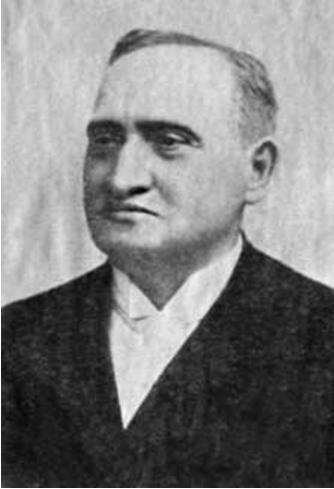
Enrico Barone

Enrico Barone (Italian: [baˈroːne]; 22 December 1859, Naples, Kingdom of the Two Sicilies – 14 May 1924, Rome, Italy) was a soldier, military historian, and an economist.

== Biography ==
Barone studied the classics and mathematics before becoming an army officer. He taught military history for eight years from 1894 at the Officers' Training School. There he wrote a series of influential historical military works. In these he employed a method of successive approximations to which his study in economics had introduced him. In 1902, he became head of the historical office of the General Staff. He resigned his commission in 1906.

From 1894 he collaborated with Maffeo Pantaleoni and Vilfredo Pareto in the Giornale degli Economisti.

== Impact ==
He was the first to state conditions under which a competitive market would be Pareto efficient. He introduced variable factor proportions into neoclassical economics, contributing to the marginal-productivity theory of factor-income distribution. He extended conditions of general equilibrium in Walrasian theory, suggesting the feasibility of trial-and-error movement to market equilibrium. He pioneered the economic theory of index numbers. His contributions were made without use of utility or even indifference curves.

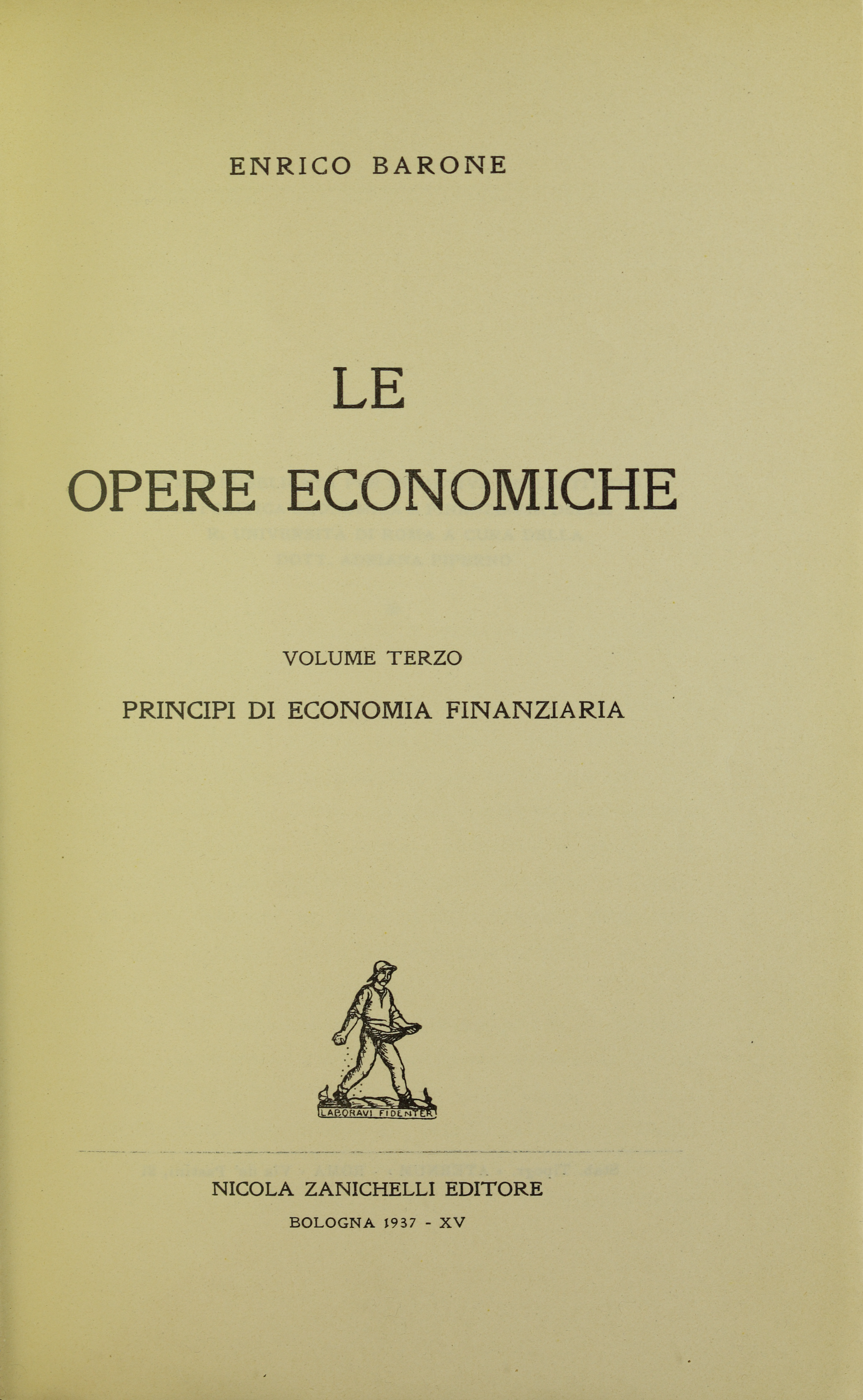
Principi di economia finanziaria, 1937

Barone has been described as a "founder of the pure theory of a socialist economy." In 1908, he presented a mathematical model for a socialist economy under which certain relations, later identified with shadow prices, must be satisfied for "maximum collective welfare." The latter corresponds to least-cost-price of production from Pareto efficiency reached in competitive equilibrium. He stressed that such a result could not be arrived at a priori but only by experimentation on a large scale with great demands on data collection, even assuming unchanging productive conditions. In this, he suggested that movement toward economic efficiency in a socialist economy was not inconceivable, outlining two types of socialism: a centralized and decentralized model. For such regimes, whatever the distribution rule for output and income adopted by the Ministry of Production, the same economic categories would reappear for prices, salaries, interest, rent, profits, saving, etc., though perhaps with different names. His analysis and the Austrian School economists' responses, fueled discussion of the economic calculation problem and market socialism in the 1930s. His method also anticipated Abram Bergson's seminal formulation of a social welfare function three decades later.
