= The General Idea of the Revolution in the Nineteenth Century =

Manifesto written in 1851 by Pierre-Joseph Proudhon

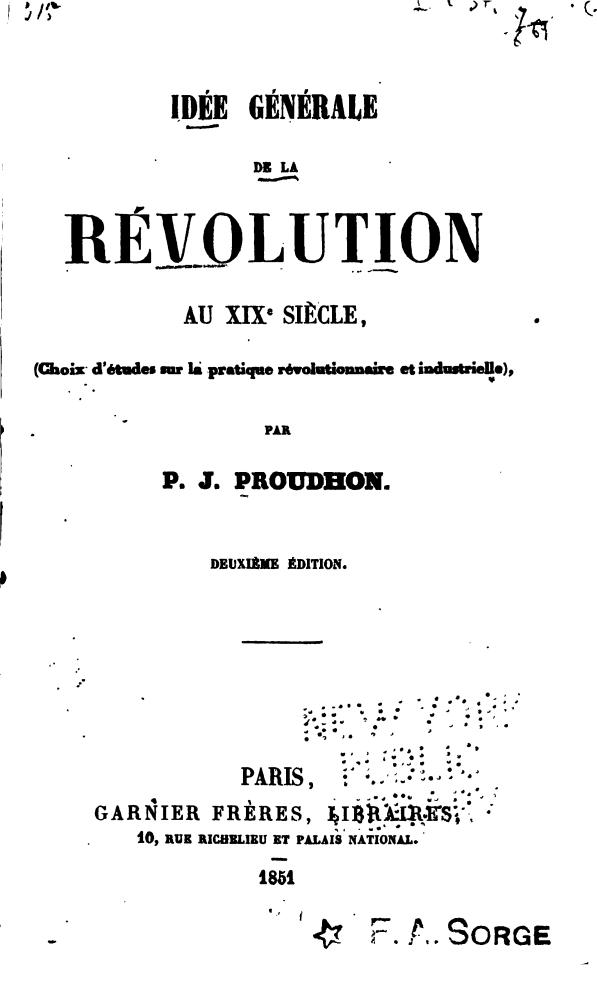
- French edition title page
- Author: Pierre-Joseph Proudhon
- Original title: dée générale de la révolution au XIXe siècle
- Language: French
- Publication date: 1851

The General Idea of the Revolution in the Nineteenth Century (French: Idée générale de la révolution au XIXe siècle) is an influential manifesto written in 1851 by the anarchist philosopher Pierre-Joseph Proudhon. The book portrays a vision of an ideal society where frontiers are taken down, nation states abolished, and where there is no central authority or law of government, except for power residing in communes, and local associations, governed by contractual law. The ideas of the book later became the basis of libertarian and anarchist theory, and the work is now considered a classic of anarchist philosophy.

It was published in July 1851, its first edition of 3,000 copies soon selling out, with a second edition following in August. At the time, Proudhon was still serving the last year of a prison sentence begun in 1849, for criticizing Louis-Napoléon Bonaparte as a reactionary.

The central theme of the book is the historical necessity of revolution, and the impossibility of preventing it. Even the forces of reaction produce revolution by making the revolution more conscious of itself, as the reactionaries resort to ever more brutal methods to suppress the inevitable. Proudhon stresses that it is the exploitative nature of capitalism that creates the need for government, and that revolutionaries must change society by changing its economic basis. Then the authoritarian form of government will become superfluous.

He proposes that the Bank of France be turned into a 'Bank of Exchange', an autonomous democratic institution rather than a state-controlled monopoly. Railways and large industry should be given to the workers themselves. His vision of a future is a society made up of self-governing, democratic organizations, with no central authority controlling them.
