= Paul Cockshott =

Scottish computer scientist and Marxist economist (born 1952)

William Paul Cockshott
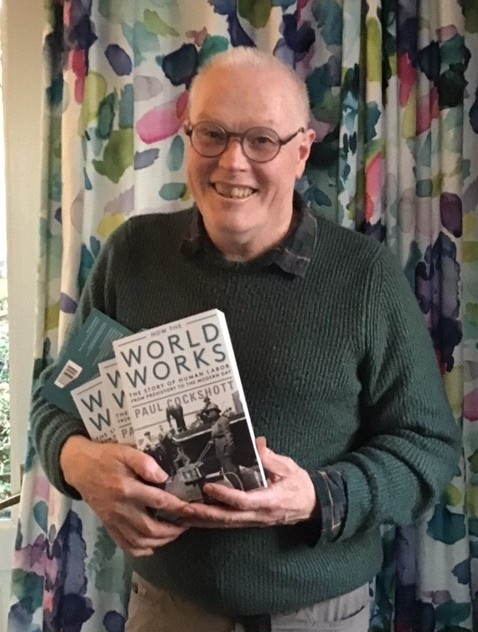
- Born: 16 March 1952 (age 74); Edinburgh, Scotland, United Kingdom
- Education: Manchester University (BaEcon); Heriot Watt University (MSc); Edinburgh University (PhD)
- Scientific career
- Fields: Computer science Marxian economics
- Workplaces: University of Glasgow
- Website: paulcockshott.wordpress.com

William Paul Cockshott (born 16 March 1952) is a Scottish academic in the fields of computer science and Marxist economics. He is a Reader at the University of Glasgow. Since 1993, he has authored multiple works in the tradition of scientific socialism, most notably Towards a New Socialism and How the World Works. Cockshott advocates for a moneyless economy and the use of computers to aid a planned economy.

== Scientific career ==
Cockshott earned a BA in economics (1974) from Manchester University, an MSc (1976) in computer science from Heriot Watt University and a PhD in computer science from Edinburgh University (1982).

He has made contributions in the fields of image compression, 3D television, parallel compilers and medical imaging, but became known to a wider audience for his proposals in the multi-disciplinary area of economic computability, most notably as co-author, along the economist Allin F. Cottrell, of the book Towards a New Socialism, in which they strongly advocate the use of cybernetics for efficient and democratic planning of a complex socialist economy.

He proposes a moneyless socialist economy, akin to Karl Marx's description of a socialist society in Critique of the Gotha Programme, realized by today's computer technology:

In our proposal people would be paid not in money but with nontransferable electronic work accounts. Purchases would be made with smart cards as they are today, but with the difference that the only way people could accumulate work credits would be by actually working. The more hours you work the more credits you get. Goods in the shops would then be priced in hours, and the exchange principle is basically one for one. For one hour of work you get goods that took one hour to make.

— Paul Cockshott, How the World Works

== Political views ==
In the 1970s, Cockshott was a member of the British and Irish Communist Organisation (B&ICO), but he and several other members became unhappy with B&ICO's position on workers' control, claiming that it promoted power over the proletariat at their workplace rather than giving power to the proletariat. Cockshott and several other B&ICO members resigned and formed a new party, the Communist Organisation in the British Isles, until its dissolution in 1980.

Cockshott advocates for a system of a moneyless economy based on a computerized planned economy and direct democracy, a form of technologist socialist planning. He has criticized the economic calculation problem on the grounds that planning can be made feasible via computerization and allocation based on labor time.

== Published works ==
- Cockshott, W. P. (1990). Ps-Algol Implementations: Applications in Persistent Object Oriented Programming, Ellis Horwood Ltd. ISBN 978-0745808277
- Cockshott, W. P. (1990). A Compiler Writer's Toolbox: Interactive Compilers for PCs With Turbo Pascal, Ellis Horwood Ltd. ISBN 978-0131737907
- Cockshott, W. P., Cottrell, A. (1993). Towards a New Socialism, Spokesman. ISBN 978-0851245454
- Cockshott, W. P., Renfrew K. (2004). SIMD Programming Manual for Linux and Windows, Springer. ISBN 978-1852337940
- Cockshott, W. P. (2010). Transition to 21st Century Socialism in the European Union, Lulu. ISBN 978-1445715070
- Cockshott, W. P. (2011). Glasgow Pascal Compiler with vector extensions, Lulu. ISBN 978-1447761563
- Cockshott, W. P., Zachariah, D. (2012). Arguments for Socialism, Lulu. ISBN 978-1471658945
- Cockshott, W. P., Cottrell, A., Michaelson, G., Wright, I., Yakovenko, V. (2012). Classical Econophysics, Routledge. ISBN 978-0415696463
- Cockshott, W. P., Mackenzie, L., Michaelson, G. (2015). Computation and its Limits, Oxford University Press. ISBN 978-0198729129
- Cockshott, W. P., Nieto, M. (2017). Ciber-Comunismo Planificación Económica, Computadoras Y Democracia, Editorial Trotta. ISBN 978-84-9879-721-3
- Cockshott, W. P. (2019). How the World Works: The Story of Human Labor from Prehistory to the Modern Day, Monthly Review Press. ISBN 978-1-58367-777-3
- Cockshott, W. P., Dapprich J. P., Cottrell A. (2022). Economic Planning in an Age of Climate Crisis, self-published. ISBN 979-8357728739
- Cockshott, W. P., Kolozova K., Michaelson G. (2024). Defending Materialism: The Uneasy History of the Atom in Science and Philosophy, Bloomsbury Publishing. ISBN 9781350447349
