= Towards a New Socialism =

1993 Marxist economics book

- Author: William Paul Cockshott and Allin F. Cottrell
- Language: English
- Subject: Socialist planning; Cybernetics; Marxian economics; Marxism
- Genre: Economics
- Publisher: Spokesman Books
- Publication place: England
- ISBN: 978-0851245454

Towards a New Socialism is a 1993 non-fiction book written by Scottish computer scientist Paul Cockshott, co-authored by Scottish economics professor Allin F. Cottrell. The book outlines in detail a proposal for a complex planned socialist economy, taking inspiration from cybernetics, the works of Karl Marx, and British operations research scientist Stafford Beer's 1973 model of a distributed decision support system dubbed Project Cybersyn. Aspects of a socialist society such as direct democracy, foreign trade and property relations are also explored. The book is, in the authors' words, "our attempt to answer the idea that socialism is dead and buried after the demise of the Soviet Union."

The book was covered in an article in Süddeutsche Zeitung in 2017, as well as reviewed by Leonard Brewster in the Spring 2004 issue of the Quarterly Journal of Austrian Economics.

== Contents ==
The book is divided into 15 chapters, excluding the introduction:

1. Inequality
2. Eliminating Inequalities
3. Work, Time and Computers
4. Basic Concepts of Planning
5. Strategic Planning
6. Detailed Planning
7. Macroeconomic Planning
8. The Marketing of Consumer Goods
9. Planning and Information
10. Foreign Trade
11. Trade Between Socialist Countries
12. The Commune
13. On Democracy
14. Property Relations
15. Some Contrary Views Considered

== Ideas presented ==
The main features distinguishing Cottrell and Cockshott's ideas from other socialist tendencies are:

1. A rigorous theoretical defense of economic planning
2. The use of non-circulating labor money to replace circulating currency
3. Athenian-style participatory democracy, specifically the use of sortition rather than election to fill as many political offices as possible

Each of these represented major divergences from what was then the main currents of socialist opinion. The fall of the Soviet Union had convinced many socialists that economic planning was to be abandoned. Cottrell and Cockshott in contrast argued that new computer technology plus participatory democracy was actually making economic planning possible to greater extent than ever, a fact that would be noted in other books on economic planning in Japan and private industry. Marx considered non-circulated labor credits as crucial for socialism in his work Critique of the Gotha Program (while critiquing incompetent attempts to implement them), and an earlier generation of socialists (notably Edward Bellamy in his popular 19th century book Looking Backwards), had advocated for them. But after Friedrich Engels' death, Karl Kautsky moved the socialist movement away the idea in the early 1900s, leading (among other things) to labor money never being implemented in the USSR (given Kautsky's substantial influence on Lenin's socialist organizing). Under Cottrell and Cockshott's labor credits idea, someone working 8 hours a day would receive 8 hours credit, goods and services would be priced in terms of the labor required to make them, prices would be adjusted upward/downward in accordance with supply and demand, and labor money would cancel out rather than circulate when used for a purchase. The idea incorporated the work from the growing field of econophysics, specifically the work of Israeli mathematicians Emmanuel Farjoun and Moshe Machover, whose book Laws of Chaos empirically demonstrated that labor content was responsible for around 95% of a good's price. Years later, University of Maryland econophysicist Victor Yakovenko would demonstrate that circulating money inherently creates an unequal Gibbs-Boltzmann distribution within an economy, even when beginning from conditions of perfect equality.

The emphasis on Athenian democracy stemmed from a desire to avoid the Iron Law of Oligarchy, a tendency noted by Robert Michels for the leadership of an organization to turn even democratic organizations into a dictatorship if given the chance. According to Cottrell and Cockshott, Lenin's failure to account for this tendency in State and Revolution (published in 1917) meant the Soviet Union was never able to find a stable democratic form of government, thus degenerating by Stalin's time into a stable but authoritarian one-party state. This dictatorship further distorted the Soviet economy, as major economic decisions were made by a political elite with little input or consideration of the larger population's needs, resulting in the classic hallmarks of the Soviet economy: Rapid advancement in areas like space exploration and weaponry favored by the political establishment, widespread shortages of consumer goods, and the failure of the Soviet government to develop an early Internet after the main proponents of the project fell out of favor with Communist Party leadership in the Brezhnev era. Athenian Democracy avoids this outcome by choosing political leaders on the basis of lot rather than election. Quoting Aristotle, Cottrell and Cockshott note that elections have an aristocratic tendency that has been recognized since Ancient Athens: voting for whoever one thinks is the best usually means voting for whoever has the most money, status, or education to convince voters that they're "the best." For this reason, Democratic Athens selected their legislature, judiciary, and executive branch officials entirely by lot, reserving elections only for military generals where specific skills in the military arts were required. Cottrell and Cockshott call for a restoration of this democratic practice, arguing that it is the only way to eliminate the barrier between ruler and ruled, and prevent the rulers from forming a caste increasingly separate from the rest of the population.

== Reception ==
Leonard Brewster, Ph.D., reviewed the book in the Spring 2004 issue of the Quarterly Journal of Austrian Economics, positing that "Cockshott and Cottrell have come as close to developing a serious, up-to-date version of a neo-Marxist political economy as we are likely to see." Brewster concedes that C&C have "succeeded in countering a version of the calculation argument" but writes that this "ironically clarifies and strengthens the reasons for considering socialist calculation not just as troublesome, but impossible, and valuation in terms of labor an illusion." Furthermore, Brewster argues that C&C's allowance of a market for consumer goods, in effect, makes their model a "capitalistic, commodity producing society."

In 2009, Cockshott published an article entitled "Notes for a Critique of Brewster" in which he responded to Brewster's arguments against the book's model. Cockshott asserts that Brewster is "wrong in saying that our labour values are no longer labour values since they are now influenced by market prices", arguing that the distortion of labour value ratios, manifesting through exchange value ratios in capitalist economies, is a short-term artefact of supply and demand imbalances. Furthermore, Cockshott argues that maintaining these distinctions in his model does not "[prevent] labour values from being usable for economic calculation when dealing with intermediate goods." Summarising, Cockshott asserts that "we argue that the market has a place, but only a limited place. It should be restricted to consumer goods, and even here, market indicators are not the ultima ratio. They are just one among many constraints that society has to recognise."
