= Bureaucracy (book) =

1944 book by Ludwig von Mises

- First edition (UK)
- Author: Ludwig von Mises
- Language: English
- Subject: Politics & Economics
- Genre: Non-fiction
- Publisher: Yale University Press (US); William Hodge & Co (UK)
- Publication date: 1944, 1962
- Publication place: United States
- Media type: Print (Hardback & Paperback)
- Pages: 148
- ISBN: 0-86597-663-5
- OCLC: 349030

Bureaucracy is a political book written by Austrian School economist and libertarian thinker Ludwig von Mises. The author's motivation in writing the book is his concern with the spread of socialist ideals and the increasing bureaucratization of economic life. While he does not deny the necessity of certain bureaucratic structures for the smooth operation of any civilized state, he disagrees with the extent to which it has come to dominate the public life of European countries and the United States. The author's purpose is to demonstrate that the negative aspects of bureaucracy are not a result of bad policies or corruption, as the public tends to think. Instead, he explains, those problems are necessarily built into bureaucratic structures. They are due to the very tasks such a system has to deal with. The main body of the book is therefore devoted to a comparison between private enterprise on the one hand and bureaucratic agencies/public enterprise on the other.

== Private enterprise vs. bureaucratic agencies ==
Private enterprises are managed on the sole basis of the profit criterion. A company's sole purpose is to increase revenue while minimizing cost, as reflected in the profit and loss accounts and other accounting tools. Companies or company branches that operate on a loss must either reform or shut down. Due to these simple facts it is relatively easy to devolve responsibilities from company headquarters to the various branches, no matter how large the company might be. Headquarters gives the branch manager a free hand to operate his concern as he sees fit so long as he returns a profit. In this way initiative and innovation are not only permitted but even encouraged and rewarded.

It is quite a different matter when it comes to public services and other bureaucratic structures. A structure like the FBI or an embassy in a foreign country has no criterion of efficiency that is anywhere nearly as easily evaluated as the profit criterion. 'Success' here is a more vague concept, and one that is more open to subjective interpretation. Precisely because the product of public services has no price on the market, the traditional tools of management that have proven successful in private enterprise (scientific management, time studies etc.) cannot be applied in the public sphere. To 'increase output' and 'minimize production time' are concepts that cannot be applied to something like a police department. But an even more important consequence of the absence of the profit criterion is the necessity of centralizing administration and restricting the freedom of the branch or department manager: since his performance cannot be easily assessed in monetary terms, the safest way to prevent excesses and the abuse of power is to ensure everyone adheres to the government's directives. Thus the most important quality of the successful bureaucrat is obeying orders.

== Private enterprise vs. publicly owned enterprises ==
In contrast to private enterprises, government-owned corporation or municipality owned enterprises are not always or even usually managed on the basis of the profit motive. A deficit in this latter case does not spell the end of the enterprise or even the beginning of reforms, because it is generally assumed that the reason the enterprise exists is to 'render useful services to the public' (i.e. employ a large part of the local population as its workforce or charge an artificially low price for its products or services), not become a slave of the profit motive. For this reason enterprises that are in the red are allowed to operate for years or decades, with the result being that its losses are eventually passed on to every citizen.

But as von Mises asserts, to disregard the profit motive is not, as is widely believed, to serve the public better. On the contrary, to operate under the restraints of the profit criterion is the best way to serve the public interest:

With private profit-seeking enterprise this problem is solved by the attitudes of the public. The proof of the usefulness of the services rendered is that a sufficient number of citizens is ready to pay the price asked for them. Under [a given] price the production of [a commodity] tends to expand until saturation is reached, that is, until a further expansion would withdraw factors of production from branches of industry for whose products the demand of the consumers is more intense. In taking the profit-motive as a guide, free enterprise adjusts its activities to the desires of the public. The profit motive pushes every entrepreneur to accomplish those services that the consumers deem the most urgent. But if a public enterprise is to be operated without regard to profits, the behaviour of the public no longer provides a criterion of its usefulness [...]
A private enterprise is doomed if its operation brings losses only and no way can be found to remedy this situation. Its unprofitability is the proof of the fact that the customers disallow it. There is, with private enterprise, no means of defying this verdict of the public and of keeping on. The manager of a plant involving a loss may explain and excuse the failure. But such apologies are of no avail; they cannot prevent the final abandonment of the unsuccessful project. It is different with a public enterprise. Here the appearance of the deficit is not considered a proof of failure. The manager is not responsible for it. It is the aim of his boss, the government, to sell at such a low price that a loss becomes unavoidable. (pp. 76–77)

== Publication history ==
- Yale University Press (US), William Hodge & Company (UK), 1945.
- Libertarian Press, 1962. (2nd edition)
- Liberty Fund, 2007, ISBN 0-86597-663-5 (cloth), ISBN 0-86597-664-3 (paper)

== See also ==
- Laissez-faire
- Anti-Communism
