= Price mechanism =

Concept in economics

In economics, a price mechanism refers to the way in which price determines the allocation of resources and influences the quantity supplied and the quantity demanded of goods and services. The price mechanism, part of a market system, functions in various ways to match up buyers and sellers: as an incentive, a signal, and a rationing system for resources.

The price mechanism is an economic model where price plays a key role in directing the activities of producers, consumers, and resource suppliers. An example of a price mechanism uses announced buy and sell prices. Generally speaking, when two parties wish to engage in trade, the purchaser will announce a price he is willing to pay (the offer price) and the seller will announce a price he is willing to accept (the sell price).

The primary advantage of such a method is that conditions are laid out in advance, and transactions can proceed with no further permission or authorization from any participant. When any bid and ask pair are compatible, a transaction occurs, in most cases automatically.

Samuelson wrote that "the price mechanism, working through supply and demand in competitive markets, operates to (simultaneously) answer the three fundamental problems of economic organization in our mixed private enterprise system..." and establish an equilibrium system of prices and production. At competitive equilibrium, the value society places on a good is equivalent to the value of the resources given up to produce it (marginal benefit equals marginal cost). This ensures allocative efficiency: the additional value society places on another unit of the good is equal to what society must give up in resources to produce it.

== Working of the price mechanism ==
Under a price mechanism, if demand increases, prices will rise, causing a movement along the supply curve.

For example: the oil crisis of the 1970s drove oil prices dramatically upwards, which in turn caused several countries to begin producing oil domestically.

A price mechanism affects every economic situation in the long term. Price Mechanism plays a vital role in determining prices in a capitalist economy. An example of the effects of a price mechanism, in the long run, involves fuel for cars. If fuel becomes more expensive, then the demand for fuel would not decrease fast but eventually, companies will start to produce alternatives such as biodiesel fuel and electrical cars. A price mechanism is a system by which the allocation of resources and distribution of goods and services are made on the basis of relative market price. There are two important elements of price mechanism – 1. PRICES - prices are essence of price mechanism. Price mechanism works through prices in a free enterprise economy, where all goods and services carry price tags with them. A whole set of prices prevail in such an economy. Goods and services are available at a price because it involves cost in producing these goods and services. Consumers have to pay some prices if they want to buy some goods like food, clothes, etc. Producers are willing to sell goods and services only if they get the appropriate price. 2. MARKET - forces of demand and supply operate within the framework of market. Market constitute an integral part of the price mechanism A market means a system or a set-up in which the buyers and sellers of the commodity are able to interact and communicate with each other and strike a deal, i.e., price and the quantity to be bought and sold.

== Auctions ==
An auction is a price mechanism where bidders can make competing offers for a good. The minimum bid may or may not be set by the seller, who may choose to predetermine a minimum asking price. The highest bidder would be awarded the transaction.

== Other applications ==
If the terms "pay" and "sell" are understood very generally, then, a very broad range of applications and different market systems can be enabled this way. Internet dating for instance could be based on offers to talk for a period of time, accepted by those who are compensated not in money but in additional credits to keep using the system. Or, a political party could trade support for different measures in a platform, perhaps using allocation voting to "bid" a certain amount of support for a measure that a leader has "asked" them to support: if the measure has enough support in the party, the leader will proceed; a very explicit model of so-called "political capital".

Though there are many concerns about liquidating any given transaction, even in a conventional market, there are ideologies which hold that the risks are outweighed by the efficient rendezvous. In greenhouse gas emissions trading, companies doing the "bidding" argue that Earth's atmosphere can be seen as affected almost uniformly by emissions anywhere on Earth. They argue further that, as a result, there are almost no local effects, and only a measurable and widely agreed climate change effect, of a greenhouse gas emission, justifying a "cap and trade" approach. Somewhat more controversially, the approach was applied even earlier to sulfur dioxide emissions in the United States, and was quite successful in reducing overall smog output there.

In most applications of such methods, however, the comprehensive outcome of the transaction is not so easily measured or universally agreed. Some theorists assert that, with appropriate controls, a market mechanism can replace a hierarchy, even a command hierarchy, by ordering actions for which the highest bid is received:

So price mechanism is a technique by which inflation is controlled. The price can only be increased if the supply is less and has more demand for the same.

Less controversial applications of bid and ask matching include:

- industrial process control
- various applications in social networks (including dating above)
- calculating interest in court judgments or homestead credit
- determining which of several assets in a divorce are most prized by each party, and accordingly, who should receive what for maximum amiability and minimum capital asset sale and lifestyle disruption

== See also ==
- Price signal
- Price system
