= Socialism (book) =

1922 book by Ludwig von Mises

Socialism: An Economic and Sociological Analysis
- First edition (German)
- Author: Ludwig von Mises
- Original title: Die Gemeinwirtschaft: Untersuchungen über den Sozialismus
- Translator: J. Kahane
- Language: German
- Subject: Anti-socialism
- Publisher: Gustav Fischer Verlag, Liberty Fund, Ludwig von Mises Institute
- Publication date: 1922
- Publication place: Weimar Germany
- English publication date: 1936
- Pages: 596

Socialism: An Economic and Sociological Analysis is a book by Austrian School economist and classical liberal thinker Ludwig von Mises, first published in German by Gustav Fischer Verlag in Jena in 1922 under the title Die Gemeinwirtschaft: Untersuchungen über den Sozialismus.

Amongst other things, the book expanded Mises's views on the impossibility of economic calculation under socialism, which he had first developed in his influential 1920 article Economic Calculation in the Socialism Commonwealth. Murray Rothbard argued that Socialism was amongst the four most significant works of Mises's career, alongside The Theory of Money and Credit (1912), Human Action (1949), and Theory and History (1957).

== Translations ==
The book was first translated into English from the second reworked German edition (Jena: Gustav Fischer Verlag, 1932) by J. Kahane and published by Jonathan Cape in London in 1936. In 1951 the translation was reworked with the assistance of the author and published by Yale University Press in New Haven with the addition of an epilogue by Mises, originally published in 1947 as Planned Chaos by the Foundation for Economic Education (Irvington, NY).

== Publication history ==
=== In German ===
- Die Gemeinwirtschaft: Untersuchungen über den Sozialismus, Jena: Gustav Fischer Verlag, 1922.
- Die Gemeinwirtschaft: Untersuchungen über den Sozialismus, Jena: Gustav Fischer Verlag, 1932.
- Die Gemeinwirtschaft: Untersuchungen über den Sozialismus, Auburn, AL: Ludwig von Mises Institute, 2007. (reprint of 2nd German edition)

=== In Swedish ===
- Kapitalism och socialism i de liberala idéernas belysning. Stockholm: Norstedt, 1930. OCLC 185635826

=== In English ===
- Socialism: An Economic and Sociological Analysis. London: Jonathan Cape, 1936 OCLC 72357479
- Socialism: An Economic and Sociological Analysis. New Haven: Yale University Press, 1951.
- Socialism: An Economic and Sociological Analysis. London: Jonathan Cape, 1969
- Socialism: An Economic and Sociological Analysis. Indianapolis, IN: Liberty Fund, 1981. ISBN 0-913966-63-0.
- Socialism: An Economic and Sociological Analysis. Auburn, AL: Ludwig von Mises Institute, 200x. ISBN 0-913966-62-2.

=== In Czech ===
- Socialismus: ekonomická a sociologická analýza. Prague: Liberální institut, 2019, ISBN 978-80-86389-65-3

=== In Portuguese ===
- Socialismo: Uma Análise Econômica e Sociológica. Rio de Janeiro: Editora Konkin, 2022.

=== In Italian ===
- Socialismo: analisi economica e sociologica. Milano: Rusconi, 1990. ISBN 9788818920024 OCLC 473948102

=== In Russian ===
- Sot︠s︡ializm: ėkonomicheskiĭ i sot︠s︡iologicheskiĭ analiz. Moskva: Obshchestvo "Catallaxy", 1994, 1999. ISBN 9785863660226 OCLC 51894803

=== In Turkish ===
- Sosyalizm: İktisadi ve sosyolojik bir tahlil. Ankara: Liberte Yayınları, 2007. ISBN 9789756201190 OCLC 318030957

=== In Chinese ===
- 社会主义 : 经济与社会学的分析 / She hui zhu yi : Jing ji yu she hui xue de fen xi. 中国社会科学出版社, Beijing : Zhongguo she hui ke xue chu ban she, 2008. ISBN 9787500469261 OCLC 277257980

== Reviews ==
- Van Sickle, John V (1923). "Review of Ludwig von Mises, Die Gemeinwirtschaft, Untersuchungen über den Sozialismus". The American Economic Review. 13 (3): 533–536. JSTOR 1804583.
- Schwiedland, E (1923). "Review of Ludwig von Mises, Die Gemeinwirtschaft. Untersuchungen über den Sozialismus". The Economic Journal. 33 (131): 406–408. doi:10.2307/2223056. hdl:2027/njp.32101068785573. JSTOR 2223056.
- Stamp, J. C. (1937). "Review of Ludwig von Mises, Socialism – An Economic and Sociological Analysis". Economica. New Series. 4 (14): 223–225. doi:10.2307/2548660. JSTOR 2548660.
- Knight, Frank H. (1938). "Review of Ludwig von Mises, Socialism: An Economic and Sociological Analysis". The Journal of Political Economy. 46 (2): 267–269. doi:10.1086/255208. JSTOR 1827341.
- Heimann, Eduard (1938). "Review of Ludwig von Mises, Socialism: An Economic and Sociological Analysis". Annals of the American Academy of Political and Social Science. 195: 233–235. doi:10.1177/000271623819500163. JSTOR 1021166. S2CID 145546591.
- Hayes, H. Gordon (1937). "Review of J. Casey, The Crisis in the Communist Party and L. von Mises, Socialism: An Economic and Sociological Analysis". The American Economic Review. 27 (3): 624–625. JSTOR 1802093.
