= Theory and History =

1957 book by Ludwig von Mises

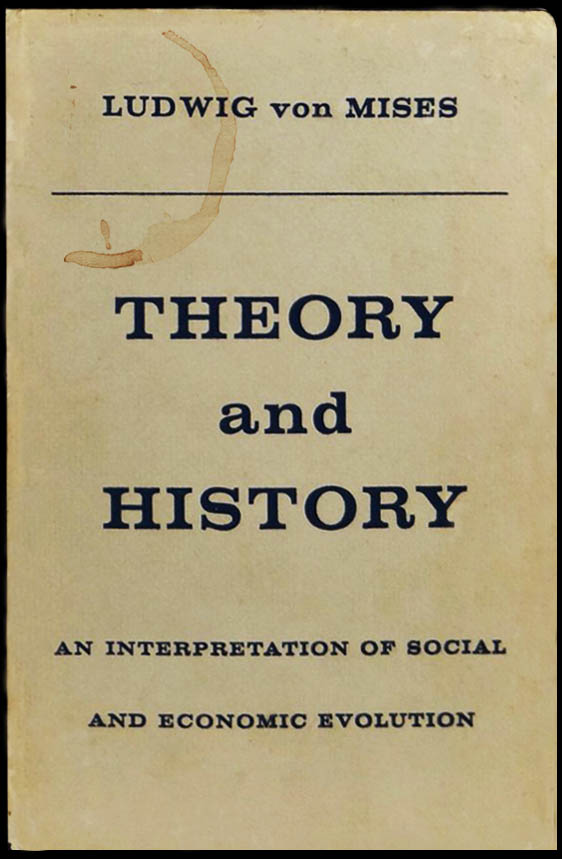
- First edition cover
- Author: Ludwig von Mises; Preface by Murray N. Rothbard
- Language: English
- Subjects: Philosophy, methodology, history, economics
- Publisher: Yale University Press, Ludwig von Mises Institute
- Publication date: 1957
- Publication place: United States
- Media type: Print (hardback & paperback)
- Pages: 384
- ISBN: 978-0865975699
- OCLC: 167149

Theory and History: An Interpretation of Social and Economic Evolution is a treatise by Austrian school economist and philosopher Ludwig von Mises. It can be thought of as a continuation in the development of the Misesian system of social science. It provides further epistemological support for his earlier works, especially Human Action. Mises elaborates on methodological dualism, develops the concept of thymology – a historical branch of the sciences of human action – and presents his critique of Marxist materialism.

Mises puts forward a theory of knowledge and value. He later explores and critically analyzes paradigms of thought like determinism, materialism, dialectic materialism, historicism, scientism, positivism, behaviorism and psychology. He argues that these schools of thought – some politically motivated, others blinded by dogmatism – have committed epistemological and methodological blunders and are not conducive to a scientific understanding of human behavior.

Economist Murray Rothbard considered Theory and History to be amongst the most significant works of Mises's career, alongside The Theory of Money and Credit (1912), Socialism (1922), and Human Action (1949), although he argued that Theory and History had been the most overlooked of these four major works.

== Synopsis ==
The book has four parts.

Introduction and Part One – Value

The first part sets the overall theme of the book with Mises introducing the concept of methodological dualism. He then expounds a theory of value that is central throughout. Regarding his view on science – as systematic body of knowledge, of both natural and social phenomena – as a means to successful action in the world, Mises argues that in order to properly understand human behavior we must attribute – as a methodological resort – volition and purpose to human behaviour. Mises considers this the epistemological and methodological basis of the sciences of human action. The branch that deals with the logical implications of action as such is called praxeology.

Part Two – Determinism and Materialism

In the second part, Mises weighs in on the free will vs. determinism controversy and comments that the long historical debates did little to settle the problems at hand. He argues that while the natural sciences, in discovering scientific laws, must presuppose a strict regularity in the occurrence of causes and effects, i.e. determinism, such a presupposition cannot be held in the case of human action. He argues further that the social sciences must take thoughts, ideas, and judgments of value as ultimately given in the analysis of human action. Our ignorance of the origins and causes of these phenomena, Mises argues, forces us – at least for the time being – to adopt a dualistic approach. He contends that attempts to find the origins and causes of these phenomena are vain, as is the task of all varieties of materialism. Mises then turns his attention to the doctrine of materialism, more specifically, that of Marxist dialectical materialism.

Part Three – Epistemological Problems of History

The third part deals with the logical and epistemological problems of historical analysis. Mises explains the individualistic character of historical human events. He argues that the historian must ultimately face – when tracing back the causal factors behind past human action – a point at which no further reduction is possible, i.e. the ideas and actions of individuals. This, he claims, is the "ultimate given of history". In spite of the individuality of historical events, Mises still insists there are general laws of human behaviour but that they are praxeological laws, i.e. a priori, not historical laws, i.e. a posteriori. However, historicism, according to Mises, claimed there were no general laws – especially economic laws – of human behavior. Mises then enters into a critique of historicism.

Mises also addresses the challenges of scientism in the context of social science, namely the application of positivism and behaviorism in the realm of human action. However, more noteworthy is Mises's presentation of thymology, a historical branch of the sciences of human action. Mises argues that thymology is what everybody resorts to when trying to understand and anticipate the historical and future actions of their fellow men, and is particularly useful to the historian. He then expounds the scope of thymology and its relation to praxeology.

Part Four – The Course of History

In the final part of his treatise, Mises dissects and critiques various speculations and interpretations of history, including a common interpretation of modern Western civilization. He also comments on his observation regarding society's move away from classical liberalism, freedom, and capitalism towards socialism and totalitarianism. Moreover, Mises notes the rising ideology of wealth and income equality and speculates on its origins. He argues that rising anti-capitalistic ideology is fostering a present trend toward the impoverishment of society. He criticizes the notion of society's inevitable "trend toward progress", and argues that the evolution of society and civilization is predicated – not on an automatic and inevitable path – but on the underlying ideology which can, at any time, change. To this point, Mises closes with some remarks on the uncertainty of the future and the neglect of ideological factors that can give rise to civilization but also stamp it out.

== See also ==
- Praxeology, the study of human action
- Human Action
- Ludwig von Mises Institute
