= The Theory of Money and Credit =

1912 book by Ludwig von Mises

- First German edition
- Author: Ludwig von Mises
- Original title: Theorie des Geldes und der Umlaufsmittel
- Language: German
- Subject: Economics
- Genre: Non-fiction
- Publication date: 1912
- Publication place: Germany

The Theory of Money and Credit is a 1912 economics book written by Ludwig von Mises, originally published in German as Theorie des Geldes und der Umlaufsmittel. It features the earliest statement of Mises's business cycle theory. The book also includes the first exposition of Mises's regression theorem, which aimed to explain the purchasing power of money using the subjective marginal utility theory of value, an accomplishment which has been argued to have reunited the microeconomic and macroeconomic spheres. The book also details Mises's views on the origins of money, on the gold standard, on the forms and functions of money, and on the role of the State and of the banking system with regard to money.

The Theory of Money and Credit is one of the foundational works of the Misesian branch of the Austrian School of economic thought. Murray Rothbard considered The Theory of Money and Credit to be one of the four major works of Mises's career, alongside Socialism (1922), Human Action (1949), and Theory and History (1957).

== Applications ==
Along with Carl Menger's Principles of Economics, and Eugen von Böhm-Bawerk's Capital and Interest, the book is one of the foundational works of the Austrian School.

== Publication history ==
- 1912: Vienna: Theorie des Geldes und der Umlaufsmittel.
- 1924: 2nd edition in German.
- 1934: London: Jonathan Cape Ltd. First translation (by Harold E. Batson) into English. The German word Umlaufsmittel literally translates as "means of circulation" and was translated into the text of the English version as "fiduciary media". However, the publisher thought the unusual terminology would irritate readers and substituted "money and credit" in the title, thereby losing the specific distinction Mises had made in selecting his original term.
- 1953: New Haven, Conn.: Yale University Press. Part Four was added by Mises to this English language edition
- 1971: Irvington-on-Hudson, N.Y.: Foundation for Economic Education.
- 1978: Irvington-on-Hudson, N.Y.: Foundation for Economic Education.
- 1981: Indianapolis,. Ind. Liberty Fund. ISBN 0-913966-70-3. 541 pages. Hardcover. (Softcover ISBN 0-913966-71-1).
- 2009: Auburn, Al. Ludwig von Mises Institute. Hardcover

== Criticism ==
According to Michael Hendricks, "the regression theorem does a good job of explaining the creation of money, however it does not necessarily apply to all forms of money."
