= Regression theorem =

Economic price theory

The Regression Theorem, first proposed by Ludwig von Mises in his 1912 book The Theory of Money and Credit, states that the value of money can be traced back ("regressed") to its "direct-use" value as a commodity. The theorem claims that at a point in time there was a good with exchange value based on the value of it as a commodity (i.e. silver, gold, etc.), which led to the good's capacity in given circumstances to procure a specific quantity of other goods as an equivalent in exchange and is derived from the human process of valuing individual goods not granted from nature, based on emotion which was then gradually adopted as money.

There has been a debate about Bitcoin's adherence to the Regression Theorem, or lack thereof. Another viewpoint states that Mises's bold assertion regarding the impossibility of a commodity to get off the ground without adhering to the Regression Theorem logically violates Mises's own subjective theory of value.
