= Methodological dualism =

Epistemological position in praxeology

In praxeology, methodological dualism is an epistemological position which states that it is necessary ─ based on our current state of knowledge and understanding ─ to use a different method in analysing the actions of human beings than the methods of the natural sciences (such as physics, chemistry, physiology, etc.).

This position is based on the presupposition that humans differ radically from other objects in the external world. Namely, humans purposefully aim at chosen ends and employ chosen means to attain them (i.e. humans act), whereas other objects in nature ─ such as, for example, sticks, stones, and atoms ─ do not.

Methodological dualism is not a metaphysical or ontological doctrine, and refrains from making such judgments.

== Overview ==
Ludwig von Mises' insistence on methodological dualism was a reaction against “the ‘methodological monism’ preached by behaviorists and positivists who [saw] no basic reason to approach human behavior and social phenomena differently from the way natural scientists approach molecular behavior and physical phenomena.”

Mises states that the sciences of human action deal with ends and means, with volition, with meaning and understanding, with “thoughts, ideas, and judgments of value”. Action is the purposive use of chosen means for the attainment of chosen ends, and ideas, beliefs, and judgments of value (called mental phenomena) determine the choice of both means and ends. Thus, these mental phenomena occupy a central position in the sciences of human action for, as Mises argues, “acts of choosing are determined by thoughts and ideas.”

In arguing for methodological dualism, Mises states because the natural sciences have not yet determined “how definite external events […] produce within the human mind definite ideas, value judgments, and volitions”, this ignorance splits our knowledge into two distinct fields, the “realm of external events” on the one hand, and the “realm of human thought and action” on the other.

Thus Mises’ conception of the sciences of human action ─ i.e. praxeology and thymology ─ is based on this methodological dualism. Mises argues that because we are ourselves thinking and acting beings we can reflect, through introspection, on the meaning of action, of intention and volition, of ends and means, and on our ideas, beliefs, and judgments of value. This kind of reflective knowledge, Mises insists, is knowledge from within us, “is our own because we are men“, whereas we are not stones or atoms and so we cannot reflect on what it means to be these things.

== See also ==
- Behavioral economics
- Cognitive science
- Hard and soft science
- Methodological individualism
