= Industrial Arts Curriculum Project =

Industrial Arts Curriculum Project (IACP) was established by Donald G. Lux and Willis Ray, the IACP project coordinators, to establish an industrial arts curriculum concerned with the instructional representation of the structure of knowledge. They placed their work within the classification of praxiological knowledge, asserting that their quest was nothing less than to identify the knowledge base that underlies all practical and vocational arts subject areas.

This joint project between Ohio State University and the University of Illinois was initiated in June, 1965.

== Course Content ==
The IACP was designed for 7th and 8th grade junior high grade levels (before the middle school transition), and had two year-long courses, "The World of Construction" and "The World of Manufacturing" (McKnight and McKnight Publishers, 1970). The concept was based on the idea that there is virtually nothing that people use on a daily basis that is not either constructed or manufactured, and that children should be taught the basis of those technologies at an early age to prevent "technological illiteracy."

=== The World of Construction ===
The World of Construction, commonly the 7th grade curriculum, taught students about how residential and commercial buildings are built. Students got a taste of woodworking, concrete, electrical and other construction trades. The final big project was to build a cross-section of a house in the traditional wood shop in the school.

=== The World of Manufacturing ===
In 8th grade, "The World of Manufacturing" was taught in the traditional metal shop of the school. Students learned about metal working crafts and trades, and as a culminating activity, set up an assembly line to create a number of items. (One of the items was a screwdriver, and whenever the students took them home, most of the screws in the school had been removed by the end of the day, causing maintenance headaches for caretakers.)

Full text of the IACP teacher guides are here:

Source: personal experience of the author at The Ohio State University
