= Ronald Hamowy =

Canadian historian (1937–2012)

Ronald Hamowy (/həˈmaʊi/; April 17, 1937 – September 8, 2012) was a Canadian academic, known primarily for his contributions to political and social academic fields. At the time of his death, he was professor emeritus of intellectual history at the University of Alberta in Edmonton, Canada. Hamowy was closely associated with the political ideology of libertarianism and his writings and scholarship place particular emphasis on individual liberty and the limits of state action in a free society. He is associated with a number of prominent American libertarian organizations.

== Biography ==
Hamowy was born in Shanghai, in the Republic of China. His family was Jewish; his father was from Syria and his mother was from Egypt. He was raised in New York City. He did his undergraduate studies in economics and history at Cornell University and City College of New York. In 1960 he was admitted to the doctoral program at the Committee on Social Thought, University of Chicago, and did his doctorate under the supervision of professor Friedrich Hayek. He did postgraduate work at Balliol College, Oxford, where he studied under Sir Isaiah Berlin and did further postgraduate work at the University of Paris.

He returned to the United States in 1968 to become an instructor and later assistant director of the History of Western Civilization Program at Stanford University. In 1969, he accepted a position as assistant professor in the History Department at the University of Alberta in Edmonton, Western Canada's largest university. He taught there until 1975, when he took a position in the Department of Political Science at Simon Fraser University, Burnaby, British Columbia; after two years at Simon Fraser, he returned to the University of Alberta where he remained until he retired from active teaching in 1998. He lived near Washington, DC.

== Academic life ==
Hamowy adopted a multidisciplinary approach to teaching and scholarship. His seminar discussions moved freely across the breadth of the humanities and social sciences, including history, philosophy, law, political theory, social theory, pure economic theory, literature, medicine, and psychiatry.

Although he shared the multidisciplinary approach with Rothbard, ten years his senior, on that point, one might too quickly overemphasize Rothbard's influence or Hamowy's time spent that was doing postgraduate work in Europe. Hamowy is best understood as the product of a unique scholarly era in America that was heavily influenced by thinkers immersed in the continental style, many of whom arrived, directly or indirectly, from Europe to the United States from the 1930s to the 1950s.

The best of the scholars gravitated to three American universities: the New School for Social Research in New York City; the University of Notre Dame in South Bend, Indiana; and most importantly, a cluster of these scholars formed at the Committee on Social Thought at the University of Chicago, where Hamowy had done his doctoral work in the 1960s.

The continental émigrés who most directly influenced his intellectual development were Hans Kohn, Ludwig von Mises, and Hayek. That influence predated Hamowy's arrival in Chicago and began in New York City while he was an undergraduate.

He admired his City College intellectual history professor Kohn, who had arrived in America in the 1930s and later taught at City College for many years, beginning in the late 1940s. Indeed, it was Kohn who first interested him in intellectual history after he returned to New York City from Ithaca, New York, in 1956. At about the same time, he also began to attend open seminars and lectures offered by the controversial libertarian Austrian economist Von Mises, who had also arrived in America in the 1940s.

Mises greatly influenced a generation of American thinkers in addition to Hamowy including Ralph Raico, Leonard Liggio, George Reisman, Israel Kirzner, and Rothbard. Hamowy first met Hayek when Hamowy arrived to Chicago in the fall of 1960 to do doctoral work under Hayek's supervision.

At the time, Hayek had been at the University of Chicago for ten years and remained there for another two years before he returned to Europe. Hayek had a substantial impact on the Committee on Social Thought and Hamowy's intellectual development as a free market scholar.

Despite the breadth of Hamowy's political and social thought, there were streams of particular emphasis that were discernible to his students at Alberta and are emphasized in his scholarship.

One of the areas of emphasis and interest in his scholarship is the theory of "spontaneous order." That refers to the notion that important and complex social arrangements can arise through the spontaneous actions of countless individuals rather than from deliberate choice or central planning. Hamowy is considered an expert on the theory of spontaneous order, unafraid to criticize even his mentor Hayek.

== Libertarianism ==
Hamowy's first brush with libertarianism was through George Reisman who was an early classmate. By the mid-1950s Hamowy was associated with Ralph Raico and Murray Rothbard.

The group of younger libertarians that formed around Rothbard in the 1950s began to call themselves the Circle Bastiat, so named after the French classical liberal Frédéric Bastiat. The group's core included Hamowy, Rothbard, Raico, Reisman, Leonard Liggio, and Robert Hessen. Regular meetings and all night discussions at Rothbard's Manhattan apartment were routine. The close association and friendship between Hamowy and Rothbard continued unabated until Rothbard's death in January 1995, at the age of 68.

After he arrived at the University of Chicago in the fall of 1960, one year after Raico, who had departed New York for Chicago the previous year, Hamowy was appointed book review editor of the seminal libertarian student publication, the New Individualist Review soon after he joined Raico as co‑Editor in Chief. The Review, though only a student publication, received important scholarly contributions from numerous famous scholars including future Nobel Prize winners Hayek, Milton Friedman, George Stigler, and Ronald Coase. In addition to his editing responsibilities, Hamowy engaged in a friendly debate in print with his doctoral supervisor Hayek, and a perhaps less friendly though entertaining rapportage with the conservative columnist William F. Buckley Jr.

He continued to make contributions to libertarian think tanks and journals throughout his career, including The Independent Institute, Institute for Humane Studies, The Cato Institute, Rampart College, the Journal of Libertarian Studies, and the Cato Journal.

During his years in Canada, he contributed to furthering the cause of the free society, particularly in Western Canada. He was published by the Fraser Institute and contributed to various student clubs and student seminars dedicated to the advancement of individual liberty and political freedom.

== Publications ==
- Canadian Medicine: A Study in Restricted Entry. Vancouver, B.C., Canada: Fraser Institute. 1984. ISBN 978-0889750623. OCLC 11731646
- Dealing with Drugs: Consequences of Government Control. Lexington, MA: Lexington Books. 1988. ISBN 978-0669156782. OCLC 15132227.
- The Political Sociology of Freedom: Adam Ferguson and F.A. Hayek. Cheltenham, UK Edward Elgar. 2005. ISBN 978-1845421083. OCLC 59712260.
- Governance and Public Health in America: the Transition from Private Service to Public Agencies. New Brunswick, NJ: Transaction. 2006. ISBN 978-0765803436. OCLC 64625024.
- Government and Public Health in America. Northampton, MA: Edward Elgar. 2007. ISBN 978-1845429119. OCLC 74968745.
- Hamowy, Ronald, ed. (2008). The Encyclopedia of Libertarianism. Thousand Oaks, CA: Sage; Cato Institute. doi:10.4135/9781412965811. ISBN 978-1412965804. LCCN 2008009151. OCLC 750831024 – via Internet Archive.
- Hayek, F.A. (2011). Hamowy, Ronald (ed.). The Collected Works of F.A. Hayek: The Constitution of Liberty. Vol. XVII. Chicago: The University of Chicago Press.
