= Human Action =

Book by Ludwig von Mises (1949)

Human Action: A Treatise on Economics
- First edition
- Author: Ludwig von Mises
- Language: English
- Subject: Political economy
- Publisher: Yale University Press (1st and 2nd Edition), Regnery (3rd Edition), Liberty Fund (4th Edition), Ludwig von Mises Institute (Scholar's Edition)
- Publication date: 1949, 1963, 1966, 1998, 2010
- Publication place: United States
- Media type: Print (hardback and paperback)
- Pages: 881
- ISBN: 978-0865976313
- OCLC: 730271204

Human Action: A Treatise on Economics is a work by the Austrian economist and philosopher Ludwig von Mises. Widely considered Mises' magnum opus, it presents the case for laissez-faire capitalism based on praxeology, his method to understand the structure of human decision-making. Mises rejected positivism within economics, and defended an a priori foundation for praxeology, as well as methodological individualism and laws of self-evident certainty. Mises argues that the free-market economy not only outdistances any government-planned system, but ultimately serves as the foundation of civilization itself.

Nationalökonomie: Theorie des Handelns und Wirtschaftens is the 1940 German-language predecessor to Human Action.

Mises argues that market-generated money prices are essential to determine the most highly valued uses for resources to satisfy consumer demands. He attempts to demonstrate the inconsistencies of piecemeal political intervention in the market economy and the pernicious effects of political control and manipulation of the monetary system. In Mises's view, government interventions that distort market prices always result in misdirections of resources, including labor, and malinvestments of capital, leading to inflationary upswings followed by inevitable economic downturns. Mises believed that the market economy was the only system that provided freedom and personal choice to all members of society while generating the means for coordinating the actions of billions of people in the most economically rational manner, and that monetary manipulation by central banks was one of the most disruptive distortions to the process of economic calculation.

== Summary ==
In his Introduction, Mises argues that economics emerged as a science when a regularity in the sequence and interdependence of market phenomena was discovered. He notes the challenges faced by economics as a new science, particularly in being accepted as a legitimate branch of knowledge, and discusses various schools of thought that rejected the achievements of economic thought. Mises refutes common criticisms against economics, stating that the ideas of classical economists have improved the general standard of living by promoting liberal policies and technological improvement. He also argues that economic problems cannot be isolated as they are just a segment of a general science of human action.

=== Part One: Human Action ===
Chapter 1, "Acting Man", explains the concept of human action, which is defined as"purposeful behavior" and distinguished from reflexive behavior in that an observer imputes a goal to the actor. Praxeology is the science of action as such, which studies the results deduced from the fact that people have goals and adopt means to achieve them. For an action to occur, the actor must be in a state of unease, imagine a more satisfactory state, and believe that purposeful behavior can reduce the uneasiness. The text addresses the concept of happiness and instinct, where happiness is defined entirely by the subjective goals of the individual actor, and humans can suppress their biological urges. The study of human action begins with the ultimate given of human action itself, and all studies of human actions must rely on methodological dualism. Praxeology is subjective, as it takes actors' subjective ends as they exist in the minds of each person, but by refraining from passing judgment on these ends, it remains objective. Causality is necessary for action, and the Heisenberg uncertainty principle does not alter this. Finally, the text introduces the concept of the alter ego, where all events must fall in the realm of teleology or causality.

Chapter 2, "The Epistemological Problems of the Sciences of Human Action", is about the sciences of human action, praxeology, and history. "History is the collection and systematic arrangement of all the data of experience concerning human action." Praxeology, on the other hand, starts from the fact of human action and uses logical deduction to arrive at a priori truths that are valid for all action, both in the past and future. The principles of causality and teleology are also necessary prerequisites for the mind to make sense of the world. The text emphasizes that praxeology concerns the actions of individuals and deals with individual actions, not vague action in general. The historian can rely on other disciplines but must use his prior value judgments and theories to determine what is relevant and then present the facts accordingly. The limitations on praxeological concepts are also discussed.

Chapter 3, "Economics and the Revolt Against Reason", discusses the topic of polylogism, which is the belief that different groups of people, such as different races or social classes, have fundamentally different ways of thinking and reasoning. Mises argues that this idea is not supported by evidence and is instead used as a way to discredit opponents' arguments without actually addressing them. He also emphasizes the importance of reason as the primary tool for acting humans and warns against rejecting it in favor of instinct, which would be detrimental to civilization.

Chapter 4, "A First Analysis of the Category of Action", discusses the concept of ends and means, where the end is the result sought by an actor and the means are used to attain the end. Praxeology analyzes an actor's goals and beliefs to explain market phenomena. The distinction between free goods and economic goods is unhelpful, and goods are classified as consumers' goods or producers' goods based on their direct or indirect satisfaction of human wants. Value resides in the minds of actors who rank objects according to their desirability. Economics can be built on the subjective scale of values possessed by actual individuals. All actions are voluntary exchanges where the cost of an action is the value of the price paid and the forgone satisfaction. Profit is a subjective category that is immeasurable, and actors are fallible.

Chapter 5, "Time", discusses the temporal character of praxeology, the study of human action. While praxeology is a logical system, it is intimately related to time, as action is what makes man aware of the flux of time. The present is not defined as a unit of duration but rather as the presence of a ripe opportunity to take potential action. Time is scarce, and must be economized even in a hypothetical paradise where all material needs are met. Actions must occur in succession through time, and it is the action itself that is the brute fact, not an underlying value scale. It is pointless to judge the actions of individuals with reference to their value scales.

Chapter 6, "Uncertainty", discusses uncertainty and probability in human action. Action implies uncertainty because if the future were known, there would be no impetus to act. The problem of probable inference, reaching a decision in the face of incomplete knowledge, is a broad one that cuts across many disciplines. There are two fields of probability, class and case probability, with the former applicable to natural sciences and the latter applicable to social sciences. In class probability, we know everything about the entire class of events or phenomena, but we know nothing particular about the individuals making up the class. Case probability is applicable when we know some factors that will affect a particular event, but we are ignorant of other factors that will also influence the outcome. Betting is when a man risks money on an outcome where he knows some of the factors involved, while gambling is when he risks money on an outcome where he knows only the frequencies of the various elements of the class. Praxeology can make certain qualitative predictions about the future, but quantitative forecasts are not certain.

Chapter 7, "Action Within the World", covers several topics related to economics and human action, including the law of marginal utility, the law of returns, human labor as a means, and production. The law of marginal utility refers to the fact that the utility of successive units of a given good decreases, as the actor will apply the additional units to less and less urgent ends. Marginal utility is always defined according to the subjective framework of the actor in question. The law of returns describes the quantitative causal relations of the world, specifically in relation to producer goods. A given unit of a producer good must always act in combination with at least one other producer good to yield a definite quantity of a consumer good. At some finite point, an "optimum" level will be reached, and the quantity of output per unit of input will be maximized. Human labor as a means carries disutility, meaning that actors will not devote the physiological-maximum amount of labor to achieve attainable ends. The disutility of labor increases as the supply of leisure shrinks. Labor is the ultimate "nonspecific" factor and is required in every production process. Production is not creative but rather combines various inputs to produce a good or service. The creative genius is an exception to this, as they do not labor for immediate or mediate gratification.

=== Part Two: Action Within the Framework of Society ===
Chapter 8, "Human Society", discusses various aspects of human cooperation, including the benefits of the division of labor, the superiority of social cooperation, the critiques of the metaphysical view of society, and the Ricardian Law of Association. The text also talks about the effects of the division of labor on society, the emergence of man as a social being, and the Great Society. Finally, the text addresses the instinct of aggression and destruction and how it has been overcome by social cooperation.

Chapter 9, "The Role of Ideas", discusses several topics related to human action and ideology. Firstly, human action is distinguished by reasoning, and while reasoning may be faulty, it is always the individual who thinks, and tradition and language allow present actors to incorporate their ancestors' reasoning into their own thinking. Secondly, a worldview serves as both an interpretation of all things and a guide to action, while ideology is more restricted to human interaction over earthly concerns. Despite their incompatibility on the surface, various ideologies champion the same things for their followers, and their disagreements are not over abstract principles. Thirdly, might is the power to direct the actions of others, and society is a product of ideology. Lastly, the notions of progress and retrogression only make sense in the context of an actor's plan, and the fatal flaw of 18th- and 19th-century rationalists and (classical) liberals was their faith in the decency and wisdom of the common man.

Chapter 10, "Exchange Within Society", discusses the concepts of autistic exchange, which concerns only one actor, and interpersonal exchange, which involves cooperation between two or more individuals. People can cooperate in either a contractual or hegemonic relationship, with contractual societies being more peaceful than hegemonic ones. All action involves the use of ordinal numbers to rank possible outcomes, but the use of cardinal numbers requires special conditions and developed in the context of a contractual society. The ability to apply arithmetic to various fields is crucial for modern civilization, and economics itself can be described as a theory of human action that relies on calculation.

=== Part Three: Economic Calculation ===
Chapter 11, "Valuation Without Calculation", discusses the gradation of means and how actors value means based on the ends they can achieve. Mises explains that actors must choose between various outcomes that all consist of countable supplies of different goods, and that the fundamental act of choice always involves a purely ordinal value judgment. Mises also discusses the imaginary construction of the barter economy and the role of money. Historically, economists believed that money was neutral and served only to facilitate "real" transactions, and that items exchanged in a market were of equal value. However, the modern subjective theory of value starts with the realization that people trade goods precisely because they value them differently. Mises then delves into the problem of economic calculation, explaining that technology alone cannot solve the problem because each means of production is more or less suitable for a wide range of ends, and thus each means is substitutable for others but to varying degrees, depending on the task. Only money prices can solve the problem of economic calculation. Finally, Mises discusses the relationship between economic calculation and the market, explaining that money prices established in a market are not measurements of value, but rather historical facts that provide a guide to future action. Without them, all of the subsidiary concepts in accounting would be metaphorical.

Chapter 12, "The Sphere of Economic Calculation", discusses the nature of economic calculation and its limitations. Economic calculation is used to make decisions based on monetary values, but it cannot account for things that do not exchange for money. Prices are in constant flux and cannot be stabilized. Attempts to stabilize the purchasing power of money suffer from difficulties such as the fact that prices consist of money and there is no immutable unit of value. The popularity of the idea of stabilization comes from the desire for a secure arena outside the uncertainty of the market. Historically, moneys that originated on the market, such as gold and silver, were adequate for economic calculation, but government inflations changed this.

Chapter 13, "Monetary Calculation as a Tool of Action", discusses monetary calculation as a guiding principle of action in societies with a division of labor. Monetary calculation evaluates potential actions based on expected costs and revenues and past actions with the accounting of profit and loss. However, monetary calculation requires private property in the means of production and a universally accepted medium of exchange (i.e., money) to function. Capitalism is inextricably linked to monetary calculation, as the notion of capital depends on summing the market prices of the resources available for a project. Praxeology and economics were developed based on historical evolution of economic calculation, as only with money prices and related concepts could patterns in commercial activity be noticed.

=== Part Four: Catallactics or Economics of the Market Society ===
Chapter 14, "The Scope and Method of Catallactics", focuses on the science of human action or praxeology, which studies goal-seeking, rational behavior. The chapter describes the delimitation of catallactic problems, which involve analyzing the formation of money prices for all goods and services exchanged on a market. The chapter also explains the use of imaginary constructions as the method of praxeology and the analysis of the pure market economy. Other topics covered in the chapter include the autistic economy, the state of rest, and the evenly rotating economy. Finally, the chapter also discusses the stationary economy and its relationship with profit and interest.

Chapter 15, "The Market", focuses on the characteristics of the market economy, capital, capitalism, the sovereignty of consumers, competition, freedom, and inequality of wealth and income. In the market economy, individuals specialize in their occupations, and the means of production are privately owned. Economic calculation is based on the notions of capital and income, and capital goods refer to physical objects that can be used to augment future production. History shows that private property goes hand in hand with civilization, and although the market economy has never existed in a pure form, it has grown in Western civilizations since the Middle Ages. Even though entrepreneurs appear to be in charge, consumers are sovereign, and their purchasing decisions determine which businesses expand and which contract. Competition entrusts control of scarce resources to those who are most likely to satisfy the wants of consumers, and the true restrictions on competition come from government, not the market. Freedom and liberty are the most precious goods to many thinkers in the Western tradition, and people are not born equal.

Chapter 16, "Prices", covers the pricing process, valuation and appraisement, the prices of goods of higher orders, cost accounting, and logical catallactics versus mathematical catallactics. The pricing process in an organized market is determined by the subjective valuations of consumers and entrepreneurs, who appraise goods to make buying decisions that cause price formation. Appraisement is an objective assessment of an item's market value, which may differ from a person's subjective valuation. Entrepreneurs evaluate factors of production based on their appraisal of the products that these factors can create, which determines the prices of second- and higher-order goods. Cost accounting is the process of evaluating the costs of production to determine how to create products and earn revenue that will cover the entrepreneur's explicit costs. Mises argues that mathematical models of pricing are flawed because they ignore the market process, which is necessary for understanding the formation of real-world prices.

Then, several topics related to monopoly are discussed. A monopolist violates consumer sovereignty when they restrict output below the competitive level. Good will, or a producer's reputation, gives them an advantage over competitors who lack it, and government certification is not an effective solution to asymmetric information. Monopolistic buyers can restrict demand, but they cannot earn a specific gain like monopolistic sellers can. Monopoly prices generally impair consumer happiness, except when a product would not be produced without monopoly prices for an essential input. Price discrimination can occur on the part of both sellers and buyers, but it can only happen under certain conditions and may not persist on a free market. Government privileges, not free markets, establish most cartels and monopolies.

Finally, there are several topics discussed regarding the connexity of prices. The prices of goods are related because they compete for the money of buyers, and labor is required for every good, making them interrelated on both the consumption and production side. The market process does not engage in separate activities of price and income determination, as the exchange ratios in specific transactions determine both. The market process directs the factors of production into those lines that best satisfy the desires of the consumers. It is nonsense to speak of non-market prices because market prices take into account all relevant facts. Any attempt to alter prices would ignore these real considerations, which would ultimately make consumers poorer.

Chapter 17, "Indirect Exchange", discusses the concept of money and the errors associated with it. Indirect exchange requires a medium of exchange, where a good or commodity is used to facilitate a more ultimate exchange. When one good becomes the commonly used medium of exchange, it becomes money. The "equation of exchange" is a faulty method of analyzing money because it assumes that the level of prices and total output are meaningful concepts, leading to the flawed notion of the neutrality of money. The purchasing power of money is explained by the difference in marketability of various goods, and the demand for money depends on its exchange value. Carl Menger's theory of the spontaneous origin of money states that money emerged naturally from direct exchange, as people increased their demand for marketable goods. Finally, the price of money depends on its exchange value in the market and its industrial and monetary demand.

Changes in the purchasing power of money can arise from the money side or the real side, but typically changes in the purchasing power of money can only occur from the money side. Changes originating from the money side can only redistribute wealth and cannot make the community richer. Businessmen must decide upon a money in which to reckon for economic calculation purposes. If people expect the purchasing power of money to change, they will adjust their cash holdings accordingly and speed up the process, which may result in the abandonment of the currency causing the "crackup boom" (Katastrophenhausse). Money substitutes perform all the services of money and become a money substitute if there is a claim to a definite amount of money, payable and redeemable on demand, such that no one doubts the solvency of the debtor. If the debtor has issued more money substitutes than it can redeem with money proper, then the "unbacked" portion of the claims become fiduciary media. The limit to the issuance of fiduciary media is that if the issuance proceeds so rapidly that the public becomes suspicious, they will turn in the claims and demand redemption in actual money.

Mises discusses various topics related to money, trade, and inflation. People decide on the appropriate size of cash holdings based on subjective marginal utility, and it is possible to hold too much cash. The balance of payments is the record of the money equivalent of the incomings and outgoings of an individual or group during a specific period of time, and a trade "deficit" is not an unforeseen calamity but rather the cumulative outcome of deliberate transactions undertaken by each individual. Exchange rates between currencies are kept within narrow limits due to arbitrage opportunities. Credit transactions carried out in the same currency tend to yield the same interest rates for comparable credit risks, and secondary media of exchange are goods that are still quite marketable but not as much as the money good. In a market economy free from government expansion of the money supply, prices would generally fall over time, and the gold standard marked the hallmark of classical liberalism. International monetary cooperation is not necessary for an international gold standard to work.

Chapter 18, "Action in the Passing of Time", covers the topic of time and its role in human action. It explains how all actions are directed towards the improvement of future conditions, but people do not value fractions of time equally. The text covers different concepts of time, including maturing time, working time, period of production, and duration of serviceableness. It emphasizes that time preference is essential to action and implies that present goods are more valuable than future goods, if the only difference is their date of availability. The text also discusses capital goods, which are factors of production that have been produced, and how lengthening the period of production requires savings. The structure of production is complex, and monetary profit-and-loss calculation helps determine if capital is growing or shrinking. Mises explains the concepts of period of production, waiting time, and period of provision, emphasizing that action is always forward-looking.

According to Mises, capital refers to physical capital goods and their degree of convertibility, and even cash is not a completely free form of capital. He believes that the market economy cannot be judged based on hindsight because the limited convertibility of capital goods is what prevents the adoption of more productive arrangements. Maintaining or increasing capital, for Mises, means maintaining or increasing the productivity of future efforts at want satisfaction, which can only be accomplished through saving. Capital consumption occurs when the consumption takes such a large portion of current output that the remainder devoted to new capital goods is insufficient to replace the depreciation of the capital stock. The transactions of the stock market, according to Mises, do not alter the sum total of profits or losses, but merely the particular people on whom the profits or losses fall, which shows the pointlessness of foreign-exchange controls. He explains that entrepreneurs hold cash balances, and saving and investment are necessary for accumulating additional capital.

Chapter 19, "The Rate of Interest", explains the phenomenon of interest. Originary interest is the discount applied to future goods versus present goods, and is ultimately due to the universal phenomenon of time preference. It explains the higher market price for present goods versus future goods. Interest income is not just earned by the owners of capital goods but also by the owners of land. The rate of interest is not determined in the loan market but is determined by people's subjective time preferences. A higher interest rate does not necessarily draw forth more savings, rather, the discount people place on future goods determines both the amount of saving and the height of interest rates. The supply of capital goods bears no necessary relationship with the rate of interest. Lastly, the excess of gross revenues over total money expenditures is not just profit, but it is the implicit wages for the entrepreneur, interest on the capital invested, and true entrepreneurial profit or loss.

Chapter 20, "Interest, Credit Expansion, and the Trade Cycle", discusses the neutral rate of interest and the problems associated with it. It explains that the neutral rate of interest is the hypothetical, single rate of originary interest that would prevail in an imaginary, perfectly competitive economy. However, in the real world, there are different implicit rates of interest in various lines of production, due to people's inability to perfectly forecast the future. The chapter also discusses the credit expansion, which is responsible for the business cycle. It explains that the actual gross rate of interest quoted in a loan contract reflects not only the pure rate of originary interest, but also an entrepreneurial component and a price premium component. The chapter further explains that the market process tends to equalize the net rates of interest in various lines, bringing them all into conformity with the originary rate of interest. The crucial function of the market interest rate is to coordinate the duration of production processes. If the gross market rate of interest is distorted due to changes in the money supply, it may mislead entrepreneurs.

Then, there is a discussion on credit expansion and contraction, as well as the monetary theory of the trade cycle. In credit expansion, the government artificially increases the money supply by lowering interest rates, which leads to a boom period with malinvestments, and ultimately to a bust phase. In credit contraction, the government artificially reduces the money supply by increasing interest rates, which leads to lower prices but has no lasting ill effects. The Currency School made mistakes in only analyzing the cycle in terms of one country's banking sector and missing the issue of the deviation of the market rate of interest from the originary rate. Theories of the boom-bust cycle that rely on "real" factors still assume that there is a credit expansion necessary for a boom and bust. Finally, the depression is the necessary readjustment phase to correct the malinvestments that occurred during the boom.

Chapter 21, "Work and Wages", distinguishes between two types of labor, "introversive" labor and "extroversive" labor, and identifies four reasons why people undertake labor, which may include building strength, religious duty, and avoiding mischief. The author discusses the psychological experiences of joy and tedium associated with labor, and how these experiences do not affect the disutility of labor. The text also explores the determination of wages through competition in the labor market, where wage rates are determined by the marginal productivity of labor. Mises discusses the concept of catallactic unemployment, where workers remain unemployed due to their perception of available working opportunities.

Then, Mises discusses various topics related to wages, subsistence, and the labor market. The classical economists explained wage rates as being determined by the bare subsistence requirements of workers, but this "iron law of wages" was false, as the standard of living of the average worker continued to grow under capitalism. The Marxist and Prussian Historical Schools explained modern wage rates as directly caused by historical precedent rather than current valuations. Under capitalism, the accumulation of capital has proceeded more quickly than the increase in population, so that the marginal product of the worker has risen over time, allowing for an increase in real wage rates. The popular interpretation of the "Industrial Revolution" as being exploitative and requiring pro-labor reforms is a myth. Finally, the labor market is affected by changes in market data, and wage rates are equal to the price of the "full produce of labor."

Chapter 22, "The Nonhuman Original Factors of Production", discusses the theory of rent and land use. The classical trichotomy of land, labor, and capital is shown to be untenable, and modern economics uses a single theoretical framework to explain the prices of each productive factor. The distinction between original and produced means of production is retained, and the use of nonhuman factors of production depends on institutional factors. The quantity of available land is so large that submarginal land is not brought into cultivation at all, and some land must be withdrawn from agricultural or other "productive" uses to be used as the foundation for homes, office buildings, factories, etc. The price of a piece of land is equal to the sum of its future rents, discounted by the rate of interest. The romanticized notion of land as a noble source of livelihood is discredited, as actual peasants view land as a means for the satisfaction of wants.

Chapter 23, "The Data of the Market", discusses various topics related to economics. Praxeology deals with human action and its theorems are exact as long as the conditions are present. Economics does not assume that man is free, but rather deals with the fact of scarcity and the role of coercion in people's behavior in the marketplace. Theorems of catallactics apply to private ownership of the means of production, and division of labor. The real man and his actions are the focus of economics, not economic man or a statistically average man. The market adjusts to changes in data, but entrepreneurs must anticipate the rate of adjustment. Cases of external costs reflect loopholes in the legal system rather than flaws in private property. Legal restrictions on the market may lead to monopoly gains or differential rents.

Chapter 24, "Harmony and Conflict of interests", argues that one man's profit is not necessarily another man's loss, and that entrepreneurial profits are earned by better adjusting production to satisfy consumer desires. Mises also discusses how the limitation of offspring is necessary for maintaining higher standards of living and that private property is essential to the market economy. He emphasizes that there is a harmony of interests among all people and that conflicts only arise due to government interference in the market. Finally, he claims that war and conflicts are caused by government interference and that respecting private property is the liberal solution to these issues.

=== Part Five: Social Cooperation Without a Market ===
Chapter 25, "The Imaginary Construction of a Socialist Society", discusses the historical origins of the socialist idea, which emerged from classical liberal writers' depiction of an all-powerful and benevolent king who could achieve socially beneficial outcomes similar to those of a market economy. With the rise of modern industry, the call for equal redistribution of property became impractical, and the idea of socialization of the means of production arose, with the state handling all economic affairs. Karl Marx did not invent socialist doctrine but contributed to it with the idea of polylogism and the inevitability of socialism. The socialist creed rests upon three dogmas: society is an omnipotent and omniscient being, the coming of socialism is inevitable, and history is a continuous progress towards socialism. The crucial feature of socialism is that all productive activities are directed by one will. The praxeological critique of socialism is not over the choice of ends, but whether socialism can effectively allocate resources to achieve the most desirable outcome from the dictator's point of view.

Chapter 26, "The Impossibility of Economic Calculation Under Socialism", discusses what Mises considers the central problem of socialism. The lack of economic calculation in socialism means that planners cannot compare the benefits and costs of different uses of scarce resources, making planning impossible. The failure to conceive of this problem is attributed to the focus of mathematical economists on static-equilibrium states in their formal models, which do not require entrepreneurship and can be achieved without the use of money. The schemes proposed by socialist theorists to address the problem of economic calculation, such as valuing goods based on their inherent labor content or units of "utility," are argued to be untenable. The absence of a market test of profit and loss in socialism means that the planner cannot resort to trial and error. The recent proposals for "market socialism," which suggest that planners give instructions to plant managers to behave "as if" they were in a market economy, are also argued to be untenable. The differential equations of mathematical economics do not provide guidance for how the planner should move toward the desired end state while maintaining a satisfactory condition during the transition phase.

=== Part Six: The Hampered Market Economy ===
Chapter 27, "The Government and the Market", discusses the idea of a third economic system that is neither pure capitalism nor pure socialism. He explains that there are two patterns for the realization of socialism, the Lenin/Russian pattern where all enterprises are nationalized, and the Hindenburg/German pattern where the appearance of a market is retained but all activity is directed by the central authority. Mises argues that the purpose of government is to ensure the smooth operation of the market economy by enforcing property rights and that direct government interference with consumption choices can be analyzed by economics. He also explains that the concept of "laissez-faire" does not mean doing nothing in the face of unsatisfactory social conditions, but rather it is about allowing individuals the freedom to plan their own lives versus granting all power to the government. Finally, Mises suggests that a voluntary system based on ethical or religious ideals could be a possible social arrangement, but specific guidelines would be needed to ensure its success.

Chapter 28, "Interference by Taxation", discusses taxation and its effects on the market. Mises argues that the goal of neutral taxation, where prices are not disturbed by the system of taxation, is unachievable as every system of taxation will affect market prices to a greater or lesser extent. The chapter also explores the concept of a total tax, where the government confiscates all income or wealth and redistributes it back to its subjects, and the fiscal and nonfiscal objectives of taxation, which can sometimes be in conflict. Finally, the various methods of taxation are classified into three groups, with the third class being a vehicle for the achievement of socialism, and will be discussed in later chapters.

Chapter 29, "Restriction of Production", discusses government restrictions on the free market and their impact on production and consumption. Such restrictions inevitably make people poorer and alter the pattern of production. While it is possible that some restrictions may be justified if their benefits outweigh their costs, typically government restrictions fail to achieve their stated purpose, and are unjustified. Despite making the entire nation poorer, each restriction can bestow benefits on a subset of the population, which makes it politically difficult to remove them. Restrictions can also be used to shield domestic industries from the immediate consequences of regulations. It is possible that some restrictions may be justified, but they should be classified as quasi-consumption, not production. Measures like maximum workweeks and other "prolabor" laws are part of a quasi-consumption program and do not raise standards of living.

Chapter 30, "Interference with the Structure of Prices", discusses government interference in the market and its effects. Price controls, such as ceilings or floors, cause shortages or surpluses in the market and interfere with the equilibrium between supply and demand. They also alter the structure of production, leading to the opposite effect of what was intended. Minimum wage rates and labor union violence also affect the market, as they raise wages for some workers, but reduce wages in other sectors. Ultimately, the only way to raise wages is to increase capital per worker, which labor unions have historically opposed. Finally, the text presents a historical example of how price controls contributed to the decline of the Roman Empire.

Chapter 31, "Currency and Credit Manipulation", discusses government intervention in currency, including legal tender laws and currency manipulation. Governments historically certified the weight and fineness of coins used as money, but many abused this privilege by debasing the coins and forcing people to accept them as legitimate. The international gold standard emerged as a result of classical liberalism, but governments sometimes used legal-tender laws to relieve the plight of debtors, which led to monetary inflation. This interventionism did not provide long-term relief for debtors and often resulted in higher gross interest rates and breakdowns in the credit system. Under a metallic currency, governments could not easily manipulate currency because attempts at debasement would lead to the effects described by Gresham's law. The gold-exchange standard gave governments more flexibility in inflating the money supply by weaning the public from its holding of actual gold in cash balances. Governments hoped that currency devaluation would achieve various objectives, such as reducing real wage rates, raising commodity prices, and encouraging exports, but these goals were often unsuccessful.

Mises discusses credit expansion, which can occur even on an unhampered market. Historically, banks maintained less than 100 percent reserves in the vault because most customers wouldn't show up at the same time wishing to withdraw their funds. However, in modern times, governments have seized control of the monetary and banking system, and credit expansion is used for various ends, leading to the boom-bust cycle in modern economies. Socialists and interventionists blame recurring depressions on inherent failings of the market economy, but they don't recognize the role played by government credit expansion during the boom. The government cannot alter the physical fact of the slump through borrowing money or creating additional quantities of paper money.

Foreign exchange control and bilateral exchange agreements are also discussed. A government may decree a maximum price for units of a foreign currency, which leads to a shortage of the foreign currency, blamed on speculators and an unfavorable trade balance. The government can resort to makeshifts to ease the problem, but it cannot help the trade balance in the long run. The government can enforce the official, overvalued exchange rate, while still permitting the return of the de facto market exchange rate, by subsidizing exporters and taxing importers, but this brings the economy closer to full-blown socialism. The government may resort to barter agreements with other nations to conceal the decline in the currency's purchasing power against gold or other currencies. Nazi barter agreements with various foreign countries allowed governments to achieve their own political ends at the expense of members of their populations who were out of favor with the government.

Chapter 32, "Confiscation and Redistribution", discusses the negative consequences of confiscatory taxation, land reform, and the philosophy of confiscation on economic growth and efficiency. Mises argues that production and distribution are integrated under capitalism, and confiscation can lead to capital consumption and discourage producers from investing. It also highlights how interference with market outcomes, such as breaking up larger farms or imposing progressive income taxation, can reduce efficiency, hamper growth, and benefit a few unproductive farmers or the rich. Finally, it argues against the claim that confiscatory taxation reduces entrepreneurs' appetite for risk-taking, arguing that the harm lies in reducing incentives for capital accumulation and consumption.

Chapter 33, "Syndicalism and Corporativism", discusses syndicalism, guild socialism, and corporatism. Syndicalism can refer to revolutionary tactics to achieve socialism or a method of economic organization that aims to give workers ownership over their plants and equipment. However, the root of the syndicalist idea is the mistaken belief that entrepreneurs and capitalists are analogous to kings and aristocrats. Syndicalist policies grant privileges to a minority of workers that result in a lower standard of living for the immense majority. Guild socialism and corporatism aim to form monopolistic bodies where each branch of business has full autonomy to determine internal affairs. However, the essential flaw in this scheme is that entire branches of production cannot be "autonomous" under the division of labor. In practice, guild socialism will revert to outright socialism.

Chapter 34, "The Economics of War", discusses the relationship between war and the market economy. Mises argues that the market economy relies on peaceful cooperation, while war involves total conflict. Before the French Revolution, wars in Europe were generally limited and waged by professional soldiers, but modern states engage in total war due to interventionism and central planning. Mises contends that only liberal policies, not treaties or international organizations, can ensure lasting peace. During wartime, the government must divert resources from consumer goods to military production, and entrepreneurs are best equipped to handle this switch if they are allowed to earn profits. However, the government's attempt to maintain workers' real take-home pay during World War II led to market intervention, including rationing schemes and price controls. Mises argues that autarky (self-sufficiency) is not a viable solution to war since it produces inferior goods and higher production costs. Ultimately, Mises believes that interventionism generates economic nationalism and bellicosity, and only laissez-faire policies can lead to durable peace.

Chapter 35, "The Welfare Principle Versus the Market Principle", provides a response to three criticisms against the market economy: poverty, inequality, and insecurity. Regarding poverty, Mises argues that capitalism and the rise of industry have allowed for more people to work and support themselves, while interventionism has hindered private charitable efforts. Inequality in incomes and wealth is an inherent feature of the market economy, and the only path to rising standards of living is through the continual increase in capital per capita. Finally, capitalism does give rise to income and wealth insecurity, but this is not the fault of capitalists but of consumers who each day seek the products and services that best satisfy their wants at the lowest prices. The modern welfare theorists are superior to older schools of reformers because they acknowledge that the only metric for a social system is their ability to allow men to achieve their ends.

Chapter 36, "The Crisis of Interventionism", argues that interventionism has led to negative consequences such as world wars, depressions, famines, and civil wars, but these have been wrongly blamed on capitalism. Interventionism has now reached its end as it has exhausted its potentialities. The reserve fund, which is the wealth of the rich and the incomes of entrepreneurs, has been drained to pay for lavish benefits and spending on the working classes. The three reasons why interventionism must come to an end are that restrictive measures cannot constitute a system of production, intervention in the market fails to achieve its ends and aims at seizing the surplus from one group and giving it to another, and once the surplus is gone, interventionism must end. Even though most European countries have adopted socialism, they can still rely on the market prices generated in capitalist countries. People must choose between socialism and the market economy as there is no stable middle-of-the-road position, and if economic calculation becomes impossible due to the adoption of socialism, the result would be chaos and the disintegration of social cooperation.

=== Part Seven: The Place of Economics in Society ===
Chapter 37, "The Nondescript Character of Economics", argues that economics is different from other branches of knowledge because its theories cannot be proven or falsified by experience. It is also noted that convincing the majority of the public is necessary for the insights of economic theorists to improve civilization. The chapter concludes by criticizing the old liberals for assuming that the majority would support capitalism based on its benefits and their ability to reason correctly, without anticipating the success of anticapitalist propaganda.

Chapter 38, "The Place of Economics in Learning", explains, firstly, that the establishment of an institute for business-cycle research is not sufficient to find cures for business cycles. Clear thinking and sound economic theory are needed. Secondly, the rise of economics as a profession is due to interventionism, and many professional economists only advance the interests of a small group. Thirdly, economists can only predict the general timing of boom-bust cycles, and successful entrepreneurs need to have better forecasts than their rivals. Fourthly, although economics is a unified whole, university professors engage in compartmentalized analyses, and the fallacies of interventionism preached by professors may lead some students to support socialism. Fifthly, the conflict between different interpretations of history and economics exists in schools, but most students are too immature to choose among them, and teachers cannot present them neutrally. Lastly, modern governments suppress freedom of economic thought, but citizens have a duty to familiarize themselves with basic economic theory, as modern political controversies revolve around the conflict between socialism and the market economy.

Chapter 39, "Economics and the Essential Problems of Human Existence", explores the relationship between science and life, economics and judgments of value, and economic cognition and human action. Critics argue that science is sterile because it is value-free, but Mises argues that science provides humans with the information they need to properly form their valuations and choose the proper means to achieve their desired ends. He also addresses criticisms that economics smuggles value judgments into its analyses, and that it assumes people are only concerned with material well-being, stating that economics deals with action as such and does not make assumptions about the objectives of action. Finally, Mises discusses the three restrictions on human freedom to act and choose, with the third restriction – the regularity of phenomena due to the connection between means and ends – being the subject of praxeology. If people ignore praxeology's teachings, "they will not annul economics", but "they will stamp out society and the human race."

== Publishing history ==
The German-language predecessor to Human Action, titled Nationalökonomie: Theorie des Handelns und Wirtschaftens, first appeared in 1940. Human Action was not a direct translation of the earlier work, but used its general framework and expanded on it.

Yale University Press published the first edition of Human Action in 1949. When production delays pushed back the planned released date of a revised and expanded second edition, Lyle Munson, publisher of Bookmailer, Inc., suggested that Mises could take the book to another publisher, and offered to publish it himself. Mises used this offer as leverage to get Yale University Press to accelerate its release. The resulting 1963 edition was full of typographical errors, and another one had to be printed quickly afterwards by another editor. Henry Regnery published the revised third edition in 1966.

A posthumous fourth edition was published in 1996, with revisions by Bettina B. Greaves. It is available in hardback single (Liberty Fund, ISBN 0865976309) and four-volume paperback editions (Liberty Fund, ISBN 0865976317), as well as single-volume paperback (Fox & Wilkes, ISBN 0930073185). In 1998, the Ludwig von Mises Institute brought back the first edition as the "Scholar's Edition" (ISBN 0945466242). In 2010, the Ludwig von Mises Institute reissued the first edition as a portable "Pocket Edition" (ISBN 978-1610161459). In 2008, the Ludwig von Mises Institute also published a Study Guide to Human Action written by Robert P. Murphy and Amadeus Gabriel, which aimed to summarise and explain Human Action on a chapter-by-chapter basis, and also included technical notes and study questions.

=== Translations ===
- In Italian (1959) as L'azione umana : trattato di economia, Torino: UTET OCLC 799056504
- In Chinese (1976) as 人的行為 : 經濟學硏論 / Ren de xing wei : jing ji xue yan lun by 台湾銀行經濟硏究室, Taiwan yin hang jin ji yan jiu shi, (Bank of Taiwan) OCLC 33160039
- In French (1985) as L'action humaine: Traité d'économie. Libre échange. Paris : PUF, 1985. ISBN 2130385982
- In Portuguese (1990) as Ação humana: Um tratado de economia. Rio de Janeiro: Instituto Liberal. ISBN 978-8562816055
- In Spanish (1995) as La acción humana: tratado de economía. Madrid: Unión Editorial D.L., ISBN 9788472092921; OCLC 433628807
- In Czech (2006) as Lidské jednání: Pojednání o ekonomii. Prague: Liberální Institut. ISBN 8086389456
- In Polish (2007) as Ludzkie działanie: traktat o ekonomii ISBN 978-8392616009; OCLC 749787775
- In Turkish (2008) as İnsan eylemi: iktisat üzerine bir inceleme, Ankara: Liberte Yayınları. ISBN 978-9756201411; OCLC 434438770
- In Japanese (2008) as ヒューマン・アクション: 人間行為の経済学 / Hyūman akushon: Ningen kōi no keizaigaku, 春秋社, Tōkyō: Shunjūsha. ISBN 978-4393621837; OCLC 675632995
- In Korean (2009) as 인간행동 ISBN 978-8962283747
- In Bulgarian (2011) as Човешкото действие: Трактат по икономика, София: Издателска къща "МАК" ISBN 978-9548585248
- In Dutch (2016) as Het menselijk handelen: een economische verhandeling, Amsterdam: Stichting Pierson & Templeton. ISBN 978-9082480405
- In Romanian (2002), as „Acțiunea umană. Un tratat de economie" available on-line at http://mises.ro/43/actiunea-umana.
- In Swedish (2021), as Mänskligt handlande, Stockholm: Timbro förlag. ISBN 978-9177032236
- In Russian (2024), as Человеческая деятельность: трактат по экономической теории, Москва. Челябинск: Издательство "Социум". ISBN 978-5916031799

== See also ==
- Action theory
- Demonstrated preference
- Methodenstreit
