= Thymology =

Study of human aspects

In praxeology, thymology is the study of those human aspects that precede or cause purposeful human behavior.

== Praxeology and thymology ==
In his Theory and History, Ludwig von Mises wrote on the relationship between praxeology and thymology:

[Thymology] is what a man knows about the way in which people value different conditions, about their wishes and desires and their plans to realize these wishes and desires. It is the knowledge of the social environment in which a man lives and acts or, with historians, of a foreign milieu about which he has learned by studying special sources. Why one man chooses water and another man wine is a thymological (or, in traditional terminology, psychological) problem. But it is of no concern to praxeology and economics. The subject matter of praxeology and of that part of it which is so far best developed─ economics─ is action as such and not the motives that impel a man to aim at definite ends.

== History ==
Von Mises wrote:

Thymology is a branch of history or, as Collingwood formulated it, it belongs in 'the sphere of history.' It deals with the mental activities of men that determine their actions. It deals with the mental processes that result in a definite kind of behavior, with the reactions of the mind to the conditions of the individual's environment. It deals with something invisible and intangible that cannot be perceived by the methods of the natural sciences. But the natural sciences must admit that this factor must be considered as real also from their point of view, as it is a link in a chain of events that result in changes in the sphere the description of which they consider as the specific field of their studies.

== See also ==
- Behavioral economics
- Bounded rationality
- Cognitive science
- Methodological individualism
- Self-efficacy
- Semiotics
- Social actions
