= Liberalism (book) =

1927 book by Ludwig von Mises

Liberalism: The Classical Tradition
- First edition (German)
- Author: Ludwig von Mises
- Original title: Liberalismus
- Translator: Ralph Raico
- Language: German
- Subject: Classical liberalism, Property
- Publisher: Gustav Fischer Verlag, Liberty Fund
- Publication date: 1927
- Publication place: Weimar Germany
- English publication date: 1962
- Pages: 175 (1927 edition) / 171 (1962 and 2005 editions) / 207 (others)
- OCLC: 473936839

Liberalism (original German title: Liberalismus) is a book by Austrian School economist and libertarian thinker Ludwig von Mises, containing economic analysis and indicting critique of socialism. It was first published in 1927 by Gustav Fischer Verlag in Jena and defending classical liberal ideology based on individual property rights. Starting from the principle of private property, Mises shows how the other classical liberal freedoms follow from property rights and argues that liberalism free of government intervention is required to promote peace, social harmony and the general welfare. The book was translated into English by a student of Mises, Ralph Raico, but its first English edition in 1962 was titled The Free and Prosperous Commonwealth rather than Liberalism, as Mises thought that the literal translation would create confusion because the term liberalism after the New Deal and especially in the 1960s became widely used in the United States to refer to a centre-left politics that supports degrees of government intervention, in opposition to Mises' central premise. The English translation was made available online by the Ludwig von Mises Institute in 2000.

== Publication history ==
=== In German ===
- Ludwig von Mises, Liberalismus. Jena: Gustav Fischer Verlag, 1927.
- Ludwig von Mises, Liberalismus. Sankt Augustin: Academia Verlag, 1993. ISBN 3-88345-428-1.

=== In English ===
The book was translated into English by Ralph Raico.

- Ludwig von Mises, The Free and Prosperous Commonwealth: An Exposition of the Ideas of Classical Liberalism. Princeton, Van Nostrand, 1962
- Ludwig von Mises, Liberalism, a Socio-Economic Exposition (Studies in economic theory). Mission, KS: Sheed Andrews and McMeel, 1978. ISBN 0-8362-5106-7.
- Ludwig von Mises, Liberalism: In The Classical Tradition. Irvington-on-Hudson, NY: Foundation for Economic Education – San Francisco: Cobden Press, 1985. ISBN 0-930439-23-6.
- Ludwig von Mises, Liberalism: The Classical Tradition. Irvington-on-Hudson, NY: Foundation for Economic Education, 1996. ISBN 1-57246-022-9.
- Ludwig von Mises, Liberalism: The Classical Tradition. Indianapolis: Liberty Fund, 2005. ISBN 0-86597-586-8.

=== Reviews ===
- Lemberger, J. (1928). "Liberalismus. by Ludwig Mises". The Economic Journal. 38 (152). Royal Economic Society: 634–5. doi:10.2307/2224114. ISSN 1468-0297. JSTOR 2224114.
