= Ralph Raico =

American historian (1936–2016)

- Born: October 23, 1936; New York City, US
- Died: December 13, 2016 (aged 80)

Academic background
- Education: University of Chicago
- Influences: Friedrich Hayek, Ludwig von Mises, Ayn Rand, Frederic Bastiat, Gustave de Molinari, Alexis de Tocqueville

Academic work
- Main interests: Classical liberalism, libertarianism

Ralph Raico (/ˈreɪkoʊ/; October 23, 1936 – December 13, 2016) was an American libertarian historian of European liberalism, and a professor of history at Buffalo State College.

== Early life and education ==
Raico was from New York City, where he attended the Bronx High School of Science. Through the Foundation for Economic Education, Raico and his classmate George Reisman arranged to meet with economist Ludwig von Mises, who subsequently invited them to attend his graduate seminar on Austrian economics at New York University. There, he met fellow seminar attendee Murray Rothbard, who befriended him. Rothbard and his friends including Raico, Reisman, Ronald Hamowy and Robert Hessen formed a "self-conscious intellectual and activist salon" that they named the Circle Bastiat.

In the mid-1950s, the Circle Bastiat also brought Raico into contact with novelist Ayn Rand and her followers, informally known at the time as The Collective. Raico attended the first lectures about Rand's philosophy of Objectivism. Eventually, relations between the two groups soured, leading to an incident in which the Circle parodied the Collective, performing a skit in which Raico played the part of Rand's protege Nathaniel Branden. By the summer of 1958, Rand and Rothbard had broken off all ties, and the groups stopped associating. Raico received his B.A. from the City College of New York, and his Ph.D. from the University of Chicago, where his adviser was Friedrich Hayek.

== Career ==
While at the University of Chicago, Raico founded The New Individualist Review, a libertarian publication which first published in April 1961 and produced 17 issues until it ceased publication in 1968. Raico and other graduate students comprised the editorial board. Its advisory board comprised Friedrich Hayek, Milton Friedman, and later George Stigler. In 1981, Friedman wrote that he believed the publication had "set an intellectual standard which has not yet, I believe, been matched by any of the more recent publications in the same philosophical tradition".

Raico later became senior editor of Inquiry magazine. He was an associate editor of The Independent Review, a journal published by The Independent Institute, and a senior fellow of the Mises Institute, which published his work on the history of liberty and the connection between war and the state. Raico translated Mises' book Liberalismus and various essays by Hayek into English.

== Death ==
Raico died on December 13, 2016, at the age of 80.

== Publications ==
=== Books ===
- Gay Rights: A Libertarian Approach. Libertarian Party (1975). OCLC 8887435, 863234248.
- Classical Liberalism in the Twentieth Century. Institute for Humane Studies at George Mason University (1990). OCLC 21573481, 732647331.
- Die Partei der Freiheit: Studien zur Geschichte des deutschen Liberalismus. Introduction by Christian Watrin. Translated by Gabriele Bartel, Pia Weiss, and Jörg Guido Hülsmann. Lucius & Lucius (1999). ISBN 9783828200425. OCLC 52523633.
- Great Wars and Great Leaders: A Libertarian Rebuttal. Introduction by Robert Higgs. Auburn, Alabama: Mises Institute (2010) ISBN 1610164377. OCLC 779146130.
- The Place of Religion in the Liberal Philosophy of Constant, Tocqueville, and Lord Acton. (2010). ISBN 1610163680. OCLC 4812933.

Book version of Raico's University of Chicago dissertation.

- Classical Liberalism and the Austrian School. Auburn, Alabama: Mises Institute (2012). ISBN 978-1610160032. OCLC 792741380.

=== Book contributions ===
- "Classical Liberalism and the Austrian School." in The Elgar Companion to Austrian Economics, edited by Peter J. Boettke. Edward Elgar Publishing (1988). ISBN 978-1858787763. OCLC 485335367.
- Introduction to the 50th-anniversary edition of John T. Flynn's The Roosevelt Myth. Fox & Wilkes (1998).ISBN 0930073274. OCLC 41234390.
- "World War I: The Turning Point" and "Rethinking Churchill." in The Costs of War: America's Pyrrhic Victories, edited by John V. Denson. Transaction Publishers (1999). ISBN 0765804875.

== See also ==
- List of Austrian-school economists
