= The Anti-Capitalistic Mentality =

1956 book by Ludwig von Mises

- First edition
- Author: Ludwig von Mises
- Language: English
- Publisher: Van Nostrand, Liberty Fund, Ludwig von Mises Institute
- Publication date: 1956
- Publication place: United States
- Media type: Print (Hardback & Paperback)
- Pages: 114
- ISBN: 0865976716
- OCLC: 265890

The Anti-Capitalistic Mentality is a book written by Austrian School economist and libertarian thinker Ludwig von Mises. It is an investigation into the psychological roots of the anti-capitalistic stance that Mises saw as widespread in the general populations of the capitalist world. Mises suggests various reasons for this mentality, primarily his claim that free competition in the market economy allows for no excuses of one's failures.

== Frustrated ambition ==
"In a society based on caste and status, the individual can ascribe adverse fate to conditions beyond his own control. [For instance] He is a slave because the superhuman powers that determine all becoming had assigned him this rank. [...] It is quite another thing under capitalism. Here everybody's station in life depends on his own doing [...] The sway of the principle, to each according to his accomplishments, does not allow of any excuse for personal shortcomings" (pp. 11–12)

According to the author, faced with this burden many who have fared poorly in the market economy seek a scapegoat to shift the blame from themselves and restore their self-image.

== Capital accumulation ==
According to von Mises, Marxism has heavily influenced the way the general public interprets its economic condition and capitalism in general. The average wage-earner's high standard of living is viewed as an inevitable result of "self-acting progress", akin to Marx's "material productive forces". It is believed that these material productive forces (e.g. technological innovations) are not only independent of capitalism but will eventually force capitalism to yield to more advanced forms of socialist organisation. Until that day the capitalists will continue to refuse workers their fair share of this progress.

The notion of "fair share" is devoid of meaning, because both capital and labour are necessary to produce goods and it is impossible to assign a proportion of the end product as belonging to either labour or capital. He also argues that even more importantly the historical increase in the average wage-earner's rewards is due solely to the accumulation of capital, and in particular to "the fact that the rate of capital accumulation exceeds the rate of increase in population" (p. 88). According to von Mises, "All pseudo-economic doctrines which depreciate the role of saving and capital accumulation are absurd [...] What has improved the wage earners' standard of living is the fact that the capital equipment per head of the men eager to earn wages has increased. It is a consequence of this fact that an ever increasing portion of the total amount of usable goods produced goes to the wage earners" (p. 89)

== Criticism ==
The Economist called it a "resoundingly silly" caricature of economic liberalism and "a sad little book" that is simplistically dogmatic and displays "cocksure superficiality" in an abusive tone. The review suggested that the book would receive "low marks if presented by a second-year undergraduate to his tutor," and that "the case for freedom ... is ill served" by such a book. It accused von Mises of attacking straw men and having contempt for the facts of human nature, comparing him in that respect to Marxists. Conservative commentator and former Communist Whittaker Chambers published a similarly negative review in the National Review, stating that Mises's thesis that anti-capitalist sentiment was rooted in "envy" epitomized "know-nothing conservatism" at its "know-nothingest."

== Publication history ==
- D Van Nostrand Company, 1956
- Libertarian Press, 1981
- Liberty Fund, 2006, ISBN 0865976708 (cloth), ISBN 0865976716 (paperback)
- Ludwig von Mises Institute, 2008 (reprint of the Van Nostrand edition)

=== Translations ===
- German: Die Wurzeln des Antikapitalismus, Frankfurt am Main: Knapp, 1979 ISBN 978-3781902206 OCLC 263642189
- Italian: La mentalità anticapitalistica, Roma: Armando, 1988 OCLC 799240184
- Korean: 자본주의정신과반자본주의심리 / Chabonjuŭi chŏngsin kwa panjabonjuŭi simni, 한국경제연구원, Sŏul Tʻŭkpyŏlsi : Hanʼguk Kyŏngje Yŏnʼguwŏn, 1995 ISBN 978-8980310302 OCLC 53327033
- Polish: Mentalność antykapitalistyczna, Kraków: Wydawnictwo Arcana, 2005 ISBN 978-8386225873 OCLC 749842045
- Spanish: La mentalidad anticapitalista, Valencia: Fundación Ignacio Villalonga, 1957 OCLC 434345549
- Swedish: Den antikapitalistiska mentaliteten, Stockholm: Natur & Kultur, 1957 OCLC 485430415

== See also ==
- Laissez-faire
- Anti-Communism
