= Intrinsic theory of value =

Early theories of value in political economy

In early political economy, intrinsic or objective theories of value were a set of early theories of value holding that the value of an item is an objective property of the item itself. It has since been superseded in economics by the subjective theory of value, which recognizes value as a property that is ascribed to items by a person; as a result, the value of an item to someone can vary depending on personal tastes and preferences. Most such theories look to the process of producing an item, and the costs or resources involved in that process, to identify the item's intrinsic value.

The labour theory of value is an early example of an intrinsic theory, which was originally proposed by Adam Smith and further developed by David Ricardo and Karl Marx. Similarly, the physiocrats based their theory of value in the land.

== See also ==
- Instrumental and intrinsic value
- Marginalism
- Socialist economics
