= Omnipotent Government =

1944 book by Ludwig von Mises

Omnipotent Government: The Rise of the Total State and Total War
- Author: Ludwig von Mises
- Language: English
- Subject: Nazism, nationalism, fascism, socialism, Weimar Republic, Nazi Germany
- Genre: Non-fiction
- Publisher: Yale University Press, Libertarian Press
- Publication date: 1944
- Publication place: United States
- Pages: ix, 291 pp.
- OCLC: 967870

Omnipotent Government: The Rise of the Total State and Total War is a book by Austrian School economist Ludwig von Mises first published in 1944 by Yale University Press. It is one of the most influential writings in American libertarian and right-libertarian social thought and critique of totalitarianism and state socialism, examining the rise of Nazism as an example. The book treats Nazism as a species of orthodox socialist theory. At the same time, the book offers a critique of economic interventionism, industrial central planning, the welfare state, and world government, denouncing the trends of the Western Allies towards the total state. The book was made available online by the Ludwig von Mises Institute in 2004.

== See also ==
- The Road to Serfdom
