= Marginal Revolution =

Marginal Revolution may refer to:

- the development of economic theory in the late 19th century which explained economic behavior in terms of marginal utility and related concepts:
  - Marginal utility § Marginal Revolution
  - Marginalism § Marginal Revolution
- Marginal Revolution (blog), an economics blog co-authored by Tyler Cowen and Alex Tabarrok
