= Subjective theory of value =

Economic theory proposed by Austrian scholar Carl Menger

The subjective theory of value (STV) is an economic theory for explaining how the value of goods and services are not only established but also how they can fluctuate over time. The contrasting system is typically known as the labor theory of value.

STV's development helped to better understand human action and decision making in economics. The theory claims that the value of a good is not determined by any inherent property of the good, nor by the cumulative value of components or labor needed to produce it, but instead is determined by the individuals or entities who are buying (and/or selling) that good.

Thus a good's value may increase substantially following its creation if the good is perceived as being of greater importance, or as being more desirable than before. There are many variables that can influence this process, including, but not limited to, changes in the age of the good, personal affinity, cultural significance, scarcity, as well as situational circumstances. This is often seen in the case of collectable items such as cars, vinyl records, and comic books.

An additional variable, as Austrian economist Carl Menger pointed out, is the estimation of a good's value due to uncertainty and lack of knowledge, in which people "sometimes estimate the importance of various satisfactions in a manner contrary to their real importance".

It is one of several theories that sprang from the marginal revolution, which was a departure from classical economics, and in particular STV departed from the labor theory of value. The modern version of the subjective theory of value was created independently and nearly simultaneously by William Stanley Jevons, Léon Walras, and Carl Menger in the late 19th century. The theory has helped explain why the value of non-essential goods can be higher than essential ones, and how relatively expensive goods can have relatively low production costs.

== Overview ==
According to the subjective theory of value, by assuming that all trades between individuals are voluntary, it can be concluded that both parties to the trade subjectively perceive the goods, labour or money they receive, as being of higher value to the goods, labour or money they give away. The theory holds that one can create value simply by trading with someone who values the items higher, without necessarily modifying them. Wealth is understood to refer to individuals' subjective valuation of their possessions, and voluntary trades may increase the total wealth in society. This is because each participant of the voluntary transaction has gained more value than they originally had.

This suggests that items cannot be objectively valued as any value placed upon the item is only correct if both buyer and seller agree on the price and a transaction takes place. A seller may value an item in their possession higher than any buyer will value it leading to either a price reduction until the item's price equals a buyer's value of the item, or the seller will continue to value the item higher than any buyer and no transaction will occur.

Individuals will experience more radical improvements to life and satisfaction from acquiring the first unit of a good compared to the marginal utility from acquiring additional units of a good. They will initially prioritise obtaining the goods they most need (of central, not marginal utility), such as essential food, but once their need for it is satisfied up to a certain level, their desire for other luxury or surplus goods will begin to rise, and the satisfaction obtained from the original essential goods will diminish.

Proponents of the theory also believe that in a free market, competition between individuals seeking to trade goods they possess and services they can provide for goods they perceive as being of higher value to them results in a market equilibrium set of prices emerging. This occurs during auctions. Bidders are able to express their belief in the value of each item via bids. As each person raises their bid, the value of the item rises even though the nature and function of the item has not changed. This behaviour can lead to the winner's curse.

== Labour theory of value ==
Classical economists such as David Ricardo proposed a labour theory of value that states there is a direct correlation between the value of a good and the labour required to produce the good, concluding "The value of a commodity, or the quantity of any other commodity for which it will exchange, depends on the relative quantity of labour which is necessary for its production, and not on the greater or less compensation which is paid for that labour." Ricardo clarified that this correlation did not effectively connect those with market prices, or 'value in exchange', seeing them as separately derived from the quantity of labour input and other production factors. Increasing wages would not necessarily cause price rises, but conversely price rises may not cause wages to increase.

Carl Menger argued that production was simply another case of the theory of marginal utility, and that labourers' wage-earning potential is set by the value of their work to others rather than subsistence costs, and they work because they value remuneration more highly than inactivity.

A combination of both labour and subjective theories can be seen in the formulations of English economist Alfred Marshall. He argued that prices are determined by both the objective costs of production, the supply, and the subjective utility of consumers, the demand. This approach is in line with the modern conception of how market prices are determined, where both the demand and supply curves intersect. This is in contrast to other 19th century theories which view costs through a type of subjective value lens. Since the subjective value holds that buyers use their own value judgements, the same goes for sellers, and thus the mechanism of production. Austrian economist Ludwig von Mises believed that production costs are determined by a seller's evaluations of their opportunity costs, or the sellers "marginal utility lost of having fewer of that good". If true, he reasoned, then supply curves would also be set by subjective preferences.

== See also ==
- Advertising
- Behavioral economics
- Consumer capitalism
- Distribution of wealth
- Expected utility hypothesis
- Intrinsic theory of value
- Labour theory of value
- Marginalism
- Marketing
- Objectivism
- Peer pressure
- Power theory of value
- Religious values
- Social comparison theory
- Use value
- Value (ethics and social sciences)
- Value theory
