= Ludwig von Mises =

Austrian–American political economist (1881–1973)

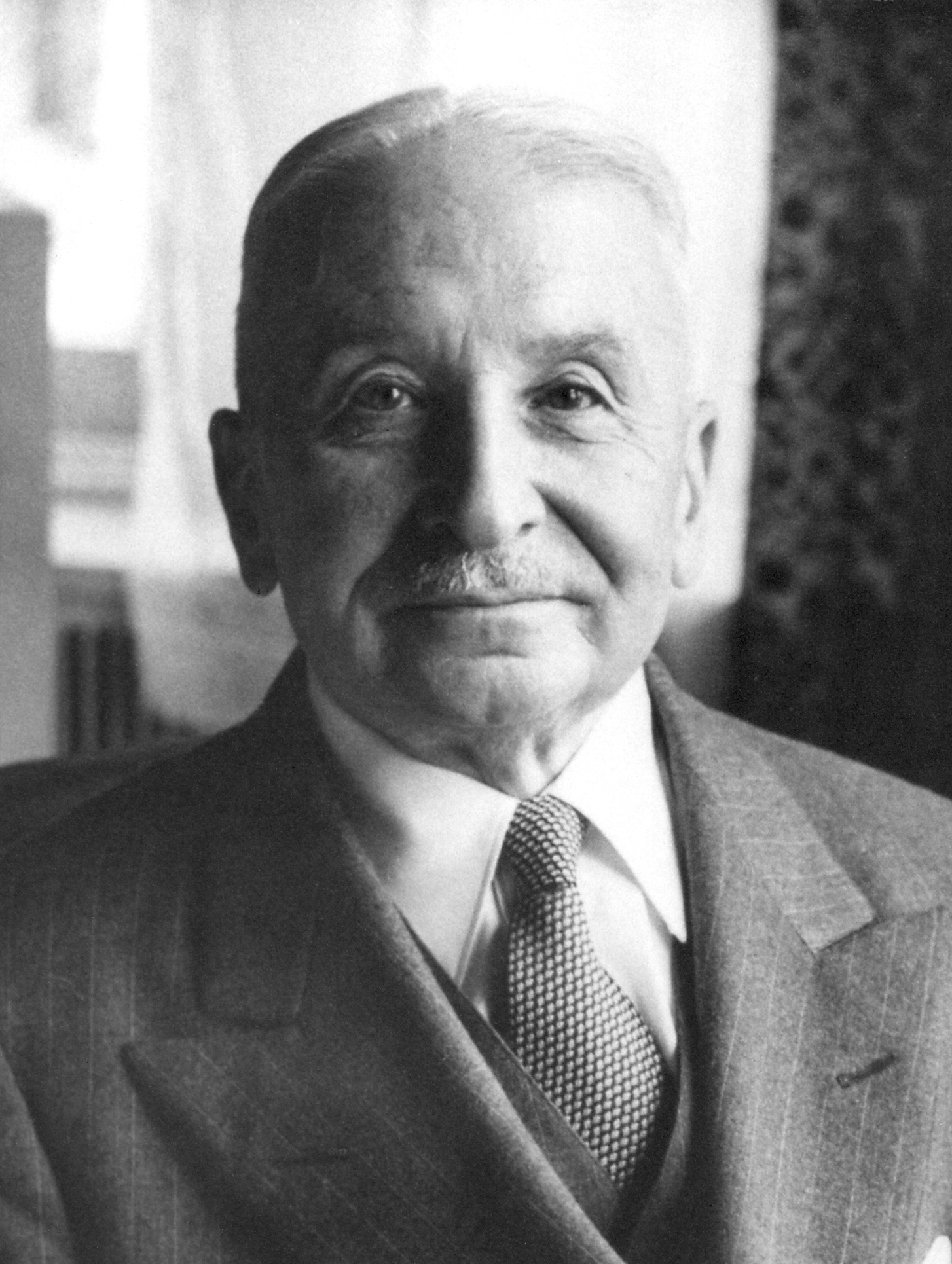
- Born: Ludwig Heinrich Edler von Mises; September 29, 1881; Lemberg, Austria-Hungary (now in Ukraine)
- Died: October 10, 1973 (aged 92); New York City, US
- Resting place: Ferncliff Cemetery, Hartsdale, New York, US
- Spouse: Margit von Mises
- Relatives: Richard von Mises (brother); Gitta Sereny (stepdaughter)

Academic background
- Education: University of Vienna
- Thesis: Die Entwicklung des gutsherrlich-bäuerlichen Verhältnisses in Galizien (1772–1848) (1902)
- Doctoral advisor: Carl Grünberg
- Other advisor: Eugen von Böhm-Bawerk
- Influences: Carl Menger; Eugen Böhm von Bawerk; Friedrich von Wieser; Edmund Husserl; Frank Fetter; Max Weber; Jean-Baptiste Say; Immanuel Kant; Sigmund Freud

Academic work
- School or tradition: Austrian School
- Institutions: University of Vienna (1919–1934); Geneva Graduate Institute (1934–1940); New York University (1945–1969)
- Doctoral students: Gottfried Haberler; Fritz Machlup; Oskar Morgenstern; Gerhard Tintner; Israel Kirzner; Friedrich Hayek
- Notable students: Adam Heydel; Leonard Liggio; Hans Sennholz; Ralph Raico; George Reisman; Murray Rothbard
- Main interests: Political economy; Philosophy of science; Libertarianism
- Notable ideas: Austrian business cycle theory; Catallactics; Economic calculation problem; Methodological dualism; Praxeology

Ludwig Heinrich von Mises (/vɒn ˈmiːzɪz/; German: [ˈluːtvɪç fɔn ˈmiːzəs]; September 29, 1881 – October 10, 1973) was an Austrian and American political economist and philosopher of the Austrian school. Mises wrote and lectured extensively on the social contributions of classical liberalism and the central role of consumers in a market economy. He is best known for his work in praxeology, particularly for studies comparing communism and capitalism, as well as for being a defender of classical liberalism in the face of rising illiberalism and authoritarianism throughout much of Europe during the 20th century.

Since the mid-20th century, both libertarian and classical liberal movements, as well as the field of economics as a whole, have been strongly influenced by Mises's writings. Economist Tyler Cowen lists his writings as "the most important works of the 20th century" and as "among the most important economics articles, ever". Entire schools of thought trace their origins to Mises's early work, including the development of anarcho-capitalist philosophy through Murray Rothbard and the contemporary Austrian economics program led by scholars such as Peter Boettke at George Mason University.

Mises's most influential work, Human Action: A Treatise on Economics (1949), laid out his comprehensive theory of praxeology—a deductive, a priori method for understanding human decision-making and economic behavior. Rejecting empirical and mathematical modeling, Mises defended classical liberalism and market coordination as products of rational individual action. Beyond his published works, Mises shaped generations of economists through his longstanding private seminar in Vienna and later as a professor at New York University. His ideas deeply influenced students such as Friedrich Hayek, Murray Rothbard, and Israel Kirzner, all of whom helped inspire the rise of postwar libertarian institutions in the United States, including the Foundation for Economic Education and the Ludwig von Mises Institute.

Mises received many honors throughout the course of his lifetime—honorary doctorates from Grove City College (1957), New York University (1963), and the University of Freiburg (1964) in Germany. His accomplishments were recognized in 1956 by his alma mater, the University of Vienna, when his doctorate was memorialized on its 50th anniversary and "renewed", a European tradition, and in 1962 by the Austrian government. He was also cited in 1969 as "Distinguished Fellow" by the American Economic Association.

== Biography ==
=== Early life ===
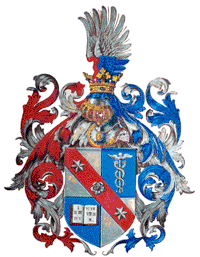
Coat of arms of Mises's great-grandfather Mayer Rachmiel Mises, awarded upon his 1881 ennoblement by Franz Joseph I

Ludwig Heinrich Edler von Mises was born on September 29, 1881, into an Austrian-Jewish family in Lemberg, then the capital of the Kingdom of Galicia and Lodomeria, Austro-Hungarian Empire, and now part of Ukraine. A few months prior, his paternal great-grandfather Mayer Rachmiel Mises had been ennobled, receiving the honorific Edler (indicating a non-landed noble family) and the right to add the nobiliary particle von to his name; the Mises family had been involved in financing and constructing railroads. Mises's mother, Adele (née Landau), was a niece of Joachim Landau, a Liberal Party deputy to the Imperial Council of Austria. His father, Arthur von Mises (died 1903), was stationed in Lemberg as a construction engineer with the Czernowitz Railway Company. Mises had a younger brother, Richard, a mathematician, probability theorist, and Vienna Circle member.

By the age of 12, Mises spoke fluent German, Polish, and French, read Latin, and could understand Ukrainian. From 1892 to 1900, he was educated at the Akademisches Gymnasium in Vienna. He then entered the University of Vienna to study law and the social sciences, initially in preparation for a career as a civil servant. There, Mises first encountered the works of Carl Menger, whose book Principles of Economics came to influence him significantly. In 1902, he published his doctoral thesis on the institutional and economic changes affecting the relations between landlords and peasants in Galicia from 1772 to the abolition of peasant serfdom in 1848, written under the guidance of the Austromarxist economist Carl Grünberg. In 1906, he was awarded his doctorate from the school of law. From 1913 to 1938, he was a professor at the university and mentored Friedrich Hayek.

=== Relationship with Poland and Galicia ===
Although Ludwig von Mises identified as Austrian, his upbringing in Lemberg (now Lviv), the capital of Austrian Galicia, deeply influenced his early intellectual development. The region was a cultural "melting pot" where the Polish landed gentry and intelligentsia held significant social influence. By the age of 12, Mises was fluent in Polish, which was the dominant language of the city's administration and high culture. Mises's first major scholarly work, published in 1902, was an economic history of the region titled The Development of the Relation between Lord and Peasant in Galicia (1772–1848) (Die Entwicklung des gutsherrlich-bäuerlichen Verhältnisses in Galizien). In it, he analyzed the transition from feudalism to a liberal land-tenure system, showing an early interest in the mechanics of legal and economic freedom.

Throughout his life, Mises expressed an affinity for the Polish tradition of "Golden Liberty." He viewed the historical Polish–Lithuanian Commonwealth as a precursor to modern classical liberalism due to its decentralized power and resistance to absolute monarchy. He specifically praised the Polish victory over the Bolsheviks in the 1920 Battle of Warsaw, characterizing it as a defense of Western civilization against Eastern despotism. Biographers have noted that the "freedom-loving spirit" of the Galician Polish nobility remained a permanent part of his character, even after his move to Vienna and later the United States.

=== Life in Europe ===
In the years from 1904 to 1914, Mises attended lectures given by Austrian economist Eugen von Böhm-Bawerk. He graduated in February 1906 (Juris Doctor) and started a career as a civil servant in Austria's financial administration.

After a few months, he left to take a trainee position in a Vienna law firm. During that time, Mises began lecturing on economics and in early 1909 joined the Austrian Chamber of Commerce and Industry, serving as economic advisor to the Austrian government until he left Austria in 1934. During World War I, Mises served as a front officer in the Austro-Hungarian artillery and as an economic advisor to the War Department.

Mises was chief economist for the Austrian Chamber of Commerce and was an economic advisor of Engelbert Dollfuss, the austrofascist Austrian Chancellor. Later, Mises was economic advisor to Otto von Habsburg, the Christian democratic politician and claimant to the throne of Austria (which had been legally abolished in 1918 following the Great War). In 1934, Mises left Austria for Geneva, Switzerland, where he was a professor at the Graduate Institute of International Studies until 1940. Mises was invited to the Colloque Walter Lippmann, organized in Paris in 1938, and was a founding member of the Mont Pelerin Society in 1947.

While in Switzerland, Mises married Margit Herzfeld Serény, a former actress and widow of Ferdinand Serény. She was the mother of Gitta Sereny.

=== World War I ===
During World War I, Ludwig von Mises was drafted by the Austrian government, despite being ideologically and morally opposed to the war. Like many who served in the front lines, he rarely spoke about his personal experiences, and even his Memoirs (1940) omits a detailed account of his time in the military. However, he briefly alluded to the harsh realities of war in his seminal work, Human Action (1949):

Nothing is fair in war. It is not just that God is for the big battalions and that those who are better equipped defeat poorly equipped adversaries. It is not just that those in the front line shed their life-blood in obscurity, while the commanders, comfortably located in headquarters hundreds of miles behind the trenches, gain glory and fame. It is not just that John is killed and Mark crippled for the rest of his life, while Paul returns home safe and sound and enjoys all the privileges accorded to veterans. It may be admitted that it is not "fair" that war enhances the profits of those entrepreneurs who contribute best to the equipment of the fighting forces. But it would be foolish to deny that the profit system produces the best weapons.

In Memoirs (1940), the only thing he had to say about the war was how it affected his work:

By the end of 1917, I was no longer at the front, but worked in Vienna in the economics division of the Department of War. I wrote only two small essays during those years.

The same chapter concludes with how he coped with his involuntary servitude fighting as the aggressor in a war he wanted nothing to do with, and includes a quote from Virgil that would go on to become the slogan of the Mises Institute in Alabama:

How one carries on in the face of unavoidable catastrophe is a matter of temperament. In high school, as was custom, I had chosen a verse by Virgil to be my motto: Tu ne cede malis sed contra audentior ito ('Do not give in to evil, but proceed ever more boldly against it'). I recalled these words during the darkest hours of the war.

It was during this service that he observed the war economy of Austria-Hungary, which would serve as the basis for his essay Economic Calculation in the Socialist Commonwealth (Die Wirtschaftsrechnung im sozialistischen Gemeinwesen), delivered first as a lecture to the Society for National Economy (Nationalökonomische Gesellschaft) in 1919 before being published in 1920.

=== Interwar period: founding the Austrian Institute and fleeing the Nazis ===
In 1927 Ludwig von Mises alongside fellow economist Friedrich August von Hayek established the Austrian Institute for Business-Cycle Research. The institute was modeled after Ernst Wagemann's Berlin-based Institute for Business-Cycle Research. After the war, the institute was revived by Franz Nemschak as the Austrian Institute of Economic Research.

In 1934, Mises fled from Austria to Switzerland to escape the Nazis, and in 1940 he emigrated from Switzerland to the United States. On the day German forces entered Vienna during the Anschluss, they raided his apartment, confiscating his papers and library. These were believed to be lost or destroyed until rediscovered decades later in the Soviet archives in Moscow by Richard Ebeling and his wife Anna. At that time, Mises was living in Geneva, Switzerland. However, with the imminent Nazi occupation of France threatening to isolate Switzerland within Axis-controlled territory, he and his wife fled through France and reached the United States via Spain and Portugal.

=== Work in the United States ===
External videos
- Bettina Greaves on Ludwig von Mises's Life (1994)

In 1940, Mises and his wife arrived in New York City. He had come to the United States under a grant by the Rockefeller Foundation. Like many other classical liberal scholars who fled to the United States, he received support from the William Volker Fund to obtain a position in American universities. Mises became a visiting professor at New York University and held this position from 1945 until his retirement in 1969, though he was not salaried by the university. Businessman and libertarian commentator Lawrence Fertig, a member of the New York University Board of Trustees, funded Mises and his work.

For part of this period, Mises studied currency issues for the Pan-Europa movement, which was led by Richard von Coudenhove-Kalergi, a fellow New York University faculty member and Austrian exile. In 1947, Mises became one of the founding members of the Mont Pelerin Society.

In 1962, Mises received the Austrian Decoration for Science and Art for political economy at the Austrian Embassy in Washington, D.C.

Mises retired from teaching at the age of 87 and died on October 10, 1973, at age 92. He is buried at Ferncliff Cemetery in Hartsdale, New York. Grove City College houses the 20,000-page archive of Mises papers and unpublished works. The personal library of Mises was given to Hillsdale College as bequeathed in his will.

At one time, Mises praised the work of writer Ayn Rand, and she generally looked on his work with favor, but the two had a volatile relationship, with strong disagreements for example over the moral basis of capitalism. The two thinkers' disagreement reached a critical point during a dinner conversation where Mises reportedly lost his temper and agreed that Rand was "a little Jewish girl who doesn’t know anything" during a heated argument, despite himself being Jewish. This was thought by Hazlitt, who recounted the anecdote, to be caused by impaired hearing on Mises' part.

=== Creation of the Mises Institute ===
As a result of the economic works of Ludwig Von Mises, the Mises Institute was founded in 1982 by Lew Rockwell, Burton Blumert, and Murray Rothbard, following a split between the Cato Institute and Rothbard, who had been one of the founders of the Cato Institute. It was funded by Ron Paul.

The Mises Institute offers thousands of free books written by Ludwig Von Mises, Murray Rothbard, Hans-Hermann Hoppe, and other prominent economists in e-book and audiobook format. The Mises Institute also offers a series of summer seminars.

== Contributions and influence in economics ==
Ludwig von Mises made significant contributions to the field of economics initially by seeking to integrate the teachings of Carl Menger and Eugen von Böhm-Bawerk into the classical economic framework of his time. He recognized the need to reformulate economic epistemology, particularly in response to the challenges introduced by the subjective value theory and the subjectivity of individual agents. Later, Mises made groundbreaking contributions to economic theory, particularly in advancing the Austrian School of Economics by developing his own transformative ideas, including praxeology—a systematic framework for understanding human action—and the economic calculation problem, which challenged the feasibility of socialism. Mises was also a forerunner in the movement to unite microeconomics and macroeconomics, arguing that macroeconomic phenomena have microeconomic foundations—nearly 50 years before this perspective was widely adopted by mainstream economics.

Ludwig von Mises acknowledged that, by the time of his writing, many core concepts from the Austrian school of economics had been integrated into mainstream economic thought. He noted that the distinctions between the Austrian school and other economic traditions had blurred, making the label "Austrian" more of a historical reference than a marker of a distinct, contemporary doctrine. This integration occurred as concepts like marginal utility, opportunity cost, and the importance of subjective value became widely accepted among economists.

=== Economic calculation problem ===
In 1920, Mises introduced the economic calculation problem as a critique of socialist states which are based on planned economies and renunciations of the price mechanism.

In his first article "Economic Calculation in the Socialist Commonwealth", Mises describes the nature of the price system under capitalism and describes how individual subjective values are translated into the objective information necessary for rational allocation of resources in society. This reframed socialism as a technical problem rather than a moral or political one. Mises argued the absence of market pricing results in inefficiencies within the economic system because central planners are deprived of the crucial information regarding opportunity costs needed to make informed decisions about resource allocation. He wrote that "rational economic activity is impossible in a socialist commonwealth". While this essay did not receive much attention at the time, it would go on to serve as the backbone of many of the works of F. A. Hayek, and debate surrounding it would be pivotal in the Austrian revival that surrounded Hayek's 1974 Nobel Prize.

Mises developed his critique of socialism more completely in his 1922 book Socialism: An Economic and Sociological Analysis, arguing that the market price system is an expression of praxeology and cannot be replicated by any form of bureaucracy.

=== Value-neutrality (wertfreiheit) ===
Mises used the term "catallactics", which originally came from the Greek word katallasso, meaning 'to exchange' or 'to reconcile', to describe the theory of market exchange in economics.

Mises emphasized that catallactics explains prices as they are, rather than as they "should" be. By adopting a value-neutral stance, it does not judge whether a price is "too high" or "too low", or "fair" or "unfair"; instead, it seeks to explain why a price exists at a particular level based on the interplay of supply and demand.

By focusing on prices as they are, catallactics aimed to avoid the pitfalls of culturally or ideologically biased assumptions, where economic policies are designed around idealized notions of what "ought" to happen, (i.e. some works that aim to prescribe the economy, not just describe it) which Mises argued carried them outside of the realm of the descriptive (or wertfrei) sciences. For Mises, introducing normative judgments transforms economics from a descriptive science into an ideological discourse.

=== Praxeology ===
In his magnum opus Human Action (1949), Mises established praxeology as the foundational methodology for the social sciences, offering a systematic approach to understanding human behavior and decision-making. This work laid the groundwork for a comprehensive economic theory that accounted for the subjective nature of value and the complexity of individual choices, marking a significant departure from the objective models of classical economics.

Mises used praxeology to further critique socialism, arguing that it is fundamentally flawed because it treats economics as a solvable, static problem akin to mathematical or engineering challenges. Instead, he argued, economics involves an open-ended coordination process that aims to align the diverse and equally valid subjective appraisals of millions of individuals.

However, while praxeology has been influential within the Austrian school of economics, it is not widely adopted in contemporary economic practice, which predominantly relies on empirical and mathematical methods to analyze and predict economic phenomena. Most mainstream economists view praxeology as lacking empirical validation and testability, thereby limiting its acceptance as a scientific approach within the broader discipline.

=== Personal connections ===
Friends and students of Mises in Europe included Wilhelm Röpke and Alfred Müller-Armack (advisors to German chancellor Ludwig Erhard), Jacques Rueff (monetary advisor to Charles de Gaulle), Gottfried Haberler (later a professor at Harvard), Lionel, Lord Robbins (of the London School of Economics), Italian President Luigi Einaudi, and Leonid Hurwicz, recipient of the 2007 Nobel Memorial Prize in Economic Sciences.

Economist and political theorist Friedrich Hayek first came to know Mises while working as his subordinate at a government office dealing with Austria's post-World War I debt. While toasting Mises at a party in 1956, Hayek said: "I came to know him as one of the best educated and informed men I have ever known".

Mises's seminars in Vienna fostered lively discussion among established economists there. The meetings were also visited by other important economists who happened to be traveling through Vienna.

At his New York University seminar and at informal meetings at his apartment, Mises attracted college and high school students who had heard of his European reputation. They listened while he gave carefully prepared lectures from notes. (Note: On Mises's influence, see Rothbard, Murray, The Essential Ludwig von Mises, 2nd printing, the Ludwig von Mises Institute, 1983; on Eastman's conversion "from Marx to Mises", see Diggins, John P., Up From Communism Harper & Row, 1975, pp. 201–233; on Mises's students and seminar attendees, see Mises, Margit von, My Years with Ludwig von Mises, Arlington House, 1976, 2nd enlarged edit., Center for Future Education, 1984.)

== Views on the methodology and epistemology of economics ==
In his economic studies, Mises concerned himself with the persons making decisions. He maintained that organizations such as the government, class, and association did not perform any action since only persons could perform actions. Group action depended upon the perception of the people forming the group. Mises stated that there had to be different approaches for social science than those used in natural sciences due to the purposeful nature of the actions of human beings. As reported by Reinhard Neck, Mises has gone to extremes in methodological individualism, which was inspired by Max Weber.

In the theory of Mises, "action" denotes a situation where a person engages in an act intentionally to achieve an objective. When Mises refers to actions as being "rational," it does not imply that all actions undertaken by individuals are necessarily intelligent, informed, and effective. What he means is that individuals apply some mechanism in an attempt to realize their objectives.

"Mises coined the word 'praxeology' for the investigation of all human action." He considered economics as the highest developed branch of praxeology. The starting point of his approach was a single self-evident proposition that men act purposefully. Then he logically deduced from this what consequences follow from human actions and decisions. Mises held that the basic propositions of praxeology are known prior to any experience and thus cannot be discovered through observations. This is why he regarded such conclusions as infallible as those of mathematics. Cardwell says Mises used an apriorist method — the core ideas and the conclusions drawn from them were based on logic, not on testing with real-world data.

Various scholars offer their views on Mises’ apriorism differently. While some refer to it as an extreme form of rationalism, others regard it as a milder one, which is either fallibilist, pragmatic, or conventionalist. As noted by Scott Scheall, “these interpretations do not readily fit together,” and he goes on to warn that “no one interpretation does full justice to what Mises had in mind or to the general methodology of the Austrians.” Cardwell points out that Austrian economists have not all used the same method. Many of them did not follow Mises's apriorism.

Mises never rejected the empirical or historical approach to inquiry. His position was that considering historical facts or statistics cannot confirm or refute the universal principles of praxeology. The reason was that human actions do not generate constants which can be measured experimentally; economics generally lacks such controlled experiments with only one variable being altered. This approach he labeled "methodological dualism" in his book "Theory and History" since the study of human thought and action requires a separate approach than the study of natural phenomena.

However, within such a methodological framework, Mises considered that there was room for empirical evidence, which could be useful in discovering instances in which a theory was applicable, explaining historical events, and making useful predictions. According to Caldwell, the praxeologists do not oppose the empirical methods of investigation, but rather consider it in a different way. According to Leeson & Boettke, it would be misleading to characterize Mises as someone who was simply opposed to the empirical approach in economics.

Another concept criticized by Mises is what he referred to as polylogism. According to him, Theory and History applied the term to views asserting that human thinking does not have a common rational pattern. In Human Action, Mises discussed theories stating that various social classes or races had their peculiar logic. His argument was that the difference in interests, values, ideas, and social setting did not necessarily imply the existence of different reasoning patterns applicable to particular people. Recent scholars dispute Mises's claim that all human minds share the same logical structure. Lourenço and Mouna call this, and his idea of rational action, central but controversial parts of his method.

== Political views ==
Ludwig von Mises was a steadfast advocate of liberalism, particularly classical liberalism. He believed that while Marx provided a powerful critique of capitalism, he failed to offer a constructive vision of a socialist society that could be practically implemented. To learn from this mistake, after publishing his lengthy critique of socialism, Theory and History: An Interpretation of Social and Economic Evolution, in his next book, Liberalism (1927), Mises articulated a positive vision of free society rooted in individual liberty, private property, free markets, and limited government coercion. He argued that these principles are essential for creating a peaceful and prosperous society.

=== Advocacy of laissez-faire ===
Throughout his life Mises argued that only a free market system, where individuals are free to pursue their own interests, can efficiently allocate resources and maximize social welfare. He was critical of central planning, in particular due to the Economic calculation problem.

In his 1956 book The Anti-Capitalistic Mentality, Mises explored the psychological roots of intellectual opposition to the free market; in his view, this opposition comes from an unwarranted resentment toward the necessity of obeying mass demand, which is the basis of prosperity in big business.

=== Foreign policy ===
Mises advocated for economic non-interventionism and was a staunch anti-imperialist. He viewed the Great War as a watershed moment in human history, arguing that it marked a significant departure from previous conflicts due to the advanced technology employed. His experience in the First World War led to a lifelong obsession of finding a workable doctrine of peace among nations, which at the same time would not ask any individual nation to give up their own self interest. Regarding the birth of total war, Mises wrote:

War has become more fearful and destructive than ever before because it is now waged with all the means of the highly developed technique that the free economy has created. Bourgeois civilization has built railroads and electric power plants, has invented explosives and airplanes, in order to create wealth. Imperialism has placed the tools of peace in the service of destruction. With modern means, it would be easy to wipe out humanity at one blow.

=== Comments about fascism and Nazism ===
Marxists Herbert Marcuse and Perry Anderson as well as German writer Claus-Dieter Krohn accused Mises of writing approvingly of Italian fascism, especially for its suppression of leftist elements, in his 1927 book Liberalism. In 2009, economist J. Bradford DeLong and sociologist Richard Seymour repeated the accusation. In the book, Mises writes:

It cannot be denied that Fascism and similar movements aiming at the establishment of dictatorships are full of the best intentions and that their intervention has, for the moment, saved European civilization. The merit that Fascism has thereby won for itself will live on eternally in history.

Mises biographer Jörg Guido Hülsmann says that critics who suggest that Mises supported fascism are "absurd" as he notes that the full quote describes fascism as dangerous. He notes that Mises said it was a "fatal error" to think that it was more than an "emergency makeshift" against up-and-coming communism and socialism as exemplified by the Bolsheviks in Russia and the surging communists of Germany. Hülsmann writes in Mises: The Last Knight of Liberalism that Mises had been a card-carrying member of the Fatherland Front party and that this was "probably mandatory for all employees of public and semi-public organizations".

In his earlier work, Socialism (1922), Mises remarked that Mussolini did his best to prop up Austria-Hungary as a means of protecting Italian-speaking minorities, but regardless concludes that he was one the most wretched figures in history.

In regards to Nazism, Mises called on the Allies in his 1944 book Omnipotent Government to "smash Nazism" and to "fight desperately until the Nazi power is completely broken". In his Notes and recollections, Mises wrote of his experience being personally persecuted by the Nazis for his attacks on the Italian Fascist and German Nazi Parties.

=== Central banking ===
Mises was strongly opposed to central banking, instead preferring either a free banking or gold standard system. He also believed that fiat money and the military industrial complex were interdependent of one another. In 1919, Mises wrote, "one can say without exaggeration that inflation is an indispensable means of militarism. Without it, the repercussions of war on welfare become obvious more quickly and penetratingly; war weariness would set in much earlier."

== Legacy ==
Economic historian Bruce Caldwell wrote that in the mid-20th century, with the ascendance of positivism and Keynesianism, Mises came to be regarded by many as the "archetypal 'unscientific' economist". In a 1957 review of his book The Anti-Capitalistic Mentality, The Economist said of Mises: "Professor von Mises has a splendid analytical mind and an admirable passion for liberty; but as a student of human nature he is worse than null and as a debater he is of Hyde Park standard". Conservative commentator Whittaker Chambers published a similarly negative review of that book in the National Review, stating that Mises's thesis that anti-capitalist sentiment was rooted in "envy" epitomized "know-nothing conservatism" at its "know-nothingest". More recent commenters, such as Tyler Cowen of George Mason University, have listed it alongside Socialism (1922), and Liberalism (1927) as one of the most important books of the 20th century, despite describing Human Action (1949) as "cranky and dogmatic". In the same blog post, Cowen states that:

Socialism is still the best and also historically most important critique of socialism, ever. His earlier articles about the impossibility of economic calculation under socialism are among the most important economics articles, ever.

Scholar Scott Scheall called economist Terence Hutchison "the most persistent critic of Mises's apriorism", starting in Hutchison's 1938 book The Significance and Basic Postulates of Economic Theory and in later publications such as his 1981 book The Politics and Philosophy of Economics: Marxians, Keynesians, and Austrians. Scheall noted that Friedrich Hayek, later in his life (after Mises died), also expressed reservations about Mises's apriorism, such as in a 1978 interview where Hayek said that he "never could accept the ... almost eighteenth-century rationalism in his [Mises's] argument".

In a 1978 interview, Hayek said about Mises's book Socialism:

At first we all felt he was frightfully exaggerating and even offensive in tone. You see, he hurt all our deepest feelings, but gradually he won us around, although for a long time I had to – I just learned he was usually right in his conclusions, but I was not completely satisfied with his argument.

Hayek viewed Mises as one of the major figures in the revival of classical liberalism in the post-war era. Hayek's work "The Transmission of the Ideals of Freedom" (1951) pays high tribute to the influence of Mises in the 20th-century libertarian movement.

Economist Milton Friedman considered Mises inflexible in his thinking, but added that Mises's difficult life, persecution by Nazis, and lack of acceptance by academia are the likely culprits:

The story I remember best happened at the initial Mont Pelerin meeting when he got up and said, "You're all a bunch of socialists." We were discussing the distribution of income, and whether you should have progressive income taxes. Some of the people there were expressing the view that there could be a justification for it. Another occasion which is equally telling: Fritz Machlup was a student of Mises's, one of his most faithful disciples. At one of the Mont Pelerin meetings, Machlup gave a talk in which I think he questioned the idea of a gold standard; he came out in favor of floating exchange rates. Mises was so mad he wouldn't speak to Machlup for three years. Some people had to come around and bring them together again. It's hard to understand; you can get some understanding of it by taking into account how people like Mises were persecuted in their lives.

Economist Murray Rothbard, who studied under Mises, agreed he was uncompromising, but disputes reports of his abrasiveness. In his words, Mises was "unbelievably sweet, constantly finding research projects for students to do, unfailingly courteous, and never bitter" about the discrimination he received at the hands of the economic establishment of his time.

After Mises died, his widow Margit quoted a passage that he had written about Benjamin Anderson. She said it best described Mises's own personality:

His most eminent qualities were his inflexible honesty, his unhesitating sincerity. He never yielded. He always freely enunciated what he considered to be true. If he had been prepared to suppress or only to soften his criticisms of popular, but irresponsible, policies, the most influential positions and offices would have been offered him. But he never compromised.

== Works ==
- The Theory of Money and Credit (1912, enlarged US edition 1953)
  - Full text available.
- Nation, State, and Economy (1919)
  - Full text available.
- Economic Calculation in the Socialist Commonwealth (1920) (long-form essay)
  - Full text available.
- Socialism: An Economic and Sociological Analysis (1922, 1932, 1951)
  - Full text available.
- Liberalism: In the Classical Tradition (1927, 1962)
  - Full text available.
- A Critique of Interventionism (1929) (collection of essays)
  - Full text available.
- Epistemological Problems of Economics (1933, 1960)
  - Full text available.
- Memoirs (1940)
  - Full text available.
- Interventionism: An Economic Analysis (1941, 1998)
- Omnipotent Government: The Rise of Total State and Total War (1944)
  - Full text available.
- Bureaucracy (1944, 1962)
  - Full text available.
- Economic planning. With Rufus S. Tucker. New York : Dynamic America, 1945.
- Planned Chaos (1947, added to 1951 edition of Socialism)
  - Full text available.
- Human Action: A Treatise on Economics (1949, 1963, 1966, 1996)
  - Full text available.
- Planning for Freedom (1952, enlarged editions in 1962, 1974, and 1980) (Collection of essays and addresses)
  - Full text available.
- The Anti-Capitalistic Mentality (1956)
  - Full text available.
- Theory and History: An Interpretation of Social and Economic Evolution (1957)
  - Full text available.
- The Ultimate Foundation of Economic Science (1962)
  - Full text available.
- The Historical Setting of the Austrian School of Economics (1969) (long-form essay)
  - Full text available.
- Notes and Recollections (1978, written in 1940–41)
- On the Manipulation of Money and Credit (1978) (collection of essays, reissued as The Causes of the Economic Crisis)
  - Full text available.
- Economic Policy: Thoughts for Today and Tomorrow (1979, collection of lectures given in 1959)
  - Full text available.
- Money, Method, and the Market Process (1990) (collection of essays)
  - Full text available.
- Economic Freedom and Interventionism (1990) (collection of essays and addresses)
  - Full text available.
- The Free Market and Its Enemies (2004, collection of lectures given in 1951)
  - Full text available.
- Marxism Unmasked: From Delusion to Destruction (2006, collection of lectures given in 1952)
  - Full text available.
- Ludwig von Mises on Money and Inflation (2010, collection of lectures given in the 1960s)
  - Full text available.

== See also ==
- Contributions to liberal theory
- Liberalism in Austria
- List of Austrian-school economists
- Mises Institute – Alabama-based think tank
- Thymology
