= Methodological individualism =

Method of analysis in social sciences

In the social sciences, methodological individualism is a method for explaining social phenomena strictly in terms of the decisions of individuals, each being moved by their own personal motivations. In contrast, explanations of social phenomena which assume that cause and effect acts upon whole classes or groups are deemed illusory, and thus rejected according to this approach. Or to put it another way, only group dynamics which can be explained in terms of individual subjective motivations are considered valid. With its bottom-up micro-level approach, methodological individualism is often contrasted with methodological holism, a top-down macro-level approach, and methodological pluralism.

== History within the social sciences ==
This framework was introduced as a foundational assumption within the social sciences by Max Weber, and discussed in his book Economy and Society. Within later schools of economic thought, such as the Austrian School, strict adherence to methodological individualism is considered a necessary starting principle. It draws heavily upon assumptions of neoclassical economics, where social behavior is explained in terms of rational actors whose choices are constrained by prices and incomes, and where individuals' subjective preferences are treated as a given.

== Criticisms ==
Economist Mark Blaug has criticized over-reliance on methodological individualism in economics, saying that "it is helpful to note what methodological individualism strictly interpreted [...] would imply for economics. In effect, it would rule out all macroeconomic propositions that cannot be reduced to microeconomic ones [...] this amounts to saying goodbye to almost the whole of received macroeconomics. There must be something wrong with a methodological principle that has such devastating implications".

Similarly, the economist Alan Kirman has critiqued general equilibrium theory and modern economics for its "fundamentally individualistic approach to constructing economic models", and showed that an individualist competitive equilibrium is not necessarily stable or unique. However, stability and uniqueness can be achieved if aggregate variables are added, and as a result he argued "the idea that we should start at the level of the isolated individual is one which we may well have to abandon".

== See also ==
- Individualism
- Methodological holism
- Methodological pluralism
- Austrian School
- Praxeology
- Analytical Marxism – School of Marxist theory
