= Praxeology =

Theory of human action

In philosophy, praxeology (Note: Also spelled praxiology.) (/ˌpræksiˈɒlədʒi/; from Ancient Greek πρᾶξις (praxis) 'deed, action' and -λογία (-logia) 'study of') is the theory of human action, based on the notion that humans engage in purposeful behavior, contrary to reflexive behavior and other unintentional behavior (reaction, contra action).

French social philosopher Alfred Espinas gave the term its modern meaning, and praxeology was developed independently by two principal groups: the Austrian school, led by Ludwig von Mises, and the Polish school, led by Tadeusz Kotarbiński.

== Origin and etymology ==
Coinage of the word praxeology (praxéologie) is often credited to Louis Bourdeau, the French author of a classification of the sciences, which he published in his Théorie des sciences. Plan de science intégrale in 1882:

On account of their dual natures of specialty and generality, these functions should be the subject of a separate science. Some of its parts have been studied for a long time, because this kind of research, in which man could be the main subject, has always presented the greatest interest. Physiology, hygiene, medicine, psychology, animal history, human history, political economy, morality, etc. represent fragments of a science that we would like to establish, but as fragments scattered and uncoordinated have remained until now only parts of particular sciences. They should be joined together and made whole in order to highlight the order of the whole and its unity. Now you have a science, so far unnamed, which we propose to call Praxeology (from πραξις, action), or by referring to the influence of the environment, Mesology (from μεσος, environment).

However, the term was used at least once previously (with a slight spelling difference), in 1608, by Clemens Timpler in his Philosophiae practicae systema methodicum:

There was Aretology: Following that Praxiology: which is the second part of the Ethics, in general, commenting on the actions of the moral virtues.

It was later mentioned by Robert Flint in 1904 in a review of Bourdeau's Théorie des sciences.

Ludwig von Mises was influenced by several theories in forming his work on praxeology, including Immanuel Kant's works, Max Weber's work on methodological individualism, and Carl Menger's development of the subjective theory of value.

Philosopher of science Mario Bunge published works of systematic philosophy that included contributions to praxeology.

== Austrian economics ==
Austrian economics in the tradition of Ludwig von Mises relies heavily on praxeology in the development of its economic theories. Mises considered economics to be a sub-discipline of praxeology. Austrian School economists, following Mises, use praxeology and deduction, rather than empirical studies, to determine economic principles. According to these theorists, with the action axiom as the starting point, it is possible to draw conclusions about human behavior that are both objective and universal. For example, the notion that humans engage in acts of choice implies that they have preferences, and this must be true for anyone who exhibits intentional behavior.

Advocates of praxeology also say that it provides insights into the field of ethics.

=== Subdivisions ===
In 1951, Murray Rothbard divided the subfields of praxeology as follows:

A. The Theory of the Isolated Individual (Crusoe Economics)
B. The Theory of Voluntary Interpersonal Exchange (Catallactics, or the Economics of the Market)

1. Barter
2. With Medium of Exchange

a. On the Unhampered Market
b. Effects of Violent Intervention with the Market
c. Effects of Violent Abolition of the Market (Socialism)

C. The Theory of War – Hostile Action
D. The Theory of Games (Game theory) (e.g., von Neumann and Morgenstern)
E. Unknown

At the time, topics C, D, and E were regarded by Rothbard as open research problems.

T.L. Hulsey proposes a fifth category of Austrian praxeology, called architectonics, which applies the subjective theory of value to politics. Architectonics states that while it is axiomatically true that any government must enforce some set of values, it is false that such values are universally valid: Government can only aspire to a local, communitarian validity, in a small polity whose values are enforced by custom, not by constitutionally-based positive law. Customary law adapts to change as local customs change, while positive law must overrule constituent polities with claims of universal validity for its monopoly of force over its entire administrative extent. The result is that government becomes a perpetual violent contest, as each region strives to gain the levers of power to preserve its values. Even the most universally agreed basic functions of a government – its courts, its police, its army – enter violent contention as each faction comes to power, using the courts for lawfare, the police for selective enforcement against opponents, and the army for foreign adventurism against supposed enemies abroad or for intimidation of secessionist polities within.

=== Criticisms ===
Thomas Mayer has argued that, because praxeology rejects positivism and empiricism in the development of theories, it constitutes nothing less than a rejection of the scientific method. For Mayer, this invalidates the methodologies of the Austrian school of economics. Austrians argue that empirical data itself is insufficient to describe economics; that consequently empirical data cannot falsify economic theory; that positivism cannot predict or explain human action; and that the methodological requirements of positivism are impossible to obtain for economic questions. Ludwig von Mises in particular argued against empiricist approaches to the social sciences in general, because human events are unique and non-repeatable, whereas experiments in the physical sciences are necessarily reproducible.

However, economist Antony Davies argues that because statistical tests are predicated on the independent development of theory, some form of praxeology is essential for model selection; conversely, praxeology can illustrate surprising philosophical consequences of economic models.

Argentine-Canadian philosopher Mario Bunge dismissed von Mises's version of praxeology as "nothing but the principle of maximization of subjective utility—a fancy version of egoism". Bunge, who was also a fierce critic of pseudoscience, warned that when "conceived in extremely general terms and detached from both ethics and science, praxiology has hardly any practical value".

== See also ==
- Action theory (philosophy)
- Action theory (sociology)
- Axiology
- Behavioral economics
- Behavioral ethics
- Decision theory
- Epistemology
- Methodological individualism
- Philosophy of economics
- Philosophy of social science
- Rationalism
- Thymology
